= Princeton Township, New Jersey =

Populated place in Mercer County, New Jersey, US

- Township
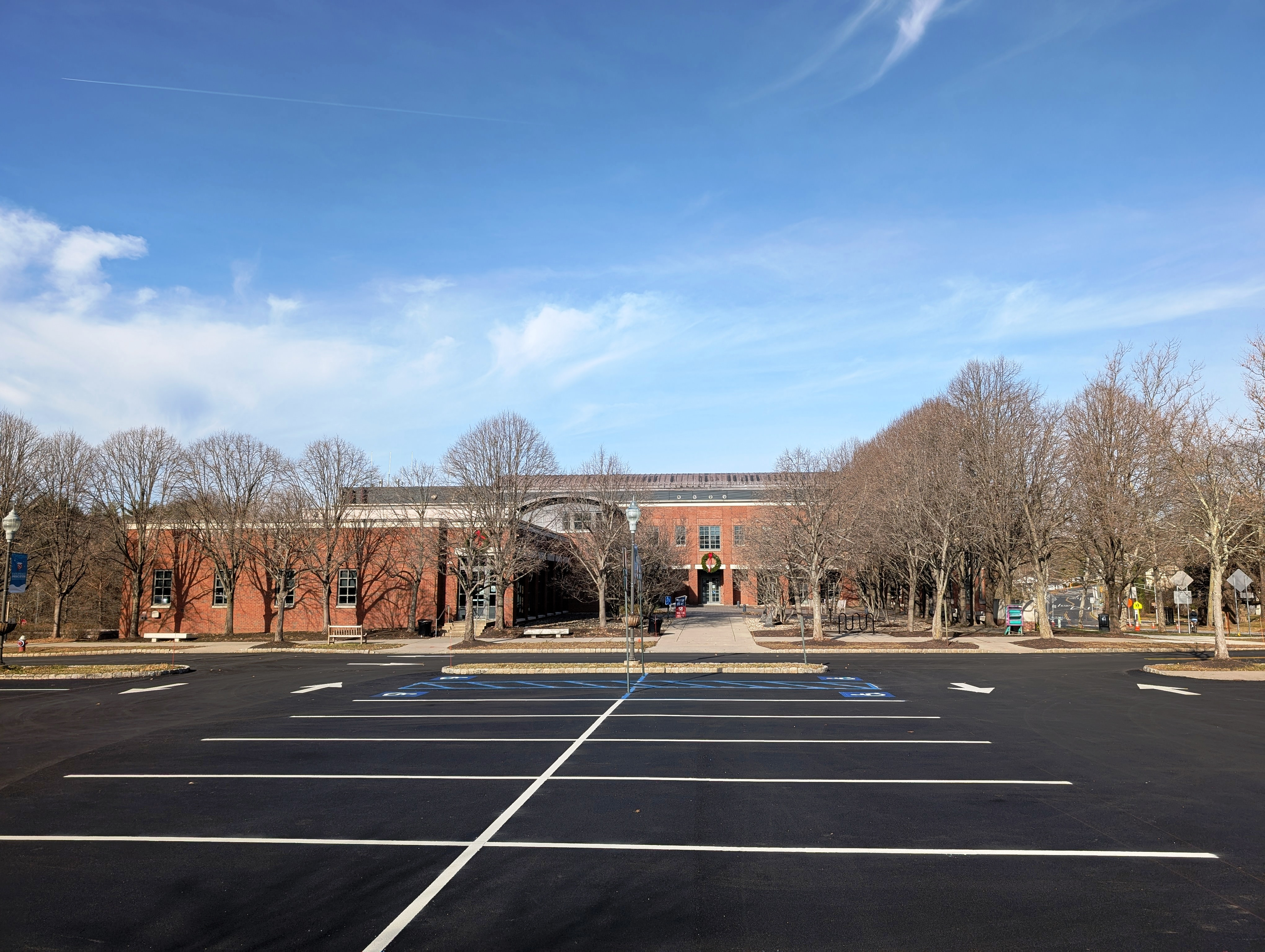
- Princeton Township Municipal Building, now the municipal building for the consolidated municipality

- Location of Princeton Township and Borough in Mercer County highlighted in red (right). Inset map: Location of Mercer County in New Jersey highlighted in orange (left).

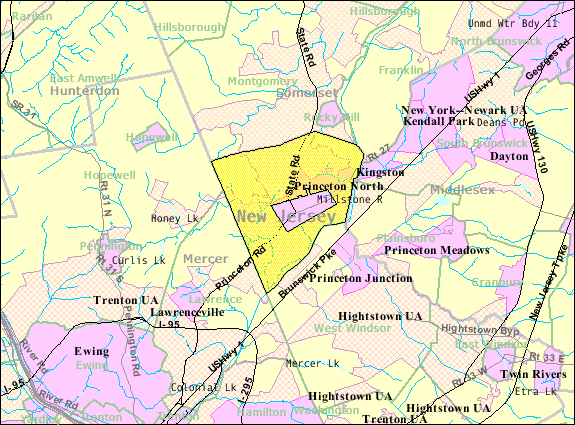
- Census Bureau map of Princeton Township, New Jersey
- Coordinates: 40.357115°N 74.670165°W
- Country: United States
- State: New Jersey
- County: Mercer
- Settled: 1683
- Incorporated: April 9, 1838
- Disestablished: January 1, 2013

Government
  - Type: Township
  - Body: Township Committee
  - Mayor: Chad Goerner (D, term ended December 31, 2012)
  - Administrator: Kathryn Monzo (acting)
  - Clerk: Linda McDermott

Area
  - Total: 16.520 sq mi (42.786 km^{2})
  - Land: 16.090 sq mi (41.672 km^{2})
  - Water: 0.430 sq mi (1.114 km^{2}) 2.60%
  - Rank: 167th of 566 in state 6th of 13 in county
- Elevation: 200 ft (61 m)

Population (2010 census)
  - Total: 16,265
  - Rank: 154th of 566 in state 8th of 13 in county
  - Density: 1,010.9/sq mi (390.3/km^{2})
  - Rank: 379th of 566 in state 11th of 13 in county
- Time zone: UTC−05:00 (Eastern (EST))
  - Summer (DST): UTC−04:00 (Eastern (EDT))
- ZIP Codes: 08540-08544
- Area code: 609
- FIPS code: 3402160915
- GNIS feature ID: 0882125
- Website: www.princetontownship.org

Princeton Township was a township in Mercer County, in the U.S. state of New Jersey, that existed from 1838 until the end of 2012. On January 1, 2013, it merged with the Borough of Princeton to form Princeton, New Jersey; both Princeton Township and the Borough of Princeton were dissolved in the merger.

As of the 2010 United States census, the township's population was 16,265, reflecting an increase of 238 (+1.5%) from the 16,027 counted in the 2000 census, which had in turn increased by 2,829 (+21.4%) from the 13,198 counted in the 1990 census.

Princeton was incorporated as a township by an act of the New Jersey Legislature on April 9, 1838, from portions of West Windsor Township in Mercer County and Montgomery Township in Somerset County. The Borough of Princeton — created on February 11, 1813 within the area that later became Princeton Township — became a fully independent municipality circa 1894. Portions of territory were ceded to the Borough of Princeton on January 4, 1928 and August 21, 1951. On November 8, 2011, voters in Princeton Township voted to consolidate with Princeton Borough, a change that took effect on January 1, 2013.

The Institute for Advanced Study, a private research institution that has been an academic home to Albert Einstein, Kurt Gödel, and many other famous and prize-winning scientists, is located in the former township. Princeton University is located mostly within the former borough, but parts of the campus extended into what was Princeton Township.

Drumthwacket, the official residence of the governor of New Jersey, is located at 344 Stockton Street in the area of the former township.

The last day Princeton Township existed as an independent municipality was December 31, 2012.

== Geography ==
According to the United States Census Bureau, the township had a total area of 16.520 square miles (42.786 km^{2}), including 16.090 square miles (41.672 km^{2}) of it is land and 0.430 square miles (1.114 km^{2}) of water (2.60%) is water.

Princeton Borough was an independent municipality completely surrounded by the township.

Princeton North was an unincorporated community located within Princeton Township that had been a census-designated place until the 2010 census.

The Princeton Airport is within Princeton's postal district but is situated less than a mile across the Somerset County border, in Montgomery Township.

== Demographics ==
Historical population
Census	Pop.	Note	%±
1870	1,188		—
1880	1,139		−4.1%
1890	809		−29.0%
1900	955		18.0%
1910	1,178		23.4%
1920	1,424		20.9%
1930	2,738		92.3%
1940	3,251		18.7%
1950	5,407		66.3%
1960	10,411		92.5%
1970	13,651		31.1%
1980	13,683		0.2%
1990	13,198		−3.5%
2000	16,027		21.4%
2010	16,265		1.5%
2011 (est.)	16,304		0.2%
Population sources: 1870 1880-1890; 1890-1910 1910-1930; 1930-1990 2000 2010

=== 2010 census ===
The 2010 United States census counted 16,265 people, 6,360 households, and 4,325 families in the township. The population density was 1,010.9 per square mile (390.3/km^{2}). There were 6,814 housing units at an average density of 423.5 per square mile (163.5/km^{2}). The racial makeup was 75.52% (12,283) White, 4.98% (810) Black or African American, 0.14% (22) Native American, 14.17% (2,305) Asian, 0.02% (4) Pacific Islander, 2.26% (368) from other races, and 2.91% (473) from two or more races. Hispanic or Latino of any race were 6.91% (1,124) of the population.

Of the 6,360 households, 31.4% had children under the age of 18; 59.1% were married couples living together; 7.0% had a female householder with no husband present and 32.0% were non-families. Of all households, 23.6% were made up of individuals and 8.8% had someone living alone who was 65 years of age or older. The average household size was 2.52 and the average family size was 3.02.

23.1% of the population were under the age of 18, 6.5% from 18 to 24, 23.7% from 25 to 44, 29.7% from 45 to 64, and 17.0% who were 65 years of age or older. The median age was 42.6 years. For every 100 females, the population had 94.0 males. For every 100 females ages 18 and older there were 90.8 males.

The Census Bureau's 2006-2010 American Community Survey showed that (in 2010 inflation-adjusted dollars) median household income was $107,071 (with a margin of error of +/- $12,828) and the median family income was $149,948 (+/- $16,625). Males had a median income of $112,282 (+/- $7,079) versus $66,150 (+/- $11,617) for females. The per capita income for the borough was $71,050 (+/- $6,509). About 6.2% of families and 7.7% of the population were below the poverty line, including 6.1% of those under age 18 and 6.2% of those age 65 or over.

=== 2000 census ===
As of the 2000 United States census there were 16,027 people, 6,044 households, and 4,357 families residing in the township. The population density was 978.2 inhabitants per square mile (377.7/km^{2}). There were 6,224 housing units at an average density of 379.9 per square mile (146.7/km^{2}). The racial makeup of the township was 79.91% White, 5.32% African American, 0.12% Native American, 9.98% Asian, 0.05% Pacific Islander, 2.11% from other races, and 2.51% from two or more races. Hispanic or Latino of any race were 5.28% of the population.

There were 6,044 households, out of which 34.1% had children under the age of 18 living with them, 63.3% were married couples living together, 7.2% had a female householder with no husband present, and 27.9% were non-families. 20.6% of all households were made up of individuals, and 8.2% had someone living alone who was 65 years of age or older. The average household size was 2.57 and the average family size was 2.98.

In the township the population was spread out, with 24.4% under the age of 18, 5.1% from 18 to 24, 27.4% from 25 to 44, 27.7% from 45 to 64, and 15.4% who were 65 years of age or older. The median age was 41 years. For every 100 females, there were 93.6 males. For every 100 females age 18 and over, there were 90.6 males.

The median income for a household in the township was $94,580, and the median income for a family was $123,098. Males had a median income of $77,845 versus $41,563 for females. The per capita income for the township was $56,360. About 4.2% of families and 5.7% of the population were below the poverty line, including 5.7% of those under age 18 and 3.0% of those age 65 or over.

As of the 2000 census, Princeton Township was the 25th-wealthiest community in the state of New Jersey with a per capita money income of $56,360 as of 1999, an increase of 41.7% from the $39,767 recorded in 1989 when it was ranked 21st in the state.

== Climate ==
According to the Köppen climate classification system, Princeton Township has a Hot-summer Humid continental climate (Dfa).

Climate data for Princeton Twp (40.3575, -74.6673), Elevation 128 ft (39 m), 1991–2020 normals, extremes 1981–2022
Month	Jan	Feb	Mar	Apr	May	Jun	Jul	Aug	Sep	Oct	Nov	Dec	Year
Record high °F (°C)	71.1 (21.7)	77.6 (25.3)	87.5 (30.8)	94.5 (34.7)	95.1 (35.1)	96.8 (36.0)	102.2 (39.0)	99.9 (37.7)	97.1 (36.2)	92.9 (33.8)	80.1 (26.7)	75.1 (23.9)	102.2 (39.0)
Mean daily maximum °F (°C)	39.8 (4.3)	42.3 (5.7)	50.3 (10.2)	62.6 (17.0)	72.3 (22.4)	81.4 (27.4)	86.1 (30.1)	84.3 (29.1)	77.8 (25.4)	65.8 (18.8)	55.0 (12.8)	44.8 (7.1)	63.6 (17.6)
Mean daily minimum °F (°C)	22.7 (−5.2)	24.1 (−4.4)	31.1 (−0.5)	41.0 (5.0)	50.7 (10.4)	59.9 (15.5)	65.1 (18.4)	63.4 (17.4)	56.2 (13.4)	44.6 (7.0)	34.9 (1.6)	27.9 (−2.3)	43.6 (6.4)
Record low °F (°C)	−12.1 (−24.5)	−3.4 (−19.7)	2.7 (−16.3)	17.4 (−8.1)	31.5 (−0.3)	40.4 (4.7)	46.6 (8.1)	40.9 (4.9)	34.9 (1.6)	23.9 (−4.5)	9.4 (−12.6)	−0.3 (−17.9)	−12.1 (−24.5)
Average precipitation inches (mm)	3.59 (91)	2.82 (72)	4.26 (108)	3.77 (96)	4.09 (104)	4.58 (116)	5.00 (127)	4.48 (114)	4.24 (108)	4.17 (106)	3.37 (86)	4.41 (112)	48.79 (1,239)
Average snowfall inches (cm)	8.2 (21)	8.7 (22)	4.2 (11)	0.2 (0.51)	0.0 (0.0)	0.0 (0.0)	0.0 (0.0)	0.0 (0.0)	0.0 (0.0)	0.2 (0.51)	0.7 (1.8)	3.7 (9.4)	26.0 (66)
Average dew point °F (°C)	21.2 (−6.0)	21.8 (−5.7)	27.2 (−2.7)	36.8 (2.7)	48.8 (9.3)	59.2 (15.1)	64.1 (17.8)	63.4 (17.4)	57.3 (14.1)	45.8 (7.7)	34.5 (1.4)	26.9 (−2.8)	42.4 (5.8)
Source 1: PRISM
Source 2: NOHRSC (Snow, 2008/2009 - 2022/2023 normals)

== Ecology ==
According to the A. W. Kuchler U.S. potential natural vegetation types, Princetown Township would have a dominant vegetation type of Appalachian Oak (104) with a dominant vegetation form of Eastern Hardwood Forest (25).

== Government ==
=== Local government ===
Princeton Township was governed under the Township form of government with a five-member Township Committee. The Township Committee was elected directly by the voters in partisan elections to serve three-year terms of office on a staggered basis, with one seat coming up for election each year. A Mayor and Deputy Member were elected by the Committee from among its members and serve a one-year term. The Mayor served as the Chairperson of the Committee and exercised executive powers vested in the Mayor's Office by law. All legislative powers were assigned to the Committee. 104 of the 565 municipalities in New Jersey operate with a five-member Committee form of local government.

An Administrator was also empowered by ordinance to serve in an executive capacity and direct the Township's day-to-day operations.

Members of the final Princeton Township Committee were Mayor Chad Goerner (D, term ended December 31, 2012), Deputy Mayor Liz Lempert (D, 2013), Lance Liverman (D, 2013), Bernard P. Miller (D, 2014) and Sue Nemeth (D, 2014).

=== Merger of Borough and Township ===
On November 8, 2011, the residents of both the Borough of Princeton and the Township of Princeton voted to merge the two municipalities into one. In Princeton Borough 1,385 voted for, 902 voted against while in Princeton Township 3,542 voted for and 604 voted against. Proponents of the consolidation measure asserted that when the merger is completed, the new municipality of Princeton will save $3.2 million as a result of some scaled-down services, including layoffs of 15 government workers, including 9 police officers (however, the measure itself does not create any line item cost reduction or layoffs). Opponents to the consolidation measure asserted that cost savings alleged by a widely circulated report were incorrect and/or unsubstantiated and that individual voter representation would be diluted by the merged municipal structure. The consolidation is to take effect in 2013.

=== Federal, state and county representation ===
Princeton Township was located in the 12th Congressional district and was part of New Jersey's 16th state legislative district. Prior to the 2011 reapportionment following the 2010 census, Princeton Township had been in the 15th state legislative district.

=== Politics ===
As of March 23, 2011, there were a total of 11,488 registered voters in Princeton Township, of which 5,691 (49.5%) were registered as Democrats, 1,520 (13.2%) were registered as Republicans and 4,263 (37.1%) were registered as Unaffiliated. There were 14 voters registered to other parties.

In the 2008 presidential election, Democrat Barack Obama received 75.3% of the vote here (6,963 cast), ahead of Republican John McCain with 20.7% (1,914 votes) and other candidates with 1.1% (103 votes), among the 9,247 ballots cast by the township's 12,423 registered voters, for a turnout of 74.4%. In the 2004 presidential election, Democrat John Kerry received 70.6% of the vote here (6,276 ballots cast), outpolling Republican George W. Bush with 25.8% (2,295 votes) and other candidates with 1.0% (111 votes), among the 8,894 ballots cast by the township's 11,190 registered voters, for a turnout percentage of 79.5.

In the 2009 gubernatorial election, Democrat Jon Corzine received 66.1% of the vote here (3,867 ballots cast), ahead of Republican Chris Christie with 26.9% (1,576 votes), Independent Chris Daggett with 5.8% (342 votes) and other candidates with 0.5% (29 votes), among the 5,854 ballots cast by the township's 11,777 registered voters, yielding a 49.7% turnout.

== Education ==
=== Colleges and universities ===
Part of Princeton University, including most of the athletic facilities, was in the township. Most university buildings were in the borough. The rest of the university's land is across Carnegie Lake in West Windsor Township.

The Princeton Theological Seminary and the Institute for Advanced Study were in the township.

Westminster Choir College was located mainly in the borough; a small part was in the township.

Mercer County Community College served residents of the township.

=== Primary and secondary schools ===
==== Public schools ====
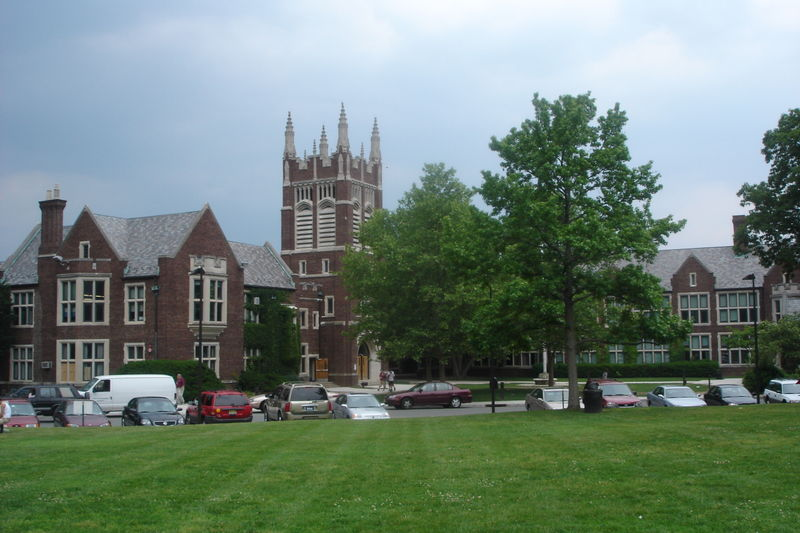
Princeton High School

For grades K through 12, public school students attended the Princeton Regional Schools, a regional school district shared with Princeton Borough that also serves students from Cranbury Township, as part of a sending/receiving relationship. Schools in the district (with 2010-11 enrollment data from the National Center for Education Statistics) are Community Park Elementary School (grades K-5, 321 students; located in Princeton Township), Johnson Park Elementary School (K-5, 372; Princeton Township), Littlebrook Elementary School (K-5, 335; Princeton Township), Riverside Elementary School (K-5, 276; Princeton Township), John Witherspoon Middle School (6-8, 664; Princeton Township) and Princeton High School (9-12, 1,420; Borough of Princeton).

The Princeton Charter School, located in the township, opened in September 1997 and serves students from the borough and township who are selected by lottery from among applicants.

==== Private schools ====
Several private schools are located in the Township, including the American Boychoir School, Hun School of Princeton, Princeton Academy of the Sacred Heart, Princeton Day School, Princeton Friends School, and Stuart Country Day School.

=== Public libraries ===
The Princeton Public Library, located in the borough, serves the borough and the township. The library was entirely rebuilt in 2004 at its downtown location at the corner of Witherspoon Street and Wiggins Street and opened its doors in April of that year.

== Points of interest ==
- The site of the Mercer Oak, against which the dying General Hugh Mercer rested while his men around him continued to fight the Battle of Princeton in 1777. The oak is the emblem of Princeton Township and appears on the seal of Mercer County. The tree died in 2000, and one of its saplings now grows in its place.
- The Washington Oak - 275+ year-old white oak overlooking Princeton Battlefield State Park on the spot where British and American forces first saw each other.
- Delaware and Raritan Canal - runs along the Stony Brook and the eastern bank of Carnegie Lake.
- Stony Brook Meeting House and Cemetery - historic sites of 18th century meeting house and burial site of Richard Stockton (signer of the Declaration of Independence) and Governor of New Jersey Charles Smith Olden.
- Drumthwacket - official residence of the governor of New Jersey

== Sister cities ==
- Comune di Pettoranello del Molise, Molise, Italy.
- Colmar, Alsace France

== See also ==
- Town Topics
