= Princeton Public Library =

Library in Princeton, New Jersey, US

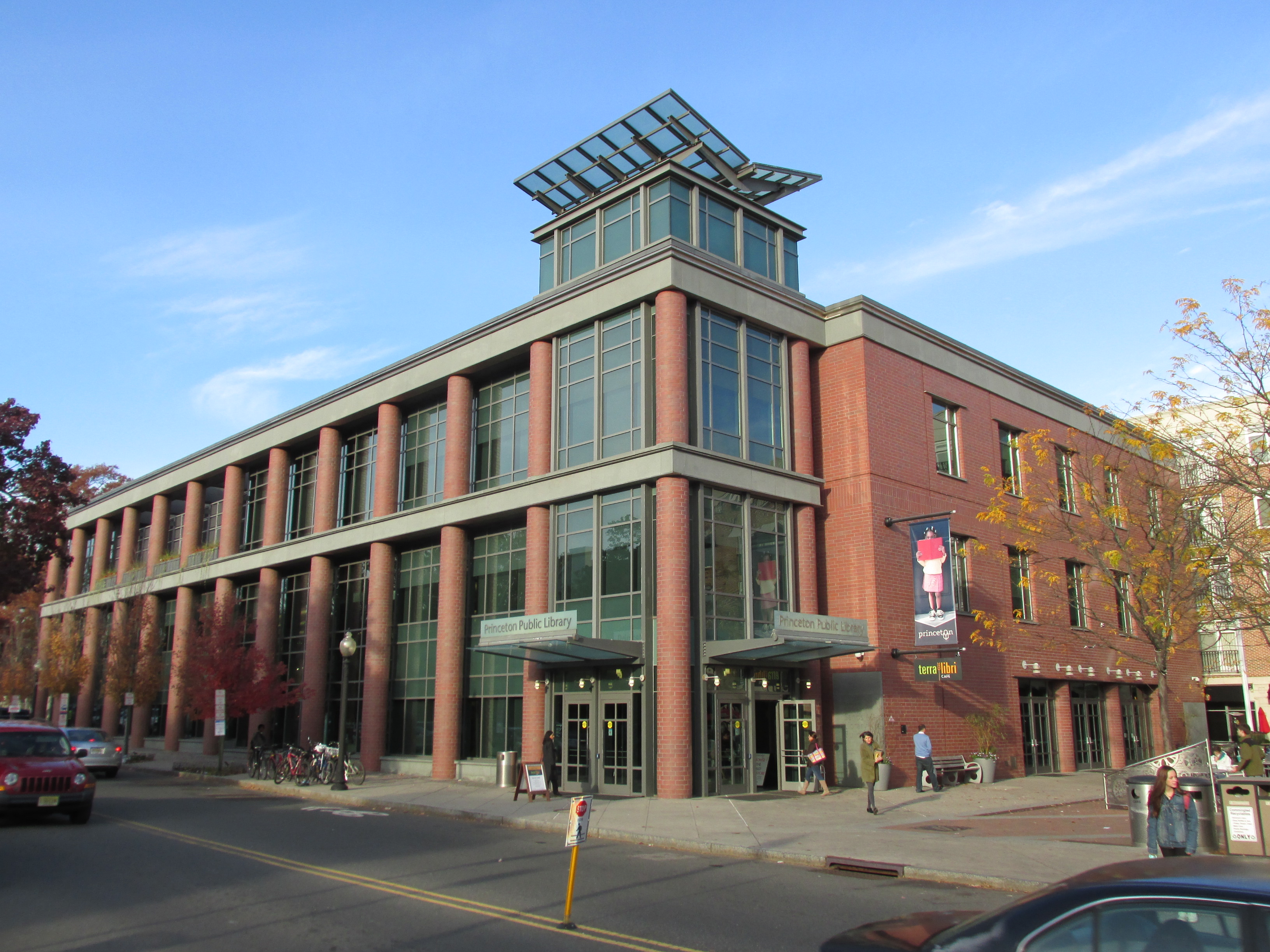
- 40.351727°N 74.660327°W
- Location: 65 Witherspoon Street, Princeton, New Jersey, United States
- Type: Public library
- Established: 1909

Collection
- Size: 204,144 (2013)

Access and use
- Access requirements: Residence in Princeton, New Jersey or affiliation with Princeton University
- Circulation: 555,959 (2013)
- Population served: 28,572 (2012)
- Members: 30,838 (2012)

Other information
- Budget: $4,948,790 (2012)
- Director: Jennifer Podolsky
- Employees: 57.3 (FTE) (2013)
- Website: princetonlibrary.org

The Princeton Public Library serves the town of Princeton, New Jersey. It is the most visited municipal public library in New Jersey with over 860,000 annual visitors who borrow 550,000 items, ask more than 83,000 reference questions, log onto library computers over 90,000 times, and attend more than 1,300 programs. Its usage exceeds all but five of New Jersey's twenty-one county systems. Compared to New Jersey's largest municipal library, Newark, Princeton spends four times as much per capita, and has nearly double the number of visitors and circulation in absolute terms despite a tenth the population.

== History ==
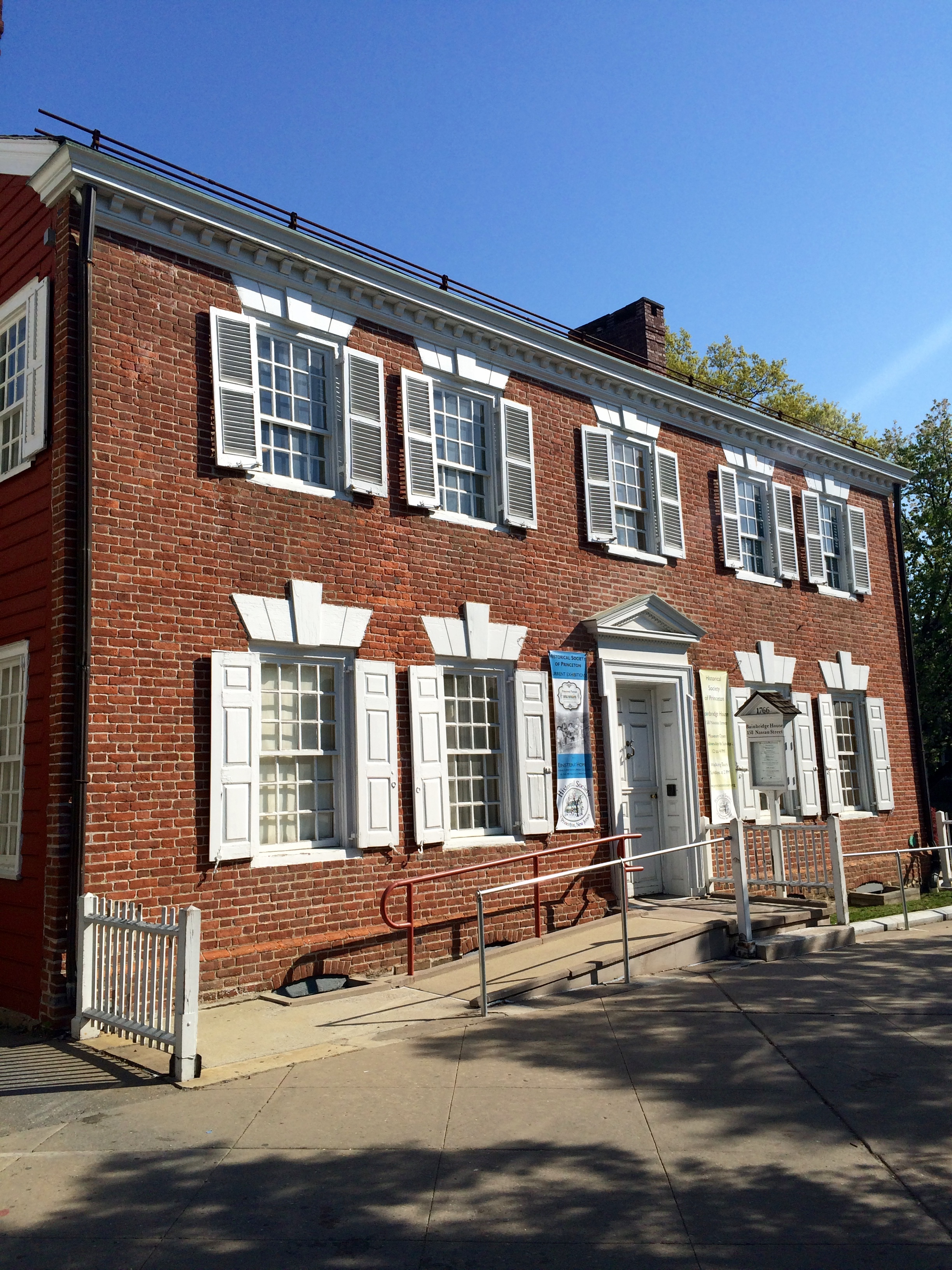
Bainbridge House, the location of the library from 1909 through 1966

=== Bainbridge House ===
The town of Princeton's first purpose built libraries, among the first in the country, were those of the Princeton Theological Seminary, Lenox Library (1843), and Princeton University, Chancellor Green Library (1873). The town itself however would not have a library to call its own until the twentieth century.

The Princeton Public Library opened in 1909, and has had three different homes. The library was originally located at the historic Bainbridge House on Nassau Street, which is the current home of the Princeton Historical Society. Bainbridge house had been built in 1766 by Job Stockton and was the birthplace of naval hero William Bainbridge. The house came into the ownership of Princeton University, which rented it to the library for $1 a year.

=== Witherspoon Street ===
The growing library moved in 1966 to a building at 65 Witherspoon Street. By 2002 the library had a collection of 130,000 books in a building designed for 80,000 and the decision was made to build a new home for the library on the same site. The library was then moved to a temporary location at 301 North Harrison Street during the construction of the new 58,000-square-foot (5,400 m^{2}), state-of-the-art library which was opened at 65 Witherspoon Street in April 2004. The new building and the library's new logos and signage were designed by Hillier Architecture. The building is named for George and Estelle Sands, who made a $5 million donation, with half going to provide an endowment. The J. Seward Johnson Charitable Trust donated $1 million and the university $400,000. The total cost of the new building was $18 million with two-thirds of that raised from private donations, $4 million from Princeton Township, and $2 million from Princeton Borough.
