= Borough of Princeton, New Jersey =

Populated place in Mercer County, New Jersey, US

- Borough
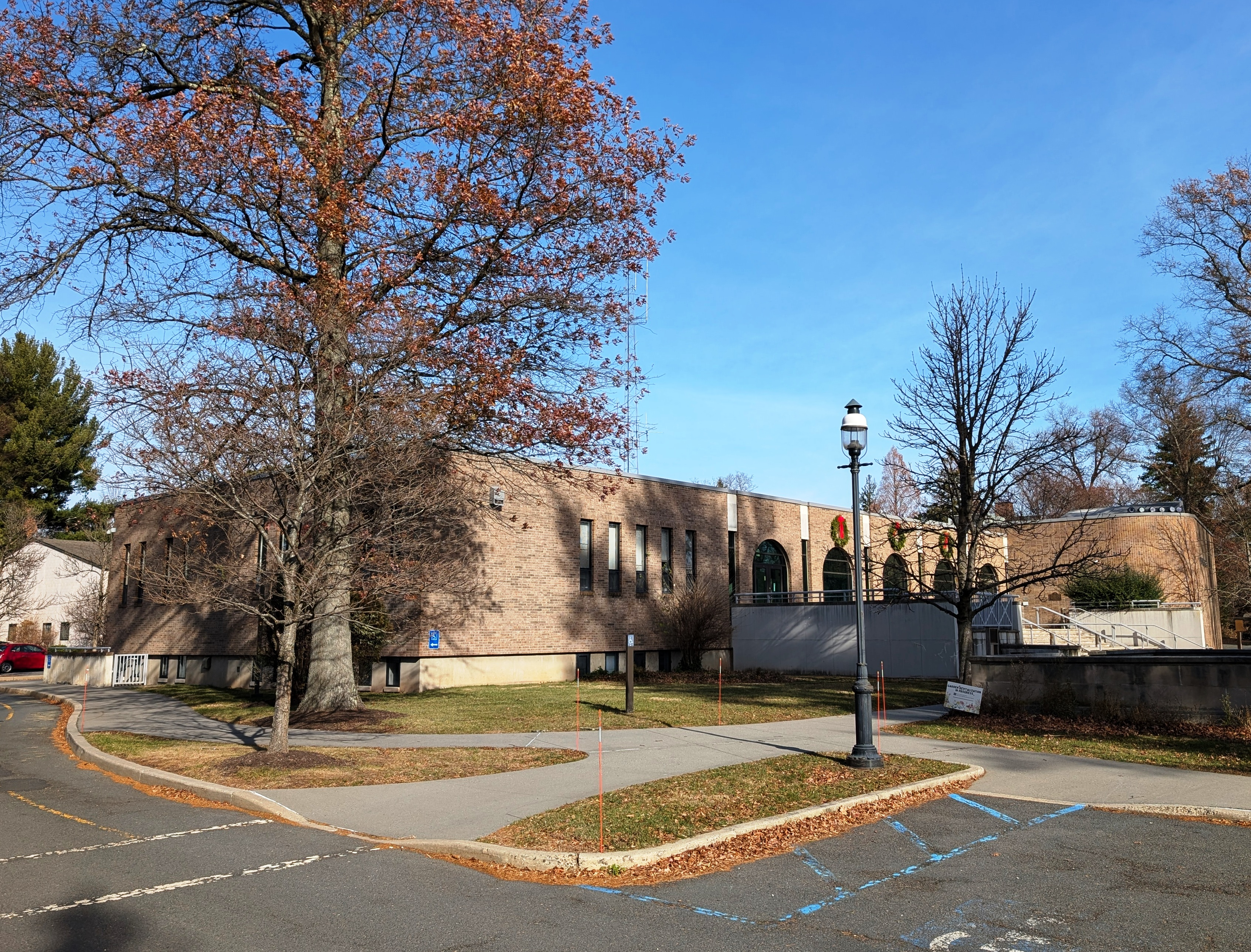
- Monument Hall, the borough hall for the previous incarnation of Princeton Borough

- Location of Princeton Township and Borough in Mercer County highlighted in red (right). Inset map: Location of Mercer County in New Jersey highlighted in orange (left).

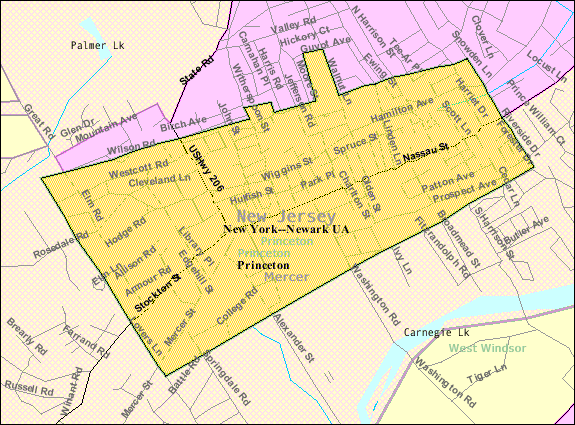
- Census Bureau map of Borough of Princeton, New Jersey
- Coordinates: 40.350461°N 74.659371°W
- Country: United States
- State: New Jersey
- County: Mercer
- Incorporated: February 11, 1813
- Disestablished: January 1, 2013

Government
  - Type: Borough
  - Body: Borough Council
  - Mayor: Yina Moore (D, term ended December 31, 2012)
  - Administrator: Robert W. Bruschi
  - Clerk: Robert W. Bruschi (acting)

Area
  - Total: 1.843 sq mi (4.774 km^{2})
  - Land: 1.842 sq mi (4.772 km^{2})
  - Water: 0.00039 sq mi (0.001 km^{2}) 0.03%
  - Rank: 423rd of 566 in state 10th of 13 in county
- Elevation: 190 ft (58 m)

Population (2010 Census)
  - Total: 12,307
  - Rank: 198th of 566 in state 10th of 13 in county
  - Density: 6,679.2/sq mi (2,578.9/km^{2})
  - Rank: 70th of 566 in state 2nd of 13 in county
- Time zone: UTC-5 (Eastern (EST))
  - Summer (DST): UTC-4 (Eastern (EDT))
- ZIP code: 08540, 08542
- Area codes: 609 and 640
- FIPS code: 3402160900
- GNIS feature ID: 0885361
- Website: princetonboro.org

The Borough of Princeton was a borough of New Jersey that existed from 1813 until the end of 2012. On January 1, 2013, it merged with Princeton Township to form Princeton, New Jersey; both the Borough of Princeton and Princeton Township were dissolved in the merger.

The borough was located in Mercer County, in the U.S. state of New Jersey, and was completely surrounded by the former Princeton Township, from which it was formed in 1894. As of the 2010 United States census, the borough had a population of 12,307, reflecting a decline of 1,896 (-13.3%) from the 14,203 counted in the 2000 Census, which had in turn increased by 2,187 (+18.2%) from the 12,016 counted in the 1990 Census.

The Borough of Princeton was incorporated by an act of the New Jersey Legislature on February 11, 1813, within portions of West Windsor Township (in what was then part of Middlesex County) and Montgomery Township (in Somerset County), and was reincorporated on November 27, 1822. The borough became part of the newly created Mercer County in 1838, and became a fully independent municipality circa 1894. Portions of territory were acquired from Princeton Township on January 4, 1928, and August 21, 1951. On November 8, 2011, voters in Princeton Borough voted to consolidate with Princeton Township.

Morven, the former residence of the Governor of New Jersey, is at 55 Stockton Street in the former borough, while the current residence is Drumthwacket in the former township.

== Geography ==
Princeton borough was located at 40°21′02″N 74°39′34″W (40.350461,-74.659371). According to the U.S. Census Bureau, the borough had a total area of 1.843 square miles (4.774 km^{2}), all of which was land.

== Demographics ==
Historical population
Census	Pop.	Note	%±
1870	2,798		—
1880	3,209		14.7%
1890	3,422		6.6%
1900	3,899		13.9%
1910	5,136		31.7%
1920	5,917		15.2%
1930	6,992		18.2%
1940	7,719		10.4%
1950	12,230		58.4%
1960	11,890		−2.8%
1970	12,311		3.5%
1980	12,035		−2.2%
1990	12,016		−0.2%
2000	14,203		18.2%
2010	12,307		−13.3%
2011 (est.)	12,131		−1.4%
Population sources: 1870 1880-1890; 1890-1910 1910-1930; 1930-1990 2000 2010

=== Census 2010 ===
The 2010 United States census counted 12,307 people, 3,161 households, and 1,644 families in the borough. The population density was 6,679.2 per square mile (2,578.9/km^{2}). There were 3,488 housing units at an average density of 1,893.0 per square mile (730.9/km^{2}). The racial makeup was 72.07% (8,870) White, 6.44% (793) Black or African American, 0.18% (22) Native American, 13.51% (1,663) Asian, 0.16% (20) Pacific Islander, 4.13% (508) from other races, and 3.50% (431) from two or more races. Hispanic or Latino of any race were 10.30% (1,268) of the population.

Of the 3,161 households, 24.2% had children under the age of 18; 42.4% were married couples living together; 6.6% had a female householder with no husband present and 48.0% were non-families. Of all households, 39.6% were made up of individuals and 14.9% had someone living alone who was 65 years of age or older. The average household size was 2.21 and the average family size was 2.96.

11.7% of the population were under the age of 18, 43.7% from 18 to 24, 19.6% from 25 to 44, 14.7% from 45 to 64, and 10.2% who were 65 years of age or older. The median age was 22.9 years. For every 100 females, the population had 104.5 males. For every 100 females ages 18 and older there were 103.6 males.

The Census Bureau's 2006-2010 American Community Survey showed that (in 2010 inflation-adjusted dollars) median household income was $104,234 (with a margin of error of +/- $20,004) and the median family income was $148,295 (+/- $34,644). Males had a median income of $96,225 (+/- $29,348) versus $82,572 (+/- $28,930) for females. The per capita income for the borough was $45,566 (+/- $5,208). About 2.5% of families and 6.5% of the population were below the poverty line, including 0.0% of those under age 18 and 8.5% of those age 65 or over.

=== Census 2000 ===
As of the 2000 United States census there were 14,203 people, 3,326 households, and 1,692 families residing in the borough. The population density was 7,686.3 inhabitants per square mile (2,967.7/km^{2}). There were 3,495 housing units at an average density of 1,891.4 per square mile (730.3/km^{2}). The racial makeup of the borough was 80.26% White, 6.39% African American, 0.28% Native American, 7.46% Asian, 0.14% Pacific Islander, 2.50% from other races, and 2.96% from two or more races. Hispanic or Latino of any race were 7.10% of the population. Most of the Hispanic population consists of Mexican and Guatemalan immigrants.

There were 3,326 households, out of which 22.3% had children under the age of 18 living with them, 42.5% were married couples living together, 6.4% had a female householder with no husband present, and 49.1% were non-families. 40.1% of all households were made up of individuals, and 12.0% had someone living alone who was 65 years of age or older. The average household size was 2.20 and the average family size was 2.92.

In the borough the population was spread out, with 10.1% under the age of 18, 40.9% from 18 to 24, 27.4% from 25 to 44, 12.3% from 45 to 64, and 9.3% who were 65 years of age or older. The median age was 25 years. For every 100 females, there were 108.2 males. For every 100 females age 18 and over, there were 107.8 males. The borough's unusually low median age and high concentration of 18- to 24-year-olds is influenced by Princeton University.

The median income for a household in the borough was $67,346, and the median income for a family was $102,957. Males had a median income of $60,341 versus $52,900 for females. The per capita income for the borough was $27,292. About 2.9% of families and 9.0% of the population were below the poverty line, including 5.4% of those under age 18 and 6.8% of those age 65 or over.

== Climate ==
According to the Köppen climate classification system, the Borough of Princeton has a Hot-summer Humid continental climate (Dfa).

Climate data for Princeton Twp (40.3512, -74.6575), Elevation 184 ft (56 m), 1991–2020 normals, extremes 1981–2022
Month	Jan	Feb	Mar	Apr	May	Jun	Jul	Aug	Sep	Oct	Nov	Dec	Year
Record high °F (°C)	71.2 (21.8)	77.7 (25.4)	87.6 (30.9)	94.8 (34.9)	95.4 (35.2)	97.2 (36.2)	102.6 (39.2)	100.4 (38.0)	97.4 (36.3)	93.4 (34.1)	80.4 (26.9)	75.2 (24.0)	102.6 (39.2)
Mean daily maximum °F (°C)	39.8 (4.3)	42.3 (5.7)	50.1 (10.1)	62.4 (16.9)	72.0 (22.2)	81.2 (27.3)	85.8 (29.9)	84.0 (28.9)	77.6 (25.3)	65.6 (18.7)	54.9 (12.7)	44.8 (7.1)	63.5 (17.5)
Mean daily minimum °F (°C)	22.7 (−5.2)	24.1 (−4.4)	31.0 (−0.6)	40.9 (4.9)	50.8 (10.4)	59.9 (15.5)	65.1 (18.4)	63.3 (17.4)	56.2 (13.4)	44.5 (6.9)	34.8 (1.6)	27.8 (−2.3)	43.5 (6.4)
Record low °F (°C)	−12.0 (−24.4)	−3.5 (−19.7)	3.4 (−15.9)	17.5 (−8.1)	31.3 (−0.4)	40.3 (4.6)	46.3 (7.9)	41.0 (5.0)	34.7 (1.5)	23.8 (−4.6)	9.4 (−12.6)	−0.3 (−17.9)	−12.0 (−24.4)
Average precipitation inches (mm)	3.58 (91)	2.82 (72)	4.26 (108)	3.77 (96)	4.09 (104)	4.57 (116)	5.00 (127)	4.47 (114)	4.23 (107)	4.16 (106)	3.36 (85)	4.41 (112)	48.72 (1,237)
Average snowfall inches (cm)	8.2 (21)	8.7 (22)	4.2 (11)	0.2 (0.51)	0.0 (0.0)	0.0 (0.0)	0.0 (0.0)	0.0 (0.0)	0.0 (0.0)	0.2 (0.51)	0.7 (1.8)	3.7 (9.4)	26.0 (66)
Average dew point °F (°C)	21.2 (−6.0)	21.7 (−5.7)	27.2 (−2.7)	36.8 (2.7)	48.9 (9.4)	59.2 (15.1)	64.0 (17.8)	63.4 (17.4)	57.4 (14.1)	45.8 (7.7)	34.4 (1.3)	26.9 (−2.8)	42.3 (5.7)
Source 1: PRISM
Source 2: NOHRSC (Snow, 2008/2009 - 2022/2023 normals)

== Ecology ==
According to the A. W. Kuchler U.S. potential natural vegetation types, the Borough of Princeton would have a dominant vegetation type of Appalachian Oak (104) with a dominant vegetation form of Eastern Hardwood Forest (25).

== Government ==
=== Local government ===
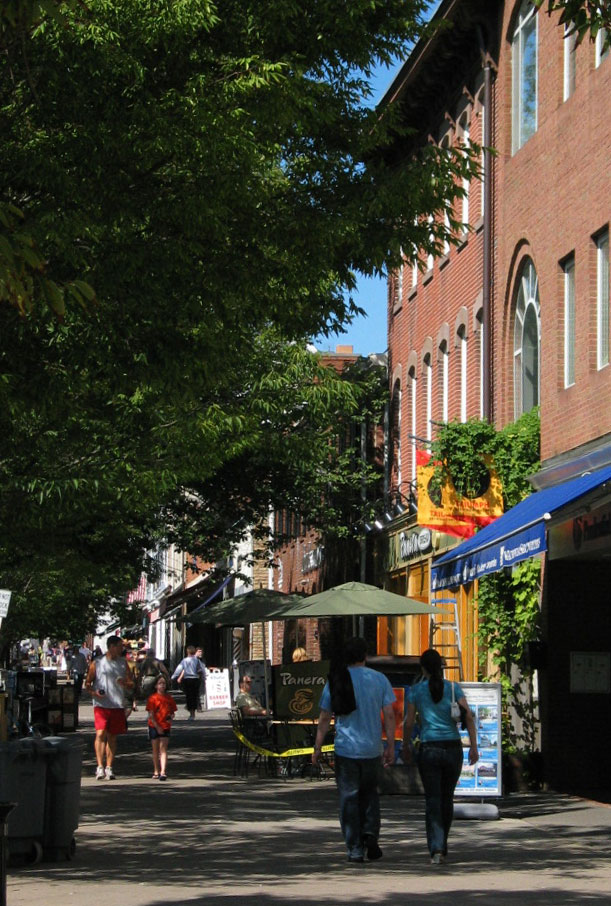
Nassau Street, the main street of the Borough of Princeton

The Borough of Princeton was governed under the borough form of New Jersey municipal government. The government consisted of a mayor and a borough council comprising six council members, with all positions elected at large. A mayor was elected directly by the voters to a four-year term of office. The borough council consisted of six members elected to serve three-year terms on a staggered basis, with two seats coming up for election each year.

The mayor served as the borough's chief executive officer and nominated appointees to various boards and commissions subject to approval of the borough council. The mayor presided at the borough council meetings and voted in the case of a tie or a few other specific cases.

The borough council had administrative powers and was the policy-making body of the borough. The council had six members; two were elected each year and they served three-year terms. The council approved appointments made by the mayor. Council Members served on various boards and committees and acted as liaison's to certain Departments, Committees or Boards. The mayor of the Borough of Princeton, New Jersey, was Yina Moore (D, term ended on December 31, 2012). Members of the borough council were Jo Butler (D, 2012), Jenny Crumiller (D, 2012), Heather Howard (D, 2012), Roger Martindell (D, 2012), Barbara Trelstad (D, 2012) and Kevin Wilkes (D, 2012).

=== Merger of borough and township ===
Additional details are at Merger of borough and township on the Princeton, New Jersey, article

On November 8, 2011, the residents of both the Borough of Princeton and the Township of Princeton voted to merge the two municipalities into one. In Princeton Borough 1,385 voted for, 902 voted against while in Princeton Township 3,542 voted for and 604 voted against. Proponents of the merger asserted that when the merger is completed the new municipality of Princeton will save $3.2 million as a result of some scaled-down services, including layoffs of 15 government workers, including 9 police officers (however, the measure itself does not mandate such layoffs). Opponents of the measure challenged the findings of the report, citing cost savings as unsubstantiated, and noted that voter representation would be reduced in a smaller government structure. The consolidation took effect on January 1, 2013. December 31, 2012 was the last day the Borough of Princeton existed as a municipality.

=== Federal, state and county representation ===
The Borough of Princeton was in the 12th Congressional district and was part of New Jersey's 16th state legislative district. Prior to the 2011 reapportionment following the 2010 Census, Princeton Boro had been in the 15th state legislative district.

=== Politics ===
As of March 23, 2011, there were a total of 6,561 registered voters in the Borough of Princeton, of which 3,493 (53.2%) were registered as Democrats, 620 (9.4%) were registered as Republicans and 2,440 (37.2%) were registered as Unaffiliated. There were 8 voters registered to other parties.

In the 2008 presidential election, Democrat Barack Obama received 80.4% of the vote here (3,880 cast), ahead of Republican John McCain with 17.0% (819 votes) and other candidates with 1.1% (51 votes), among the 4,828 ballots cast by the borough's 7,679 registered voters, for a turnout of 62.9%. In the 2004 presidential election, Democrat John Kerry received 73.0% of the vote here (3,475 ballots cast), outpolling Republican George W. Bush with 21.9% (1,043 votes) and other candidates with 1.0% (67 votes), among the 4,763 ballots cast by the borough's 6,938 registered voters, for a turnout percentage of 68.7.

In the 2009 gubernatorial election, Democrat Jon Corzine received 69.4% of the vote here (1,786 ballots cast), ahead of Republican Chris Christie with 23.6% (608 votes), Independent Chris Daggett with 5.4% (139 votes) and other candidates with 0.7% (18 votes), among the 2,572 ballots cast by the borough's 7,026 registered voters, yielding a 36.6% turnout.

== Education ==
=== Colleges and universities ===
Two thirds of the buildings of Princeton University were located within the borough (the rest of Princeton University, aside from a small enclave and the Plasma Physics Laboratory in West Windsor Township and land in East Windsor Township, were in the township). However, the university owns more land in West Windsor than in the two Princeton municipalities combined.

Westminster Choir College (part of Rider University) and most of Princeton Theological Seminary were located in the borough.

The Institute for Advanced Study was in the township.

=== Primary and secondary schools ===
==== Public schools ====
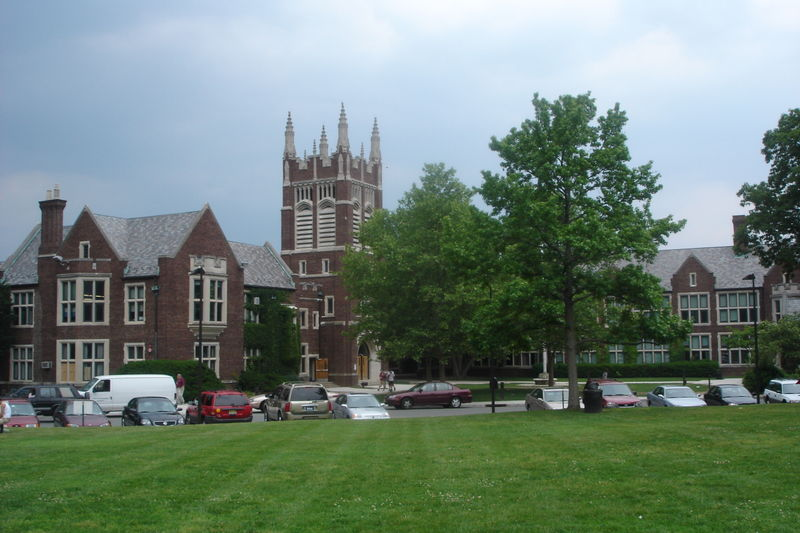
Princeton High School

For grades K through 12, public school students attended the Princeton Regional Schools, a regional school district shared with Princeton Township that also serves students from Cranbury Township, as part of a sending/receiving relationship. All of the district's schools through eighth grade were in the former Princeton Township, with Community Park School being the closest primary school to the defunct borough. The district's high school was located within the borough of Princeton.

The Princeton Charter School, located in the township, opened in September 1997 and serves students from the borough and township who are selected by lottery from among applicants.

==== Private schools ====
Private schools located in the borough include St. Paul School.

=== Public libraries ===
The Princeton Public Library, located in the borough, serves the borough and the township.

== Popular culture ==
Princeton is the setting for the fictional Princeton-Plainsboro Teaching Hospital in the TV series House.

== Sister city ==
- Colmar, Alsace, France.

== Notable people ==
- Wendy Benchley (born 1941), marine and environmental conservation advocate and former Princeton Borough councilwoman who was the wife of author Peter Benchley.
- Charles Browne (1875–1947), mayor of Princeton, New Jersey, from 1914 to 1923 and represented New Jersey's 4th congressional district from 1923 to 1925.
- John Popper, (born 1967), musician.
- Cissy Stuart (1914–1989), Town Topics co-founder and murder victim
