= Princeton Friends School =

Coordinates: 40.3267°N 74.6781°W

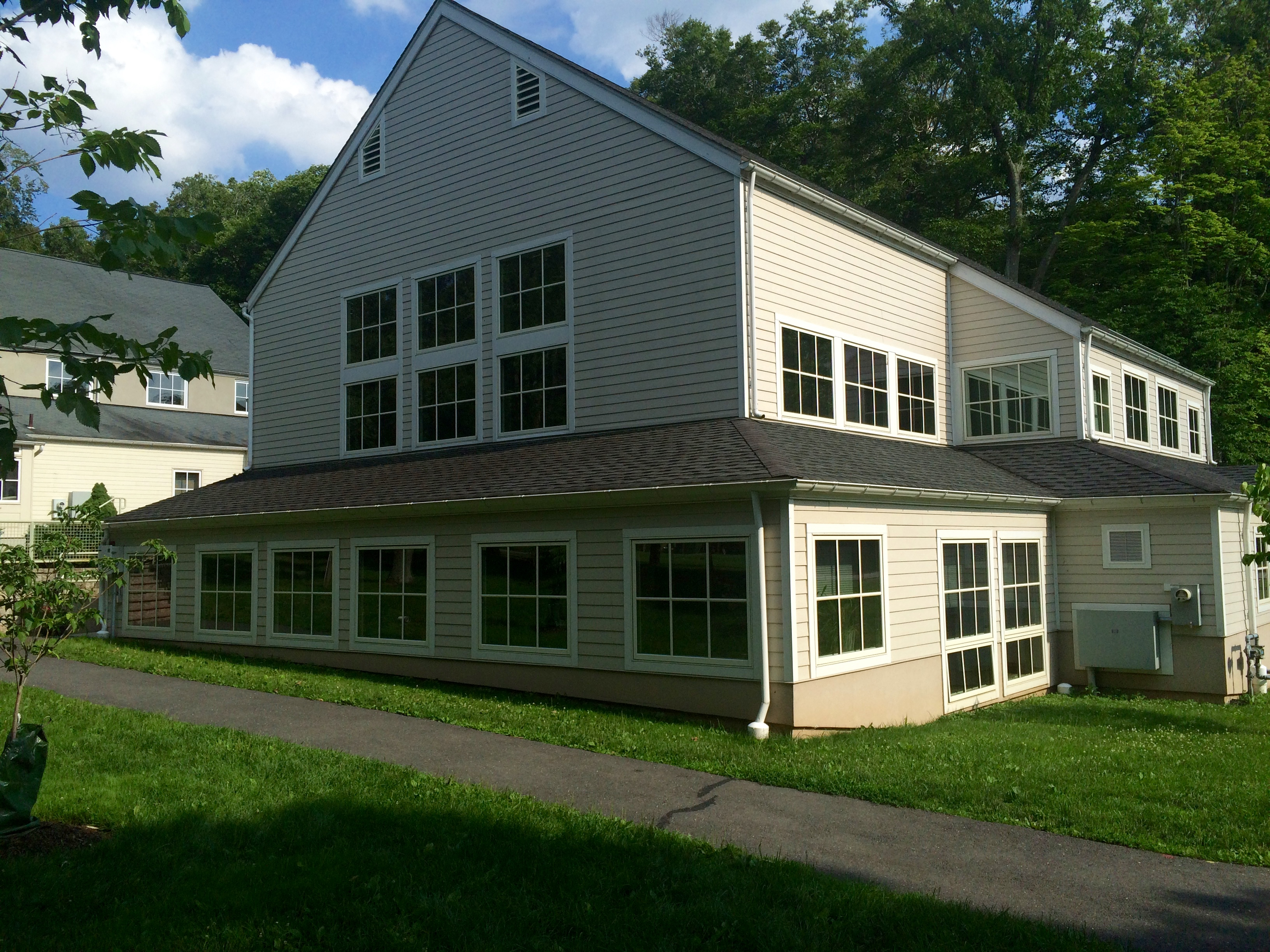

Location
- 470 Quaker Road adjacent to Stony Brook Meeting House and Cemetery; Princeton, NJ 08540; United States

Information
- Type: Independent, Day
- Religious affiliation: Quaker
- Established: 1987
- Faculty: 30
- Age: 4 (Beginning School) to 14 (8th grade)
- Enrollment: 84 (currently 2024)
- Tuition: 2011-2012 school year: $21,750
- Website: www.princetonfriendsschool.org

Princeton Friends School (PFS) is an independent Quaker day pre-Kindergarten-8th grade school in Princeton, New Jersey. It is under the care of Princeton Monthly Meeting and located on the Meeting's historic Stony Brook Meeting House and Cemetery property, adjacent to both the Institute for Advanced Study Woods and the Princeton Battlefield. The school is governed by a board of trustees that includes members of the Religious Society of Friends, attenders of the Princeton Monthly Meeting, parents of students in the school, and members of the broader Princeton community.

== History ==
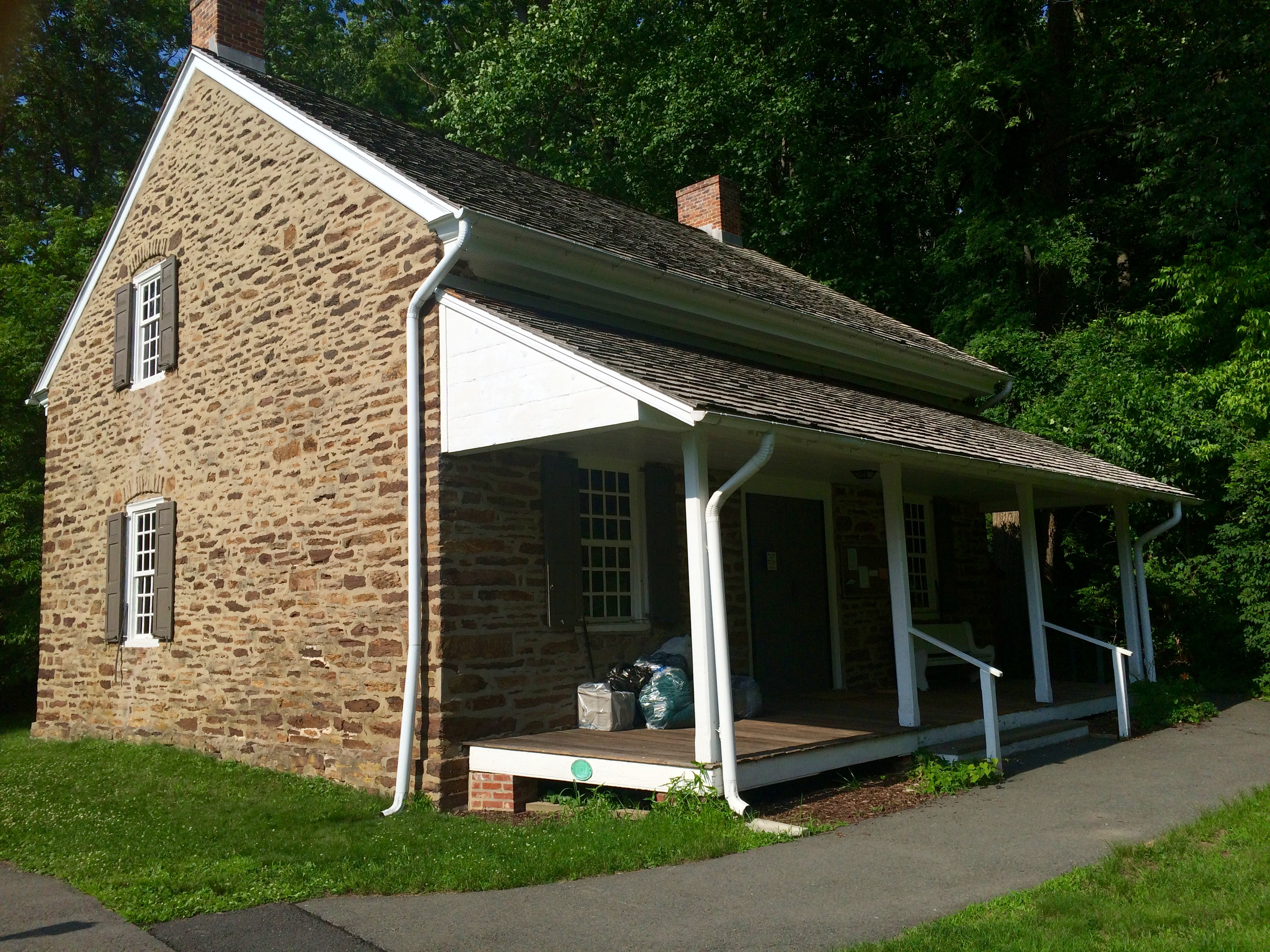
The Stony Brook Meeting House, built 1726

PFS History: "In 1781, a small school was opened in what we now call the Administration Building, on the 10-acre grounds of the Princeton Monthly Meeting. Contrary to the times, the little Quaker school was open to all, and students included children of slaves and Native Americans. A larger one-room schoolhouse, adjacent to the Meetinghouse, was built in 1800 and served the community for decades. After it fell into disrepair, the old schoolhouse was dismantled around 1900.

Almost 100 years later, Princeton Friends School was founded in 1987 by a small group of educators inspired by the ideals of both Friends education and progressive education. Renting space from Princeton Monthly Meeting, and later coming “under the care of” that meeting, the school opened with 19 students in 1st through 7th grades, two full-time teachers (Head of School Jane Fremon and Gale Whittier), and two part-time teachers (Assistant Head Nancy Wilson and PFS math teacher and advisor Richard Fischer). As the school gradually expanded over the following years, Princeton Monthly Meeting gave permission for the construction of a permanent home – the Schoolhouse – on the property.

In September 1997 the Schoolhouse opened its doors, providing for the school a central library, a large assembly space, faculty office space, and six classrooms. Portable classrooms in trailers that had for several years graced what is known as the school's “back circle” were retired, and Princeton Friends School now had the space to serve its enrollment of 125 students.

Ten years later, West House, with its two primary classrooms, two science labs, a Learning Center, an art room, and a nurse's office, opened its doors in September 2008. An outdoor hard-surface play court, an expanded playground, and a pair of outbuildings were also included in this project. "

As of 2024, the interim headmaster is Craig Sellers. There is a search for a permanent head of school.
