= Princeton Charter School =

School in New Jersey

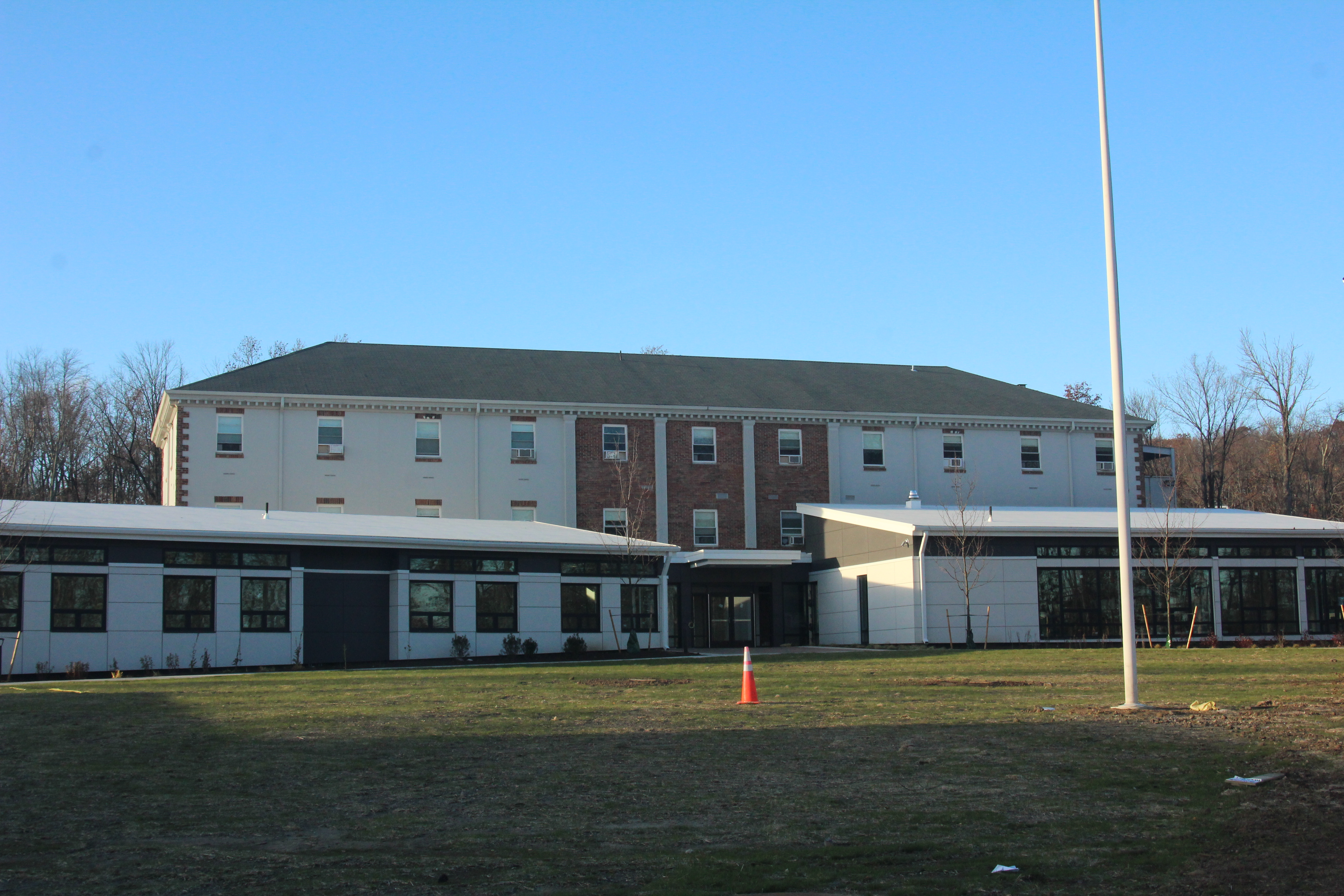

Location
- 100 Bunn Drive; Princeton, New Jersey
- 40°22′09.2″N 74°39′25.3″W

Information
- Type: Charter School
- Religious affiliation: None
- Established: 1997
- Headmaster: Lawrence D. Patton
- Faculty: 41.4 FTEs
- Enrollment: 424 (as of 2022–23)
- Student to teacher ratio: 10.3:1
- Campus: 7 acres (2.8 ha)
- Color: Red/Black
- Mascot: Hawk
- Website: princetoncharter.org

The Princeton Charter School (PCS) is a K-8 Charter school in Princeton, New Jersey. Admission to the school is by lottery, available to all residents of the town, and free of charge. The school was founded in 1997, following the passage, by the New Jersey Legislature, of the Charter School Program Act of 1995. From the original class of 72, the school has grown to around 400 students. Students from the school go on to Princeton High School or one of several private schools in and around Princeton. The Charter School is a top academic performer statewide, especially in standardized testing, with 91% of students proficient in math and 92% of students proficient in reading. In 2019, the school was ranked as having the best teachers in the state by Niche.com. The main focus of Princeton Charter School's academics is on "core academic skills", with an emphasis on English and mathematics, which meet daily for one hour, while classes such as history and science meet daily for 45 minutes. A silent reading period is built into the schedule for students to receive individual help, as well as three recess period for all grades.

As of the 2022–23 school year, the school had an enrollment of 424 students and 41.4 classroom teachers (on an FTE basis), for a student–teacher ratio of 10.3:1. Enrollment by Race/Ethnicity was Asian (200), White (143), Hispanic (16), Black (16), two or more races (46), Native Hawaiian/Pacific Islander (3), and Native American (0). There were 40 students in kindergarten, while the largest classes were 4th-8th with 50 (there were 48 students in the 7th grade). There were 203 male students and 219 female students. There are about 50 students in each grade, with smaller class sizes intended to provide a more "close-knit" atmosphere for students, and to allow them “to be known and to feel known”.

== History ==
=== Founding ===
The idea of the school was conceived in 1996 following the passage of the Charter School Program Act of 1995 by a group of local parents who wanted a “rigorous curricula, with well-defined grade-by-grade outcomes in line with state, national, and international standards, focusing on cumulative acquisition of knowledge and skills in academic areas.” After trying to work through the local schools, the decision was made to establish a charter school. This announcement was controversial, especially on the local school board, which feared that the school would be a financial drain on the school district's resources. On October 14, 1997, the Regional Board of Education passed a resolution urging the state Department of Education to "deny any waivers or changes that would increase the approved rate of growth of the Princeton Charter School." In November, School Board Vice President Michael Littman stated that the school board's policy would be "to interact with the Charter School at the minimum level required by law." Reasons for the opposition were based on fears of lack of accountability and a negative financial impact on Princeton Public Schools.

Once the charter was drawn up, the founders searched for employees and a building, settling on a former office building in North Princeton, which was purchased for 2.8 million dollars. In May 1997, the school hired its first Head of School, Charles Marsee.

A third of all parents with children eligible for the school applied, and the school opened in 1997. In its first year, the school had high test scores, and the second school year began in 1998.

=== Early years ===
Princeton Charter School was the first charter school in the nation accredited by the American Academy of Liberal Education when it was accredited in 2002.

In September of that year, the school completed its K-4 building and opened it to students. That same month, the United States Department of Education named Princeton Charter School a No Child Left Behind Blue Ribbon School. Five years later, work began on the campus center addition.

=== Expansion ===
==== 2016 expansion proposal ====
The school completed the campus center addition in 2010. In late 2016, Princeton Charter School submitted a request to the New Jersey Department of Education to expand enrollment by 76 students within two years, planning as well to introduce a weighted lottery, prompting debate and legal action from Princeton Public Schools. On March 20, 2018, Princeton Public Schools board member Dafna Kendal proposed that PPS would cease its litigation if PCS agreed to limit its number of admitted students. In response, Paul Josephson, president of the PCS Board of Trustees, emphasized that the spot of any student offered admission would be protected, but refused to directly answer Kendal's proposal.

The expansion, currently under construction, will add four classrooms, a new cafeteria, and an expanded parking lot. Additionally, two amphitheaters will be added, as well as new playground equipment and a relocated basketball court. Electric vehicle charging stations are also being considered for the parking lot.

=== COVID-19 ===
During the COVID-19 pandemic, Princeton Charter School switched to a remote learning schedule starting March 16, 2020.

== Awards and recognition ==
In 2023, the school was one of nine schools in New Jersey, and the only charter school, that was recognized as a National Blue Ribbon School by the United States Department of Education.

== Education program ==
=== Mission ===
Princeton Charter School's mission statement claims that the school aims to "provide its diverse student body the best possible education by focusing on the fundamental academic disciplines in an atmosphere that affirms academic achievement and, in so doing, to offer the community true choice in public education."

==== Admission ====
Princeton Charter School admits students through a lottery system, weighted for students who are economically disadvantaged in order to "reduce achievement gaps by eliminating an important cause — the insufficient mastery of basic knowledge and skills required for further academic achievement.” The lottery system also has a sibling preference, in which a student's sibling can be admitted to the school without their name being drawn, which according to Head of School Lawrence Patton "played a significant part in increasing the number of economically disadvantaged students".

=== Curriculum ===
Princeton Charter School places great emphasis on teaching students in their younger years, and begins serious education earlier than many other schools. The curriculum mostly focuses on language arts, mathematics, science, history and geography, foreign languages, and the arts.

Students must complete certain "milestones" for each grade. For example, the first grade English milestone requires students to be able to read a text at the level of Dr. Seuss, the sixth-grade physical education milestone involves running a half-mile, and the eighth-grade French milestone consists of a presentation given about a work of art.

The curriculum is reviewed in all subjects by parents, educators, and outside experts as part of the school's Curriculum Committee process.

=== Sports ===
Princeton Charter School has a variety of sports teams, listed below:

- Boys Basketball
- Girls Basketball
- Cross Country
- Field Hockey
- Boys Lacrosse
- Girls Lacrosse
- Soccer

Cross country home meets are held at the nearby Smoyer Park. Field Hockey and soccer home games are held on the athletic field.

=== Clubs ===
Princeton Charter School has a variety of clubs, including a jazz ensemble for grades 5-8 and a Mathcounts team, as well as an orchestra, piano ensemble, an art club, and a chess club. The school's National Science Bowl team won the NJ Regional finals from 2018-2021, and 2023-2025 and moved on to the national competition in Washington, D.C. The school's Operation Smile club, founded in 2017, was named "Best New Club of the Year" at Operation Smile's International Student Leadership Conference in July 2018.

== Administration ==
The administration of Princeton Charter School consists of the head of school and two assistant heads of school, one in charge of the K-4 Division, one in charge of the 5-8 Division. The current head of school is Lawrence Patton, while the K-4 and 5-8 assistant heads of school are Gail Wilbur and Lisa Eckstrom, respectively.

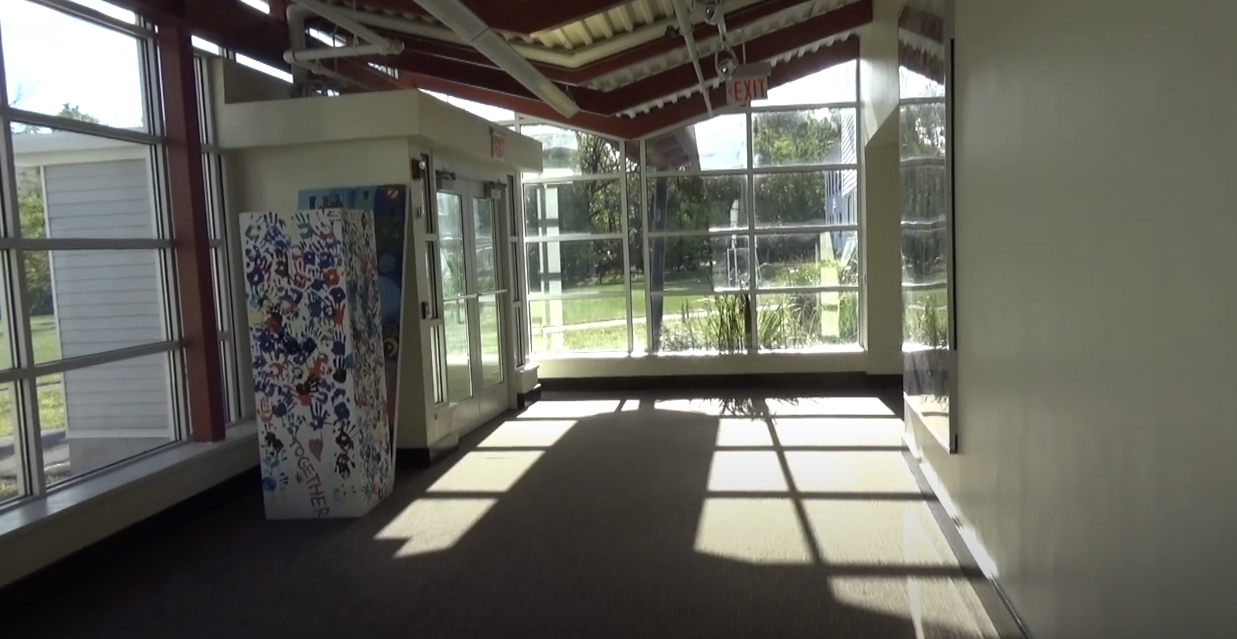
The interior of the Princeton Charter School Campus Center, facing the field

== Campus ==
The school is located on a seven-acre plot in north-western Princeton. There are two main school buildings, the 5-8 building, a three-story former office building renovated between 1997 and 1999, and the K-4 building, designed by Princeton University architect Ralph Lerner.

=== Other buildings ===
In 2010, the Campus Center addition was completed, a 17,000 square foot facility including a black-box theater, a gymnasium, and art classrooms. All students have daily classes in the Campus Center.

The administrative offices are located in the Marsee Center, an 1800s farmhouse at the north end of the campus named for former head of school Charles Marsee. The campus also contains a large field, used for sports, and a playground.

=== Transportation ===
Princeton Charter School's transportation is mainly provided by the regional school district.

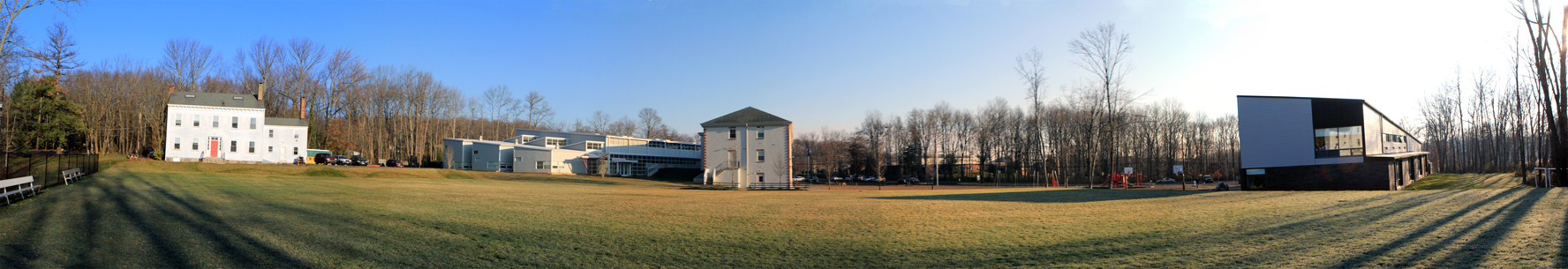
Panorama of the campus (from left to right: Marsee Center, Campus Center, 5-8 building, K-4 building)
