= Washington Oak =

Protected ancient tree in the United States

Coordinates: 40°19′51″N 74°41′10″W

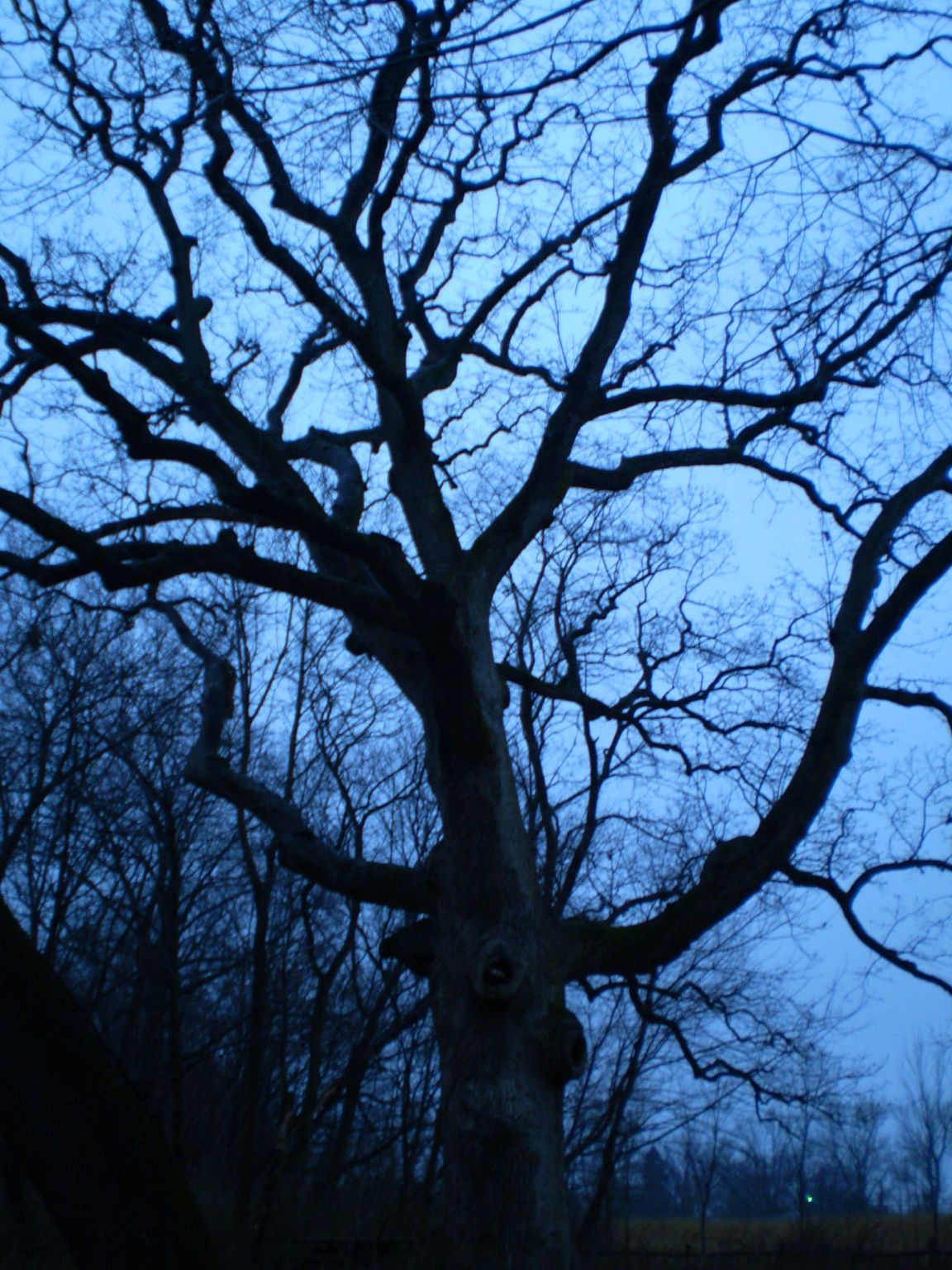
2009

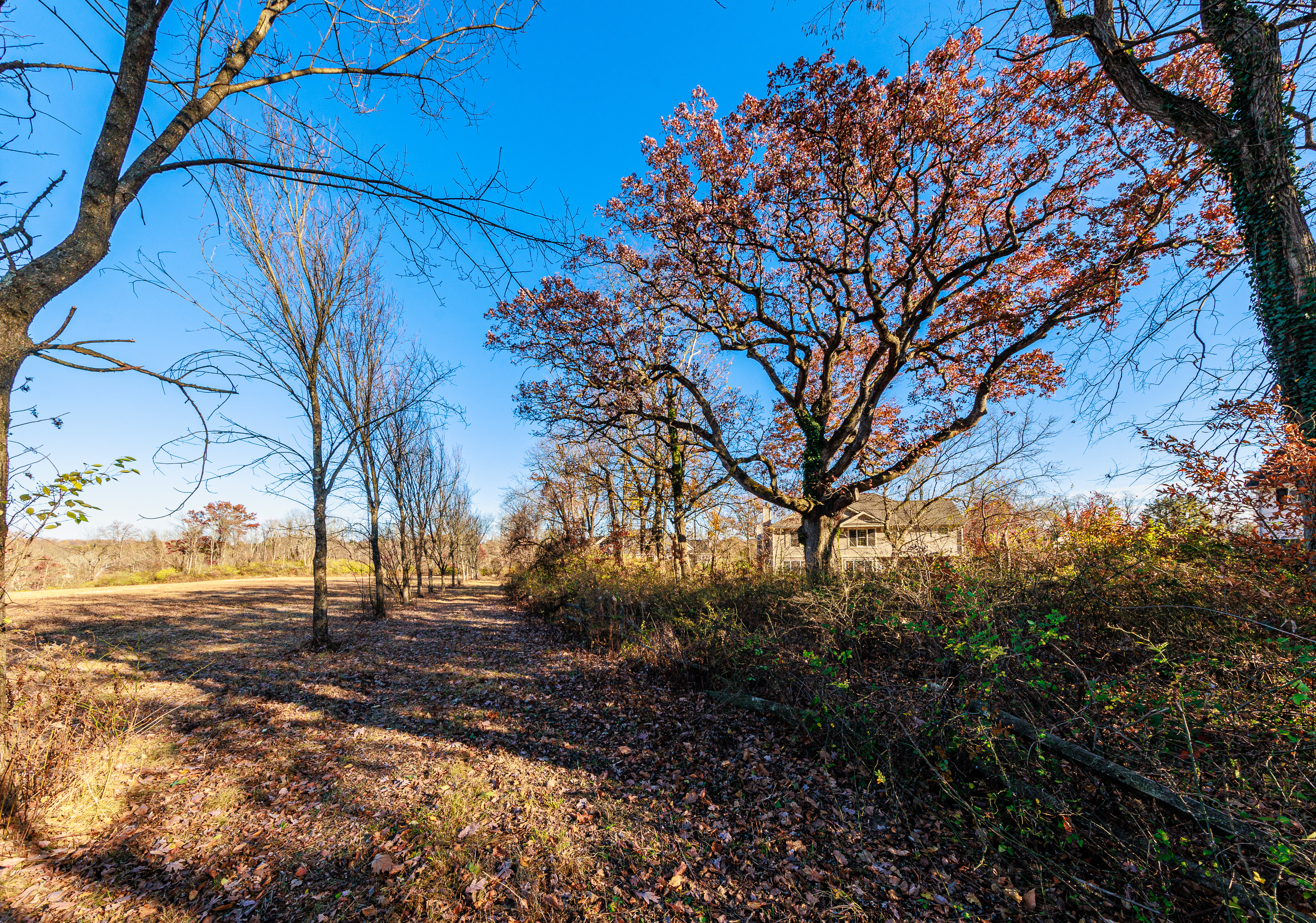
2024

The Washington Oak is a protected ancient white oak tree in Princeton, New Jersey, USA that overlooks the Princeton Battlefield State Park. The International Society of Arboriculture and the Tree Care Industry Association jointly recognize the Washington Oak as having lived at the time of the signing of the United States Constitution in 1787.

== Place in history ==
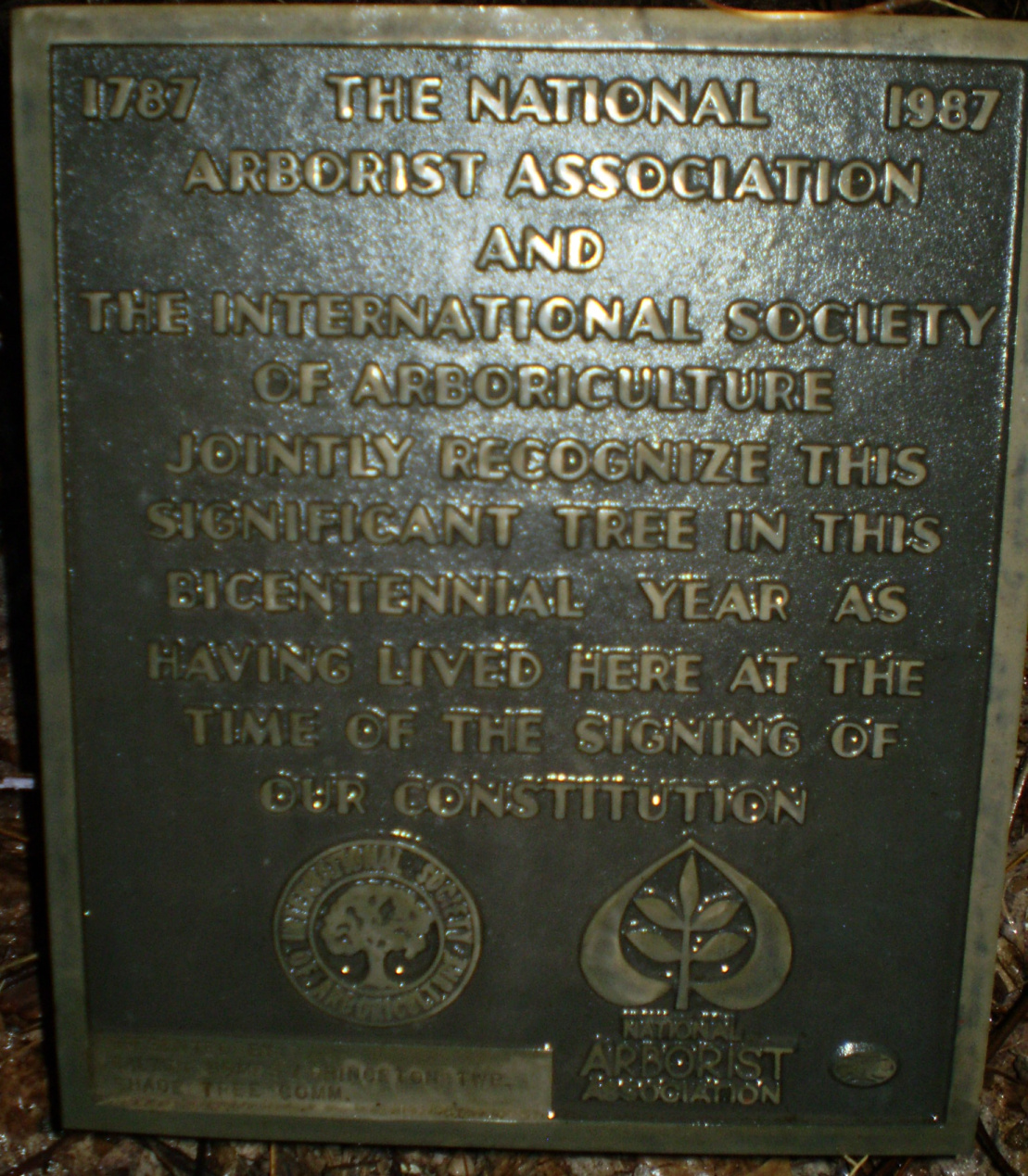
Plaque at the foot of the tree which recognizes the oak's longevity

The Washington Oak, over 275 years old, stands on Millett's Hill where the pivotal Battle of Princeton was ignited in 1777. On the morning of January 3 British Lt. Colonel Charles Mawhood's regiment marched out of Princeton on the Kings Highway (Rt. 206) to reinforce Trenton. But as they approached the top of the hill, Mawhood's men caught sight of General Mercer's forces massing on the other side of the Stony Brook. They reversed direction, recrossed the Brook and engaged the Americans. When Mercer's troops broke, General George Washington, the tree's namesake, rallied them to victory.

== Development pressure ==
The tree and its surroundings were the scene of a bitter, protracted dispute between a builder, the Township, and the State over development rights. In 1983 Calton Homes acquired the White Farm which included the Washington Oak. Calton planned to build over 1200 homes on the 124-acre (0.50 km^{2}) property, but Township zoning limited the density of homes, allowing only 40. Calton sued the Township arguing the zoning requirements did not comply with the New Jersey Supreme Court's Mount Laurel rulings which required municipalities to develop affordable housing for low- and middle-income families. This "second battle of Princeton" gathered so much attention that Gov. Thomas Kean referred to it in his 1989 State of the State address, claiming the farm was "threatened by weapons the British never carried" and "what General Howe and his British troops could never do, townhouses ... are poised to do: win a battle over ... New Jersey." Later that year the parties settled, allowing Calton to build 300 properties on 73 acres (300,000 m^{2}) while the preserving the Washington Oak and its nearby meadow as open space. The resulting development, Washington Oaks at Princeton, provides 60 low- and moderate-income condominium units mixed with 240 market-rate single-family detached houses, townhouses, and condominiums.

== See also ==
- List of individual trees
