= Stony Brook Meeting House and Cemetery =

Stony Brook Meetinghouse
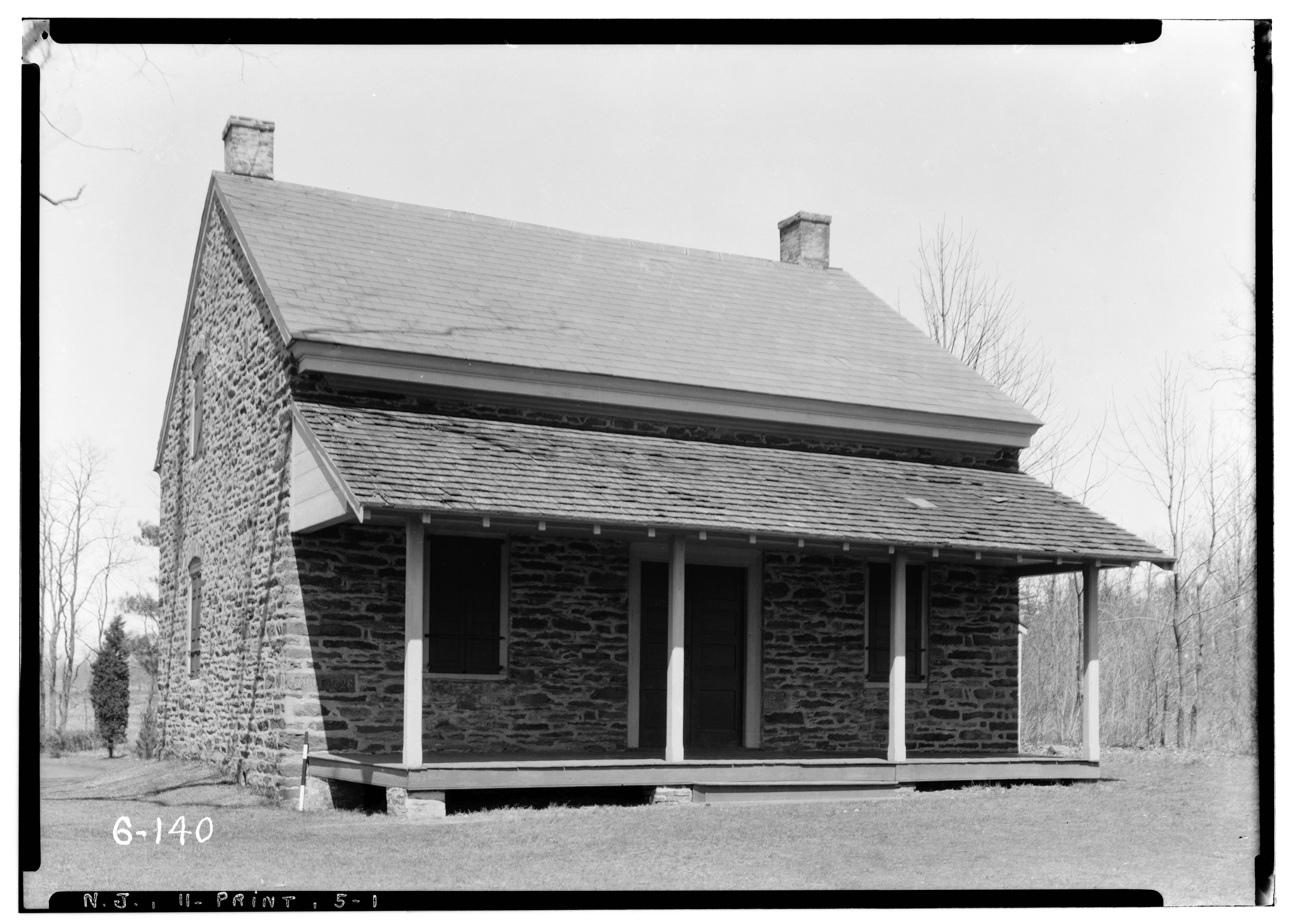
- The meetinghouse in 1936 from the Historic American Buildings Survey
- Stony Brook Meetinghouse
- Location: 470 Quaker Rd, Princeton, New Jersey 08540
- Country: United States
- Denomination: Quaker

History
- Founded: 1726
- Princeton Battlefield / Stony Brook Village Historic District
- U.S. National Register of Historic Places
- U.S. Historic district – Contributing property
- Location within Mercer County, New Jersey Location within New Jersey Location within the United States
- Coordinates: 40°19′36.8″N 74°40′39.0″W
- NRHP reference No.: 89000761
- Added to NRHP: October 10, 1989

Stony Brook Meeting House and Cemetery are historic Quaker sites located at the Stony Brook Settlement at the intersection of Princeton Pike/Mercer Road and Quaker Road in Princeton, New Jersey, United States. The first Europeans to settle in the Princeton area were six Quaker families who built their homes near the Stony Brook around 1696. In 1709 Benjamin Clark deeded nine and three-fifths acres in trust to Richard Stockton and others to establish a Friends meeting house and burial ground.

== Meeting house ==
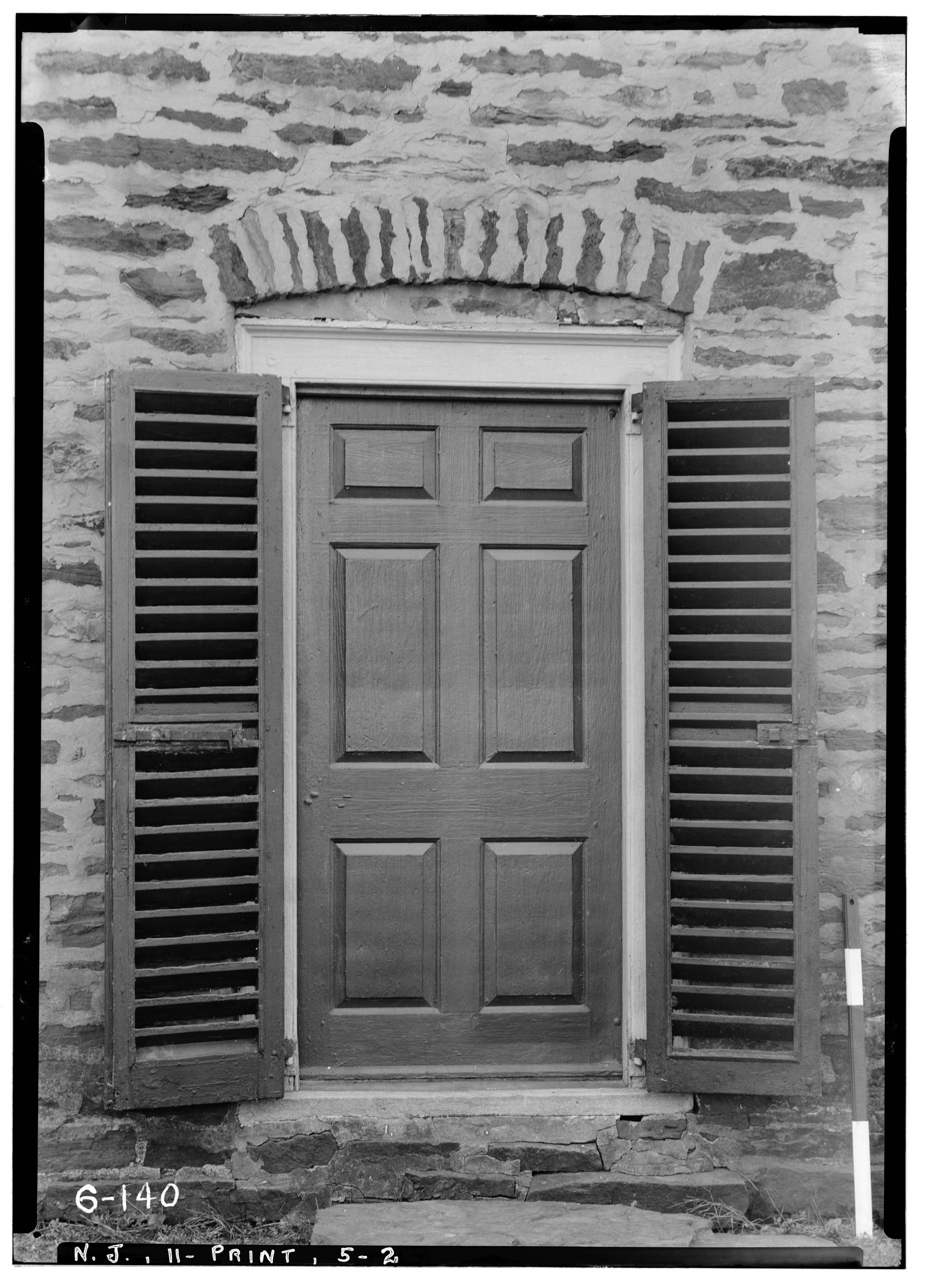
Detail of a window

The original meeting house was constructed in 1726, but in time the structure failed in a fire, so the second stone building was built on the original foundation in 1760 as close to original as possible. By the Battle of Princeton in 1777, the meeting house was situated at the edge of open fields and faced towards a road connecting Quaker Road with downtown Princeton (Princeton Pike was not constructed until about 1855). Though tall hardwood trees of the Princeton Battlefield State Park and Institute Woods cover those fields today, the meeting house offered a clear line of sight to the opening skirmish at William Clarke's orchard. Today, the Clarke house and Quaker meeting house are connected by trails which have existed since the early 1700s.

Today, the Princeton Monthly Meeting of the Philadelphia Yearly Meeting of the Religious Society of Friends holds worship services in the meeting house on the First Day ("Sunday") at 9:00 & 11:00 am. Princeton Friends School holds "Settling In", a version of Quaker meeting, each week in the meeting house.

== Cemetery ==
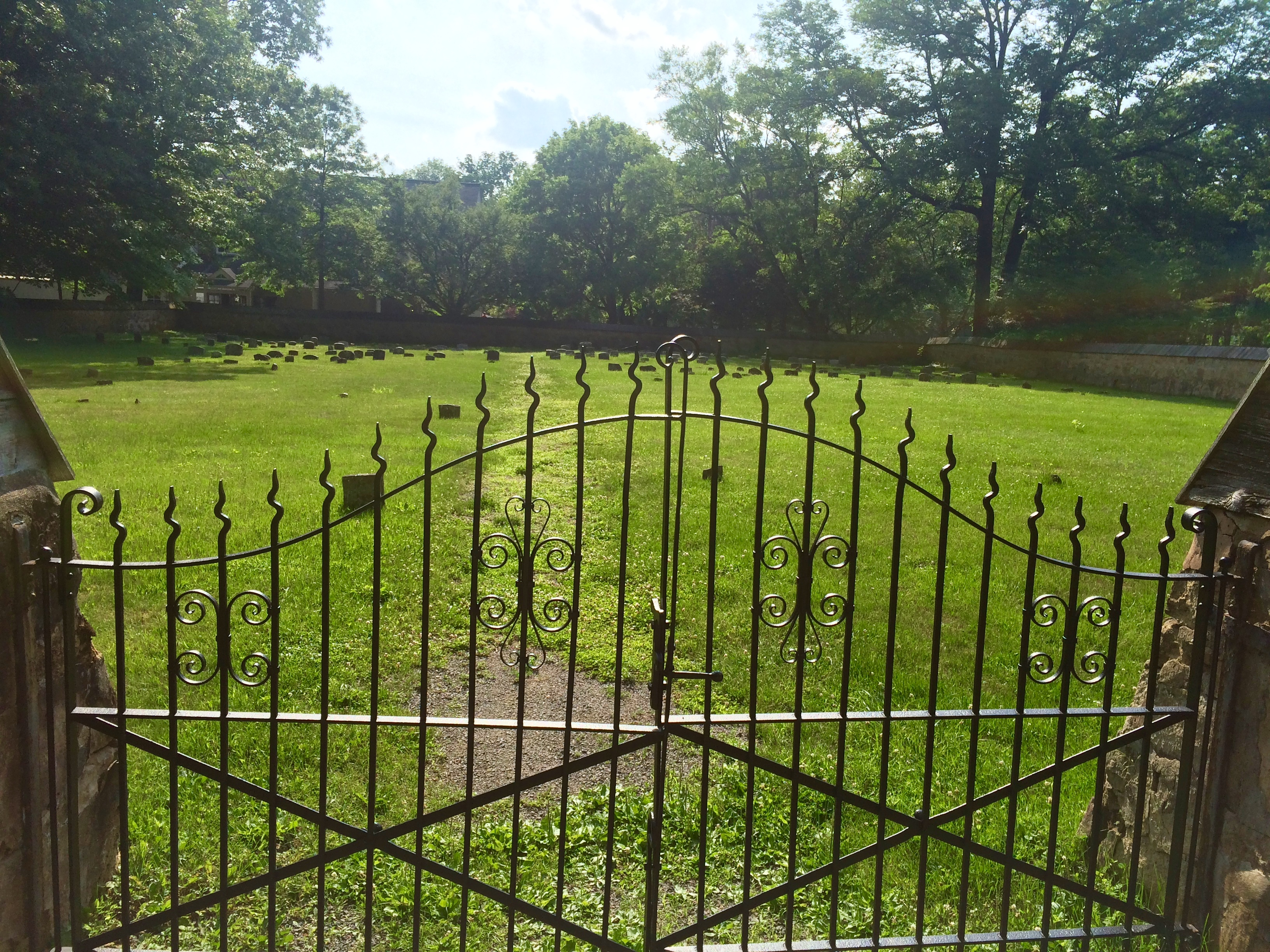

The cemetery is enclosed on three sides by a stone wall and adjoins the meeting house and First Day School (the Quaker expression for "Sunday School"). It was the earliest and most prominent burial ground in Princeton before the Revolutionary War. Friends traditionally expressed their commitments to simplicity and the equality of all persons by discouraging elaborate grave markers. While some graves in the cemetery are marked by plain stones that bear the name and dates of birth and death, many others are unmarked. Historical tradition of Quakers at the time was to place a simple unmarked stone marker at each grave site. Richard Ridgway (one of the founders of the Meeting Hall) is one of the prominent burials, but which marker is unknown.

=== Noted interments ===
- Richard Stockton (October 1, 1730 – February 28, 1781) – lawyer, jurist, legislator, and a signer of the Declaration of Independence.
- Charles Smith Olden (February 19, 1799 – April 7, 1876) – Republican Party politician, who served as the 19th Governor of New Jersey from 1860 to 1863.
- Richard Ridgway, Arrived by ship from England in 1690 with wife and child. Owned over 400 acres in the area and donated some to Quaker Friends use.

== Nearby structures ==
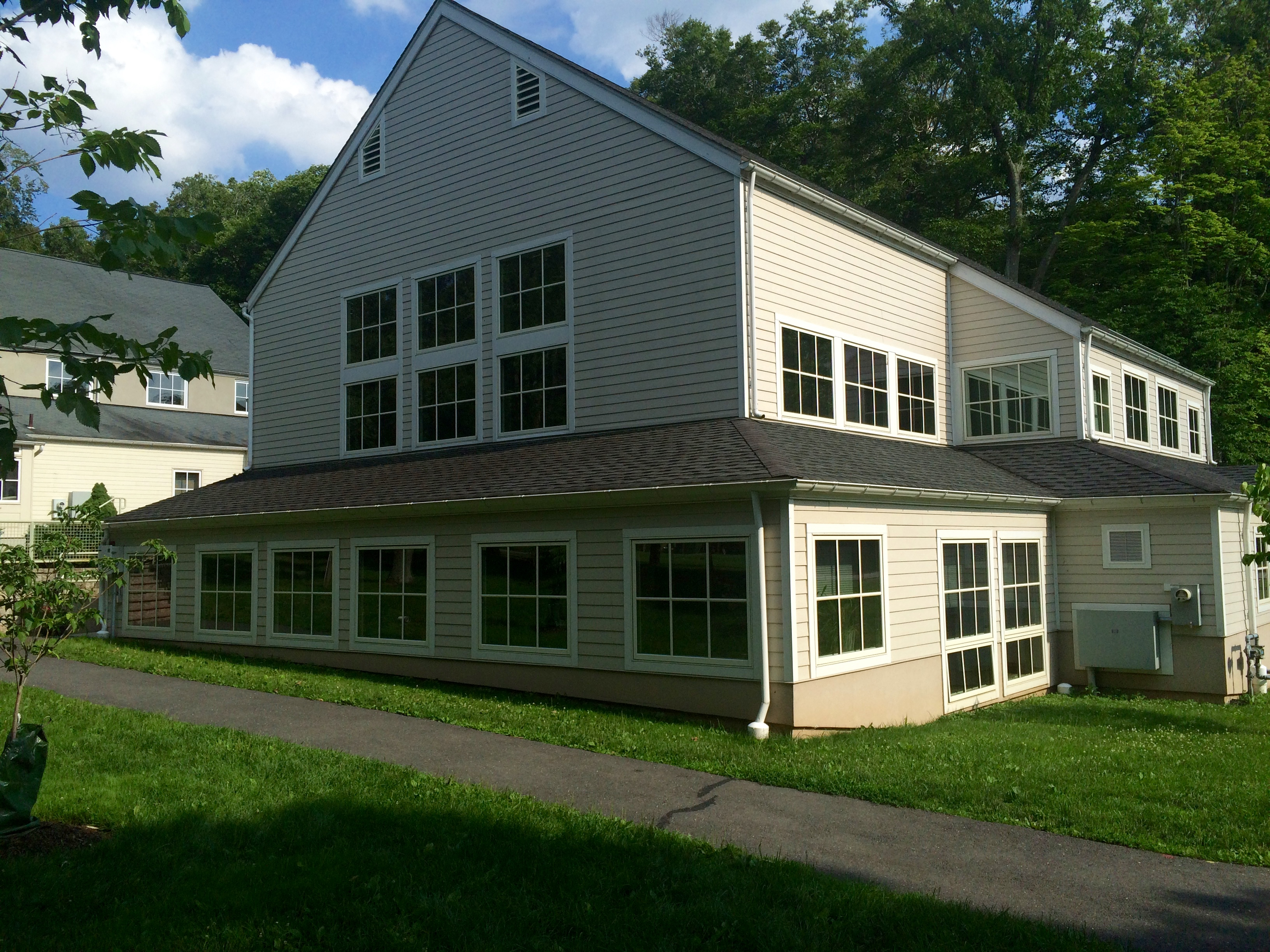
The Princeton Friends School

Soon after the meeting house was built, the Quakers at Stony Brook built a school to teach their children. Primary education continued until about 1901 when the schoolhouse was taken down. In the 1950s, the Meeting built a multi-purpose building to support the First Day School.

The Princeton Friends School restored elementary education to this historic site in 1987; in 1997 the school completed its own $1.8 million schoolhouse. In the Fall of 2007 the school broke ground for a second building. The school uses the schoolmaster's house, built in the 1800s near the cemetery, to support its arts curriculum. A 225-year-old Quaker farmhouse houses the school's administrative offices.
