= Princeton Public Schools =

School district in Mercer County, New Jersey, US

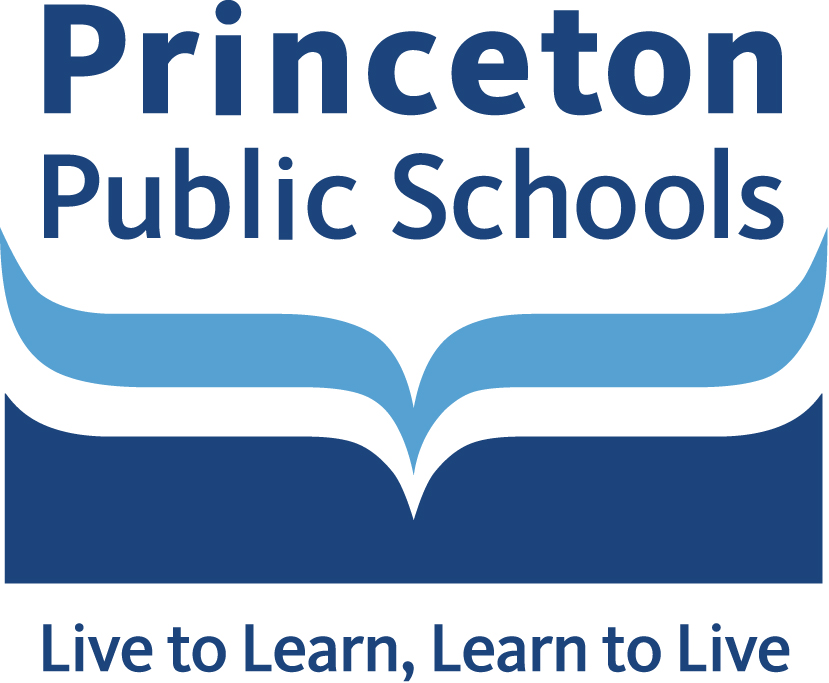

Address
- 25 Valley Road Princeton, Mercer County, New Jersey, 08540; United States
- Coordinates: 40.361361°N 74.663579°W

District information
- Grades: PreK-12
- Superintendent: Michael LaSusa
- Business administrator: Andrew Harris
- Schools: 6

Students and staff
- Enrollment: 3,827 (as of 2023–24)
- Faculty: 353.4 FTEs
- Student–teacher ratio: 10.83:1

Other information
- District Factor Group: I
- Website: www.princetonk12.org
Ind.	Per pupil	District spending	Rank (*)	K-12 average	%± vs. average
1A	Total Spending	$23,803	66	$18,891	26.0%
1	Budgetary Cost	18,688	65	14,783	26.4%
2	Classroom Instruction	11,304	67	8,763	29.0%
6	Support Services	3,340	63	2,392	39.6%
8	Administrative Cost	1,629	49	1,485	9.7%
10	Operations & Maintenance	1,920	56	1,783	7.7%
13	Extracurricular Activities	448	48	268	67.2%
16	Median Teacher Salary	76,671	66	64,043
Data from NJDoE 2014 Taxpayers' Guide to Education Spending. *Of K-12 districts with 1,800-3,500 students. Lowest spending=1; Highest=68

Princeton Public Schools (PPS) is a comprehensive community public school district that serves students in pre-kindergarten through twelfth grade from Princeton, in Mercer County, in the U.S. state of New Jersey. Students from Cranbury Township attend the district's high school as part of a sending/receiving relationship. The district administration building is at 25 Valley Road in Princeton.

As of the 2023–24 school year, the district, comprising six schools, had an enrollment of 3,827 students and 353.4 classroom teachers (on an FTE basis), for a student–teacher ratio of 10.83:1.

Residents of Princeton University's housing complexes for graduate students with families, Lawrence Apartments and Stanworth Apartments, are zoned to the district.

== History ==
The district's high school was constructed in 1927 and the middle school in 1965. The four elementary schools were completed from 1957 to 1962.

The district was known as the Princeton Regional School District until July 2012, when the Princeton Public Schools name went into effect. The board changed the name in a February 2012 vote, in which the end of regionalization due to the consolidation of the independent borough and township (Borough of Princeton and Princeton Township) into a single municipality in January 2013 was cited as the reason behind the name change.

The district had been classified by the New Jersey Department of Education as being in District Factor Group "I", the second-highest of eight groupings. District Factor Groups organize districts statewide to allow comparison by common socioeconomic characteristics of the local districts. From lowest socioeconomic status to highest, the categories are A, B, CD, DE, FG, GH, I and J.

=== Former, renamed and converted schools ===
- Witherspoon Street School for Colored Children, educated the African-American students of Princeton from 1858 until desegregation in 1948.
- Valley Road School educated children in Princeton Township from 1918 until 1980 when it was converted to offices. It was the first school constructed in the former Princeton Township by the regional district and became the district's first integrated elementary school in 1948.
- John Witherspoon Middle School was the former name of Princeton Middle School from its construction in 1966 to 2020. The name was changed on June 15, 2020, with a vote of 8-1 from the Princeton Public Schools School Board following the George Floyd protests, due to the school's namesake being a slave owner. The school was renamed Princeton Middle School in 2021 after temporarily being named Princeton Unified Middle School for the 2020-2021 school year.

== Awards, recognition, and rankings ==
Niche ranked Princeton Public Schools as the 16th best school district in America and the best school district in New Jersey in its "2021 Best School Districts" rankings.

Littlebrook School was one of nine public schools recognized in 2017 as Blue Ribbon Schools by the United States Department of Education.

In 2000-01, the district was recognized by the New Jersey Department of Education with the Best Practices award for its Jefferson Debates Citizenship / Character Education program for students in Grades 6-8.

== Schools ==
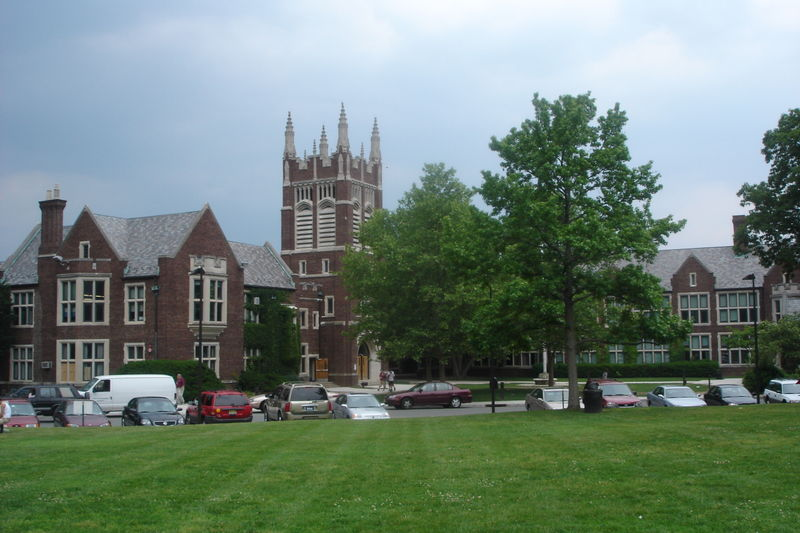
Princeton High School

Schools in the district (with 2020–21 enrollment data from the National Center for Education Statistics) are:

Elementary Schools

- Community Park School with 332 students in grades K-5
  - Dineen Gruchacz, principal
- Johnson Park School with 329 students in grades PreK-5
  - Stacy Young, principal
- Littlebrook School with 342 students in grades K-5
  - Luis Ramirez, principal
- Riverside School with 289 students in grades PreK-5
  - Max Actau, principal

Middle School

- Princeton Middle School with 803 students in grades 6-8
  - Jason Burr, principal

High School

- Princeton High School with 1,555 students in grades 9-12
  - Cecilia Birge, principal

== Administration ==
Core members of the district's administration are:

- Michael LaSusa, superintendent
- Andrew Harris, business administrator and board secretary

After a unanimous vote from the Board of Education in January 2025, LaSusa started as Superintendent on July 1, 2025 after previously working in the School District of the Chathams for 24 years. Starting there in 2001 as a teacher, he eventually became Superintendent, serving for 13 years. Dr. Kathie Foster was the interim superintendent in Princeton from November 2023 to June 2025 after the resignation of Dr. Carol Kelley, who left the position in October 2023.

== Board of education ==
The district's board of education, consisting of nine members, sets policy and oversees the fiscal and educational operation of the district through its administration. As a Type II school district, the board's trustees are elected directly by voters to serve three-year terms of office on a staggered basis, with three seats up for election each year held (since 2013) as part of the November general election. The board appoints a superintendent to oversee the district's day-to-day operations and a business administrator to supervise the business functions of the district. A tenth represented is appointed by the Cranbury district to represent its interests on the Princeton Board of Education.
