= Mercer Oak =

White oak tree in Princeton, New Jersey

Coordinates: 40.3297°N 74.6746°W

the Mercer Oak in during a 1998 celebration

The Mercer Oak was a large white oak tree that stood in Princeton Battlefield State Park in Princeton, New Jersey. The tree was about 300 years old when it was torn by strong winds in March 2000. It was the emblem of Princeton Township and appeared on the seal of the township. The tree is also the key element of the seal of Mercer County, New Jersey.

== Description and history ==
The Mercer Oak was named after Hugh Mercer, a brigadier general in the Continental Army during the American Revolution. During the Battle of Princeton, Mercer was stabbed by an English soldier's bayonet. According to legend, he was unwilling to abandon his troops, and rested on the tree's trunk while they stood their ground. After the battle, Mercer was taken to the Clarke House where he died from his injuries nine days later.

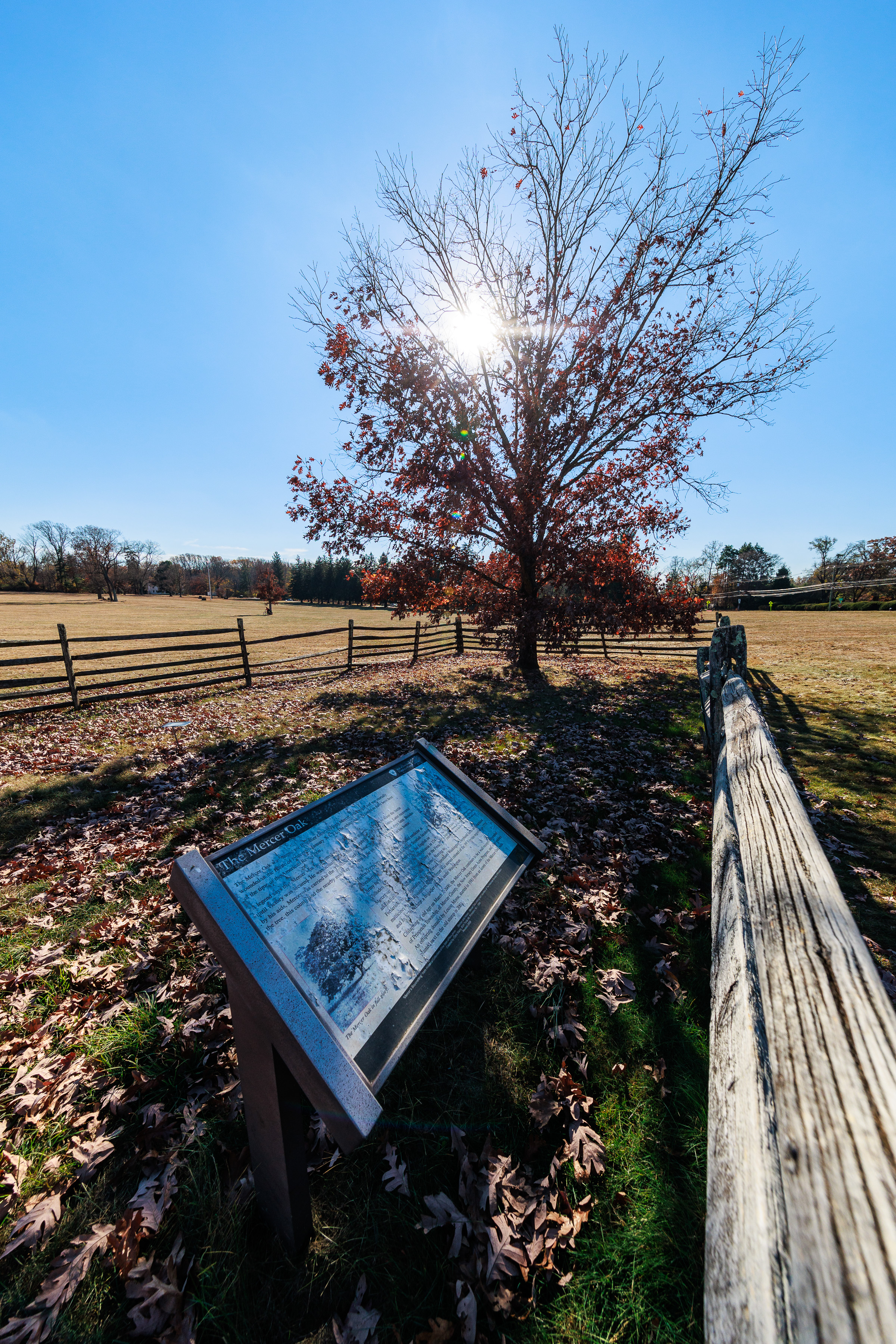
Mercer Oak scion in 2024

After a lightning storm in 1973 dropped a large branch of the original "Mercer Oak," Ned Brown, a local artisan cabinet fabricator from Skillman, NJ, had the insight to preserve some of the lumber. Pieces of the preserved lumber were later integrated into the woodwork of a local restaurant. The inlay includes the craftsman's representation of a silhouette of the oak tree, as well as sections of oak throughout the bar. The balance of the fallen branches were left in the hands of Princeton's Historical Society.

On March 3, 2000, a wind storm felled the oak's last four branches. For public safety reasons, arborists cut off the remnants of the trunk the day after the tree fell. Following the tree's death, several scions from the tree were planted around the battlefield. In May 2000, an 8-foot sapling grown from a Mercer Oak acorn was planted inside the stump of the former tree.

== See also ==
- List of individual trees
