= Princeton North, New Jersey =

Populated place in Mercer County, New Jersey, US

- Unincorporated community
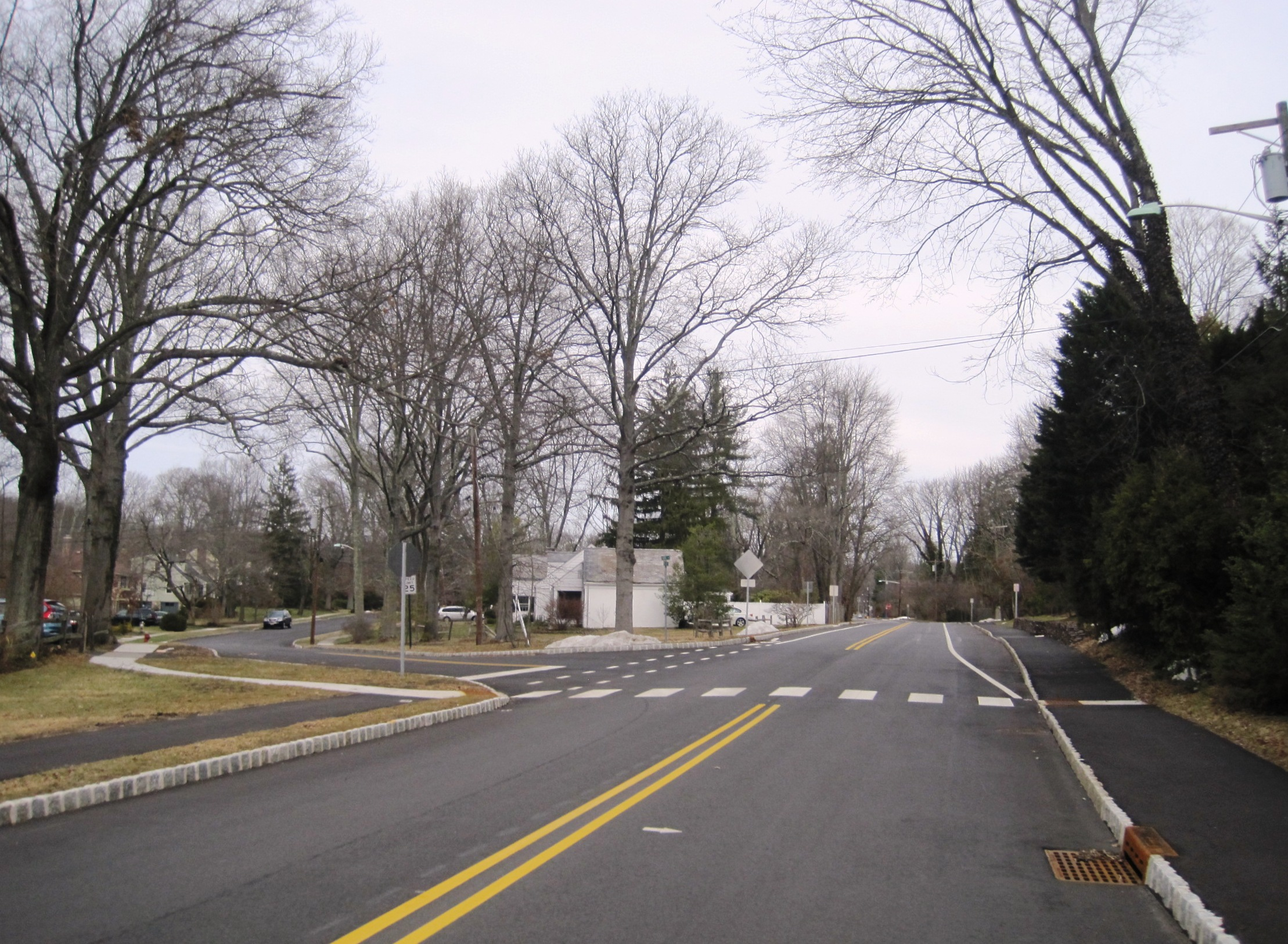
- Mount Lucas and Laurel Roads in Princeton North

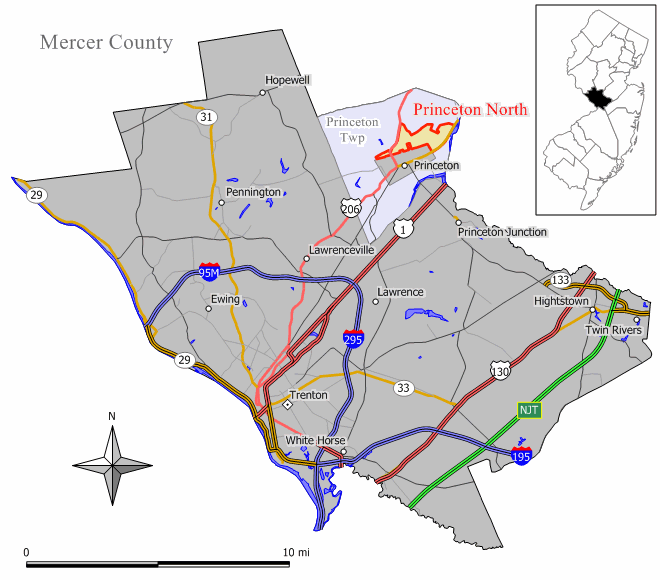
- Map of Princeton North in Mercer County. Inset: Location of Mercer County in New jersey.
- Coordinates: 40°21′41″N 74°39′7″W
- Country: United States
- State: New Jersey
- County: Mercer
- Borough: Princeton

Area
  - Total: 1.6 sq mi (4.2 km^{2})
  - Land: 1.6 sq mi (4.2 km^{2})
  - Water: 0 sq mi (0.0 km^{2})

Population (2000)
  - Total: 4,528
  - Density: 2,797/sq mi (1,079.8/km^{2})
- Time zone: UTC−05:00 (Eastern (EST))
  - Summer (DST): UTC−04:00 (Eastern (EDT))
- FIPS code: 34-60990

Princeton North, also known as North Princeton, is an unincorporated community that is located in Princeton, in Mercer County, in the U.S. state of New Jersey. As of the 2000 census, the CDP population was 4,528. While the area was categorized as a census-designated place in the 2000 Census, the CDP status was eliminated by the United States Census Bureau as of the 2010 census. The community is located in what was formerly Princeton Township.

== Geography ==
Princeton North is located at 40°21′41″N 74°39′07″W (40.361506, -74.651988).

According to the United States Census Bureau, the CDP has a total area of 4.2 km^{2} (1.6 sq mi), all land.

== Demographics ==
Historical population
Census	Pop.	Note	%±
1950	1,721		—
1960	4,506		161.8%
1970	5,488		21.8%
1980	4,814		−12.3%
1990	4,386		−8.9%
2000	4,528		3.2%
Population sources: 1950 1960 1960-1980; 1970 1980 1990 2000; 2010

The first appeared as an unincorporated community under the name North Princeton in the 1950 U.S. census. The name was changed to Princeton North in the 1960 U.S. census. It was listed as a census designated place in the 1980 U.S. census. The CDP was deleted prior to the 2010 U.S. census.

As of the 2000 United States census there were 4,528 people, 1,778 households, and 1,264 families residing in the CDP. The population density was 1,079.2 people/km^{2} (2,795 people/mi^{2}). There were 1,831 housing units at an average density of 436.4 units/km^{2} (1,130 units/mi^{2}). The racial makeup of the CDP was 81.56% White, 5.72% African American, 0.27% Native American, 5.94% Asian, 0.07% Pacific Islander, 4.44% from other races, and 2.01% from two or more races. Hispanic or Latino of any race were 8.39% of the population.

There were 1,778 households, out of which 31.4% had children under the age of 18 living with them, 60.9% were married couples living together, 8.1% had a female householder with no husband present, and 28.9% were non-families. 23.7% of all households were made up of individuals, and 10.9% had someone living alone who was 65 years of age or older. The average household size was 2.55 and the average family size was 2.96.

In the CDP the population was spread out, with 23.1% under the age of 18, 4.9% from 18 to 24, 23.7% from 25 to 44, 28.7% from 45 to 64, and 19.7% who were 65 years of age or older. The median age was 44 years. For every 100 females, there were 91.9 males. For every 100 females age 18 and over, there were 88.1 males.

The median income for a household in the CDP was $92,725, and the median income for a family was $109,118. Males had a median income of $69,063 versus $40,179 for females. The per capita income for the CDP was $43,903. About 3.4% of families and 6.0% of the population were below the poverty line, including 8.9% of those under age 18 and none of those age 65 or over.
