= Princeton Battlefield =

- Princeton Battlefield Historic District
- U.S. National Register of Historic Places
- U.S. National Historic Landmark District
- New Jersey Register of Historic Places
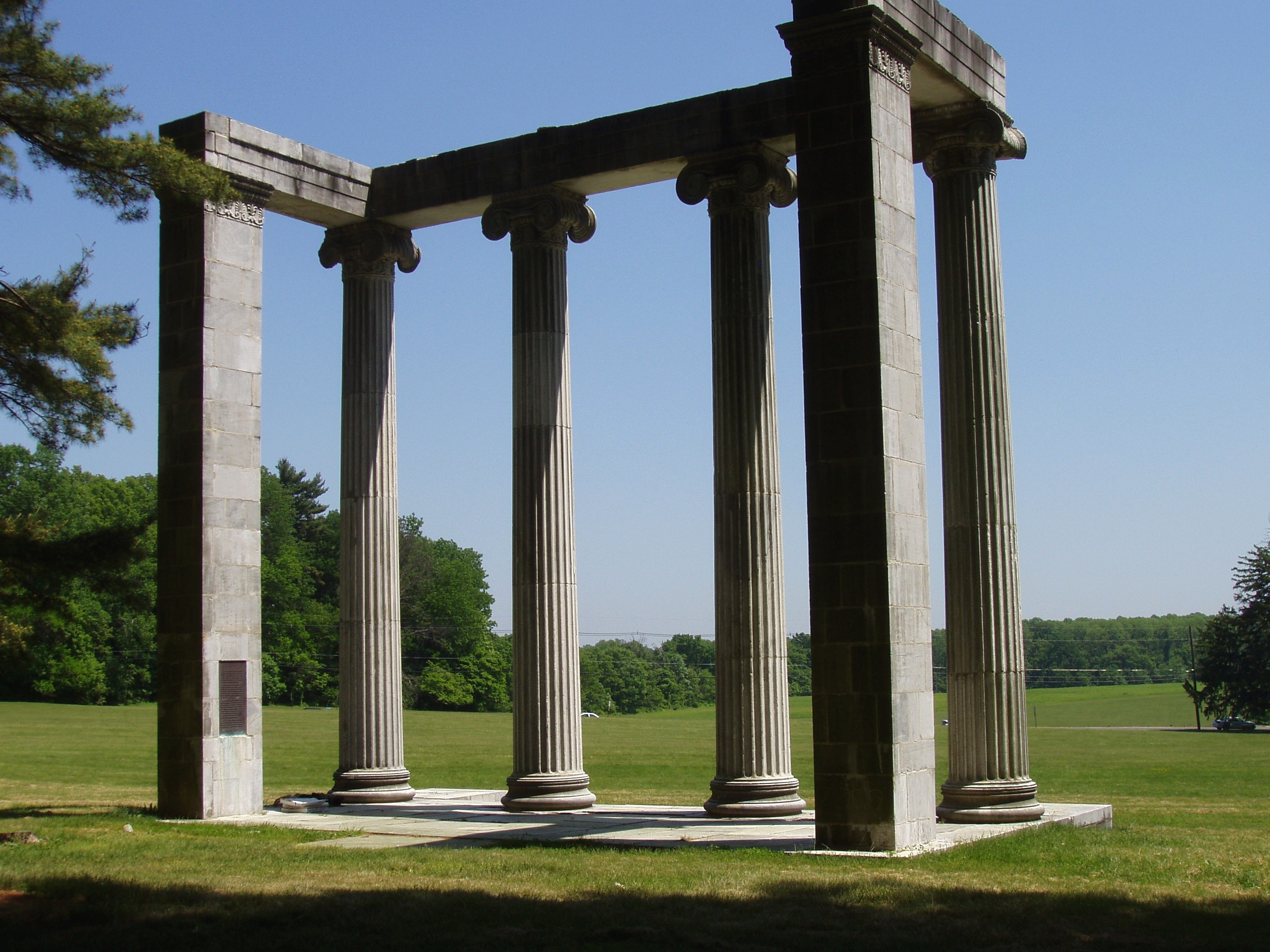

- Location within Mercer County, New Jersey Location within New Jersey Location within the United States
- Location: Mercer County, New Jersey
- Nearest city: Princeton
- Coordinates: 40°19′51″N 74°40′32″W
- Area: 681 acres (276 ha)
- Website: NJDEP
- NRHP reference No.: 66000466 (original); 89000761 (increase 1); 100003698 (increase 2)
- NJRHP No.: 1751, 1752, 1753

Significant dates
- Added to NRHP: October 15, 1966
- Boundary increases: October 10, 1989; April 26, 2019
- Designated NHLD: January 20, 1961
- Designated NJRHP: May 27, 1971; May 12, 1972; April 10, 1989

The Princeton Battlefield in Princeton, Mercer County, New Jersey, United States, is where American and British troops fought each other on January 3, 1777, in the Battle of Princeton during the American Revolutionary War. The battle ended when the British soldiers in Nassau Hall surrendered. This success, following those at the Battle of Trenton on December 26, 1776, and the Battle of the Assunpink Creek the day before, helped improve American morale.

== Princeton Battlefield State Park ==
Princeton Battlefield State Park is a 681-acre (2.8 km^{2}) state park located in Princeton. The park preserves part of the site of the Battle of Princeton (January 3, 1777), which was a victory for General George Washington's revolutionary forces over British forces. The park is maintained by the New Jersey Division of Parks and Forestry, and is located on Mercer Road (Princeton Pike), about 1.5 miles south of Princeton University and 3.8 miles north of Interstate 295/95. The park was established in 1946 on approximately 40 acres (0.16 km^{2}).

Highlights of the park include the Princeton Battlefield site; the Clarke House Museum; the site of the Mercer Oak, a tree which stood in the middle of the battlefield until recent years; the Ionic Colonnade designed by Thomas U. Walter (fourth Architect of the U.S. Capitol); and a stone patio marking the grave of 21 British and 15 American soldiers killed in the battle. A poem was written for the site by Alfred Noyes, Poet Laureate of England.

The park's hiking trails lead to the Delaware and Raritan Canal and to the 588-acre (2 km^{2}) adjacent property of the Institute for Advanced Study.

The Princeton Battle Monument is located in town near Princeton University on non-adjacent park property at Stockton Street and Bayard Lane.

=== Clarke House Museum ===
The Thomas Clarke House Museum was built in 1772 by the third generation of Quakers at Stony Brook. The house is furnished in the Revolutionary period and contains military artifacts and battle exhibits, as well as a research library.

During the battle Hugh Mercer was brought to the Clarke House and treated unsuccessfully by Benjamin Rush.

== Threatened development ==
Part of the battlefield is now a state park, while other portions remain under threat of development. For several years, the Institute for Advanced Study has been attempting to build faculty housing on the portion of Princeton Battlefield known as Maxwell's field. The Princeton Battlefield Society is protesting the project in court, and national and local preservation organizations are working to prevent construction on the property. The American Battlefield Trust, based in Washington, D.C., has reached agreement with the institute to purchase almost 15 acres of the land for $4.5 million, more than $1 million above the site's appraised value. The Trust and its partners had already acquired and preserved 9 acres (0.036 km^{2}) of the battlefield. On May 30, 2018, the Trust announced that it had finalized the purchase after raising almost $3.2 million from private donors, which was matched by an $837,000 grant from the National Park Service and the Mercer County Open Space Assistance Program. The completed purchase ended the long dispute over how and whether the battlefield land would be developed.

== Princeton Battlefield / Stony Brook Village Historic District ==
In 1989 the National Register of Historic Places designation of the Battlefield was expanded to form the Princeton Battlefield / Stony Brook Village Historic District. Princeton's original settlers were Quaker farmers along the Stony Brook immediately to the south and west of the battlefield. The Stony Brook Meeting House and Cemetery was well established at the time of the revolution and in full sight of the battle. The meetinghouse and associated farms are part of the contiguous preserved area that includes the battlefield.

== Features and Interpretation ==
=== Clarke House ===
The Clarke House, built in 1772, not only served as a field hospital after the battle but also reflected the farmstead life of the 18th century. According to the New Jersey State Park Service, the Clarke family enslaved a Black woman named Susannah who lived and worked on the property. The farm complex also included a carriage barn and a smokehouse, while much of the original flooring, windows, and moldings remain preserved within the house today.

=== Colonnade and Common Grave ===
The Ionic colonnade near the Clarke House was originally the facade of a Philadelphia residence designed by Thomas U. Walter in 1836. It was relocated to Princeton and reerected in 1959 to mark the entrance to the common grave of soldiers who died during the battle. A poem by Alfred Noyes, written in 1916, is inlaid in bronze above the grave site.

== Gallery ==
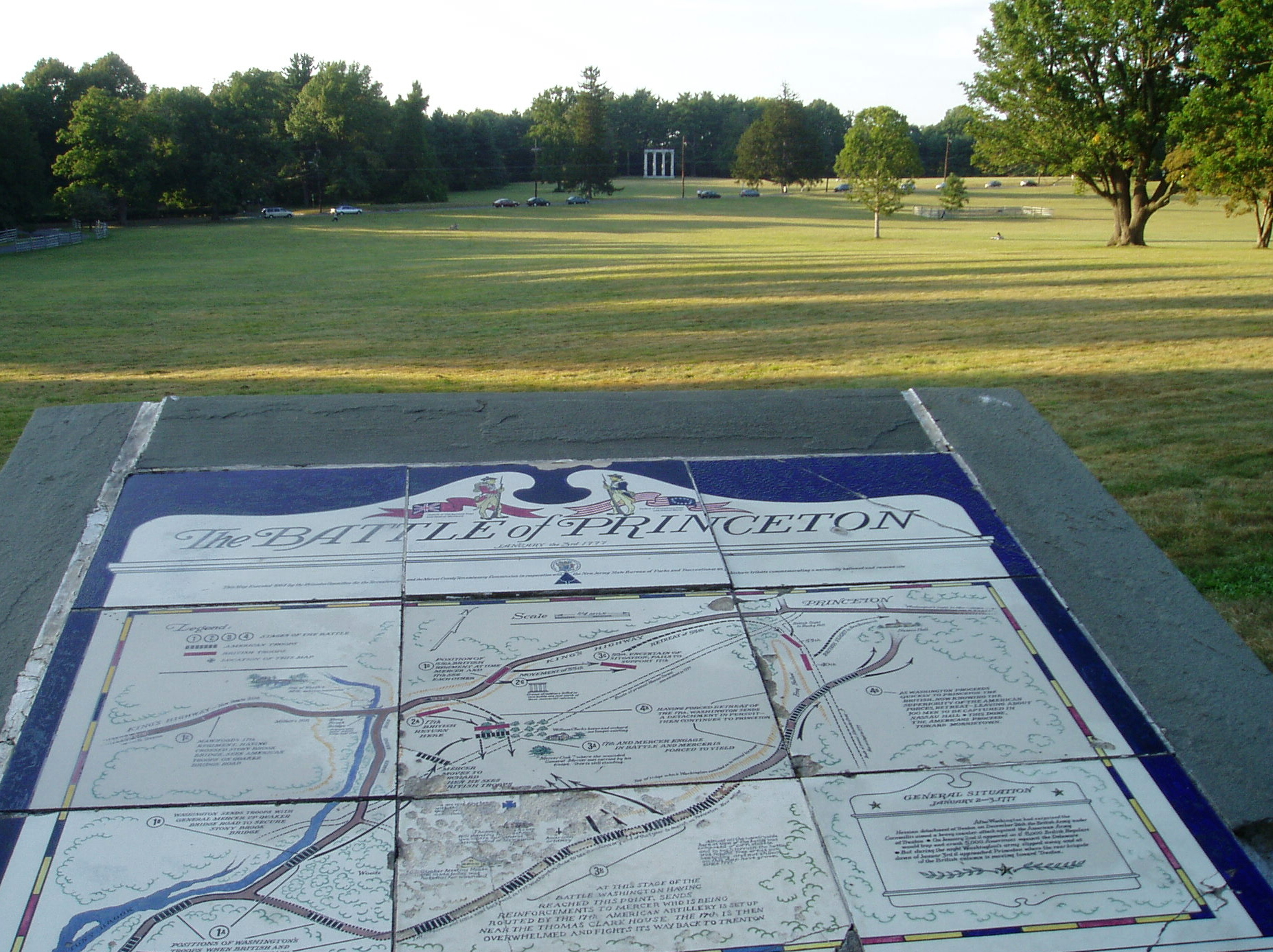
The Princeton battlefield with its map

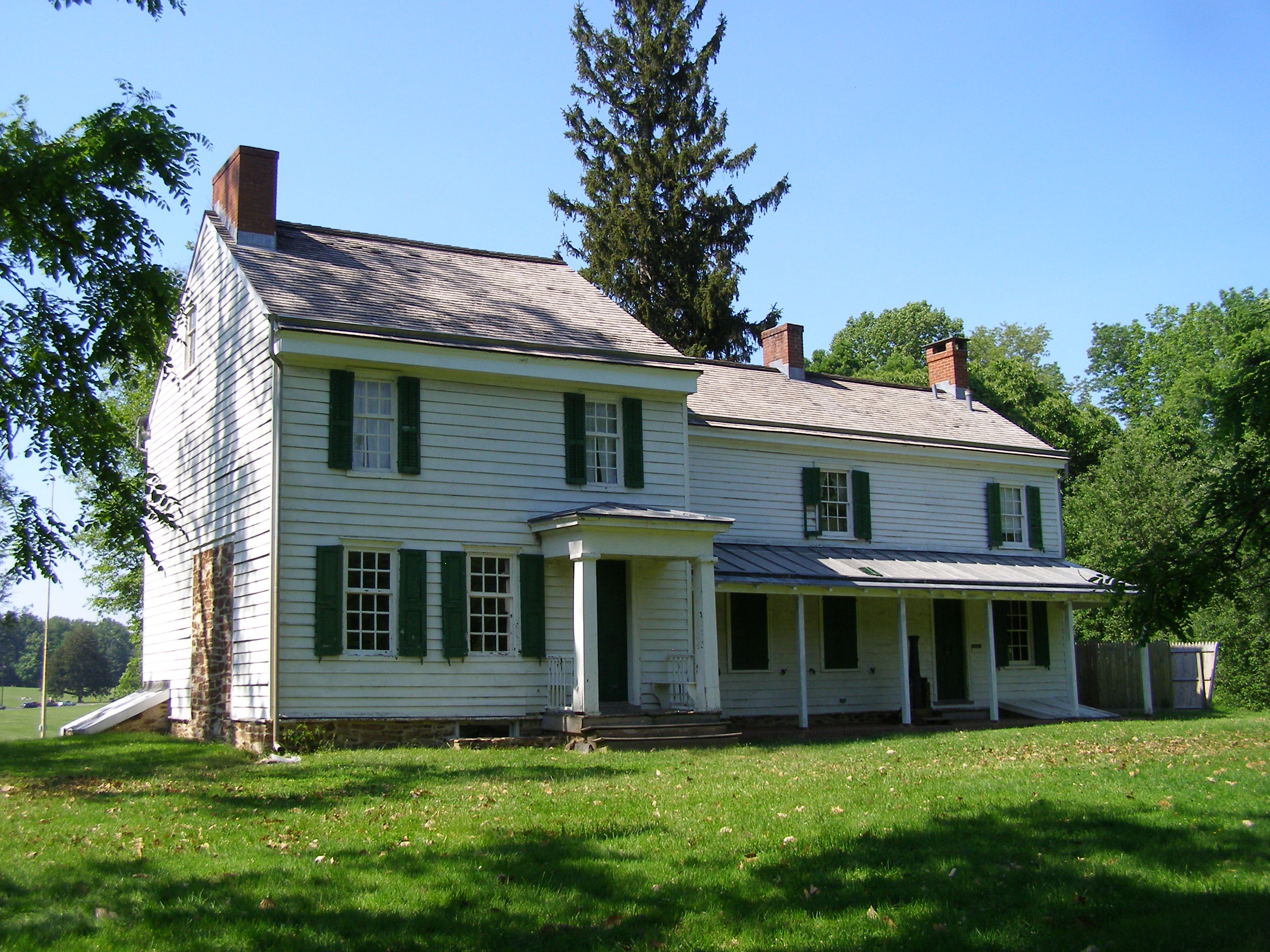
The Clarke House

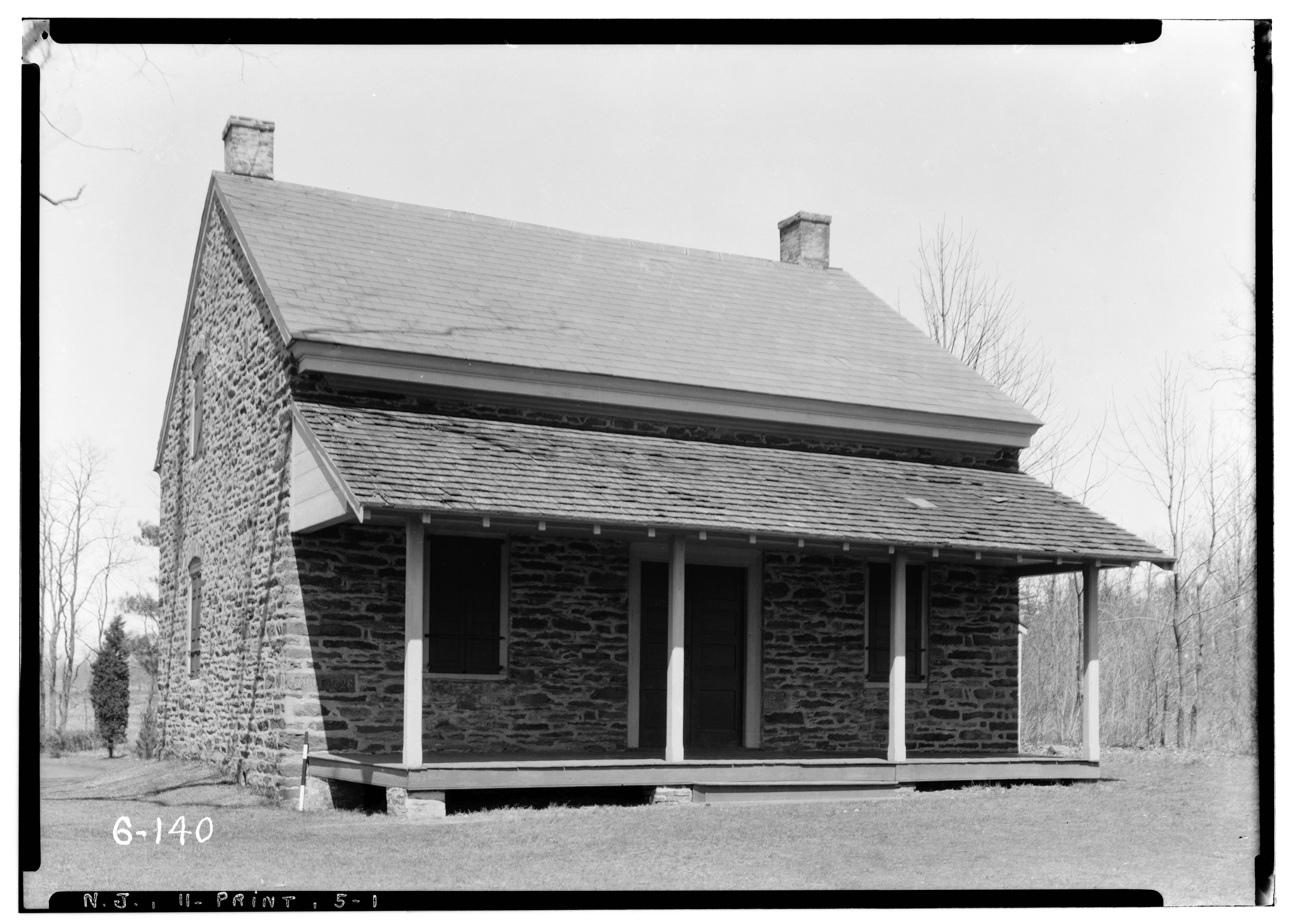
The Stony Brook meetinghouse in 1936 from the Historic American Buildings Survey

== See also ==
- National Register of Historic Places listings in Mercer County, New Jersey
