= Virginia–Virginia Tech rivalry =

American college sports rivalry

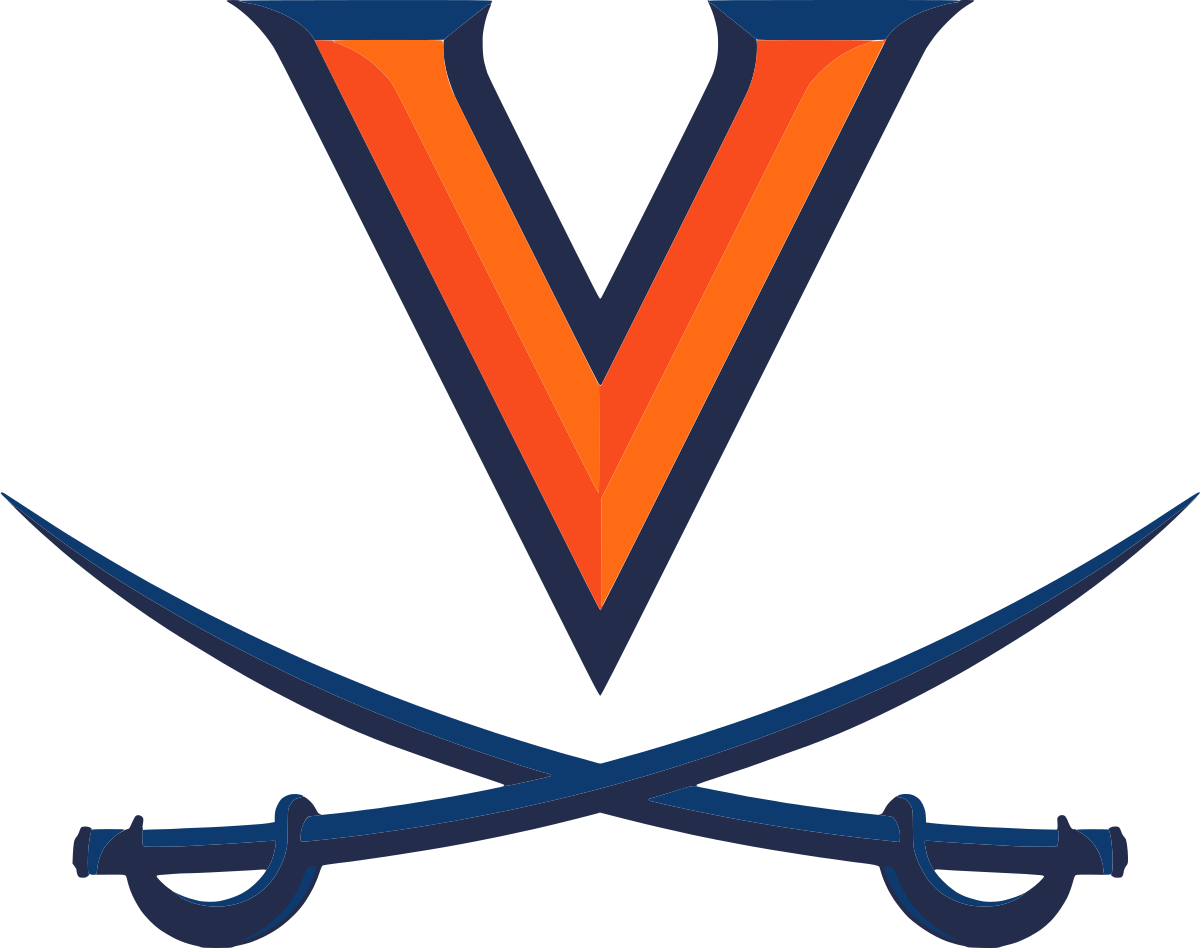
- Virginia Cavaliers Virginia Tech Hokies
- Location: Virginia

The Virginia–Virginia Tech rivalry is an American college rivalry that exists between the Virginia Cavaliers sports teams of the University of Virginia (called Virginia in sports media and abbreviated UVA) and the Virginia Tech Hokies sports teams of Virginia Polytechnic Institute and State University (called Virginia Tech and abbreviated VT). Both athletics programs are members of the Atlantic Coast Conference. In sports that have divisional play, such as college baseball and college football, they both compete in the Coastal division of the conference. Despite different or no conference affiliations from 1937 to 2004, Virginia and Virginia Tech always maintained athletic ties and were annual rivals in many sports.

From 2005 to 2007 and again since 2014, the Cavaliers and Hokies have participated in a program-wide rivalry contest (Commonwealth Clash) for an annual trophy, with points awarded to the winner of each matchup in each common sport.

== All-time and ACC series results ==
Sport	All-time series record	ACC series record	Last result	Next meeting
Baseball	UVA leads 115–94	UVA leads 42–19	VT won 6–3 on March 15, 2026	Spring 2027
Men's Basketball (Rivalry)	UVA leads 100–62	UVA leads 27–17	UVA won 76–72 on March 7, 2026	Winter 2027
Women's Basketball	UVA leads 53–20	UVA leads 28–14	VT won 83–82 on March 1, 2026	Winter 2027
Football (Rivalry)	VT leads 62–39–5	VT leads 19–2	UVA won 27–7 on November 29, 2025	Fall 2026
Women's Lacrosse	UVA leads 29–3	UVA leads 19–3	UVA won 13–10 on April 16, 2026	Spring 2027
Men's Soccer	UVA leads 44–6–7	UVA leads 13–6–7	Tied 2–2 on September 5, 2025	Fall 2026
Women's Soccer	UVA leads 21–4–2	UVA leads 14–3–1	UVA won 2–1 on October 4, 2025	Fall 2026
Softball	VT leads 54–26	VT leads 45–16	VT won 3-1 on May 7, 2026	Spring 2027
Men's Swimming/Diving	UVA leads 29–10	UVA leads 11–10	VT won 157-104 on January 17, 2026	Winter 2027
Women's Swimming/Diving	UVA leads 37–1	UVA leads 21–0	UVA won 201-87 on January 17, 2026	Winter 2027
Men's Tennis	UVA leads 62–9	UVA leads 20–1	UVA won 4-0 on April 9, 2026	Spring 2027
Women's Tennis	UVA leads 45–5	UVA leads 21–0	UVA won 7–0 on February 18, 2027	Spring 2027
Volleyball	UVA leads 45–40	UVA leads 22–20	UVA won 3–0 on November 19, 2025	Fall 2026
Wrestling	VT leads 50–27	VT leads 19–3	VT won 32-7 on February 6, 2026	Winter 2027
TOTALS	UVA leads 618–392–14	UVA leads 240–165–8		

Series led and games won by Virginia are shaded ██. Series led and games won by Virginia Tech shaded ██. Head-to-head games/matches only

== Conference, Sponsorship, Relative Popularity and Success ==
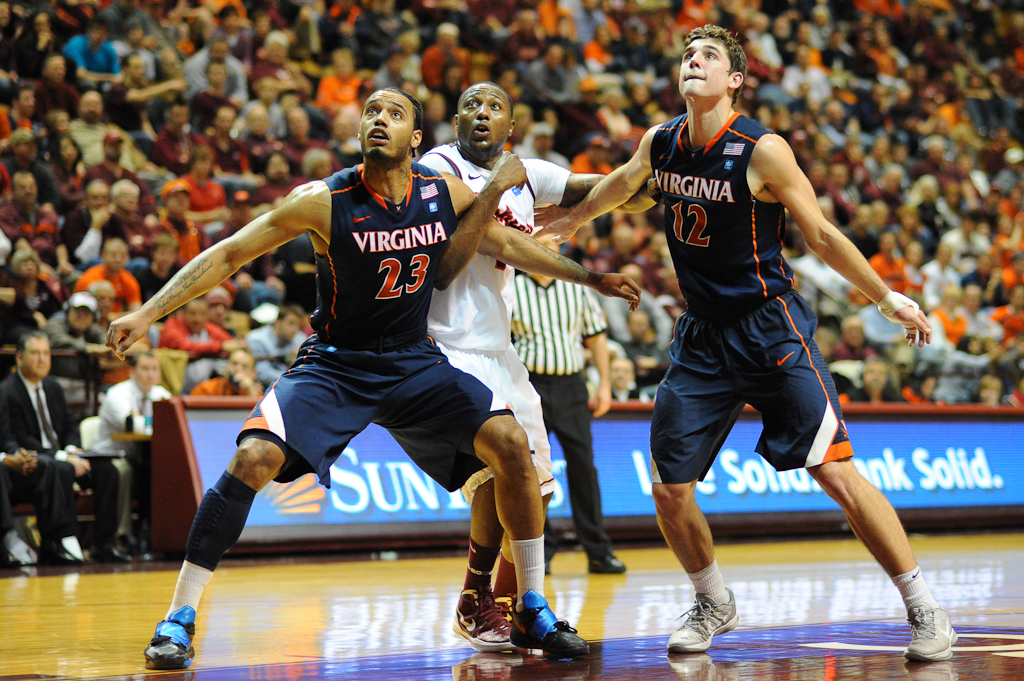
Mike Scott and Joe Harris of the Cavaliers battle Cadarian Raines of the Hokies for a rebound at Cassell Coliseum

UVA has been a member of the ACC since 1953, while Virginia Tech was invited in 2004. Both athletics programs are also sponsored by Nike. The Cavaliers are signed with Nike through 2025, at $3.5 million per year. The Hokies are also signed with Nike through 2022, at $1.98 million per year. Virginia had the third-highest ACC total athletics revenue, with $91 million, in 2014–2015. Virginia Tech was sixth out of the 15 programs, drawing $80 million.

UVA polled as the most popular college sports program in their home state as of 2015 — with Virginians choosing the Cavaliers over the Hokies by a six-point margin of 34% to 28% — despite UVA having fewer students and a smaller alumni base than Virginia Tech. The first and only Fan Vote of the Commonwealth Clash, also in 2015, bore out that result as there were more Cavalier votes than Hokie votes in the final tally which allowed UVA to take the point. The overall Virginia Cavaliers program polled more popular than all NFL and MLB teams (NBA teams were not polled) while only the former Washington Redskins tied the overall Virginia Tech program at 28% support.

The Cavaliers have twice won the prestigious Capital One Cup for fielding the top overall men's athletics program in the nation, in 2015 and 2019, and UVA places first in the ACC for all-time Men's NCAA Championships with 20. Virginia is in second place in the conference for NCAA Championships in women's sports with 10. UVA's recent NCAA Championships include winning the 2019 NCAA tournament championship in men's basketball, winning the 2015 College World Series in baseball, and winning the 2014 College Cup in men's soccer. On the other side of the rivalry, Virginia Tech is one of two ACC programs (the other is Pittsburgh) to have not yet earned its first NCAA Championship in a team sport.

Virginia fields more overall teams than Virginia Tech. As a result, certain highly successful UVA teams like the eight-time NCAA Champion Virginia Cavaliers men's lacrosse team and two-time NCAA Champion Virginia women's rowing team do not compete against Virginia Tech and so do not consider the Hokies their rivals. Virginia Tech briefly sponsored men's lacrosse before folding the program after the 1986 season; Virginia leads the all-time series in men's lacrosse 10-0.

== Commonwealth Challenge and Clash ==
Commonwealth Challenge and Clash
Virginia (9)	Virginia Tech (3)
2005–06; 2006–07; 2014–15; 2015–16; 2018–19; 2022–23; 2023–24; 2024–25; 2025–26	2016–17; 2017–18; 2021–22

Newly in the same conference, the two schools agreed to face off in the Commonwealth Challenge across all sports in 2005. The Challenge continued through 2007, with the Cavaliers winning both years of the competition. Future sponsorship was not sought out of respect for the Virginia Tech massacre. Virginia athletic director Craig Littlepage stated at the time that "now is not the time to be talking about bragging rights."

In August 2014, the two schools announced a renewed rivalry competition with a new name and new scoring system between the two schools, named the Commonwealth Clash. This more recent competition was sponsored by Virginia 529 College Savings Plan. At the end of the 2018–19 academic year, UVA led the Clash series 3–2 and total points 60–47. This was then declared the final year of the original Clash on its official website.

Each meeting or yearly series in a sport is worth a single point in the Clash. In basketball and volleyball, where the two schools meet twice per season, each individual game is worth one-half point. In baseball and softball, the point is awarded to the winner of the series, with a split of a two-game series earning one-half point each. A tied game in soccer also awards one-half point each. In sports where teams participate in meets or tournaments instead of head-to-head – cross country, indoor and outdoor track and field, and men's and women's golf – the school that finishes higher in the ACC championship earns the point. Swimming and diving also falls under this category, even though the two schools schedule an annual meet against each other; this meeting does not count toward the Clash.

There are 22 points, requiring 11½ to clinch the Clash. If there is a tie, the first tiebreaker is the greater number of ACC championships in common sports, followed by the greater number of honor roll athletes in common sports. The tiebreakers have been invoked only once, in 2016–17; Virginia Tech won the tiebreaker in that Clash by capturing four ACC championships to Virginia's one.

The 2019–20 Clash trophy was not awarded due to the COVID-19 pandemic. At the time competition was suspended, Virginia led 7 1/2–6 1/2, with eight points remaining to be contested and nearly all of them in sports which had often favored Virginia in the previous years of the Clash.

The Clash made its return after a three-year absence for the 2021–22 academic year, with Smithfield Foods taking over sponsorship duties. After winning the baseball series, 2–1, the Hokies would clinch the Clash for the year, eventually winning, 12 1/2–8 1/2.

In 2022–23, the Cavaliers took home the Clash after posting a better finish than Tech at the ACC Championships in men's golf, eventually winning, 12–9. The Cavaliers clinched the trophy in the same fashion in 2023–24, while their women's golf team scored the clinching point in 2024–25.

=== Yearly records ===
==== Commonwealth Clash ====
Yearly Result; Overall Clash series	UVA 15–7; UVA led 3–0	UVA 14–7; UVA led 4–0	Tied 11–11 (VT wins tiebreaker); UVA led 4–1	VT 12½–8½; UVA led 4–2	UVA 12½–9½; UVA led 5–2	UVA 7 1/2–6 1/2 (Not Completed (Note: Due to the COVID-19 pandemic, the NCAA canceled all remaining winter and spring championships for the 2019-20 academic year on March 12, 2020. This was followed by the ACC canceling all of its unplayed competition on March 17. Although UVa led 7 1/2–6 1/2 at this time, no Clash trophy was awarded.)); Not counted	VT 12½–8½; UVA led 5–3	UVA 12–9; UVA led 6–3	UVA 15–7; UVA led 7–3	UVA 15–7; UVA led 8–3	UVA 16–6; UVA leads 9–3	VT 3½–1½ (In Progress); UVA leads 9–3
Sport	2014–15	2015–16	2016–17	2017–18	2018–19	2019–20	2021–22	2022–23	2023-24	2024-25	2025-26	2026-27
Men's Soccer	UVA	UVA	Halved	UVA	Halved	UVA	VT	UVA	UVA	UVA	Halved	VT
Women's Soccer	UVA	Did Not Play	UVA	Did Not Play	VT	UVA	Did Not Play	Halved	UVA	UVA	UVA	UVA
Men's Cross Country	UVA	UVA	UVA	VT	UVA	VT	UVA	UVA	UVA	UVA	UVA	VT
Women's Cross Country	UVA	UVA	VT	VT	VT	VT	VT	UVA	UVA	UVA	UVA	VT
Volleyball	Halved	Halved	VT	VT	Halved	UVA	VT	UVA	UVA	UVA	UVA	Halved
Football	VT	VT	VT	VT	VT	UVA	VT	Not Played (Note: The 2022 edition of the Commonwealth Cup was cancelled due to the 2022 University of Virginia shooting, which took the lives of three Virginia players.)	VT	VT	UVA	Not Yet Played
Men's Basketball	UVA	Halved	Halved	Halved	UVA	UVA	Halved	Halved	Halved	Halved	Halved	Not Yet Played
Women's Basketball	UVA	VT	UVA	UVA	Halved	Halved	VT	VT	Halved	Halved	VT	Not Yet Played
Wrestling	VT	VT	VT	VT	VT	VT	VT	VT	VT	VT	VT	Not Yet Played
Men's Swimming/Diving	VT	VT	VT	UVA	UVA	UVA	VT	VT	VT	VT	VT	Not Yet Played
Women's Swimming/Diving	UVA	UVA	UVA	UVA	UVA	UVA	UVA	UVA	UVA	UVA	UVA	Not Yet Played
Men's Indoor Track and Field	VT	UVA	VT	VT	VT	VT	VT	VT	VT	VT	UVA	Not Yet Played
Women's Indoor Track and Field	VT	UVA	VT	VT	VT	VT	VT	VT	VT	UVA	UVA	Not Yet Played
Men's Tennis	UVA	UVA	UVA	VT	UVA	Not Played due to COVID-19	UVA	UVA	UVA	UVA	UVA	Not Yet Played
Women's Tennis	UVA	UVA	UVA	UVA	UVA	Not Played due to COVID-19	UVA	UVA	UVA	UVA	UVA	Not Yet Played
Men's Golf	UVA	UVA	UVA	UVA	UVA	Not Played due to COVID-19	UVA	UVA	UVA	UVA	UVA	Not Yet Played
Women's Golf	Did Not Play	UVA	UVA	UVA	UVA	Not Played due to COVID-19	UVA	UVA	UVA	UVA	VT	Not Yet Played
Women's Lacrosse	UVA	UVA	UVA	VT	UVA	Not Played due to COVID-19	UVA	UVA	UVA	UVA	UVA	Not Yet Played
Baseball	VT	UVA	UVA	UVA	UVA	Not Played due to COVID-19	VT	VT	UVA	UVA	UVA	Not Yet Played
Softball	Halved	VT	VT	VT	VT	VT	VT	VT	VT	VT	VT	Not Yet Played
Men's Outdoor Track and Field	UVA	VT	VT	VT	VT	Not Played due to COVID-19	VT	UVA	UVA	VT	UVA	Not Yet Played
Women's Outdoor Track and Field	UVA	UVA	VT	VT	UVA	Not Played due to COVID-19	UVA	VT	UVA	UVA	UVA	Not Yet Played
Fan Vote point	UVA	No Vote Held										

== Intensity and Pranks ==
Some from outside the state find the rivalry to be an especially bitter one. Former Ohio State quarterback and football analyst Kirk Herbstreit said in 2004 that he "never realized how much those people hate each other." He went on to say "when I was down in Blacksburg, I said some nice things about Al Groh and it was like I had turned my back on them."

In 2011, students from Virginia Tech put a tee shirt from their school on a statue of Thomas Jefferson located on The Lawn, after Virginia Tech's football team won the yearly matchup.

== History ==
=== Virginia Tech joins ACC ===
In 2003, the Atlantic Coast Conference initially planned to add Boston College, Miami, and Syracuse to the conference lineup. Talks with Syracuse stalled as Jim Boeheim vocalized his opposition to the move, and Duke, UNC, and Virginia consistently voted against adding the Orange. When it became obvious that Syracuse lacked the necessary seven votes, Virginia Tech emerged as a compromise candidate put forward to win over the decisive seventh vote from the University of Virginia that ACC officials needed to gain approval for their expansion plans.

Virginia Governor Mark Warner earlier had suggested the NCAA intervene and mediate the expansion process, and when that failed added pressure to UVA President John T. Casteen III to refrain from casting an affirmative vote for the conference's plan to expand without Virginia Tech. Warner feared that such a move would hurt Virginia Tech by leaving it in a diminished Big East. Casteen then offered a plan to have the ACC expand but consider Virginia Tech in lieu of Syracuse on June 18, 2003. Duke and UNC voted against the Hokies, but with Casteen's support Virginia Tech was invited to the conference with 7 out of 9 votes. Miami and Virginia Tech joined the ACC in 2004, with Boston College joining in 2005.

The primary significance of this development to the rivalry was that the athletic teams from the two schools would now be mandated to play every year. For instance, the men's college soccer teams did not face each other in any of the four seasons between 2000 and 2003. They have since met every year after Virginia Tech became a conference member in 2004. Additionally, in some sports where there was already an agreement to play each other on an annual basis, the teams might now play more than once. For instance, the men's college basketball teams had played each other annually since the 1934–35 season but not faced each other twice in the same season since 1983–84. Starting with the 2004–05 season, the teams have played at least twice each year, and in 2005–06 the teams met for a third time in the ACC tournament.

=== Impact of the Virginia Tech massacre ===
In addition to ending the original Commonwealth Challenge, the Virginia Tech massacre had the effect of lessening of hostilities between the two universities during the aftermath. According to The Washington Post "students in both camps are more apt to think of themselves as simply Virginians." UVa students were among the first to lend support to the Virginia Tech community in the wake of the shootings. Likewise, the connections between the two university's populations are often very close. Prior to the 2007 football contest in Charlottesville both college's bands participated in a joint performance.

...there was the sense among Tech students that fans of U-Va. – an institution founded by none other than Thomas Jefferson – looked down their noses at the mountain-ensconced Hokies of Blacksburg. Hokies were "hicks"; Cavaliers were "snobs." But after the shootings in April, something changed. U-Va. students and faculty members wrote condolence letters, held a candlelight vigil and even painted the campus's fabled Beta Bridge with a pro-Hokies phrase.

— Jonathan Mummolo, The Washington Post

UVa.'s student newspaper reported that students in Charlottesville were even sporting Hokie sweatshirts on occasion in observance of the tragedy. The University's Z Society went so far as unveiling a 65' x 120' Virginia Pride flag featuring both UVA and VT logos on it during the annual football game, and it was noted that the two fan bases had never been so close as they were after the shootings.

Since the tragedy, it hasn't been so odd to see a Wahoo wearing a Virginia Tech sweatshirt. Since April, transfer students haven't felt so awkward saying they used to attend school in Blacksburg. Truly, Hokies and Wahoos have never been so together.

— Eric Kolenich, The Cavalier Daily

=== Impact of the 2022 UVA shooting ===
Much like the sportsmanship and support shown in the wake of the Virginia Tech massacre, several condolences and tributes were provided by Virginia Tech and other Virginia universities in the wake of the 2022 University of Virginia shooting, in which three students were killed and two others were injured. All three killed and one of the wounded were members of the UVA football team. Virginia would end up canceling the remaining two games on its schedule, including the finale at Virginia Tech.

The following Saturday, November 19, Virginia Tech and Liberty Flames football players wore orange and navy blue jerseys to match U-Va.'s colors prior to their matchup. Virginia Tech receivers coach Fontel Mines, a former Virginia receiver, raised the school's flag as the Hokies entered the field ahead of the game, and Liberty's band performed Virginia's "The Good Old Song" following a first-quarter touchdown.

In Week 11 of the 2022 NFL season, several Washington Commanders players and coaches were seen wearing Virginia Cavaliers apparel prior to their game against the Houston Texans, including tight end Logan Thomas, a former Virginia Tech quarterback.

== See also ==
- Virginia–Virginia Tech football rivalry
- Virginia–Virginia Tech men's basketball rivalry
