= Virginia–Virginia Tech men's basketball rivalry =

American college basketball rivalry

UVA–VT men's basketball rivalry
- Virginia Cavaliers Virginia Tech Hokies
- Other names: Commonwealth Clash
- Sport: College basketball
- Location: Virginia, United States
- First meeting: February 20, 1915; Virginia, 39–21
- Latest meeting: March 7, 2026; Virginia, 76–72
- Stadiums: John Paul Jones Arena (14,593); Cassell Coliseum (8,925)

Statistics
- Total meetings: 162
- All-time record: Virginia leads, 100–62
- All-time series (Conference only): Virginia leads, 43–20
- Postseason results: Virginia leads 1–0
- Largest victory: Virginia: 48 points (1955); Virginia Tech: 35 points (1961)
- Longest win streak: Both: 9 games VT: 1948–52, 1958–65; UVA: 1978–84
- Current win streak: Virginia, 1 (2026–present)

Locations of the University of Virginia and Virginia Tech. Roughly 119 miles separate the two schools.

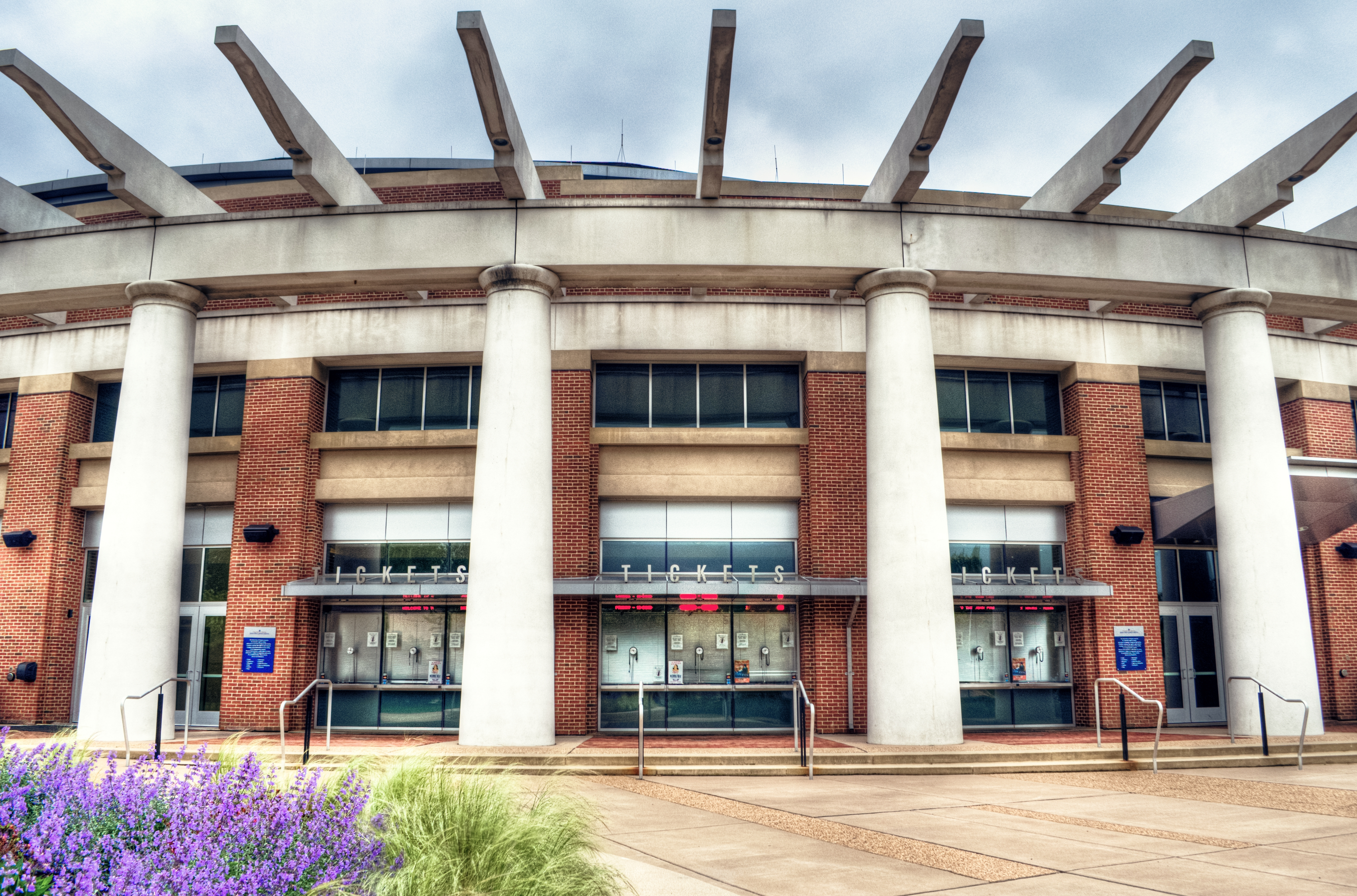
Opened in 2006, John Paul Jones Arena ("JPJ") is the largest indoor arena in Virginia and is home of the Virginia Cavaliers men's and women's teams. It has a capacity of 14,593 for basketball and also serves as an award-winning major concert venue.

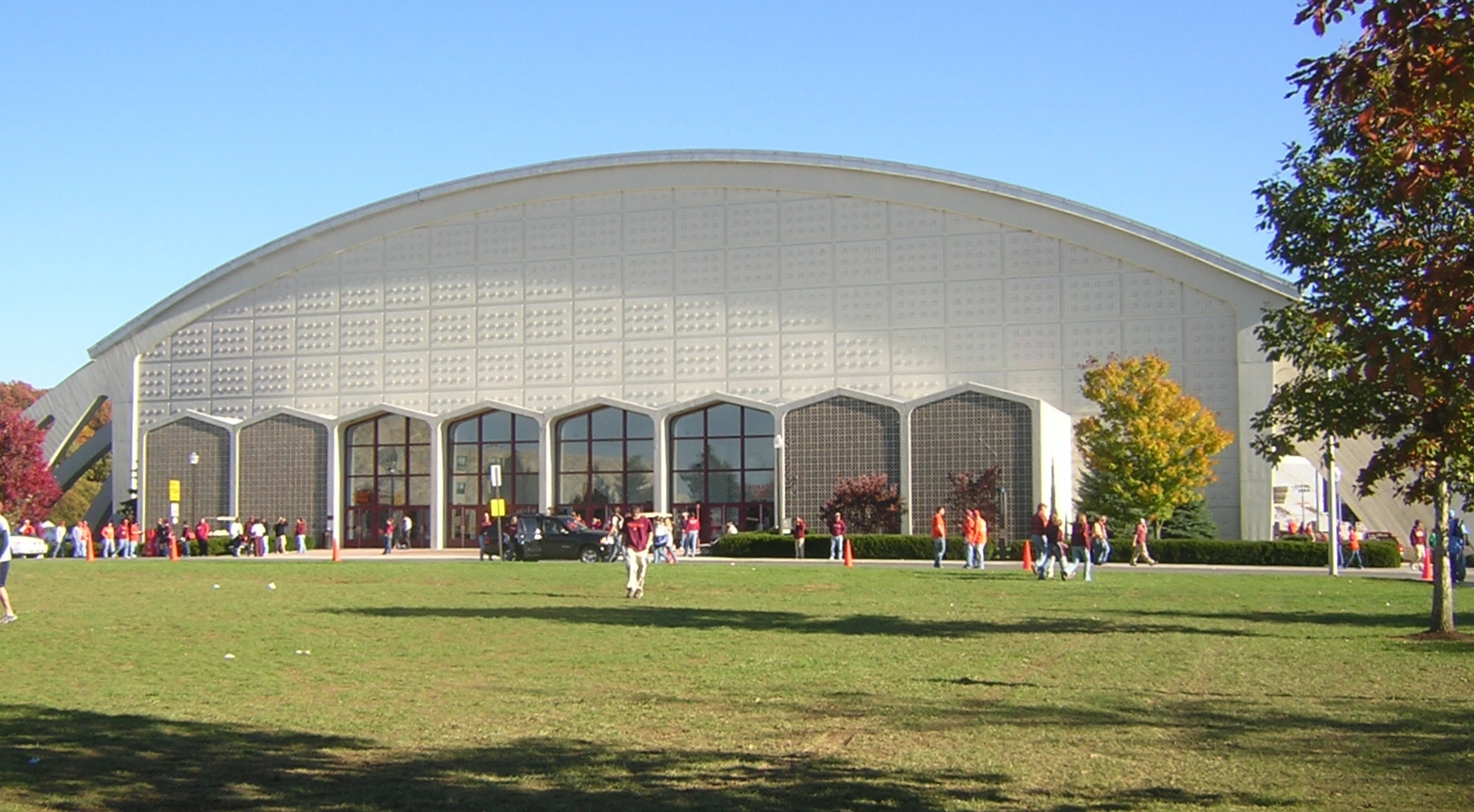
Opened in 1962, Cassell Coliseum is the home of the Virginia Tech Hokies men's and women's basketball teams. It has a capacity of 8,925.

The Virginia–Virginia Tech men's basketball rivalry is an American College basketball rivalry between the men's basketball team of the University of Virginia (called Virginia in sports media and abbreviated UVA) and the men's basketball team of Virginia Polytechnic Institute and State University (called Virginia Tech and abbreviated VT). The two schools first met in 1915 and have played in every season since 1922. Since Virginia Tech's admission in the ACC in 2004, the teams have played twice annually.

== History ==
The two teams first played in 1915, with the Cavaliers winning 39–21. The games are normally played on the schools' respective campuses, but, especially between 1976 and 2000, neutral sites throughout Virginia, such as Roanoke, Lynchburg, Richmond, and Norfolk hosted the games. In 2006, the teams had their lone meeting in the ACC men's basketball tournament; Virginia won 60–56 in the first-round match-up.

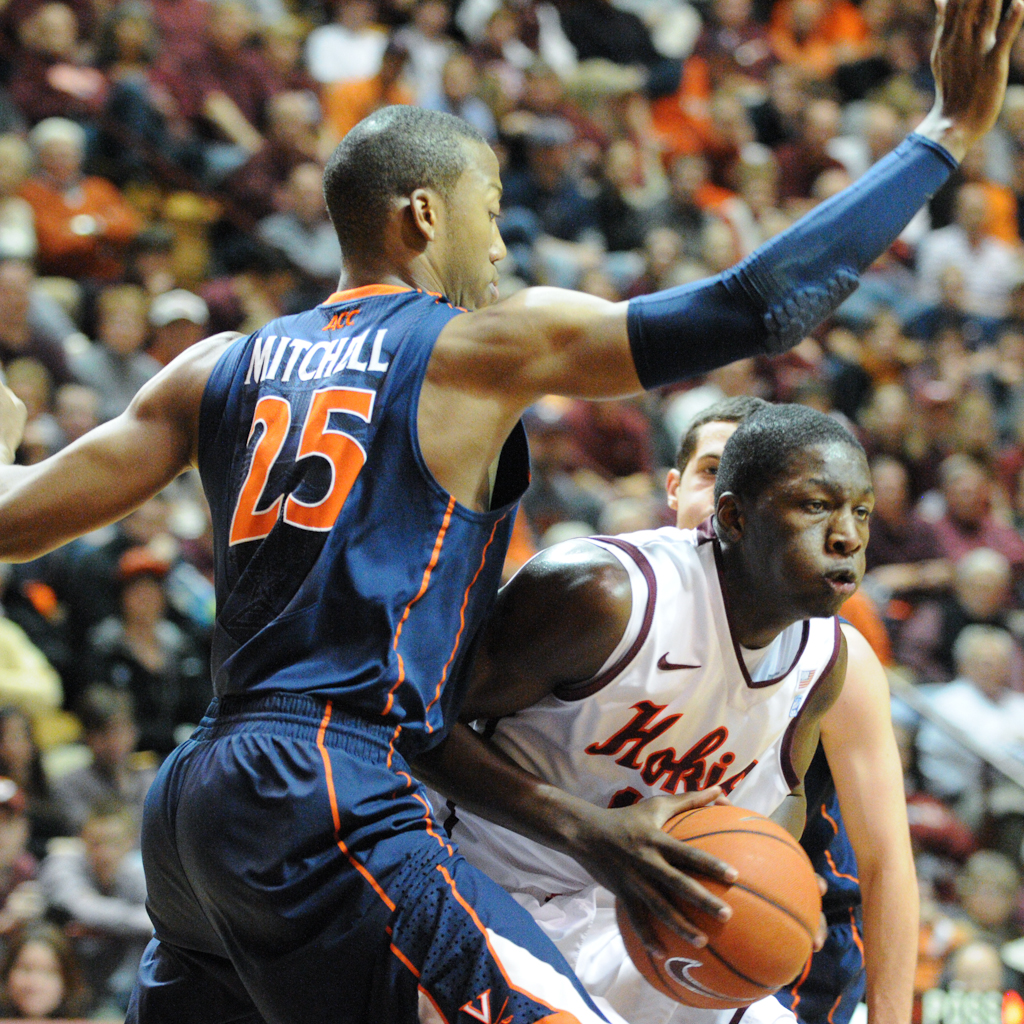
UVA's Akil Mitchell guards Tech's Cadarian Raines in the 2012 Blacksburg game. The Cavaliers won, 74-58.

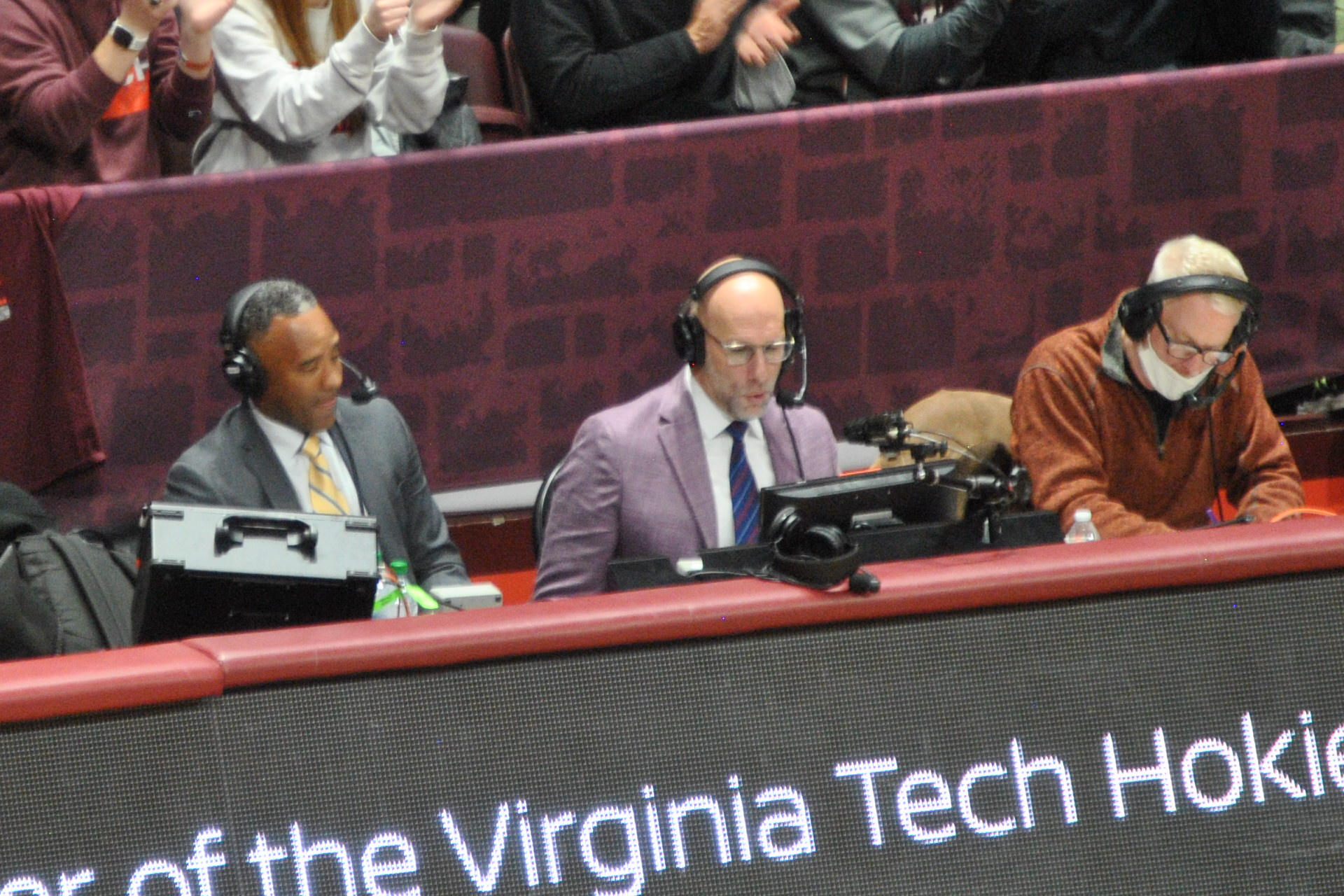
Waynesboro native and former Virginia player, Cory Alexander calls the game with Dan Shulman as ESPN's Big Monday visits Blacksburg for the rivalry in 2022. Tech won the game, 62-53.

=== 2007: ACC championship on the line ===
Virginia and No. 25 Virginia Tech surprisingly sat atop the ACC standings with identical 10–4 ACC records on March 1, 2007, and faced off at John Paul Jones Arena in Charlottesville in a de facto tiebreaker. The winner would clinch a share of either the fifth (of 11) ACC regular season championships for UVA or a first for Virginia Tech. Virginia went on to win the game, and its share of the ACC regular season title, 69–56, with a late 6–0 run by Sean Singletary being key to their championship victory.

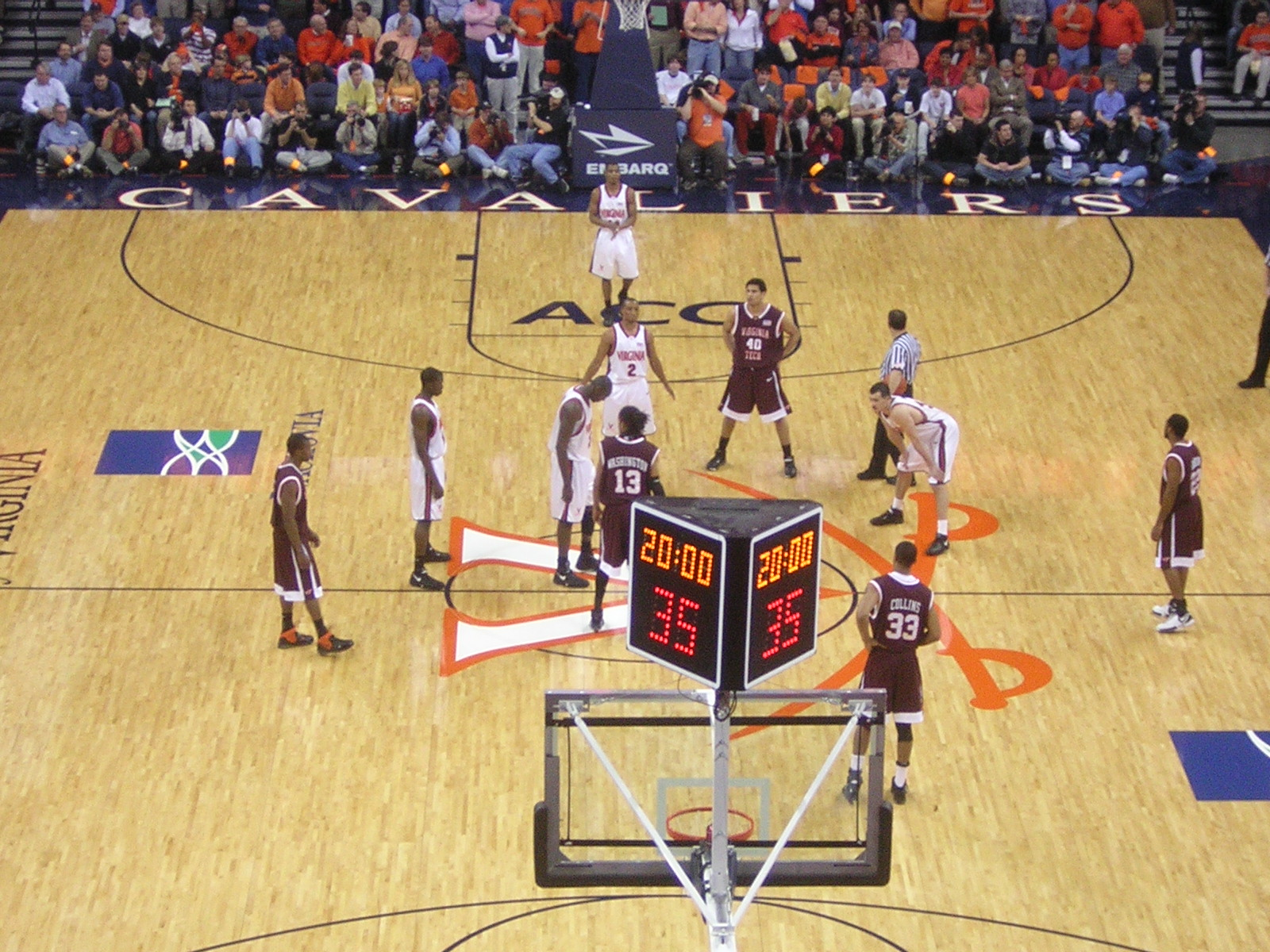
UVA and Tech before tip-off in a game to decide which team would clinch first place in the ACC. The Cavaliers sealed their 5th ACC season title with this 2007 victory.

=== 2017: Stuck on the rim ===
No. 12 Virginia traveled to Blacksburg after besting Virginia Tech by 23 in Charlottesville. With the score tied and approximately 20 seconds remaining in overtime, London Perrantes drove into the lane for a layup and it seemed certain Virginia would take the lead. Shockingly, the ball rolled around the hoop until coming to rest on the back of the rim, and the possession arrow gave the ball to Virginia Tech... who went on to win 80–78 after a second overtime. Hokie Seth Allen hit a short pull-up jumper to seal it.

=== 2019: Top Ten heavyweights ===
Arguably the two best squads in the history of these programs faced off on January 15, 2019, in the first and only meeting between two AP Top 10 teams in the rivalry's history. The No. 4 Cavaliers entered the contest with a record of 15–0 (3–0 ACC) while the No. 9 Hokies came in with a 14–1 (3–0 ACC) record. UVA never trailed from the opening tip to the final buzzer in this heavyweight matchup, winning 81–59 and powered by De'Andre Hunter's 21 points and Ty Jerome's double-double and career-high 12 assists. Nickeil Alexander-Walker led the Hokies with 19 points. The Cavaliers went on to win the NCAA Tournament Championship at the end of the season, defeating another Tech team in the NCAA championship game.

== Wins by location ==
Location	UVA	VT	First	Last
Blacksburg	24	34	1926	Yearly
Charlottesville	44	14	1915	Yearly
Greensboro	1	0	2006	
Hampton	2	0	1970	1977
Lynchburg	3	3	1923	1944
Norfolk	1	0	1985	
Richmond	13	4	1953	2000
Roanoke	12	5	1922	1998
Salem	0	1	1968	

== Game results ==
Rankings are from the AP Poll (1936–present)

Virginia victories	Virginia Tech victories	Tie games

No.	Date	Location	Winner	Score
1	February 20, 1915	Charlottesville	Virginia	39–21
2	February 9, 1916	Charlottesville	Virginia	30–14
3	February 22, 1922	Roanoke	Virginia	26–22
4	February 22, 1923	Lynchburg	Virginia Tech	22–18
5	February 2, 1924	Roanoke	Virginia	32–16
6	January 31, 1925	Charlottesville	Virginia	43–32
7	January 26, 1926	Blacksburg	Virginia	34–19
8	January 22, 1927	Blacksburg	Virginia	34–25
9	February 26, 1927	Blacksburg	Virginia	27–14
10	February 2, 1928	Charlottesville	Virginia	35–26
11	February 9, 1928	Blacksburg	Virginia	38–12
12	January 23, 1929	Blacksburg	Virginia Tech	26–25
13	February 5, 1929	Charlottesville	Virginia	34–25
14	January 24, 1930	Charlottesville	Virginia	28–21
15	January 28, 1930	Blacksburg	Virginia Tech	34–31
16	January 17, 1931	Blacksburg	Virginia Tech	28–21
17	January 30, 1931	Charlottesville	Virginia	35–25
18	January 25, 1932	Blacksburg	Virginia	35–24
19	January 29, 1932	Charlottesville	Virginia	26–22
20	January 27, 1933	Lynchburg	Virginia	36–30
21	January 23, 1935	Charlottesville	Virginia	54–31
22	February 18, 1935	Charlottesville	Virginia	54–31
23	February 14, 1936	Charlottesville	Virginia	30–26
24	February 11, 1937	Lynchburg	Virginia Tech	29–28
25	February 19, 1937	Roanoke	Virginia	40–22
26	February 1, 1938	Charlottesville	Virginia	43–38
27	February 7, 1938	Blacksburg	Virginia Tech	35–32
28	January 30, 1939	Charlottesville	Virginia	45–16
29	February 20, 1939	Blacksburg	Virginia	39–25
30	January 29, 1940	Blacksburg	Virginia	34–25
31	February 21, 1940	Charlottesville	Virginia	42–27
32	January 21, 1941	Lynchburg	Virginia	49–35
33	February 15, 1941	Blacksburg	Virginia	40–39
34	January 23, 1942	Roanoke	Virginia Tech	42–35
35	February 14, 1942	Blacksburg	Virginia	58–36
36	February 6, 1943	Lynchburg	Virginia Tech	62–46
37	January 17, 1944	Lynchburg	Virginia	63–55
38	January 20, 1945	Blacksburg	Virginia	44–34
39	January 19, 1946	Charlottesville	Virginia	57–29
40	January 25, 1947	Blacksburg	Virginia	58–52
41	January 16, 1948	Charlottesville	Virginia Tech	54–49
42	February 21, 1948	Blacksburg	Virginia Tech	57–43
43	January 31, 1949	Blacksburg	Virginia Tech	52–50
44	February 10, 1949	Charlottesville	Virginia Tech	66–64
45	January 16, 1950	Charlottesville	Virginia Tech	63–50
46	February 18, 1950	Blacksburg	Virginia Tech	78–64
47	January 6, 1951	Charlottesville	Virginia Tech	60–59
48	February 10, 1951	Blacksburg	Virginia Tech	93–62
49	January 26, 1952	Blacksburg	Virginia Tech	93–62
50	February 21, 1952	Charlottesville	Virginia	74–59
51	January 21, 1953	Charlottesville	Virginia	108–95
52	February 17, 1953	Blacksburg	Virginia	87–85
53	December 30, 1953	Richmond	Virginia	97–81
54	January 12, 1954	Blacksburg	Virginia	95–73
55	February 22, 1954	Charlottesville	Virginia	78–69
56	February 18, 1955	Blacksburg	Virginia	107–59
57	February 25, 1955	Charlottesville	Virginia Tech	78–72
58	December 29, 1955	Richmond	Virginia	103–85
59	January 7, 1956	Charlottesville	Virginia	71–66
60	February 4, 1956	Blacksburg	Virginia Tech	76–64
61	February 2, 1957	Blacksburg	Virginia Tech	70–56
62	January 7, 1958	Charlottesville	Virginia	80–66
63	December 4, 1958	Blacksburg	Virginia Tech	85–73
64	December 12, 1959	Charlottesville	Virginia Tech	80–72
65	February 18, 1961	Blacksburg	Virginia Tech	105–70
66	January 20, 1962	Charlottesville	Virginia Tech	92–59
67	January 4, 1963	Blacksburg	Virginia Tech	71–63
68	January 26, 1963	Charlottesville	Virginia Tech	75–73
69	January 2, 1964	Blacksburg	Virginia Tech	62–60
70	January 25, 1964	Charlottesville	Virginia Tech	78–62
71	January 4, 1965	Blacksburg	Virginia Tech	73–57
72	February 2, 1966	Charlottesville	Virginia	79–65
73	March 2, 1967	Blacksburg	Virginia Tech	76–60
74	January 6, 1968	Charlottesville	Virginia Tech	84–82
75	December 21, 1968	Salem	Virginia Tech	85–74
76	February 11, 1969	Blacksburg	Virginia Tech	68–64
77	January 7, 1970	Charlottesville	Virginia	81–71
78	December 3, 1970	Hampton	Virginia	68–59
79	January 6, 1971	Blacksburg	Virginia Tech	93–74
80	February 7, 1972	Blacksburg	No. 6 Virginia	107–85
81	February 28, 1973	Blacksburg	Virginia Tech	87–83
82	February 27, 1974	Charlottesville	Virginia	84–70

No.	Date	Location	Winner	Score
83	January 11, 1975	Blacksburg	Virginia Tech	74–73
84	January 14, 1976	Richmond	Virginia Tech	91–69
85	February 25, 1976	Charlottesville	Virginia	79–75
86	December 30, 1976	Richmond	Virginia Tech	65–60
87	January 12, 1977	Hampton	Virginia	55–50
88	February 23, 1977	Roanoke	Virginia Tech	71–62
89	January 18, 1978	Roanoke	No. 13 Virginia	66–62
90	February 11, 1978	Richmond	No. 13 Virginia	72–68
91	January 17, 1979	Richmond	Virginia	93–78
92	February 10, 1979	Roanoke	Virginia	78–72
93	January 14, 1980	Richmond	No. 12 Virginia	65–58
94	January 3, 1981	Roanoke	No. 3 Virginia	64–51
95	February 6, 1982	Roanoke	No. 3 Virginia	80–66
96	January 19, 1983	Richmond	No. 7 Virginia	74–64
97	January 4, 1984	Roanoke	Virginia	74–64
98	February 15, 1984	Richmond	Virginia Tech	56–54
99	January 2, 1985	Norfolk	Virginia	67–59
100	December 10, 1985	Roanoke	Virginia Tech	84–66
101	February 11, 1987	Richmond	Virginia	91–73
102	January 27, 1988	Roanoke	Virginia Tech	66–64
103	January 25, 1989	Richmond	Virginia	113–106
104	January 24, 1990	Roanoke	Virginia	77–59
105	January 23, 1991	Richmond	No. 18 Virginia	86–61
106	February 5, 1992	Roanoke	Virginia	61–57
107	January 30, 1993	Richmond	Virginia Tech	59–53
108	March 2, 1994	Roanoke	Virginia	70–61
109	February 28, 1995	Richmond	No. 13 Virginia	63–62
110	December 29, 1995	Roanoke	No. 21 Virginia Tech	72–64
111	February 25, 1997	Richmond	Virginia	58–57
112	January 12, 1998	Roanoke	Virginia	69–55
113	January 27, 1999	Richmond	Virginia	64–55
114	January 24, 2000	Richmond	Virginia	71–66
115	November 24, 2000	Blacksburg	No. 25 Virginia	64–48
116	December 1, 2001	Charlottesville	No. 9 Virginia	69–61
117	January 21, 2003	Blacksburg	Virginia Tech	73–55
118	November 28, 2003	Charlottesville	Virginia	80–65
119	January 27, 2005	Blacksburg	Virginia Tech	79–73
120	February 12, 2005	Charlottesville	Virginia	65–60
121	January 15, 2006	Blacksburg	Virginia	54–49
122	February 11, 2006	Charlottesville	Virginia	81–77
123	March 9, 2006	Greensboro	Virginia	60–56
124	February 10, 2007	Blacksburg	No. 21 Virginia Tech	84–57
125	March 1, 2007	Charlottesville	Virginia	69–56
126	January 16, 2008	Charlottesville	Virginia Tech	70–69
127	February 2, 2008	Blacksburg	Virginia Tech	72–65
128	January 10, 2009	Blacksburg	Virginia Tech	78–75
129	February 18, 2009	Charlottesville	Virginia	75–61
130	January 28, 2010	Charlottesville	Virginia Tech	76–71
131	February 13, 2010	Blacksburg	Virginia Tech	61–55
132	December 5, 2010	Blacksburg	Virginia	57–54
133	February 19, 2011	Charlottesville	Virginia	61–54
134	January 22, 2012	Charlottesville	Virginia Tech	47–45
135	February 21, 2012	Blacksburg	No. 25 Virginia	61–59
136	January 24, 2013	Blacksburg	Virginia	74–58
137	February 12, 2013	Charlottesville	Virginia	73–55
138	January 25, 2014	Charlottesville	Virginia	65–45
139	February 18, 2014	Blacksburg	No. 14 Virginia	57–53
140	January 25, 2015	Blacksburg	No. 2 Virginia	50–47
141	February 28, 2015	Charlottesville	No. 2 Virginia	69–57
142	January 4, 2016	Blacksburg	Virginia Tech	70–68
143	February 9, 2016	Charlottesville	No. 7 Virginia	67–49
144	February 1, 2017	Charlottesville	No. 9 Virginia	71–48
145	February 12, 2017	Blacksburg	Virginia Tech	80–78^{2OT}
146	January 3, 2018	Blacksburg	No. 8 Virginia	78–52
147	February 10, 2018	Charlottesville	Virginia Tech	61–60
148	January 15, 2019	Charlottesville	No. 4 Virginia	81–59
149	February 18, 2019	Blacksburg	No. 3 Virginia	64–58
150	January 4, 2020	Charlottesville	No. 19 Virginia	65–39
151	February 26, 2020	Blacksburg	Virginia	56–53
152	January 30, 2021	Blacksburg	No. 20 Virginia Tech	65–51
153	January 12, 2022	Charlottesville	Virginia	54–52
154	February 14, 2022	Blacksburg	Virginia Tech	62–53
155	January 18, 2023	Charlottesville	No. 10 Virginia	78–68
156	February 4, 2023	Blacksburg	Virginia Tech	74–68
157	January 17, 2024	Charlottesville	Virginia	65–57
158	February 19, 2024	Blacksburg	Virginia Tech	75–41
159	February 1, 2025	Charlottesville	Virginia Tech	75–74
160	February 15, 2025	Blacksburg	Virginia	73–70
161	December 31, 2025	Blacksburg	Virginia Tech	95–85^{3OT}
162	March 7, 2026	Charlottesville	No. 13 Virginia	76–72
Series: Virginia leads 100–62

== Wins by decade ==
The Virginia Cavaliers have held the upper hand in the rivalry across most every decade of play since this series began in 1915, save for the 1950s (tied) and 1960s (Tech dominance).

Location	UVA	VT
1910s	2	0
1920s	9	2
1930s	12	4
1940s	9	6
1950s	10	10
1960s	1	11
1970s	10	6
1980s	8	3
1990s	8	2
2000s	9	6
2010s	14	6
2020s	7	6

== See also ==
- Virginia–Virginia Tech rivalry
- Virginia–Virginia Tech football rivalry
