= Wahoos (University of Virginia) =

Unofficial nickname for the University of Virginia

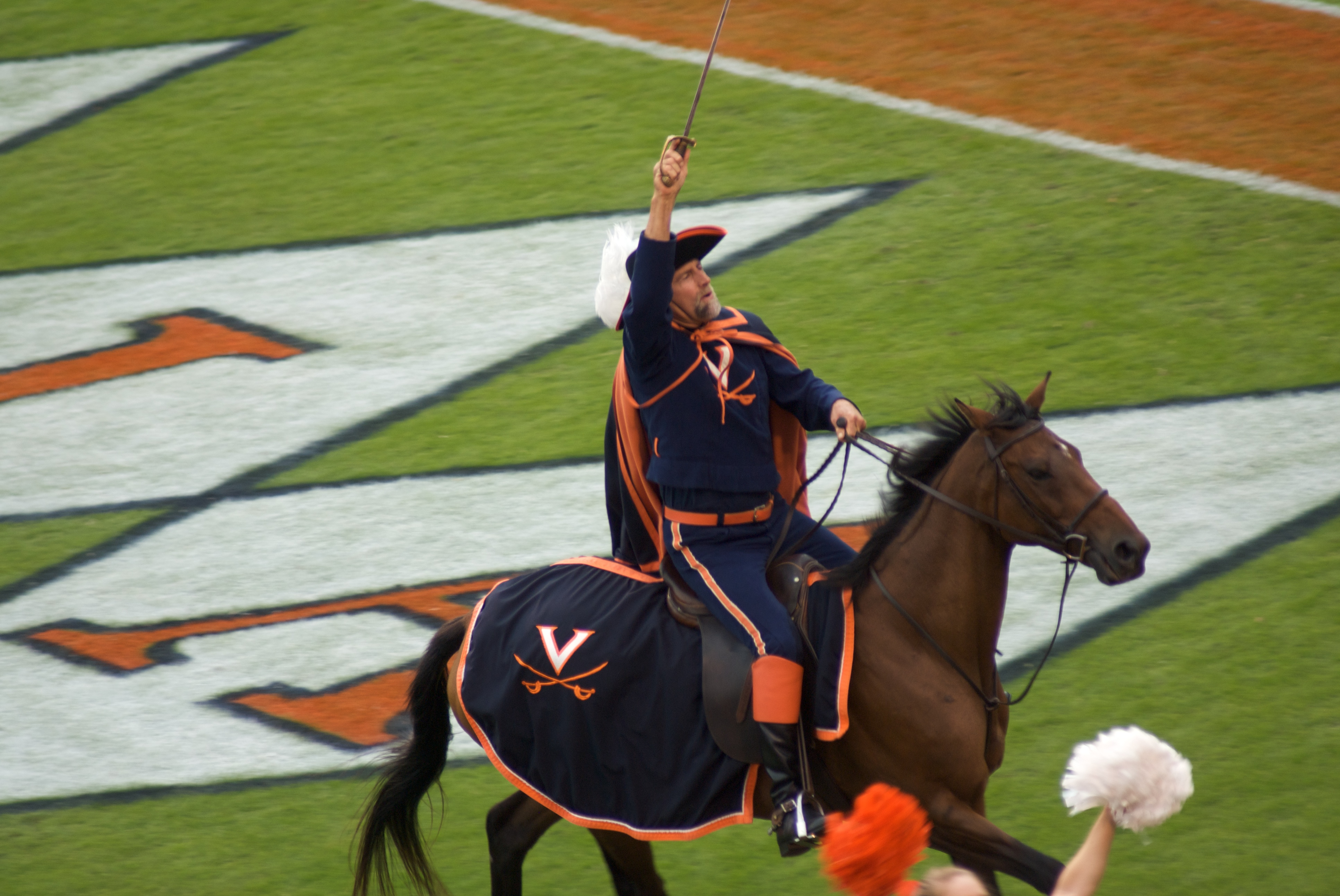
A mascot of a Virginia Cavalier, unofficially a Wahoo, at a football game, September 2009

Wahoos, often shortened to 'Hoos, is a nickname for sports teams of the University of Virginia (officially the Cavaliers), and more generally, a nickname for University students and alumni.

== Origins ==
The nickname is a back-formation from the school's yell, "wa-hoo-wa."

Official University of Virginia sports documents explain that Washington and Lee baseball fans first called University of Virginia players "a bunch of rowdy Wahoos," and used the "Wahoowa" yell as a form of derision during the in-state baseball rivalry in the 1890s, presumably after hearing them yell or sing "wa-hoo-wa." The term "Wahoos" spread around the University and was commonly in use by the 1940s. "'Hoos" emerged as an equally commonly accepted nickname at the university and in student publications. Although the terms “Cavaliers,” “Wahoos” and “‘Hoos” are used almost interchangeably to refer to University teams and players, “Cavaliers” is more often used by the media, while “Wahoos” and “‘Hoos” are frequently used by Virginia students and fans.

The yell was invented as an Indian yell for Dartmouth College by Dartmouth student Daniel Rollins in 1878. Corks & Curls, the University of Virginia annual, regularly printed lists of the yells and colors of the various colleges; in 1888 it included Dartmouth's school yell, a part of which was the phrase "wa-hoo-wa." University of Virginia students soon incorporated the phrase "wa-hoo-wa" into their own, longer school yell, and individual U.Va. fraternities also adopted it and modified it. It was common for such student culture to travel: the University of Illinois also adopted "wa-hoo-wa." Dartmouth students, meanwhile, largely stopped using the Indian yell during the 1980s along with the accompanying Indian mascots, symbols, and nickname.

The yell was already in use by the time Nathalie Floyd Otey performed at the Levy Opera House in Charlottesville on January 30, 1893. She sang a song specifically about the town and University titled "Wa-Hoo-Wa" that began, "Oh, Charlottesville, illustrious name,/ The home of Jefferson you claim;/ The lap of learning, font of fame—" and was set to the tune of "Ta-ra-ra Boom-de-ay," with the catchy chorus sung as "Wa-hoo-wa you-vee-ay." Otey's song was popular enough with students that Corks & Curls printed it in 1894. Legend, however, states that Otey sang "Where'er You Are, There Shall My Love Be". The student audience decided to join in the refrain of the song and by the end of the play the crowd turned the words "Where'er You Are" into "Wah Hoo Wah." Both events might have occurred, since an enthusiastic student audience might reasonably be presumed to sing along with Otey after hearing her sing "Wah-Hoo-Wah."

While there is no evidence that the nickname stems from the wahoo fish, it is often claimed by students that a "wahoo is a type of bass fish that is capable [of] drinking twice its weight."

== The Good Old Song ==
The "wah-hoo-wah" yell is memorialized in The Good Old Song, the de facto alma mater of the University of Virginia written in the mid-1890s, which describes "the good old song of Wah-Hoo-Wah." The song is sung by the spectators at Virginia football games after a score.
