= Virginia–Virginia Tech football rivalry =

American college football rivalry

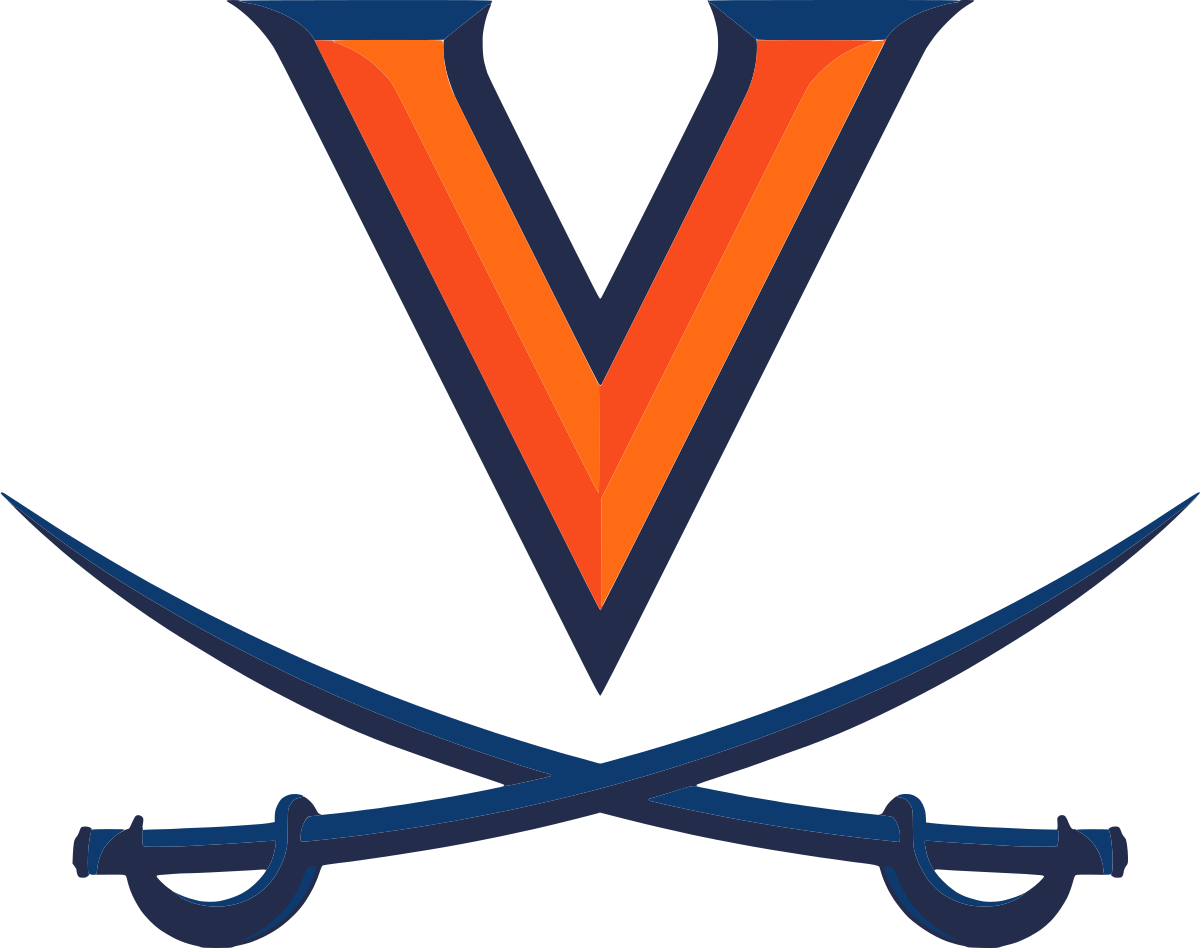
- Virginia Cavaliers Virginia Tech Hokies
- Location: Virginia, United States
- First meeting: October 5, 1895; Virginia, 38–0
- Latest meeting: November 29, 2025; Virginia, 27–7
- Next meeting: November 28, 2026
- Stadiums: Scott Stadium (est. 1931); Lane Stadium (est. 1965)
- Trophy: Commonwealth Cup

Statistics
- Total meetings: 106
- All-time record: Virginia Tech leads, 62–39–5
- Trophy series: Commonwealth Clash
- Largest victory: Virginia Tech, 48–0 (1983)
- Longest win streak: Virginia Tech, 15 (2004–2018)
- Current win streak: Virginia, 1 (2025–present)

Locations of Virginia and Virginia Tech

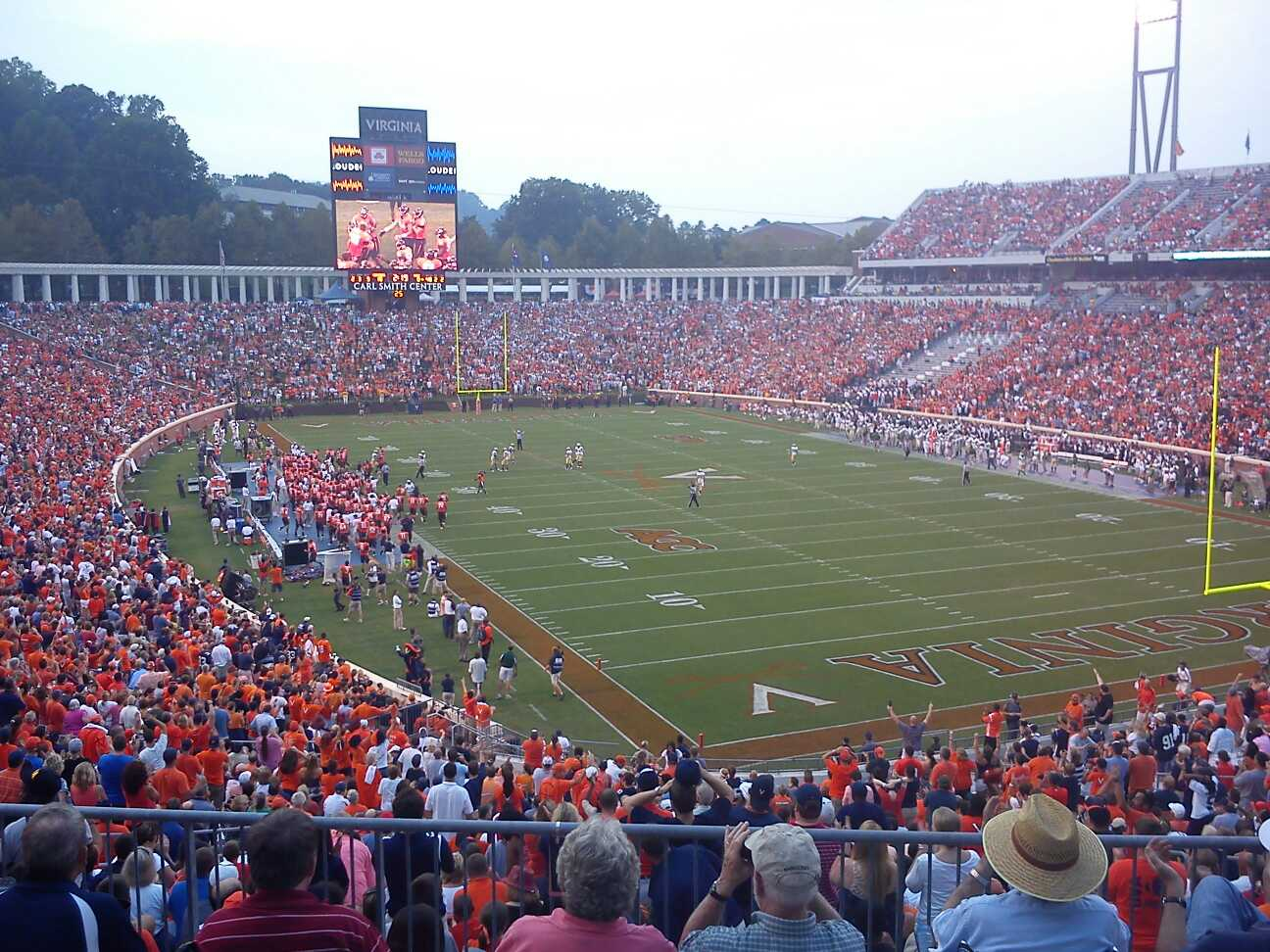
Opened in 1931, Scott Stadium is the oldest active football stadium in Virginia and is home of the Virginia Cavaliers. It has a capacity of 61,500.

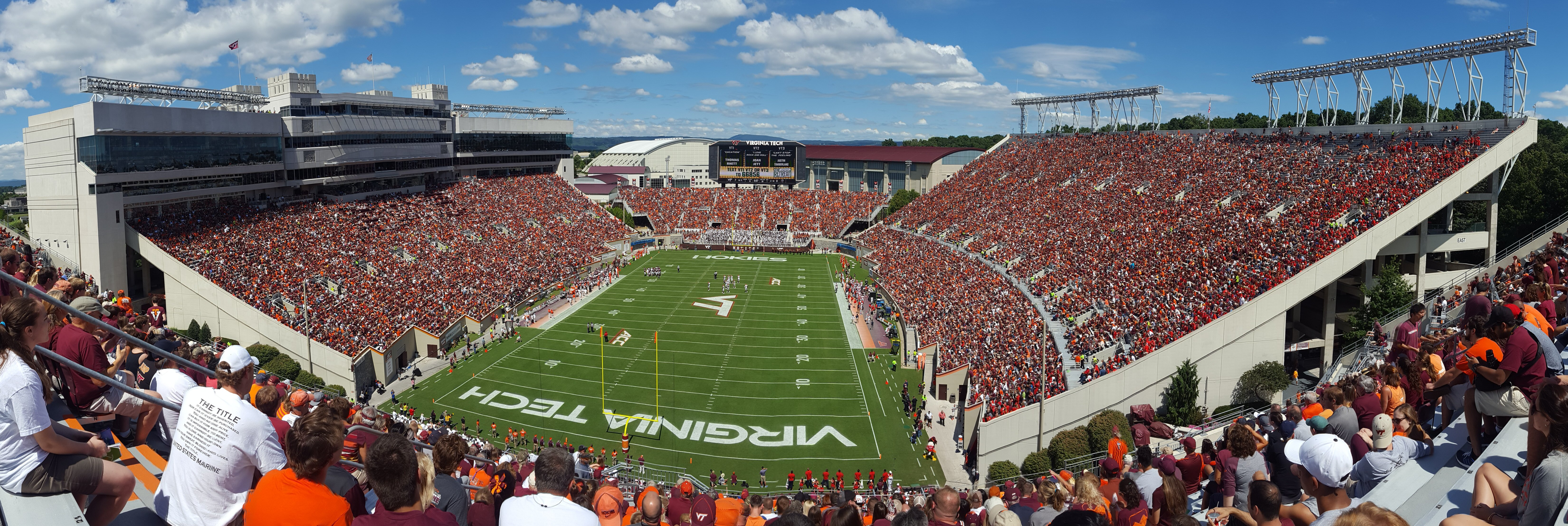
Opened in 1965, Lane Stadium is the largest active football stadium in Virginia and is home of the Virginia Tech Hokies. It has a capacity of 65,632.

The Virginia–Virginia Tech football rivalry, also referred to as its multi-sport rivalry name the Commonwealth Clash, is an American college football rivalry between the Virginia Cavaliers football team of the University of Virginia (called Virginia in sports media and abbreviated UVA) and Virginia Tech Hokies football team of Virginia Polytechnic Institute and State University (called Virginia Tech and abbreviated VT). The two schools first met in 1895 and have played annually since 1970. The game counts for 1 point in the Commonwealth Clash each year, and is part of the greater Virginia–Virginia Tech rivalry.

Since 1990, the game has nearly always been held in late November, often on Thanksgiving weekend. The scheduling of this rivalry has taken the place of Virginia's South's Oldest Rivalry game versus North Carolina, which was played on Thanksgiving Day every year between 1910 and 1950 (save for when the programs disbanded during World War I). (Note: There was no lasting or set scheduling to either rivalry between 1951 and 1989.) It has also taken the place of the VMI–Virginia Tech football rivalry which was held on Thanksgiving Day up through 1971. In 1964, the UVA–VPI (Note: VPI changed its name to Virginia Tech in 1970.) game began alternating between Lane Stadium and Scott Stadium on the campuses of the two universities. Previously, the series was sometimes played in Richmond, Norfolk, and at Victory Stadium in Roanoke. (Note: in Richmond 1903–1904 and 1957; in Norfolk 1940–1942; and in Roanoke 17 of 19 years from 1945 to 1963)

The rivalry has seen many streaks. Virginia started 8–0 in the series, outscoring VPI 175–5. The Cavaliers again went unbeaten (7–0–1) from 1945 to 1952, outscoring the Gobblers (Note: Virginia Tech teams were called the Gobblers until 1981.) 267–47, with four shutouts. VPI then went 12–2 in games from 1953 to 1966. More recently, Virginia Tech won a series record fifteen straight games from 2004–2018 before the Cavaliers defeated the Hokies in 2019 en route to the program's first Orange Bowl.

Virginia and Virginia Tech were both led by College Football Hall of Fame coaches in the 1980s and 1990s. George Welsh led UVA to a three-week run as the nation's AP No. 1 ranked team in 1990; shared ACC championships in 1989 and 1995; 85 ACC wins, second-most all-time (behind only Bobby Bowden); and an 8–6 record against Frank Beamer, a fellow Hall of Famer who led Virginia Tech to an appearance in a BCS National Championship Game; sole ACC championships in 2004, 2007, 2008, and 2010; four previous Big East Championships; and a dominant 14–1 record against Welsh's successors (Al Groh and Mike London). This rivalry game three times served as the de facto Coastal Division Championship Game: in 2007 and 2011 those games were won by Beamer's Hokies; in the final such contest in 2019, it was won by the Cavaliers. (Note: The ACC did away with its divisions in 2023.)

== Commonwealth Cup Trophy ==
In 1996, a trophy was created for the rivalry, known as the Commonwealth Cup. The winning team holds the trophy until the next game, which has been held annually since 1970. Currently, the Virginia Cavaliers football team holds the cup, having won the 2025 edition of the contest.

The trophy is constructed of marble and cherry wood, and is four feet high. It also contains the scores of all of the games in the series. The cup is engraved with the names of the two schools and is mounted atop a trapezoidal base that makes up most of the trophy's length. The front of the base features a stylized map of Virginia with Blacksburg and Charlottesville represented by stars on the map.'

== History ==
The Virginia–Virginia Tech rivalry has existed since the 1890s, but did not reach pre-eminence until the 1980s. Traditionally, Virginia's primary rival had been the Tar Heels of the University of North Carolina at Chapel Hill, in a game which became known as the South's Oldest Rivalry. UVA and UNC had the most successful football programs of early Southern college football, as the name indicates: between 1889 and 1902, either Virginia or North Carolina claimed a southern championship in twelve out of fourteen years. VPI's rival was the Virginia Military Institute, with whom they shared a military tradition, geographic proximity, and similar acronyms (VMI and VPI).

The Virginia–VPI rivalry did have its heated moments, even early on. Hokie Hunter Carpenter, played nearly two full modern college football careers with Virginia Tech and the University of North Carolina. " The Cavalier Daily accused Carpenter of being paid, as he had played college football already for nearly a decade. Carpenter signed an affidavit that he had not received payment to play against UVA in any of the eight years (two of which he actually played for UNC in the South's Oldest Rivalry). After the VPI victory, Carpenter threatened to sue the UVA student paper for libel and UVA refused to play VPI again for eighteen years after, until 1923. Carpenter moved to Middletown, New York and never returned to the Commonwealth.

This rivalry game has been played in late November, often on Thanksgiving weekend, each year since 2000 and in every year but two (1999, when the game was played early in the season, and 2020, when the game was postponed two weeks due to the COVID-19 pandemic) since 1990. This was not always the case, as the aforementioned Virginia–Carolina and VPI–VMI rivalry games were played on Thanksgiving Day for much of the 20th century. In the wake of the 2022 University of Virginia shooting, resulting in the death of three Virginia players, the 2022 edition was cancelled.

== Memorable games ==
=== 1995: Tech Comeback ===
The Virginia Cavaliers came into this contest looking for their ninth regular season win. Virginia led 29–14 going into the fourth quarter, however Virginia Tech then stormed back and a Jim Druckenmiller touchdown pass to Jermaine Holmes gave the Hokies the lead with forty seven seconds left. The Cavaliers' last attempt to win the game was then snuffed out when a Mike Groh pass was intercepted and taken to the endzone by Antonio Banks, who sped by a joking sideline tripping attempt by a UVA athletic trainer that attracted national attention. The Hokies went on to the 1995 Sugar Bowl to defeat Texas, whereas Virginia went on to the 1995 Peach Bowl to defeat Georgia.

=== 1998: Cavalier Revenge ===
Both teams entered the matchup in ranked in the Top 25 and looking for their ninth win. Virginia Tech took no time jumping out in front. The Hokies took a 17–0 lead early and led at halftime 29–7. The Hoos then came out on fire and outscored the Hokies 29–3 in the second half. A now legendary touchdown pass from quarterback Aaron Brooks to Ahmad Hawkins put Virginia up by four, and a Wali Rainer interception preserved a Virginia comeback victory, arguably their most impressive win in Blacksburg. By erasing a 22-point deficit in the second half, the Cavalier victory made for the greatest comeback win of the long series by either program. As in 1995, Virginia again faced Georgia, and again in the Peach Bowl, but this time narrowly losing. Virginia Tech easily defeated Alabama in the 1998 Music City Bowl.

=== 2003: Wali's World ===
The Virginia Cavaliers entered the 2003 Commonwealth Cup looking to snap a four game losing streak against the Hokies. Virginia Tech led 14–7 at the half, but Virginia came out in the second half firing on all cylinders, and outscored Tech 21–0 by the 14 minute mark in the fourth quarter. Up by seven with only a few minutes left, Virginia pulled off a fake field goal on fourth down to keep possession away from the Hokies. Wali Lundy ran in it for the score on the next play, capping a dominant performance of three rushing touchdowns and a receiving touchdown. Virginia held on to the win 35–21. This game also saw Matt Schaub tie Shawn Moore for all time passing touchdowns at Virginia. The Cavaliers defeated Pittsburgh in the 2003 Continental Tire Bowl, while the Hokies lost to California in the 2003 Insight Bowl.

=== 2018: The Fumble Touchdown ===
The 2018 rivalry game saw the first overtime game, and perhaps the most dramatic fourth quarter, thus far in the long series. Virginia had high hopes of ending the 14-game losing streak against a Tech team that had mostly limped through the season. But Virginia Tech led 14–0 at halftime, only to fall behind by a touchdown with only two minutes remaining. On the ensuing Tech drive, the Hokies drove to the redzone. Hokie running back Steven Peoples fumbled the ball inside the five-yard line but it was recovered by wide receiver Hezekiah Grimsley in the endzone for a touchdown. The game then went into overtime and the Hokies managed only a field goal. Virginia completed a pass to the Hokie 14 on their first play, but quarterback Bryce Perkins fumbled on the next, and it was recovered by the defense to end the game, with a most unlikely Virginia Tech victory that extended their winning streak to 15 and bowl streak to 26. Despite the rivalry loss, Virginia went on to dominate South Carolina 28–0 in the 2018 Belk Bowl, while Virginia Tech lost to Cincinnati in the 2018 Military Bowl.

=== 2019: Coastal championship on the line ===
No. 24 Virginia Tech (8–3) and unranked Virginia (8–3) entered the game in a tie for 1st place in the Coastal Division with identical 5–2 ACC records, making the traditional Thanksgiving weekend matchup a de facto Coastal Championship Game with the winner advancing to the 2019 ACC Championship Game against Clemson. The Hokies rolled in with a full head of steam, as quarterback Hendon Hooker was 6–0 as a starter and the Virginia Tech defense had just shut down Georgia Tech and Pittsburgh by the combined score of 73–0 in Bud Foster's final season. The Hokies had also won 15 consecutive games in the rivalry and were slight favorites to win again. Bryce Perkins completed 20-of-33 passes for 311 yards and rushed for another 164, totaling 475 combined yards. Perkins set the tone early with a pair of long first-quarter touchdown runs. In the fourth quarter, Cavalier kicker Brian Delaney made a 48-yard field goal with 1:23 left in the game to give UVA a 33–30 lead. On the next drive, Virginia Tech fumbled in its own end zone which was recovered by Virginia with 1:01 left, effectively ending the game. Virginia fans rushed the field for the program's first accepted Orange Bowl bid (after declining an Orange Bowl invite 68 years earlier) and in the process the Cavaliers also ended their long losing streak against the Hokies. Virginia went on to face Florida in the 2019 Orange Bowl while Virginia Tech faced Kentucky in the 2019 Belk Bowl, both losing narrowly.

== Game results ==
Virginia victories	Virginia Tech victories	Tie games

No.	Date	Location	Winner	Score
1	October 5, 1895	Charlottesville	Virginia	38–0
2	October 31, 1896	Charlottesville	Virginia	44–0
3	November 11, 1899	Charlottesville	Virginia	28–0
4	November 14, 1900	Charlottesville	Virginia	17–5
5	October 26, 1901	Charlottesville	Virginia	16–0
6	November 15, 1902	Charlottesville	Virginia	6–0
7	October 24, 1903	Richmond	Virginia	21–0
8	November 5, 1904	Richmond	Virginia	5–0
9	November 4, 1905	Charlottesville	VPI	11–0
10	November 17, 1923	Charlottesville	VPI	6–3
11	November 15, 1924	Charlottesville	Virginia	6–0
12	November 14, 1925	Charlottesville	Virginia	10–0
13	October 23, 1926	Blacksburg	VPI	6–0
14	October 22, 1927	Charlottesville	Virginia	7–0
15	November 10, 1928	Blacksburg	VPI	20–0
16	November 9, 1929	Charlottesville	VPI	32–12
17	November 8, 1930	Blacksburg	VPI	31–13
18	November 14, 1931	Charlottesville	Tie	0–0
19	November 12, 1932	Blacksburg	VPI	13–0
20	November 18, 1933	Charlottesville	Tie	6–6
21	November 17, 1934	Blacksburg	VPI	19–6
22	November 16, 1935	Charlottesville	Tie	0–0
23	November 14, 1936	Blacksburg	VPI	7–6
24	November 13, 1937	Charlottesville	VPI	14–7
25	October 15, 1938	Blacksburg	Virginia	14–6
26	November 18, 1939	Charlottesville	VPI	13–0
27	November 2, 1940	Norfolk	VPI	6–0
28	November 1, 1941	Norfolk	Virginia	34–0
29	October 31, 1942	Norfolk	VPI	20–14
30	October 27, 1945	Roanoke	Virginia	31–13
31	October 5, 1946	Roanoke	Tie	21–21
32	October 4, 1947	Roanoke	Virginia	41–7
33	October 2, 1948	Roanoke	Virginia	28–0
34	October 8, 1949	Roanoke	Virginia	26–0
35	October 7, 1950	Roanoke	Virginia	45–6
36	October 6, 1951	Roanoke	Virginia	33–0
37	October 4, 1952	Roanoke	#16 Virginia	42–0
38	September 26, 1953	Charlottesville	VPI	20–6
39	October 23, 1954	Roanoke	VPI	6–0
40	October 22, 1955	Roanoke	VPI	17–13
41	October 27, 1956	Roanoke	VPI	14–7
42	October 19, 1957	Richmond	Virginia	38–7
43	October 11, 1958	Roanoke	VPI	22–13
44	October 17, 1959	Richmond	VPI	40–14
45	October 22, 1960	Roanoke	VPI	40–6
46	October 21, 1961	Roanoke	VPI	20–0
47	October 6, 1962	Roanoke	VPI	20–15
48	October 5, 1963	Roanoke	VPI	10–0
49	October 3, 1964	Charlottesville	Virginia	20–17
50	October 23, 1965	Blacksburg	VPI	22–14
51	October 22, 1966	Charlottesville	VPI	24–7
52	September 12, 1970	Blacksburg	Virginia	7–0
53	November 6, 1971	Charlottesville	Virginia Tech	6–0
54	September 16, 1972	Charlottesville	Virginia	24–20

No.	Date	Location	Winner	Score
55	October 20, 1973	Blacksburg	Virginia Tech	27–15
56	October 19, 1974	Charlottesville	Virginia	28–27
57	October 18, 1975	Blacksburg	Virginia Tech	24–17
58	October 16, 1976	Charlottesville	Virginia Tech	14–10
59	October 15, 1977	Blacksburg	Tie	14–14
60	October 21, 1978	Charlottesville	Virginia	17–7
61	November 10, 1979	Charlottesville	Virginia	20–18
62	October 18, 1980	Blacksburg	Virginia Tech	30–0
63	November 28, 1981	Charlottesville	Virginia Tech	20–3
64	November 25, 1982	Blacksburg	Virginia Tech	21–14
65	November 19, 1983	Charlottesville	Virginia Tech	48–0
66	September 29, 1984	Blacksburg	Virginia	26–23
67	October 19, 1985	Charlottesville	Virginia Tech	28–10
68	October 25, 1986	Blacksburg	Virginia Tech	42–10
69	September 19, 1987	Charlottesville	Virginia	14–13
70	October 29, 1988	Blacksburg	Virginia	16–10
71	November 11, 1989	Charlottesville	#18 Virginia	32–25
72	November 24, 1990	Blacksburg	Virginia Tech	38–13
73	November 23, 1991	Charlottesville	#20 Virginia	38–0
74	November 21, 1992	Blacksburg	#23 Virginia	41–38
75	November 20, 1993	Charlottesville	Virginia Tech	20–17
76	November 19, 1994	Blacksburg	#16 Virginia	42–23
77	November 18, 1995	Charlottesville	#20 Virginia Tech	36–29
78	November 29, 1996	Blacksburg	#17 Virginia Tech	26–9
79	November 29, 1997	Charlottesville	Virginia	34–20
80	November 28, 1998	Blacksburg	#16 Virginia	36–32
81	October 2, 1999	Charlottesville	#8 Virginia Tech	31–7
82	November 25, 2000	Blacksburg	#6 Virginia Tech	42–21
83	November 17, 2001	Charlottesville	#18 Virginia Tech	31–17
84	November 30, 2002	Blacksburg	#22 Virginia Tech	21–9
85	November 29, 2003	Charlottesville	Virginia	35–21
86	November 27, 2004	Blacksburg	#11 Virginia Tech	24–10
87	November 19, 2005	Charlottesville	#7 Virginia Tech	52–14
88	November 25, 2006	Blacksburg	#17 Virginia Tech	17–0
89	November 24, 2007	Charlottesville	#8 Virginia Tech	33–21
90	November 29, 2008	Blacksburg	Virginia Tech	17–14
91	November 28, 2009	Charlottesville	#14 Virginia Tech	42–13
92	November 27, 2010	Blacksburg	#14 Virginia Tech	37–7
93	November 26, 2011	Charlottesville	#6 Virginia Tech	38–0
94	November 24, 2012	Blacksburg	Virginia Tech	17–14
95	November 30, 2013	Charlottesville	Virginia Tech	16–6
96	November 28, 2014	Blacksburg	Virginia Tech	24–20
97	November 28, 2015	Charlottesville	Virginia Tech	23–20
98	November 26, 2016	Blacksburg	Virginia Tech	52–10
99	November 24, 2017	Charlottesville	#24 Virginia Tech	10–0
100	November 23, 2018	Blacksburg	Virginia Tech	34–31^{OT}
101	November 29, 2019	Charlottesville	Virginia	39–30
102	December 12, 2020	Blacksburg	Virginia Tech	33–15
103	November 27, 2021	Charlottesville	Virginia Tech	29–24
104	November 25, 2023	Charlottesville	Virginia Tech	55–17
105	November 30, 2024	Blacksburg	Virginia Tech	37–17
106	November 29, 2025	Charlottesville	#17 Virginia	27–7
Series: Virginia Tech leads 62–39–5
Game scheduled for November 26, 2022, cancelled due to UVA shooting.

== See also ==
- List of NCAA college football rivalry games
- List of most-played college football series in NCAA Division I
- Virginia–Virginia Tech men's basketball rivalry
