= Carla Williams (athletic director) =

American college sports administrator

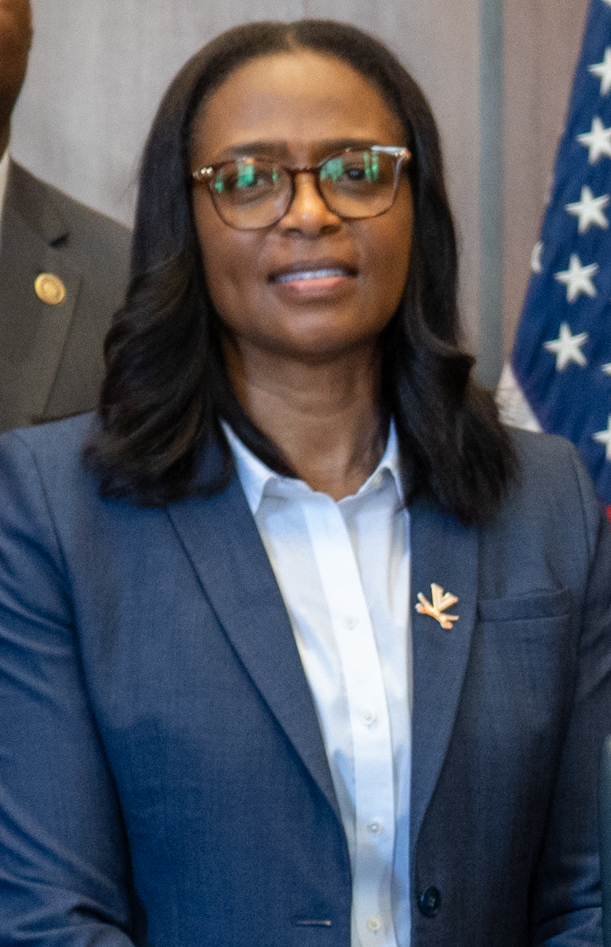
- Wiliams in 2024

Current position
- Title: Athletic director
- Team: Virginia
- Conference: ACC

Biographical details
- Born: LaGrange, Georgia, U.S.

Playing career
- 1987–1989: Georgia

Administrative career (AD unless noted)
- 2000–2003: Vanderbilt (assistant AD)
- 2003–2004: Vanderbilt (associate AD)
- 2004–2008: Georgia (associate AD)
- 2008–2011: Georgia (senior associate AD)
- 2011–2015: Georgia (executive AD)
- 2015–2017: Georgia (deputy AD)
- 2017–present: Virginia

Carla Williams (née Green) is the athletic director of the Virginia Cavaliers. She is the first African American woman in the Power Five conferences to hold this position.

== Early life ==
Williams was born to parents Barner and Johnnie Mae in LaGrange, Georgia. In middle school, she played quarterback and running back in organized football, as well as basketball and softball. While attending LaGrange High School, Williams played point guard for the Georgia Metros. Her coaches would drive her two hours there and back to practice. During her high school career, Williams led LaGrange to two Class AAAA state titles and was named the most valuable player of the 1985 Georgia All-Star game. During her senior year of high school, Williams was approached by Andy Landers to recruit her for the women's basketball program at the University of Georgia (UGA).

== Collegiate career ==
After graduating from LaGrange, Williams went to UGA on an athletic scholarship and made the starting lineup in her sophomore year. During that season, she was named to the South squad for the United States Olympic Festival in Houston. She later asked Landers why he offered her a scholarship over other players that were ranked higher and he told her “you have all the intangibles that we need for our program." In 1987, Williams was again named to the United States Olympic Festival and Atlanta Tipoff Club's Division I women's basketball All-Star Team. Upon completing her Bachelor of Arts degree in sociology in 1989, Williams was a four-year letterwinner and finished her career with 1,115 points. She was also an All-SEC selection guard and tenth highest scorer in UGA women's basketball history.

== Career ==
After graduating from UGA in 1989, Williams competed in professional basketball in Spain, but was encouraged by Jerry Legge to return to her alma mater to complete a Master's degree of Public Administration. After completing her MPA, Williams became an assistant coach for the Lady Bulldogs until 1996 under Andy Landers, who she played for as an athlete. During her time as a coach, she helped the Lady Bulldogs advance to consecutive Final Fours in 1995 and 1996, and the ’96 national championship game against Tennessee. After five years in this role, she moved to Florida State University (FSU) when her husband accepted a job there, taking a pay cut to work an entry-level position in the student services office.

During her time at FSU, Williams also completed her doctorate in sports administration and volunteered for the Florida State Seminoles Director of Athletics Dave Hart in several areas in the department including radio and television broadcasts. Upon finishing her degree, Williams accepted a position at Vanderbilt University as an associate athletics director and senior women’s administrator where she oversaw varsity women’s basketball, men’s and women’s tennis, women’s soccer, the Hendrix Dining Room and video operations. In 2004, Williams returned to Georgia as an associate director of athletics before becoming the deputy athletics director.

As the athletics director of the University of Georgia, Williams served on the executive committee of both the National Association of Collegiate Directors of Athletics and the National Association of Collegiate Women Athletic Administrators, as well the NCAA's Woman of the Year Selection and Women's Basketball Issues Committees. In recognition of her efforts, she was named one of the top-10 Senior Woman Administrators in the NCAA. She was also the recipient of the Athens Woman of Distinction by the Girl Scouts of Historic Georgia.

After spending 13 years in athletic administration at Georgia, Williams became the first African-American woman to lead an athletic department at a Power 5 school (ACC, SEC, Big Ten, Big 12 and Pac-12). She joined the faculty at the University of Virginia as an athletic director in 2017. She began her tenure at the institution by announcing The Master Plan, a project to "address the immediate needs to upgrade facilities for the Cavalier football program and UVA Olympic Sports." In recognition of her efforts, Williams received UGA's Bill Hartman Award as someone who has "demonstrated excellence in their profession and/or in service to others by 20 or more years of superior performance after graduation."

== Career statistics ==
Legend
GP	Games played	GS	Games started	MPG	Minutes per game	RPG	Rebounds per game
APG	Assists per game	SPG	Steals per game	BPG	Blocks per game	PPG	Points per game
TO	Turnovers per game	FG%	Field-goal percentage	3P%	3-point field-goal percentage	FT%	Free-throw percentage
**Bold**	Career best	°	League leader

=== College ===
class="sortbottom"

Year	Team	GP	GS	MPG	FG%	3P%	FT%	RPG	APG	SPG	BPG	TO	PPG
1987–88	Georgia	**31**	-	-	37.2	**37.9**	**73.9**	3.0	**4.7**	2.1	**0.5**	-	11.2
1988–89	Georgia	30	-	-	**40.4**	35.0	71.4	**5.6**	3.6	**2.9**	0.2	-	**11.8**
**Career**		61	-	-	38.9	33.7	72.9	4.3	4.2	2.5	0.3	-	11.5
Statistics retrieved from Sports-Reference.

== Personal life ==
Williams and her husband, Brian, have three children together.
