= The Good Old Song =

Song

"The Good Old Song" (alternatively spelled as "The Good Ole Song") is the de facto school song of the University of Virginia. It is often said to be the university's fight song, although the actual fight song is "The Cavalier Song". It is set to the music of "Auld Lang Syne", a song frequently sung on New Year's Eve.

The "Good Old Song" is most commonly sung by Virginia Cavaliers fans following sporting events. Fans embrace as they sway back and forth, singing the first verse of the song, followed by pumping fists while screaming the chant. It is also sung at football games immediately following each Cavalier score (or the extra point attempt).

== History and authorship ==
Various sources ascribe the authorship of "The Good Old Song" to Virginia Glee Club member Edward A. Craighill circa 1895 even though Craighill's 1922 article on the song disclaims sole authorship. The best documentary evidence to date indicates that the song's lyrics were more or less spontaneously composed by a group of students in 1893, and that by 1894 the song was already being documented in the student annual, Corks and Curls.

"The Good Old Song" was the university's de facto school song by 1900. Student referendums over the years have purported to give significance to other songs on occasion — "Virginia, Hail, All Hail!" and "The Cavalier Song" won a 1923 contest sponsored by the student newspaper, The Cavalier Daily, and were named the university's alma mater song and fight song, respectively — but they failed to gain traction and remain relatively unknown among the general student body unless they try again to make it known by gaining traction again.

Verse 1
That good old song of Wah-hoo-wah—we'll sing it o'er and o'er

It cheers our hearts and warms our blood to hear them shout and roar

We come from old Virginia, where all is bright and gay

Let's all join hands and give a yell for the dear old UVA.

Chant
Wah-hoo-wah, wah-hoo-wah! Uni-v, Virginia!

Hoo-rah-ray, hoo-rah-ray, ray, ray—UVA!
Verse 2
What though the tide of years may roll, and drift us far apart

For alma mater still there'll be a place in every heart.

In college days we sing her praise, and so, when far away,

In memory we still shall be at the dear old UVA.

According to the Virginia Pep Band, the university's band from 1974 to 2003, the university's Athletic's Department attempted to replace "The Good Old Song" with a more lively post-touchdown song during the 1970s. They relate that the students of the Pep Band refused to abandon the song in spite of the orders, and it is thus still played today.

== Controversy ==
Since the 1970s, it had become a practice of some fans to insert a chant of "Not gay!" after the line "Where all is bright and gay". Petitions and organized protests against the practice began in 2001. Today, more commonly, some fans, after that portion of the song, shout, "Fuck Tech", instead referring to Virginia Tech, UVA's biggest rival. The university released a video in September 2019 requesting that students "Keep the 'Good Old Song' good" by refraining from using either jeer.
