= Capital One Cup =

Multi-sport award

- League: NCAA Division I
- Awarded for: Awarded annually to each of the best men's and women's Division I college athletics programs in the country

History
- Most wins: Men: Stanford Cardinal, Florida Gators, Notre Dame Fighting Irish (3); Women: Stanford Cardinal (7)
- Most recent: Men: Michigan Wolverines; Women: Texas Longhorns

The Capital One Cup is a multi-sport award given to a school to acknowledge athletic success across all sports. Several sports programs from higher-education institutions across the United States are pitted against each other, acquiring points throughout the school year based on how individual sports teams finish in national championships. Sports are divided into two groups based on popularity and pool of competition, with Group B scoring three times the number of points of Group A. There are separate cups for men's and women's sports. The winning school for both men and women receives $200,000 to their student athlete scholarship fund. Stanford University, University of Notre Dame and the University of Florida are tied for the most titles in the men's competition with three each. Stanford University has won the most titles in the women's competition with seven. Stanford, along with the University of Florida, are the only two schools to win a Capital One Cup in both the men's and women's divisions.

== Scoring system ==
Unlike the NACDA Directors' Cup which scores each sport equally, the Capital One Cup employs a two-tiered scoring system in which higher profile sports ("Group B") are valued more highly than others ("Group A"). Schools' performances in the Group B sports earn three times as many points as those in Group A. This valuing of certain high-profile sports over smaller, less popular sports has drawn criticism from college sports administrators. In its history, the Capital One Cup has revised its scoring structure on several occasions to adjust such factors as the number of tiers, the inclusion/exclusion of certain sports, and the tier designation of the included sports. With the last revision (2020–21), only 10 sports were given the high-value "Group B" designation.

The current Capital One Cup scoring structure:

| Finish | 1 | 2 | 3 | 4 | 5 | 6 | 7 | 8 | 9 | 10 |
|---|---|---|---|---|---|---|---|---|---|---|
| Group A: | 20 | 12 | 10 | 8 | 6 | 5 | 4 | 3 | 2 | 1 |
| Group B: | 60 | 36 | 30 | 24 | 18 | 15 | 12 | 9 | 6 | 3 |

| Group A Sports | Group B Sports |
|---|---|
| Bowling (W) | Baseball (M) |
| Cross Country (M/W) | Basketball (M/W) |
| Field Hockey (W) | Beach Volleyball (W) |
| Fencing (M/W) | Football (M) |
| Golf (M/W) | Gymnastics (M/W) |
| Ice Hockey (M/W) | Lacrosse (M/W) |
| Indoor Track and Field (M/W) | Soccer (M/W) |
| Outdoor Track and Field (M/W) | Softball (W) |
| Rifle (M/W) | Wrestling (M) |
| Rowing (M/W) | Volleyball (W) |
| Skiing (M/W) | |
| Swimming and Diving (M/W) | |
| Tennis (M/W) | |
| Volleyball (M) | |
| Water Polo (M/W) | |

== Champions ==
| School Year | Men's champion | Women's champion |
|---|---|---|
| 2010–11 | Florida Gators | Stanford Cardinal |
| 2011–12 | Florida Gators | Stanford Cardinal |
| 2012–13 | UCLA Bruins | North Carolina Tar Heels |
| 2013–14 | Notre Dame Fighting Irish | Florida Gators |
| 2014–15 | Virginia Cavaliers | Stanford Cardinal |
| 2015–16 | Stanford Cardinal | USC Trojans |
| 2016–17 | Ohio State Buckeyes | Stanford Cardinal |
| 2017–18 | Stanford Cardinal | Stanford Cardinal |
| 2018–19 | Virginia Cavaliers | Stanford Cardinal |
| 2019–20 | Not awarded due to COVID-19 pandemic. | |
| 2020–21 | Stanford Cardinal | Stanford Cardinal |
| 2021–22 | Notre Dame Fighting Irish | Texas Longhorns |
| 2022–23 | Florida Gators | Texas Longhorns |
| 2023–24 | Notre Dame Fighting Irish | Texas Longhorns |
| 2024–25 | Ohio State Buckeyes | North Carolina Tar Heels |
| 2025–26 | Michigan Wolverines | Texas Longhorns |

== See also ==
- NACDA Directors' Cup
