= The Cavalier Song =

University of Virginia's fight song

"The Cavalier Song" is the University of Virginia's fight song. The song was a result of a contest held in 1923 by College Topics, the university's student newspaper. "The Cavalier Song," with lyrics by Lawrence Haywood Lee Jr., and music by Virginia Glee Club member Fulton Lewis Jr., was chosen as best fight song while John A. Morrow's "Virginia, Hail, All Hail" was chosen as the best alma mater song.

Generally the second half of the song is played during sporting events while the entire song used to be part of the Cavalier Marching Band's entrance during home football games. The song has been recorded by both the Cavalier Marching Band and the Virginia Glee Club.

== See also ==
- "The Good Old Song", the University of Virginia's unofficial alma mater, which is often mistakenly termed a "fight song."
