= Virginia Cavaliers =

University of Virginia intercollegiate sports teams

- University: University of Virginia
- Nickname: Cavaliers, Wahoos
- NCAA: Division I (FBS)
- Conference: Atlantic Coast Conference (Note: Virginia Caveliers Squash is part of the College Squash Association.)
- Athletic director: Carla Williams
- Location: Charlottesville, Virginia
- Varsity teams: 27 (13 men's, 14 women's)
- Football stadium: Scott Stadium
- Basketball arena: John Paul Jones Arena
- Baseball stadium: Davenport Field at Disharoon Park
- Softball stadium: Palmer Park
- Soccer stadium: Klöckner Stadium
- Aquatics center: Aquatic & Fitness Center
- Lacrosse stadium: Klöckner Stadium
- Other venues: Lannigan Field; Memorial Gymnasium; Sheridan Snyder Tennis Center; University Hall; University Hall Turf Field; McArthur Squash Center
- Colors: Orange and blue
- Mascot: Cavalier (CavMan)
- Fight song: The Cavalier Song
- Website: virginiasports.com

Atlantic Coast Conference logo in Virginia's colors

The Virginia Cavaliers, nicknamed the Wahoos, are the athletic teams representing the University of Virginia, located in Charlottesville. The Cavaliers compete at the NCAA Division I level (FBS for football), in the Atlantic Coast Conference since 1953. Known simply as Virginia or UVA in sports media, the athletics program has twice won the Capital One Cup for men's sports (in 2015 and 2019) after leading the nation in overall athletic excellence in those years. The Cavaliers have regularly placed among the nation's Top 5 athletics programs.

Virginia leads the ACC with 24 NCAA Championships in men's sports. The program has added 13 NCAA titles in women's sports for a grand total of 37 NCAA titles, second overall in this major conference of fifteen programs. In "revenue sports", Virginia men's basketball won the NCAA tournament championship in 2019, won ACC tournaments in 1976, in 2014 and in 2018, and have finished first in the ACC standings 11 times. College Football Hall of Fame coach George Welsh retired with the most wins in ACC history (as of 2025, he places second (Note: to Bobby Bowden)) after leading Virginia football for nineteen years.

Other prominent NCAA Championship winning programs include Virginia men's lacrosse (9 national titles including 7 NCAA Championships), Virginia men's soccer (7 NCAA Championships), Virginia men's tennis (159–0 ACC win streak from 2006 to 2016; 2013, 2022, 2023, 2026 and "three-peat" 2015–2017 NCAA Championships), and Virginia baseball (winners of the 2015 College World Series). Virginia women's rowing has added two recent NCAA Championships (2010 and 2012) while Virginia women's lacrosse won NCAA Championships in 1991, 1993, and 2004. Women's cross country won repeat NCAA Championships in 1981 and 1982. Virginia men's lacrosse repeated in 2019 and 2021 (the 2020 session being cancelled due to COVID) and Virginia women's swimming and diving won multiple consecutive NCAA championships with a 2021–2026 “six-peat". Non-NCAA national championships include six national titles in indoor men's tennis, two USILA titles in men's lacrosse, and one AIAW title in women's indoor track and field. UVA men's boxing was a leading collegiate program when boxing was a major national sport in the first half of the 20th century, completing four consecutive undefeated seasons between 1932 and 1936, and winning an NCAA Championship in 1938.

The Cavalier mascot represents a mounted swordsman, and there are crossed swords or sabres in the official logo. Another moniker, the "Wahoos", or "Hoos" for short, based on the university's rallying cry "Wah-hoo-wah!" is also commonly used. Though originally only used by the student body, both terms—“Wahoos” and “Hoos”—have come into widespread usage with the local media as well.

== Origins and history ==
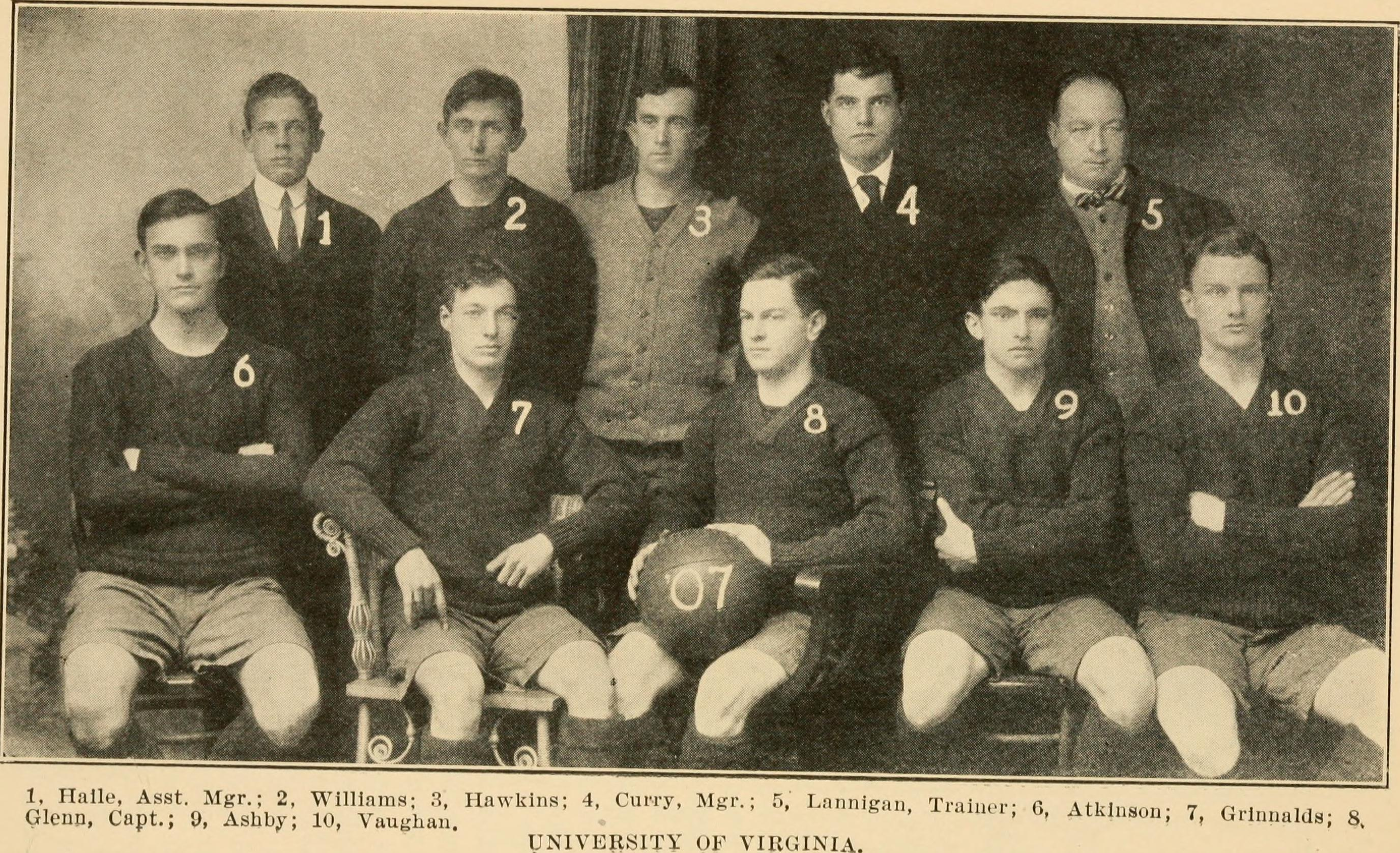
University of Virginia men's basketball team in 1894

The school colors, adopted in 1888, are orange and navy blue. The athletic teams had previously worn grey and cardinal red but those colors did not show up very well on dirty football fields as the school was sporting its first team. A mass meeting of the student body was called, and a star player showed up wearing a navy blue and orange scarf he had brought back from a University of Oxford summer rowing expedition. The colors were chosen when another student pulled the scarf from the player's neck, waved it to the crowd and yelled: "How will this do?" (Exactly 100 years later in 1988, Oxford named their own American football club the "Cavaliers," and soon after the Virginia team adopted its "curved sabres" logo in 1994, the Oxford team followed suit.)

The team's name was selected in reference to the historical Virginia Cavaliers, Royalists of the English Civil War said to have fled to the Colony of Virginia for protection.

Pop Lannigan was one of the "most noted athletic trainers in the East" during his tenure at Virginia from 1900 until his death in 1930. He came to the University of Virginia after previously serving as a trainer at Cornell University for 14 years. During his early years at Virginia he founded the college basketball and college boxing programs, and in track and field trained the "Arkansas Flash" James Rector to within six inches of winning the 100 meter dash at the 1908 Olympics (with a time of 10.9 seconds) while still a UVA student. When boxing was a major collegiate sport, Virginia's teams boxed in Memorial Gymnasium and after Lannigan's sudden death managed to go undefeated for a six-year run between 1932 and 1937, winning the NCAA Championship in 1938.

On December 4, 1953, the University of Virginia joined the Atlantic Coast Conference as the league's eighth member. Its men's basketball team won its first NCAA Championship in 2019. The baseball team won the College World Series in 2015 and has appeared in the CWS five times (2009, 2011, 2014, 2015, 2021). The men's lacrosse team has won nine national titles (1952, 1970, 1972, 1999, 2003, 2006, 2011, 2019, 2021), while the women have claimed three (1991, 1993, 2004). The football team has twice been honored as ACC co-champions (1989 and 1995). The men's soccer team has won seven NCAA Championships, four consecutively (1989, 1991–1994, 2009, 2014). Women's swimming and diving won its first NCAA Championship in 2021 and repeated in 2022, 2023, 2024, 2025, and 2026. Women's cross country won national titles in 1981 and 1982. The men's tennis team won NCAA Championships in 2013, 2015, 2016, 2017, 2022, and 2023.

In both 2015 and 2019, the University of Virginia and Stanford University were honored for fielding the nation's top athletics programs for NCAA men's and women's sports, respectively, by virtue of winning the Capital One Cup.

=== Mascot ===
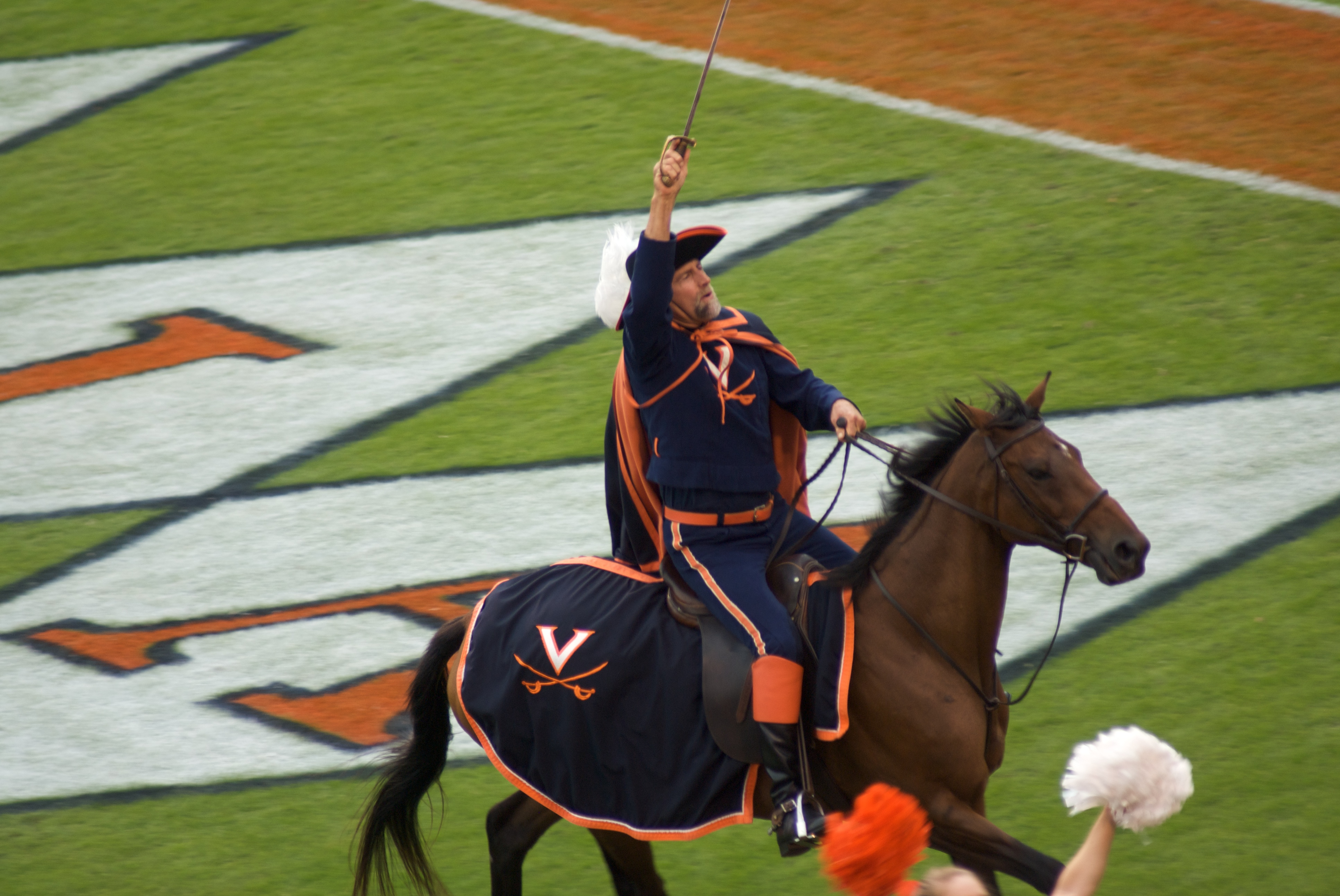
The "Cav Man" on horseback, 2009

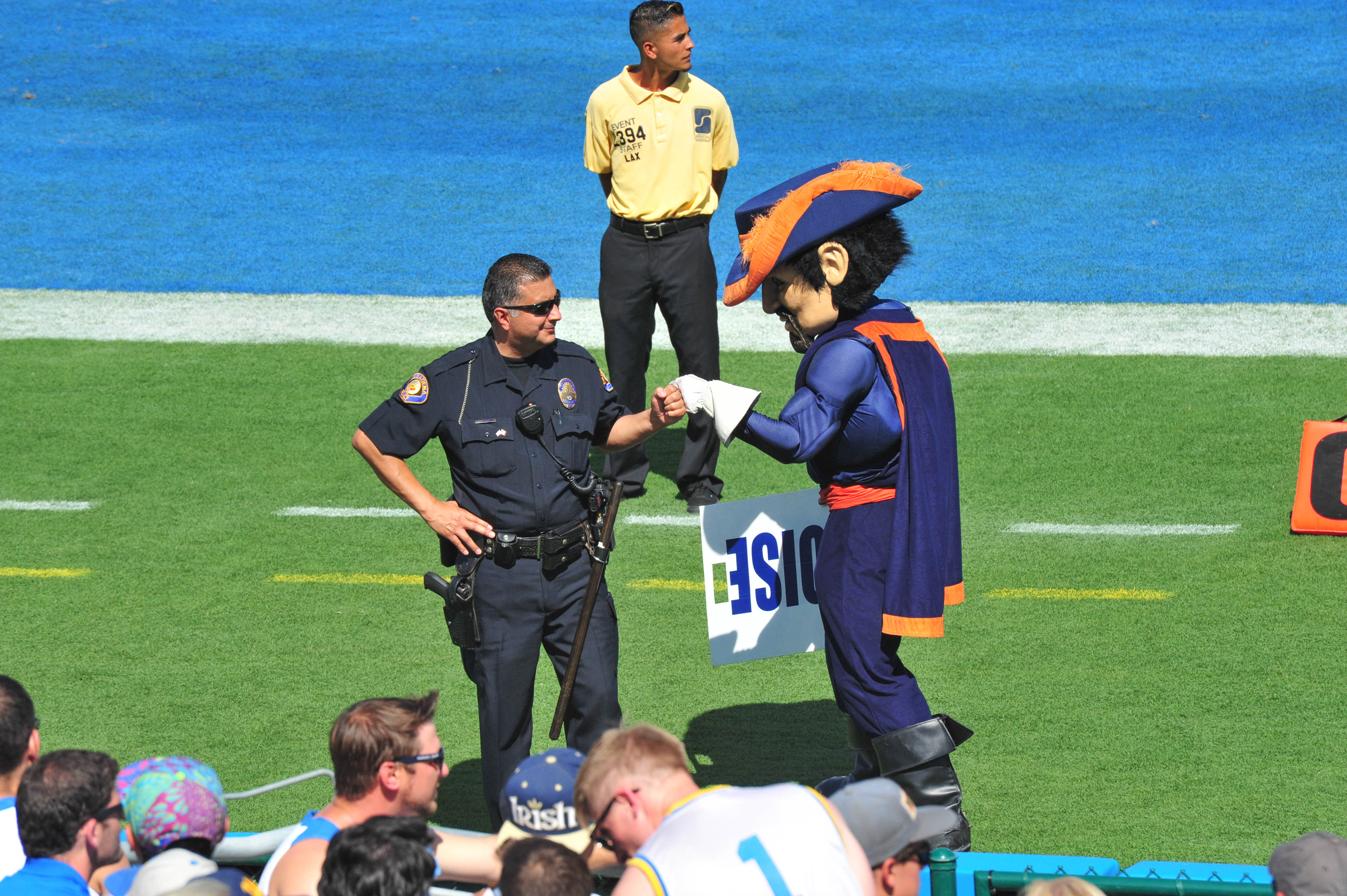
The Cav Man as a modern full-body suit performer, 2015

The team's eponymous mascot, known informally as the Cav Man, is a fanciful depiction of a swashbuckling Virginia Cavalier as popularized in the Cavalier fiction of the Antebellum South, armed with a sword and dressed in an orange and navy cloak and plumed hat.

=== Fight song ===
The Cavalier Song is the University of Virginia's fight song. The song was a result of a contest held in 1923 by the university. The Cavalier Song, with lyrics by Lawrence Haywood Lee, Jr., and music by Fulton Lewis, Jr., was selected as the winner. Generally the second half of the song is played during sporting events. The Good Ole Song dates to 1893 and, though not a fight song, is the de facto alma mater. It is set to the music of Auld Lang Syne and is sung after each victory in every sport, and after each touchdown in football.

== Sports sponsored ==
Men's sports	Women's sports
Baseball	Basketball
Basketball	Cross country
Cross country	Field hockey
Football	Golf
Golf	Lacrosse
Lacrosse	Rowing
Soccer	Soccer
Squash	Softball
Swimming & diving	Squash
Tennis	Swimming and diving
Track and field^{†}	Tennis
Wrestling	Track and field^{†}
	Volleyball
† – Track and field includes both indoor and outdoor

=== Basketball ===
After partial funding from benefactor Paul Tudor Jones with naming rights, John Paul Jones Arena opened in the Fall of 2006 and is the current venue for the men's and women's basketball teams. JPJ is the largest ACC arena outside of major metropolitan areas and the fifth-largest (of 15) in the conference overall. The men's team won the NCAA Championship in 2019 and the women's team finished as Runners-Up in 1990. The men's program is one of only two (with Kentucky) to have earned a No. 1 seed in all four regions of the NCAA tournament. (Note: First attaining the No. 1 seed in the East in 1981, No. 1 in the South in 1982, No. 1 in the West in 1983, and No. 1 in the Midwest in 2016.) The Cavaliers have been ranked in the Top 5 of the AP Poll a total of 96 times in the past four decades, ranking the program 9th since 1980. In the 18-game era (2012–2019) of ACC play Virginia had four of the five teams to go 16–2 or better. UVA was also the only ACC program to finish a season 17–1 (none went undefeated). Men's coach Tony Bennett has won the prestigious Henry Iba Award three times, second only to legend John Wooden.

=== Football ===
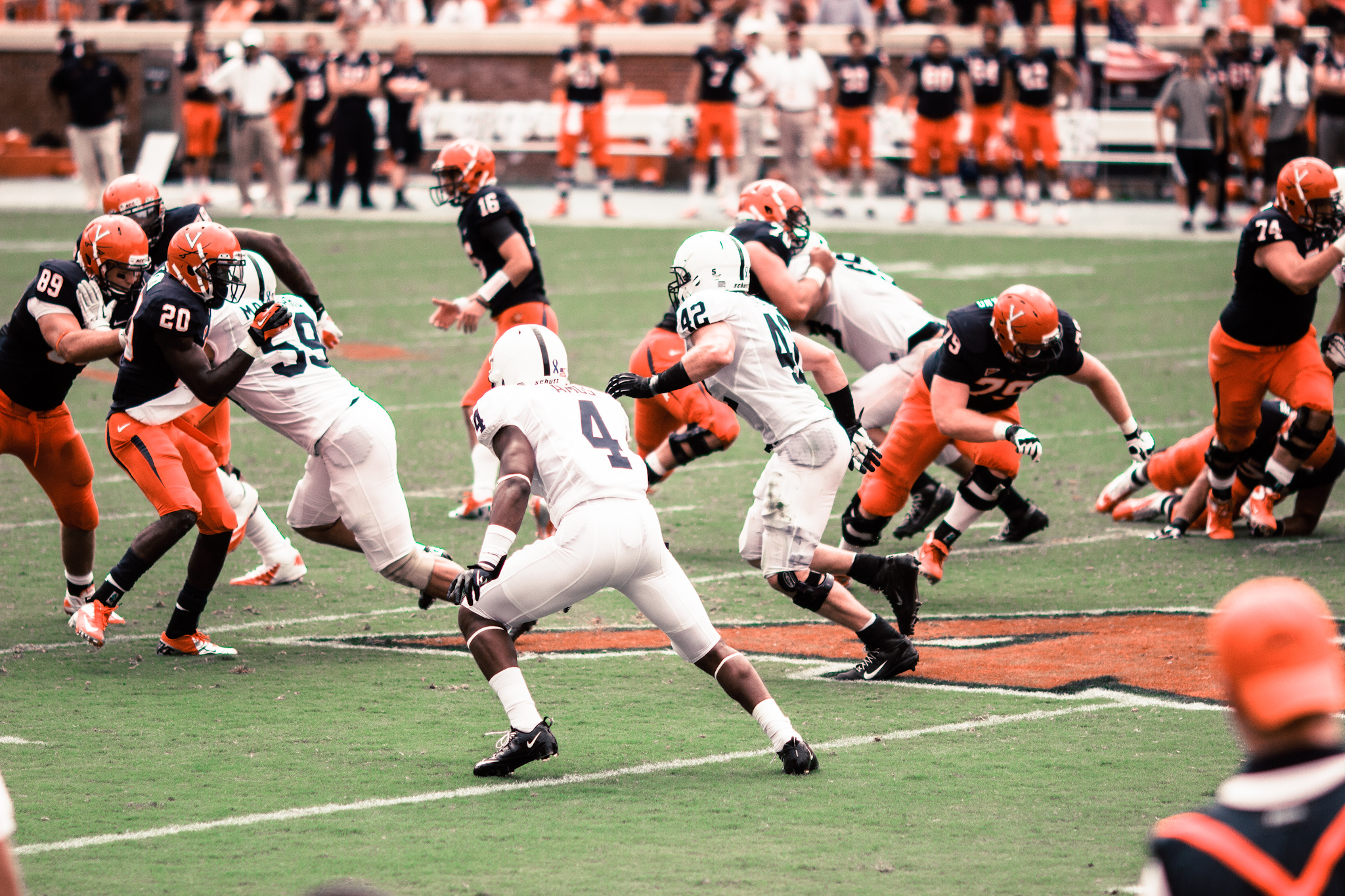
The Cavaliers play against the Penn State Nittany Lions in 2012 in Scott Stadium.

Scott Stadium sits across from the first-year dorms along Alderman Road and is home to the University of Virginia's football program.

The press box at Scott Stadium was a gift from an alumnus in honor of Norton G. Pritchett, the admired athletic director at UVA from 1934 until his death in 1950. Funding from benefactor Hunter Smith created the foundation for the 320-piece Cavalier Marching Band in 2004, replacing the Virginia Pep Band at athletic events.

The late Cavalier head coach George Welsh is a member of the College Football Hall of Fame and retired as the winningest head coach in ACC history.

The current head coach is Tony Elliott, who replaced Bronco Mendenhall in December 2021.

=== Baseball ===
With the departure of head coach Dennis Womack to the front office, the arrival of head coach Brian O'Connor from Notre Dame in 2004, and the opening of Davenport Field in 2002, the UVA baseball team experienced a rebirth. Since the inception of baseball at the university in 1889, the team has reached the NCAA baseball tournament nineteen times, once each of the past three decades (1972, 1985, 1996), but most recently fourteen years running (2004–2017) and again in 2021 and 2022. The 2009 season of the Cavaliers saw them through to the CWS (College World Series) with a 49-15-1 record. The team made a return trip to Omaha two years later in 2011, where they lost to eventual national champion South Carolina in the semi-final round. In 2014, the team made a third trip to the CWS, beat Ole Miss and TCU to advance to their first ever CWS finals, but lost the three-game series to Vanderbilt 2–1. The following year, both they and Vanderbilt returned to the CWS finals in a rematch. On June 24, 2015, Virginia won in three games for their first NCAA championship in baseball and the first ACC team to win since 1955.

=== Soccer ===
Klöckner Stadium is home to several successful programs, including Virginia men's and women's soccer. Since ACC Tournament play began in 1987, Virginia has played in 21 out of 33 ACC Tournament championship matches, winning eleven ACC titles, to go with their seven NCAA tournament championships (1989, 1991, 1992, 1993, 1994, 2009, 2014). Head Coach Bruce Arena compiled a 295–58–32 record before leaving in 1995 to coach D.C. United to their first two Major League Soccer championship seasons, and later the United States to their best FIFA World Cup showing since 1930.

The women's soccer team has produced three FIFA Women's World Cup winners for the U.S. women's national team, Morgan Brian (2015 and 2019) Emily Sonnett (2019) and Becky Sauerbrunn (both 2015 and 2019), and three Olympic gold medal winners, Sauerbrunn (2012), Angela Hucles (2004 and 2008), and Sonnett (2024).

=== Lacrosse ===
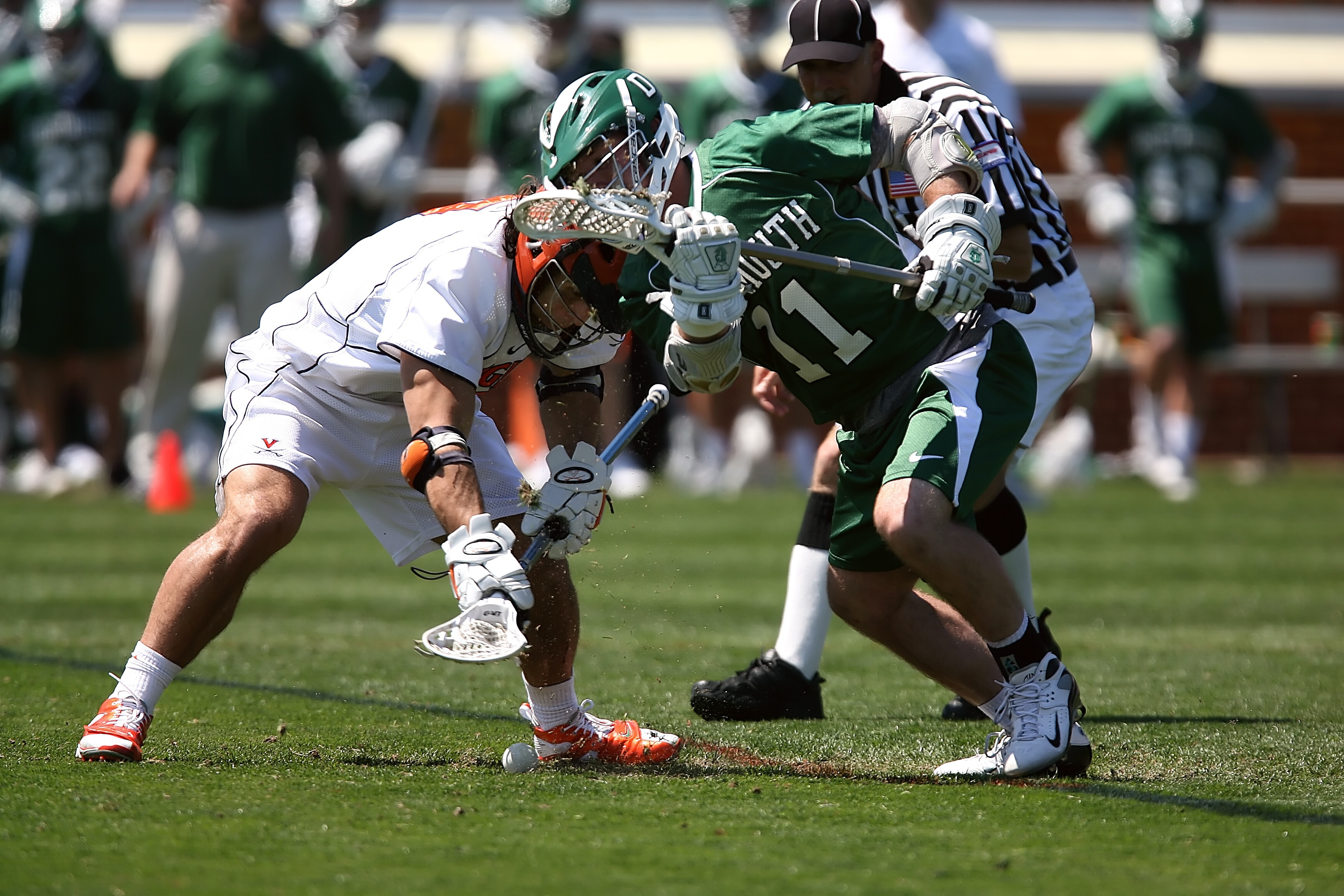
A 2009 matchup between the Cavaliers men's lacrosse team and Dartmouth Big Green men's lacrosse

The men's and women's lacrosse teams play their home games at Klöckner Stadium, or occasionally Turf Field or Scott Stadium. The men's program has won nine national championships (two pre-NCAA titles in 1952 and 1970 and seven NCAA titles in 1972, 1999, 2003, 2006, 2011, 2019 and 2021) and the women's program has won three national championships (in 1991, 1993, and 2004).

The 2006 lacrosse season was noteworthy for the men's team as it established the best record in NCAA history with a perfect 17–0 season en route to winning the 2006 national championship. On the season, the team won its games by an average of more than eight goals per game and drew comparisons to some of the best lacrosse teams of all time. Senior attackman Matt Ward won the Tewaaraton Trophy as the nation's best player, was selected as a First Team All-American and the USILA Player of the Year, and was named the Final Four MVP. He also broke the record for the most goals in the NCAA tournament with 16 goals (previously held by Gary Gait with 15). Eight Cavaliers were named All-Americans—three on the First Team, three on the Second Team, and two on the Third Team. Five Cavaliers were selected in the 2006 Major League Lacrosse Collegiate Draft. Matt Ward, Kyle Dixon, and Michael Culver were selected in the first round, Matt Poskay in the second, and J.J. Morrissey in the third.

On March 28, 2009, the men's team played in the longest game in the history of NCAA Division I lacrosse—a 10–9 victory over Maryland in seven overtime periods.

=== Softball ===
The Cavaliers softball team began play in 1980. The team has made two NCAA tournament appearances in 2010 and 2024. The current head coach is Joanna Hardin.

=== Squash ===
On June 30, 2017, Virginia promoted their men's and women's club squash teams to varsity status. In doing so, the Cavaliers became the first Power Five program to sponsor men's squash, and only the second Power Five women's team (after Stanford). In only their 3rd varsity season the men's team finished 5th in the country and won the inaugural Mid-Atlantic Squash Conference championship.

=== Swimming and diving ===
The women's swimming and diving team won the NCAA Championship in 2021, 2022, 2023, 2024 ,2025 and 2026.The men's swimming and diving team has won 16 ACC championships and the women's team has won 22 including 7 in a row .

=== Tennis ===
The men's tennis team rose to prominence in the 21st century under coach Brian Boland. The team won its first ACC regular season and tournament championships in 2004 and lost to Southern California in the NCAA final in 2011 and 2012. Behind standouts Jarmere Jenkins and Alex Domijan, the team won its first NCAA championship in 2013, defeating UCLA in the finals. The Cavaliers won three consecutive NCAA championships from 2015 to 2017, defeating Oklahoma for the first two and North Carolina for the third. Virginia added back to back NCAA titles in 2022 and 2023, defeating Kentucky and Ohio State in the final matches, respectively. Virginia also won the ITA national indoor tennis championship in 2008, 2009, 2010, 2011 and 2013.

Several Virginia players have won individual national championships. Somdev Devvarman won in 2007 and 2008, while Ryan Shane won in 2015 and Thai-Son Kwiatkowski won in 2017. Michael Shabaz won the NCAA doubles championship in 2009 (with Dominic Inglot) and 2010 (with Drew Courtney), and Jenkins and Mac Styslinger won the doubles title in 2013. Mans Dahlberg and Dylan Dietrich won the 2025 NCAA men's doubles championship in the fall of the 2025-2026 year.

On the women's side, Danielle Collins won the NCAA singles championship in 2014 and 2016, and Emma Navarro won in 2021. The teams won the ACC Tournament in 2014 and 2015. The team went 12-0 in ACC regular season play in 2026 to win its first outright regular season title.

=== Cross country ===
The men's and women's cross country teams race at Panorama Farms, located six miles from Grounds at the University of Virginia. It was the site of the 2006 and 2007 ACC Cross Country Championships. The men's team dates back to 1954 when they placed 4th at the ACC championships. The women's team won the NCAA national championships in 1981 and 1982 and won the ACC championships in 1982 and in 2015.

=== Golf ===
Dixon Brooke won the NCAA Golf Championship in 1940. Several golfers have played professionally on the PGA Tour including James Driscoll, Ben Kohles, Steve Marino, and Denny McCarthy. Virginia made it to the national championship match in 2025, where they fell to Oklahoma State, 4–1.

From the women's team, recent players on the LPGA Tour have included Brittany Altomare and Elizabeth Szokol.

=== Wrestling ===
The first University of Virginia head coach was Bobby Mainfort, back in 1921. Former Cavalier All-American Steve Garland has been the head wrestling coach at Virginia since the 2006–2007 season. Garland is the winner of the 2010 ACC Coach of the Year Award. In the 2009–2010 wrestling season Garland led the Cavaliers to 1st place in the ACC and a 15th-place finish at the NCAA championships. Virginia won its fifth ACC title in 2015. The wrestling team has produced four ACC runners-up during its program history.

Thanks to an anonymous donation of $1.5 million, Memorial Gymnasium received a full renovation in 2005.

== Notable non-varsity sports ==
=== Rugby ===
Virginia rugby competes in Division 1 in the Atlantic Coast Rugby League, which is composed of schools mostly from the Atlantic Coast Conference. Virginia also competes in the annual Atlantic Coast Invitational tournament, which Virginia won in 2008. Virginia also participates in an annual rivalry match against Virginia Tech for the Commonwealth Shield.

Virginia finished second in the ACI tournament in 2011, and again finished second in the 2012 ACI sevens tournament, losing to rival Virginia Tech by 33–31, and secured a place at the 2012 USA Rugby Sevens Collegiate National Championships.

=== Men's rowing ===
Men's rowing has won the American Collegiate Rowing Association national championship in 2011 and 2012. The national championship was canceled in 2021, but the biggest teams still raced at an unofficial championship in Oak Ridge, Tennessee. Men’s rowing won this competition.

== Leadership ==
From 2001 until 2017, the athletic director was Craig Littlepage, a former men's basketball head coach at the University of Pennsylvania and Rutgers University, who has held a variety of coaching and administrative titles at the University of Virginia. Following his retirement, former Georgia Bulldogs deputy athletic director Carla Williams was named as his replacement.

== Athletics apparel sponsorships ==
During the 1990s, the football team's uniforms were provided by Russell Athletic and Reebok, before Nike took over those responsibilities. During the early 2000s, the men's basketball team was outfitted by And1, making them just one of four teams in the nation to wear that brand and making the Cavaliers their de facto flagship program (much like Oregon's relationship with Nike and Maryland's relationship with Under Armour. In 2004, the basketball team joined the rest of their Cavalier brethren in wearing Nike. In 2015, UVA renewed their Nike commitment, signing a 10-year, $35 million deal that includes bonuses for nationally successful finishes in football, basketball, soccer, and lacrosse. The $3.5 million a year deal is the second-most lucrative Nike deal in the ACC after Florida State, and fourth overall behind North Carolina's deal with Jordan and Notre Dame's with Under Armour.

As of 2018, 24 of the 27 UVA sports teams are outfitted by Nike. One exception is the national powerhouse baseball program that currently serves as the flagship school for EvoShield. The others are the nationally relevant men's and women's swimming and diving programs that are currently outfitted by Arena USA.

== Radio network affiliates ==
Virginia Sports Radio Network Affiliates

City	Call Sign	Frequency
Blackstone	WKLV / W224DB	1440 AM / 92.7 FM
Charlottesville	WINA / W255CT	1070 AM / 98.9 FM
Charlottesville	WWWV	97.5 FM
Covington	WJVR-HD3 / W298BQ	101.9 FM-HD3 / 107.5 FM
Hampton Roads	WJFV	1650 AM
Lynchburg	WPLY / W298CN	1390 AM / 107.5 FM
Martinsville	WHEE	1370 AM
Richmond	WRVA / W241AP	1140 AM / 96.1 FM
Roanoke	WXLK-HD3 / W266CY	92.3 FM-HD3 / 101.1 FM
Tappahannock	WRAR-FM	105.5 FM
Washington, D.C.	WSBN	630 AM
Winchester	WINC / WINC-FM	1400 AM / 105.5 FM

WINA and WWWV are the network flagship stations. Affiliates broadcast football and men's basketball games, as well as a live coach's show for the in-season sport on Monday evenings. WKLV, WRAR and WWWV do not carry the coach's show. Richmond's WRVA is a 50,000-watt clear-channel station, bringing the Cavaliers' nighttime games to most of the eastern half of North America.

The network additionally produces selected baseball, women's basketball, and lacrosse games for broadcast on WINA and Internet streaming.

== Championships ==
=== NCAA team championships ===
Virginia teams have won 37 NCAA Championships.

- Men's (24)
  - Baseball (1): 2015
  - Basketball (1): 2019
  - Boxing (1): 1938
  - Lacrosse (7): 1972, 1999, 2003, 2006, 2011, 2019, 2021
  - Soccer (7): 1989, 1991, 1992, 1993, 1994, 2009, 2014
  - Tennis (7): 2013, 2015, 2016, 2017, 2022, 2023, 2026
- Women's (13)
  - Cross Country (2): 1981, 1982
  - Lacrosse (3): 1991, 1993, 2004
  - Rowing (2): 2010, 2012
  - Swimming and Diving (6): 2021, 2022, 2023, 2024, 2025, 2026
- see also:
  - ACC NCAA team championships
  - List of NCAA schools with the most NCAA Division I championships

=== Other national team championships ===
Below are 9 national team titles that were not awarded by the NCAA:

- Men's
  - Lacrosse (2): 1952, 1970
  - Indoor Tennis (6): 2008, 2009, 2010, 2011, 2013, 2017
- Women's:
  - AIAW Indoor Track (1): 1981
- see also:
  - List of NCAA schools with the most Division I national championships

=== Individual national championships ===
- Men's Tennis
  - Mans Dahlberg and Dylan Dietrich, doubles, 2025
  - Thai-Son Kwiatkowski, singles, 2017
  - Ryan Shane, singles, 2015
  - Somdev Devvarman, singles, 2008
  - Somdev Devvarman, singles, 2007
  - Jarmere Jenkins and Mac Styslinger, doubles, 2013
  - Drew Courtney and Michael Shabaz, doubles, 2010
  - Dominic Inglot and Michael Shabaz, doubles, 2009
- Men's Golf
  - Dixon Brooke, 1940
- Men's Track
  - Shane Cohen, outdoor 800 meters, 2024
  - Jordan Scott, indoor triple jump, 2019
  - Henry Wynne, indoor mile, 2016
  - Filip Mihaljevic, outdoor discus, 2017
  - Filip Mihaljevic, outdoor shot put, 2017
  - Filip Mihaljevic, outdoor shot put, 2016
  - Robby Andrews, outdoor 800 meters, 2011
  - Robby Andrews, indoor 800 meters, 2010
  - Paul Ereng, indoor 800 meters, 1989
  - Paul Ereng, outdoor 800 meters, 1988 and 1989
- Men's Swimming & Diving
  - Matt McLean, 500-yard Freestyle, 2011
  - Ed Moses, 100-yard Breaststroke, 2000
  - Ed Moses, 200-yard Breaststroke, 2000
  - Shamek Pietucha, 200-yard Butterfly, 1999
- Women's Tennis
  - Elaine Chervinsky and Mélodie Collard, doubles, 2024-2025
  - Emma Navarro, singles, 2021
  - Danielle Collins, singles, 2016
  - Danielle Collins, singles, 2014
- Women's Cross Country
  - Lesley Welch, 1982
- Women's Track
  - Michaela Meyer, outdoor 800 meters, 2021
- Women's Swimming & Diving
  - Claire Curzan, 100 back, 2026
  - Claire Curzan, 200 back,2026
  - Anna Moesch, 200 free, 2026
  - Claire Curzan, 100-Yard Backstroke, 2025
  - Claire Curzan, 200-Yard Backstroke, 2025
  - Alex Walsh, 100-Yard Breaststroke, 2025
  - Gretchen Walsh, 50-Yard Freestyle, 2025
  - Gretchen Walsh, 100-Yard Freestyle, 2025
  - Gretchen Walsh, 100-Yard Butterfly, 2025
  - Alex Walsh, 200-yard Individual Medley, 2024
  - Alex Walsh, 400-yard Individual Medley, 2024
  - Alex Walsh, 200-yard Breaststroke, 2024
  - Jasmine Nocentini, 100-yard Breaststroke, 2024
  - Gretchen Walsh, 50-Yard Freestyle, 2024
  - Gretchen Walsh, 100-Yard Freestyle, 2024
  - Gretchen Walsh, 100-Yard Freestyle, 2024
  - Kate Douglass, 200-Yard Individual Medley, 2023
  - Kate Douglass, 100-yard Butterfly, 2023
  - Kate Douglass, 200-yard Breaststroke, 2023
  - Alex Walsh, 400-yard Individual Medley, 2023
  - Gretchen Walsh, 100-Yard Backstroke, 2023
  - Gretchen Walsh, 100-Yard Freestyle, 2023
  - Kate Douglass, 50-yard Freestyle, 2022
  - Kate Douglass, 100-yard Butterfly, 2022
  - Kate Douglass, 200-yard Breaststroke, 2022
  - Alex Walsh, 200-yard Individual Medley, 2022
  - Alex Walsh, 400-yard Individual Medley, 2022
  - Alex Walsh, 200-yard Butterfly, 2022
  - Gretchen Walsh, 100-Yard Freestyle, 2022
  - Paige Madden, 200-yard Freestyle, 2021
  - Paige Madden, 500-yard Freestyle, 2021
  - Paige Madden, 1,650-yard Freestyle, 2021
  - Kate Douglass, 50-yard Freestyle, 2021
  - Alex Walsh, 200-yard Individual Medley, 2021
  - Leah Smith, 500-yard Freestyle, 2016
  - Leah Smith, 1,650-yard Freestyle, 2016
  - Leah Smith, 500-yard Freestyle, 2015
  - Leah Smith, 1,650-yard Freestyle, 2015
  - Cara Lane, 1,650-yard Freestyle, 2001
  - Cara Lane, 1,500-meter Freestyle, 2000

=== Atlantic Coast Conference championships ===
- Men's: (89)
  - Baseball (4): 1972, 1996, 2009, 2011
  - Basketball (3): 1976, 2014, 2018
  - Cross Country (5): 1984, 2005, 2007, 2008, 2025
  - Football (2): 1989 (co-champions), 1995 (co-champions)
  - Golf (1): 2025
  - Lacrosse (19): 1962, 1964, 1969, 1970, 1971, 1975, 1980, 1983, 1984, 1985, 1986, 1997, 1999, 2000, 2003, 2006, 2010, 2019, 2022
  - Outdoor Track & Field (3): 2009, 2024, 2026
  - Soccer (16): 1969, 1970, 1983, 1984, 1986, 1988, 1991, 1992, 1993, 1994, 1995, 1997, 2003, 2004, 2009, 2019
  - Swimming & Diving (16): 1987, 1990, 1999, 2000, 2001, 2002, 2003, 2004, 2005, 2006, 2008, 2009, 2010, 2011, 2012, 2013
  - Tennis (15): 2004, 2005, 2007, 2008, 2009, 2010, 2011, 2012, 2013, 2014, 2015, 2017, 2021, 2022, 2023
  - Wrestling (5): 1974, 1975, 1977, 2010, 2015
- Women's: (70)
  - Basketball (3): 1990, 1992, 1993
  - Cross Country (3): 1981, 1982, 2015
  - Field Hockey (1): 2016
  - Golf (2): 2015, 2016
  - Indoor Track & Field (1): 1987
  - Lacrosse (5): 1998, 2004, 2006, 2007, 2008
  - Outdoor Track & Field (6): 1983, 1984, 1985, 1986, 1987, 2025
  - Rowing (22): 2000, 2001, 2002, 2003, 2004, 2005, 2006, 2007, 2008, 2010, 2011, 2012, 2013, 2014, 2015, 2016, 2017, 2018, 2019, 2021, 2022, 2023
  - Soccer (2): 2004, 2012
  - Softball (1): 1994
  - Swimming & Diving (22): 1990, 1998, 1999, 2003, 2004, 2008, 2009, 2010, 2011, 2012, 2013, 2014, 2015, 2016, 2018, 2020, 2021, 2022, 2023, 2024, 2025, 2026
  - Tennis (2): 2014, 2015

== See also ==
- National Intercollegiate Women's Fencing Association
