= William Alexander (insurance writer) =

American author (1848–1937)

- Alexander c. 1916
- Born: 1848; New York
- Died: 1937 (aged 88–89)
- Education: University of Virginia
- Occupation: Author
- Known for: founder of Pi Kappa Alpha
- Spouse: Frances Gordon Paddock
- Parent: James Waddel Alexander
- Relatives: Archibald Alexander (paternal grandfather)

William Alexander (1848–1937) was an author of over ten works, over sixty-five year employee of The Equitable Life Assurance Society of the United States, and a founder of Pi Kappa Alpha.

== Biography ==
Alexander was born to theologian James Waddel Alexander on September 5, 1848. His paternal grandfather was Archibald Alexander, a preacher and theologian, President of Hampden-Sydney College and founder of Princeton Theological Seminary. William's mother was a member of the prestigious Cabell family who assisted Thomas Jefferson in the founding of the University of Virginia.

Although Alexander was born in New York, much of his childhood schooling was at a Virginia school. During the American Civil War he lived in England with his mother, as his father died in 1859.

While attending The University of Virginia he became the youngest of the six founders of Pi Kappa Alpha. Sunday evening March 1, 1868, William Alexander, Frederick Southgate Taylor, Littleton Waller Tazewell (Bradford), James Benjamin Sclater Jr., Julian Edward Wood, and Robertson Howard founded Pi Kappa Alpha at 47 West Range. Despite close contact with his uncle and three fellow fraternity founders all involved in medicine, Alexander sought to pursue the realm of business with Taylor and Tazewell.

Shortly after leaving the University of Virginia, Alexander was offered a temporary position with The Equitable Life Assurance Society of the United States, where his uncle, William Cowper Alexander, had served as first president. However the position became good for over sixty-five years once Alexander's drive and business capacity were realized. He gained positions of assistant secretary, and then company secretary. For over fifty years he oversaw the company as supervisor of publications, editor of periodicals, and the advertising in general. He wrote several histories of the company and was honored on many occasions for services rendered. He published over ten books, most of which dealt with life insurance, sales, or both.

The youngest and eldest of the original founders, Alexander preserved his interest of Pi Kappa Alpha, including its massive growth and success. He stayed involved with the fraternity, its founding, ritual, history, and current affairs. He published articles in the fraternity quarterly newsletter quite regularly.

Alexander married Frances Gordon Paddock in 1887 and they had a daughter. Frances died in 1931. He died at nearly ninety years old in 1937 and is buried in the Princeton Cemetery, Princeton, New Jersey.
