= 1859 New Jersey gubernatorial election =

- November 8, 1859
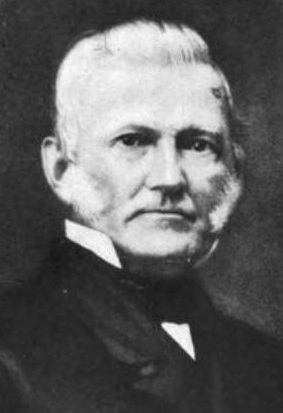

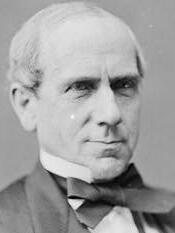
Nominee	Charles Smith Olden	Edwin R. V. Wright
Party	Opposition	Democratic
Alliance	Know-Nothing
Popular vote	53,315	51,714
Percentage	50.76%	49.24%
- County Results; Olden: 50–60% 60–70% Wright: 50–60%
Governor before election
William A. Newell
Opposition Party (Northern U.S.)
Elected Governor
Charles Smith Olden
Opposition Party (Northern U.S.)

The 1859 New Jersey gubernatorial election was held on November 8, 1859. Opposition Party nominee Charles Smith Olden defeated Democratic nominee Edwin R. V. Wright with 50.76% of the vote.

== Democratic nomination ==
=== Candidates ===
- Thomas H. Herring, state senator from Bergen County and president of the New Jersey Senate
- Joseph E. Potts, former state senator from Atlantic County
- Charles Sitgreaves, former state senator from Warren County
- Charles Skelton, former U.S. Representative from Trenton
- Garrett Sykes
- Alexander Wertz
- Edwin R.V. Wright, former mayor of Hudson City and Hudson County prosecutor

=== Convention ===
The Democratic Party held a convention in Trenton on August 24. Entering the convention, the leading candidates were Edwin R.V. Wright, Charles Skelton, Alexander Wertz, and Garrett Sykes.

At the start of the convention, there were many disputes between delegations over the Lecompton Constitution; Lecomptonites outnumbered opponents four-to-one. A lengthy dispute between rival delegations from Sussex, split over the Lecompton question, resulted in neither delegation being seated.

Names were placed in nomination for Governor, including Wright, Skelton, Wertz, Sykes, joined by Charles Sitgreaves, Joseph Potts, and Thomas H. Herring. Before balloting began, the Party adopted a platform embracing the Buchanan administration and opposing any attempt by Congress to regulate slavery in the territories. The party also denounced any attempt to revive the Atlantic slave trade.

Balloting commenced, with Wright taking a strong plurality on the first ballot and extending his lead on the second. After the Sussex delegates failed to reach an agreement, there was a motion to exclude their votes entirely, causing a lengthy delay as the convention recessed.

After the convention was recalled to order, balloting restarted, Wright maintaining his large plurality. Herring's name was also withdrawn. On the fifth ballot, it became clear Wright had a majority. Many delegations switched their votes to make his nomination unanimous.

1859 Democratic Convention
Ballot	1	2	3	4	5 (Note: Before shifts.)	5 (Note: After shifts.)
Wright	193	203	240	290	248	388
Skelton	82	103	114	124	120	-
Herring	54	54	40	28	0	-
Wertz	86	88	76	28	90	-
Sykes	7	13	11	11	11	-
Potts	7	0	2	2	2	-
Sitgreaves	29	1	-	-	-	-
Scattering	35	0	6	9	19	-
Total	493	462	489	492	493	388

Wright was notified of his victory and appeared at the convention to make an acceptance speech.

== Opposition nomination ==
=== Candidates ===
- Andrew K. Hay, businessman and former Whig U.S. Representative from Winslow Township
- William K. McDonald (Note: Spelled alternatively as "McDonnell.")
- Ephraim Marsh, former state senator from Morris County
- Charles Smith Olden, former Whig state senator from Mercer County
- Joseph W. Porter

==== Withdrew at convention ====
- Joseph W. Allen, former state senator from Burlington County (before balloting)
- Dudley S. Gregory, former Whig U.S. Representative and Mayor of Jersey City (during first ballot)
- Edward Y. Rogers, former state senator from Middlesex County (after second ballot)

=== Convention ===
Once again, elements opposed to the incumbent Democratic administration in Washington joined together to present a candidate for Governor. Upon a public call by opposition legislators, they met at Temperance Hall in Trenton on September 7. The plurality of the convention were Know-Nothings, joined by a large number of Republicans and a significant minority of Democrats opposed to the Lecompton Constitution.

Charles Smith Olden, Joseph W. Allen, Joseph W. Porter, Andrew K. Hay, William K. McDonald, (Note: Spelled alternatively as "McDonnell.") Ephraim Marsh, Edward Y. Rogers, and Dudley S. Gregory were nominated. Before balloting began, Allen's name was withdrawn. On the first ballot, Smith led. Gregory's name was withdrawn by his request. After the second ballot, Olden led by a larger margin and Rogers's name was withdrawn. A motion was made to nominate Olden by acclamation, but it was shouted down. On the third ballot, Olden received a majority, and his nomination was made unanimous by acclamation.

Some hesitation ensued after a delegate announced that the American convention, meeting elsewhere in Trenton, had nominated Peter Clarke, thus splitting the opposition. However, word soon came that the Americans had nominated Olden as well, and the convention concluded with speeches made in favor of the candidate.

1859 Opposition Convention
Ballot	1	2	3
Olden	183	241	296
Marsh	89	112	104
McDonald	79	91	92
Gregory	68	0	0
Hay	66	62	53
Porter	64	42	18
Rogers	47	14	0
Total	596	562	563

The convention adopted a moderate platform that was nearly silent on the issue of slavery, except that it opposed any effort to revive the Atlantic slave trade. It endorsed a protective tariff and denounced the Buchanan administration as corrupt, extravagant, and oppressive of free speech and thought.

=== American Party convention ===
The American Party met simultaneous to the Opposition convention at the Trenton Atheneum. During the first ballot for Governor, word arrived that the Opposition convention had nominated Olden. On the first ballot, the Americans nominated Olden by 96 votes against 35 for Peter J. Clarke.

== General election ==
=== Candidates ===
- Charles Smith Olden, former state senator from Mercer County (Opposition and American)
- Edwin R. V. Wright, former mayor of Hudson City and Hudson County prosecutor (Democratic)

=== Results ===
New Jersey gubernatorial election, 1859
Party	Candidate	Votes	%	±%
Opposition	Charles Smith Olden	53,315	50.76%	
Democratic	Edwin R. V. Wright	51,714	49.24%	
Majority				
Turnout				
Opposition hold		Swing		
