= Archibald Alexander =

American theologian (1772–1851)

The Reverend Archibald Alexander
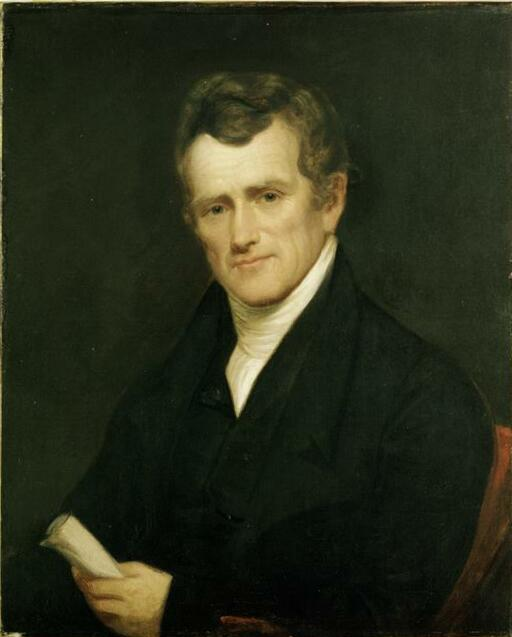
- portrait by Bass Otis

1st Principal of Princeton Theological Seminary
- In office August 12, 1812 – October 22, 1851
- Preceded by: Inaugural holder
- Succeeded by: Charles Hodge

3rd President of Hampden–Sydney College
- In office May 31, 1797 – November 13, 1806
- Preceded by: Drury Lacy (Acting)
- Succeeded by: William S. Reid (Acting)

Personal details
- Born: April 17, 1772 South River, Rockbridge, Virginia
- Died: October 22, 1851 (aged 79) Princeton Township, New Jersey
- Spouse: Janetta Waddel (after 1802)
- Children: James Waddel Alexander; William Cowper Alexander; Joseph Addison Alexander
- Education: Washington & Lee (A.B.); Princeton University (D.D.)

Archibald Alexander (April 17, 1772 – October 22, 1851) was an American Presbyterian theologian and professor at the Princeton Theological Seminary. He served for 9 years as the President of Hampden–Sydney College in Virginia and for 39 years as Princeton Theological Seminary's first professor from 1812 to 1851.

== Early life ==
Archibald Alexander was born at South River, Rockbridge County, Virginia, on April 17, 1772, son of William Alexander, a farmer of means. He was raised under the tuition and ministry of Presbyterian minister William Graham (1745–1799), a man who had been trained in theology by John Witherspoon.

His grandfather, of Scottish descent, came from Ireland to Pennsylvania in 1736, and after a residence of two years removed to Virginia. William, father of Archibald, was a farmer and trader. His nephew was the American novelist William Alexander Caruthers (1802–1846).

At the age of ten Archibald was sent to the academy of William Graham at Timber Ridge meetinghouse (since developed into Washington and Lee University), at Lexington. At the age of seventeen he became a tutor in the family of General Thomas Posey, of The Wilderness, twelve miles west of Fredericksburg, but after a few months resumed his studies with his former teacher. At this time a remarkable movement, still spoken of as "the great revival," influenced his mind and he turned his attention to the study of divinity.

== Career ==
On October 1, 1791, he was licensed to preach, ordained by the presbytery of Hanover on June 9, 1794, and for seven years was an itinerant pastor in Charlotte and Prince Edward counties.

By the time he was 21, Alexander was a preacher of the Presbyterian Church. He was appointed the president of Hampden–Sydney College, where he served from 1797 until a revolt among the students forced him to retire in 1806, and from 1807 to 1812 he was acted as pastor of the Old Pine street Presbyterian Church of Philadelphia.

The Princeton Theological Seminary was established at Princeton, New Jersey in 1812 and Alexander was appointed its first professor, inaugurated on August 12, 1812. In 1824, he helped to found the Chi Phi Society along with Robert Baird and Charles Hodge. In 1843, he returned to Washington College to deliver an alumni address, which was one of his many publications.

Alexander was one of the earliest supporters of the American Colonization Society that arranged the emigration of free Black and enslaved Black Americans to Liberia. In 1827, he and his close friend Samuel Miller defended the organization's mission against attacks by John Brown Russwurm in Russwurm's paper, Freedom's Journal. He later served as the Colonization Society's vice president and wrote the most comprehensive history of the movement written before the twentieth century, A History of Colonization on the Western Coast of Africa (1846).

Samuel Miller became the second professor at the seminary and for 37 years Alexander and Miller were considered together as pillars of the Presbyterian Church in maintaining its doctrines. Charles Hodge, a famous student and successor of Alexander, named his son Archibald Alexander Hodge after his mentor.

=== Archival collections ===
The Presbyterian Historical Society in Philadelphia, Pennsylvania has a collection of Archibald Alexander's personal papers dating from 1819 to 1851 including outgoing correspondence, manuscript articles and lecture notes.

== Personal life ==
On April 5, 1802, Alexander married Janetta Waddel, the daughter of a Presbyterian preacher, James Waddel (1739–1805), whose eloquence was described in William Wirt's Letters of a British Spy (1803). Together, they were the parents of:

- James Waddel Alexander (1804–1859), who was a Princeton graduate and Presbyterian minister. He wrote the life of his father, and edited his posthumous works.
- William Cowper Alexander (1806–1874), who served as president of the New Jersey State Senate and as the first president of the Equitable Life Assurance Society.
- Joseph Addison Alexander (1809–1860), who was a biblical scholar.
- Samuel Davies Alexander (1819-1894), a minister
- Henry Martyn Alexander (1822–1899), who was a lawyer and one of the Trustees of Princeton University.

Alexander died on October 22, 1851, at Princeton Township, New Jersey.

=== Descendants ===
His grandson, William C. Alexander (1848–1937), was an executive with the Equitable Life Assurance Society, author, and founder of Pi Kappa Alpha fraternity. His great-grandson, James Waddell Alexander II (1888–1971), was a noted mathematician and topologist.

== Works ==
- Christ's gracious invitation
- Biographical sketches of the founder, and principal alumni of the Log college : together with an account of the revivals of religion, under their ministry
- Outlines of moral science
- Love to an unseen saviour
- A history of the Israelitish nation, from their origin to their dispersion at the destruction of Jerusalem by the Romans
- A History of Colonization on the Western Coast of Africa (1846)
- An address to candidates for the ministry : on the importance of aiming at eminent piety in making their preparation for the sacred office
- Suggestions in vindication of Sunday-schools, but more especially for the improvement of Sunday-school books, and the enlargement of the plan of instruction
- The evidences of Christianity
- Thoughts on the education of pious and indigent candidates for the ministry
- Thoughts on religious experience
- Thoughts on religious experience' To which is added an appendix, containing "Letters to the aged," &c., &c
- A discourse occasioned by the burning of the theatre in the city of Richmond, Virginia, on the twenty-sixth of December, 1811. By which lawful calamity a large number of lives were lost. Delivered in the Third Presbyterian church, Philadelphia, on the eighth day of January, 1812, at the request of the Virginia students attached to the medical class in the University of Pennsylvania
- The canon of the Old and New Testaments ascertained
- The canon of the Old and New Testaments ascertained; or, The Bible, complete, without the Apocrypha and unwritten traditions (Entered, according to the Act of Congress, in the year 1851 by A.W. Mitchell in the office of the Clerk of the District Court for the Eastern District of Pennsylvania.)
- Evidences of the authenticity, inspiration and canonical authority of the Holy Scriptures
- Practical sermons to be read in families and social meetings
- Practical truths
- A brief compend of Bible truth
- A brief outline of the evidences of the Christian religion
- A dialogue between a Presbyterian and a "Friend"
- A Memorial of Mrs. Margaret Breckinridge
- Remarks on a paragraph in the Rev. Doctor Davidson's History of the Presbyterian Church in Kentucky : in reference to the character of the late Mr. John Lyle, ruling elder in the Timberridge Church, Virginia
- The way of salvation familiarly explained : in a conversation between a father and his children
- A pocket dictionary of the Holy Bible. Containing, a historical and geographical account of the persons and places mentioned in the Old and New Testaments: and also a description of other objects, natural, artificial, civil, religious, and military; together with a copious reference to texts of Scripture under each important word
- "Thomas Aquinas and the Encyclical Letter", The Princeton Review, 1: 245–261, January–June 1880
- "Reminiscences of Patrick Henry", Southern Literary Messenger, 16 (6): 366–368, June 1850

=== Sermons ===
- Alexander, Archibald (1829). "The Nature and Means of Growth in Grace". National Preacher. III (8). New-York: 113–121.
- Alexander, Archibald (1829). "Means of Growth in Grace". National Preacher. III (8). New-York: 121–128.

== Sources ==
- Alexander, Archibald (1851). "Personal papers from 1819 to 1851". Philadelphia, PA: Presbyterian Historical Society – via history.pcusa.org.
- Archivist (August 12, 2017). "Alexander Inaugurated at Princeton (1812)". This Day in Presbyterian History – via thisday.pcahistory.org.
- Benedetto, Robert (2010). Historical Dictionary of the Reformed Churches (2nd ed.). Blue Ridge Summit, PA: Rowman & Littlefield. pp. 6–7. ISBN 978-0-8108-7023-9.
- Carey, Patrick W.; Lienhard, Joseph T. (2000). Biographical Dictionary of Christian Theologians. Westport, CT: Greenwood Press. pp. 12–13. ISBN 978-0-313-03344-5.
- Chisholm, Hugh, ed. (1911). "Alexander, Archibald" . Encyclopædia Britannica (11th ed.). Cambridge University Press.
- Johnson, Rossiter, ed. (1906). "Alexander, Archibald". The Biographical Dictionary of America. Vol. 1. Boston: American Biographical Society. p. 74.
- Hurt, M. (February 6, 2014). "William Alexander Caruthers (1802–1846)". The Dictionary of Virginia Biography. Encyclopedia Virginia.
- James, Winston (2010). The Struggles of John Brown Russwurm. New York, NY: New York University Press. pp. 33–37. ISBN 978-0-8147-4289-1.
- Morrison, Alfred J. (1912). The College of Hampden–Sidney, Calendar of Board Minutes 1776-1876. Richmond, VA: Hermitage Press. pp. 47 & 61.
- Posey, John Thornton (1992). General Thomas Posey. Michigan State University Press. pp. 166–120.

Academic offices
Preceded by Drury Lacy	President of Hampden–Sydney College; 1797—1806	Succeeded by William S. Reid
New institution	Principal of The Theological; Seminary at Princeton, New Jersey; 1812–1840	Succeeded by Charles Hodge
