= 1856 New Jersey gubernatorial election =

- November 4, 1856
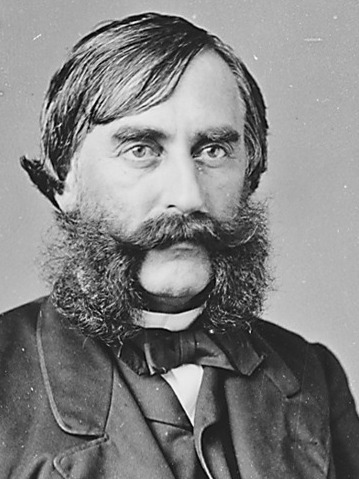

Nominee	William A. Newell	William Cowper Alexander
Party	Opposition	Democratic
Alliance	American; Republican
Popular vote	50,803	48,246
Percentage	51.29%	48.71%
- County Results; Newell: 50–60% 60–70% 70–80% Alexander: 50–60% 60–70%
Governor before election
Rodman M. Price
Democratic
Elected Governor
William A. Newell
Republican

The 1856 New Jersey gubernatorial election was held on November 4, 1856. William A. Newell, running on a fusion ticket opposed to the Franklin Pierce administration, defeated Democratic nominee William Cowper Alexander with 51.29% of the vote.

== Nominations ==
=== Fusion ===
A group of thirty-four legislators opposed to the administration of President Franklin Pierce called for a mass meeting to nominate an opposition candidate for Governor. On Wednesday, June 4 at Temperance Hall in Trenton, Whigs, Republicans, Know-Nothings, and Free-Soilers joined to nominate former U.S. Representative William A. Newell for Governor by acclamation. The meeting was presided over by William Dayton with William Pennington and Theodore Frelinghuysen among those in attendance.

Newell's nomination was later ratified at a meeting of Fillmore-Donelson supporters in Jersey City on July 9. He was also co-ratified by supporters of the Republican Fremont-Dayton ticket on July 11 in New Brunswick. Their resolution referred to Newell as the "opposition candidate."

=== Democratic ===
The Democratic Party met in Trenton on August 6 and nominated New Jersey Senate President William Cowper Alexander for Governor.

The names of John W. Fennimore, Joseph C. Potts, Edwin R. V. Wright, Joseph Kille, and Charles Skelton were also placed in nomination, though Skelton's name was immediately withdrawn by Philemon Dickinson. Wright's name was also withdrawn by his request, communicated to the convention by Edmund Charles. As voting continued and Alexander built a majority, the names of Fennimore, Potts, and Kille were also successively withdrawn, leaving Alexander as the convention's unanimous nominee.

== General election ==
=== Candidates ===
- William Cowper Alexander, State Senator from Mercer County (Democratic)
- William A. Newell, former U.S. Representative from Allentown (Opposition)

=== Results ===
New Jersey gubernatorial election, 1856
Party	Candidate	Votes	%	±%
Republican	William A. Newell	50,803	51.29%	+51.29%
Democratic	William Cowper Alexander	48,246	48.71%	−3.89%
Majority		2,457	2.58%	N/A
Turnout				
Republican gain from Democratic		Swing		
