= William Carruthers =

William Carruthers may refer to:

- William Carruthers (botanist) (1830–1922), British botanist
- Will Carruthers (born 1967), musician

== See also ==
- William Alexander Caruthers (1802–1846), American novelist
