= Littleton Waller Tazewell Bradford =

American politician (1848–1918)

Littleton Waller Tazewell
- Born: Littleton Waller Tazewell Bradford; July 16, 1848; Norfolk, Virginia, U.S.
- Died: July 15, 1918 (aged 69); Norfolk, Virginia, U.S.
- Burial place: Elmwood Cemetery (Norfolk, Virginia)
- Education: Virginia Military Institute; University of Virginia
- Known for: Founder of Pi Kappa Alpha

Littleton Waller Tazewell Bradford (July 16, 1848 – July 15, 1918) was a Virginia politician and was a co-founder of Pi Kappa Alpha fraternity.

== Early life ==
Littleton Waller Tazewell Bradford was born in Norfolk, Virginia in 1848 to Anne Elizabeth (née Tazewell) and Edmund Bradford. His father was a veteran and graduate of the United States Military Academy, originally from Philadelphia. Bradford grew up on his parents' estate in Princess Anne County. On his paternal side, he was a descendant of William Bradford. On his maternal side, he was a descendant of Henry Tazewell. His maternal grandfather was Littleton Waller Tazewell, former Governor of Virginia and former president pro tempore of the United States Senate.

Bradford was educated first at Norfolk Academy. He enrolled as a cadet at the Virginia Military Institute (V.M.I.) on February 6, 1865, and was assigned to the class of 1868. At the time, V.M.I.'s cadets were headquartered in Richmond, Virginia where they supported the defense of the Confederacy's capital. His cadetship lasted until April 1865, when the corps was disbanded as Federal troops moved on Richmond. The cadets were directed to escape the best way possible; Bradford escaped in a canal boat, taking refuge with relatives further up the James River.

After the war, Bradford attended the University of Virginia. He studied medicine and shared 47 West Range with his cousin, Frederick Southgate Taylor. Bradford and Taylor joined four others in founding the Pi Kappa Alpha fraternity on March 1, 1868. All six founders had been friends at V.M.I. However, he dropped out of college and entered business in Norfolk.

Bradford legally changed his surname to Tazewell, adopting the name of his maternal grandfather who had no male heir. This change was made after the death of his uncle John Tazewell in 1869.

== Career ==
Bradford, now known by the surname Tazewell, was active in business and civic life in Norfolk. For twenty years, he was on the Norfolk Common Council from the Third Ward. He served as its vice-president, chairman of the street committee, and as a member of the public parks committee. He was also a member of the Chamber of Commerce, serving on its fire committee which worked to lower insurance rates in Norfolk.

== Personal life ==
Tazewell married Mary Louise Walker on November 6, 1883. They had three children, Littleton Waller Tazewell Jr., Calvert Walke Tazewell, and Edmund Bradford Tazewell. They lived on Duke Street in Norfolk.

He was a founder and member of the Chesapeake Boat Club, where he assembled an all-Pi Kappa Alpha crew. He was a member of the Christ Episcopal Church in Norfolk and served on its vestry.

He died on July 15, 1918. He is interred in Elmwood Cemetery in Norfolk, near his cousin Frederick Southgate Taylor.
