= Margaret E. Breckinridge =

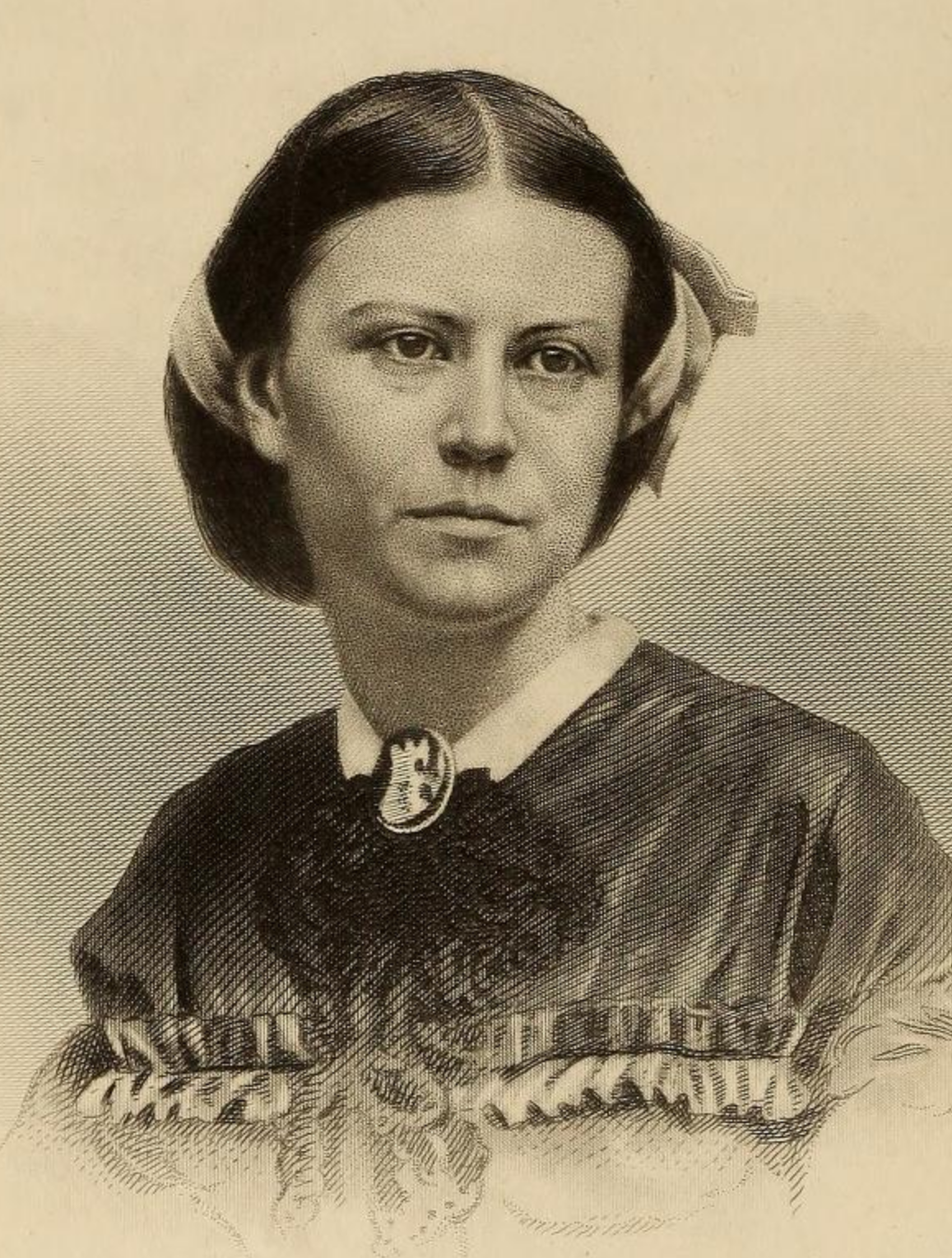
- Born: March 24, 1832; Philadelphia
- Died: July 27, 1864 (aged 32); Niagara Falls
- Occupation: Nurse
- Parent(s): John Breckinridge; Margaret Miller Breckinridge

Margaret Elizabeth Breckinridge (March 24, 1832 – July 27, 1864) was a Union (American Civil War) nurse during the American Civil War even though her family included a leading Confederate.

== Early life and education ==
Margaret Breckinridge was born on March 24, 1832 in Philadelphia. She was the daughter of John Breckinridge, a Presbyterian minister, and Margaret Miller. Her paternal grandfather, John Breckinridge, was United States Attorney General. Her mother died when she was six and her father when she was nine, so she was left to the care of her maternal grandparents, Samuel and Sarah Miller, in Princeton, New Jersey. Samuel Miller was a professor at Princeton Theological Seminary.

== Nursing career ==
At the state of the American Civil War, Breckinridge organized a Soldiers' Aid Society in Princeton to donate food and clothing to Union troops, but was determined to serve as a nurse. She began her volunteer service in April 1962 in hospitals in Baltimore, Maryland, but soon contracted measles. She travelled to the home of her cousin in Lexington, Kentucky, and after recovering, began working in hospitals in that city. Breckinridge was in Lexington during its Confederate occupation in September and October and her written accounts of the occupation have been preserved.

After the Confederate retreat from the city, Breckinridge served two month-long trips on Mississippi River hospital ships of the United States Sanitary Commission transporting wounded from Vicksburg, Mississippi to St. Louis, Missouri. Poor health and her recovery from typhoid fever prevented a third trip in March 1963. She spent some time recovering in Philadelphia and training at the Episcopal Hospital there.

Though her nursing career was short, it attracted a disproportionate amount of press attention due to the fact that her first cousin, John C. Breckinridge, was Confederate Secretary of War.

== Death ==
Breckinridge hoped to return to nursing service in Fredericksburg, Virginia in the spring of 1864, but her health prevented it. In June, her late sister's husband and first cousin, Peter A. Porter, was killed at the Battle of Cold Harbor. Breckinridge joined her family in Baltimore to accompany Porter's body back to his home in Niagara Falls, New York. There, she became ill again and died there on July 27, 1864, and was buried near her sister and brother-in-law in Oakwood Cemetery.
