= Frederick Southgate Taylor =

American politician (1847–1896)

Virginia House of Delegates
- In office 1874–1875
- In office 1890–1891

Personal details
- Born: December 16, 1847 Norfolk, Virginia, US
- Died: February 16, 1896 (aged 48) Norfolk, Virginia, US
- Resting place: Elmwood Cemetery, Norfolk, Virginia
- Party: Democratic
- Education: College of William & Mary, A.B. 1867; University of Virginia

Frederick Southgate Taylor (December 16, 1847 – February 16, 1896), was an American politician and businessman. He served two terms in the Virginia House of Delegates. Taylor is noted as a founder of Pi Kappa Alpha fraternity.

== Early life ==
Frederick Southgate Taylor was born in Norfolk, Virginia on December 16, 1847. His father was Tazewell Taylor, the bursar of the College of William & Mary and a lawyer in Norfolk. Taylor grew up in and around Norfolk.

Taylor attended the College of William & Mary, graduating with an A.B. degree. He then, enrolled in the University of Virginia in the fall of 1867. Taylor lived in 47 West Range (part of The Range) until 1869, studying pre-law.

On Sunday evening March 1, 1868, at 47 West Range, Pi Kappa Alpha was founded by Taylor, his cousin and roommate Littleton Waller Tazewell Bradford, and four other students. Taylor was behind the founding of Pi Kappa Alpha and gave the fraternity its name, rituals, and motto.

== Career ==
After graduating from the university, Taylor practiced law briefly in Norfolk. He engaged in a variety of commercial enterprises and real estate in Norfolk, amassing a small fortune. He was the treasurer of the Norfolk Draw Bridge Company and the secretary and tresurer of the Norfolk and Ocean View Railroad. He served on the board of directors of the City Gas Light Company of Norfolk and the Upshur Guano Company. With George R. Wilson, he formed Wilson & Taylor, a wholesaler and retailer of ice they imported from ponds in Boston, Massachusetts. He also was the secretary of the Ocean View Hotel, a 25-room hotel that was on the Chesapeake Bay.

In March 1870, Virginia's Governor Gilbert C. Walker appointed Taylor the notary public for Norfolk. Taylor was elected as a Democratic member of the Virginia House of Delegates for Norfolk from 1874–1875. He was elected president of the Select Council of Norfolk on July 1, 1880. Later, he became the president of the Common Council of Norfolk, resigning in October 1889 to return to the House of Delegates.

In January 1888, Taylor and his partners incorporated the Elizabeth River Navigation Company to operate a toll ferry between Norfolk and Portsmouth, VIrginia. Taylor was reelected to the Virginia House of Delegates for Norfolk, serving from 1890–1891. In May 1892, he was elected president of the Norfolk Real Estate Investment Company.

== Personal life ==
Taylor married Anna Brooke. They had a daughter and four sons—Brooke Taylor, Tazwell Taylor, Southgate Taylor, Anna Taylor, and Seldon Taylor. The family lived in Norfolk and had a cottage at Virginia Beach, Virginia.

Taylor was known as a philanthropist, contributing to community service projects. In 1872, he served on the executive committee of the Virginia and North Carolina Agricultural Society which arranged a fair with a regatta, auction, and sailing boat race. In November 1881, Governor Frederick W. M. Holliday appointed Taylor to the state board of visitors of the Eastern Lunatic Asylum. He also served on the board of directors of the Retreat for the Sick.

He was a member of the vestry of Christ Church in Norfolk and served on the Committee of Entertainment and Quarters of the Delegates to the Protestant Episcopal Council of Virginia. He served on the executive committee of the alumni association of the College of William & Mary. He was also a member of the Owens Lodge of the Ancient Free and Accepted Masons.

Taylor died on February 16, 1896, in front of the Hume & Billsoly store on Main Street in Norfolk. He died from heart failure. He was forty-eight years old, and most of his children were still young. He was buried in Elmwood Cemetery in Norfolk.
