= 1877 New Jersey gubernatorial election =

- November 6, 1877
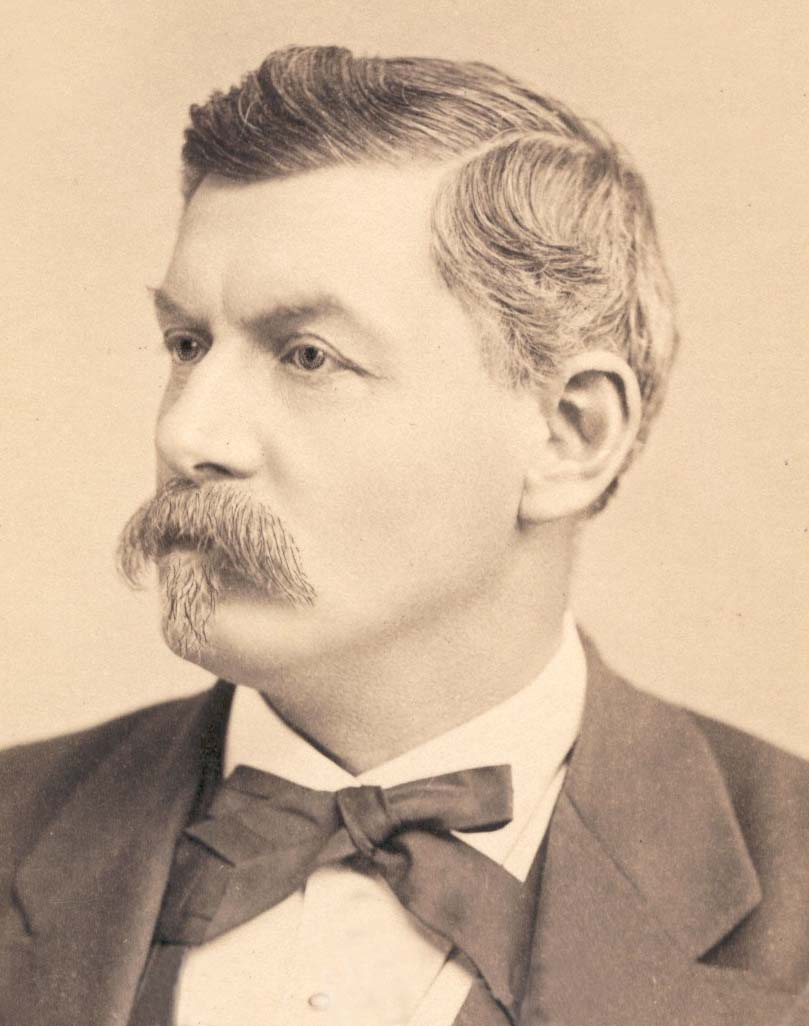

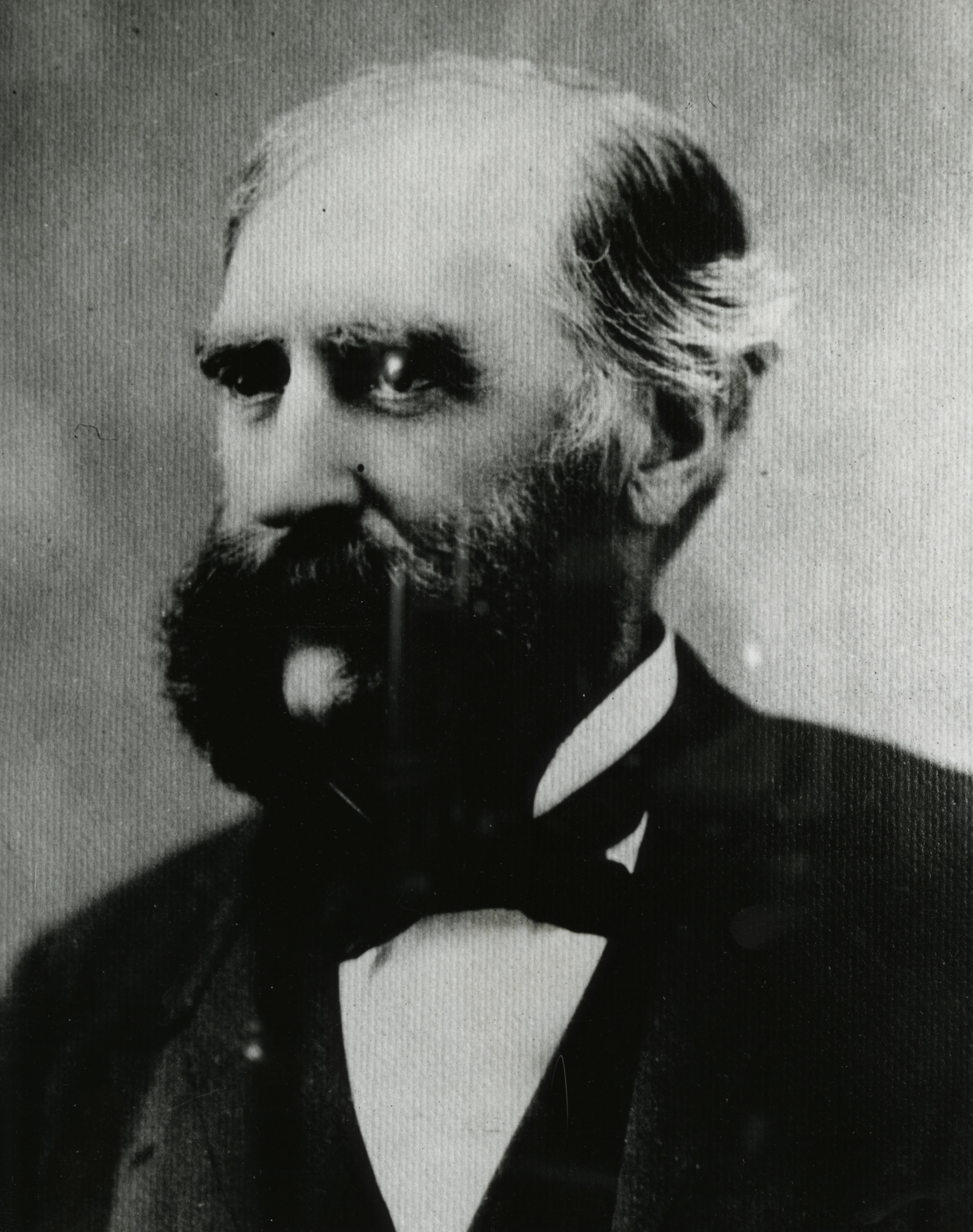
Nominee	George B. McClellan	William A. Newell
Party	Democratic	Republican
Popular vote	97,837	85,094
Percentage	51.65%	44.92%
- County results McClellan: 40–50% 50–60% 60–70% Newell: 40–50% 50–60%
Governor before election
Joseph D. Bedle
Democratic
Elected Governor
George B. McClellan
Democratic

The 1877 New Jersey gubernatorial election was held on November 6, 1877. Democratic nominee George B. McClellan, who was the national Democratic Nominee in 1864, defeated Republican nominee William A. Newell with 51.65% of the vote.

== General election ==
=== Candidates ===
- Rodolphus Bingham (Prohibition)
- Thomas D. Hoxsey (Greenback)
- George B. McClellan, former General of the U.S. Army and Democratic nominee for president in 1864 (Democratic)
- William A. Newell, former Governor of New Jersey (Republican)

=== Results ===
New Jersey gubernatorial election, 1877
Party	Candidate	Votes	%	±%
Democratic	George B. McClellan	97,837	51.65%	▼2.00
Republican	William A. Newell	85,094	44.92%	▼1.43
Greenback	Thomas D. Hoxsey	5,069	2.68%	N/A
Prohibition	Rodolphus Bingham	1,439	0.76%	N/A
Majority		189,439		
Total votes			100.00%	
Democratic hold		Swing		
