= Saint Paul's Episcopal Church (Norfolk, Virginia) =

Historic church in Virginia, US

- St. Paul's Church
- U.S. National Register of Historic Places
- Virginia Landmarks Register
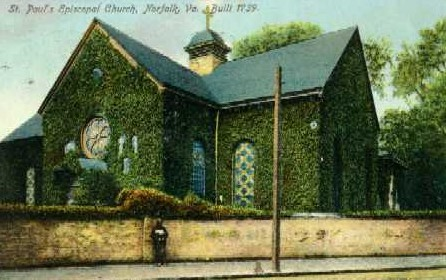
- Saint Paul's Episcopal Church in 1907

- Location within Virginia Location within the United States
- Location: 201 St. Paul's Blvd., Norfolk, Virginia
- Coordinates: 36°50′51.5″N 76°17′07.1″W
- Area: 2 acres (0.81 ha)
- Built: 1739
- Architectural style: Georgian
- NRHP reference No.: 71001058
- VLR No.: 122-0025

Significant dates
- Added to NRHP: July 2, 1971
- Designated VLR: March 2, 1971

Saint Paul's Episcopal Church (also known as Borough Church) is a historic church in Norfolk, Virginia, United States. The Nave of the current church was built in 1739 and is the sole colonial-era building which survived the various wars that Norfolk has witnessed. The church has played host to several different denominations throughout its history. Originally a Church of England parish, the building was home to a Baptist parish in the early-19th century and was finally converted back into an Episcopal church.

== History ==
=== Tenants ===
During the Revolutionary War, the Church of England was disestablished in Virginia and replaced with the Episcopal Church. The Elizabeth River Parish of this new church was divided in 1797 by two feuding congregations. One faction formed Christ Church (which later became Christ and St. Luke's Church), while the other retained the building until 1803, when it was acquired by Baptists. The Episcopalians reclaimed the building in 1832, and Bishop Richard Channing Moore reconsecrated it under the name Saint Paul's.

=== In wartime ===
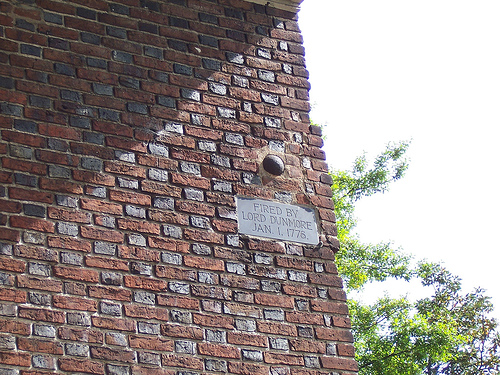
Cannonball in the wall of Saint Paul's Episcopal Church

Following his defeat at the Battle of Great Bridge, Lord Dunmore attacked Norfolk from the sea as he fled Virginia on January 1, 1776. In retaliation, patriots set fire to the homes of loyalists; however, the fire became unmanageable, and nearly the entire town was destroyed by the flame. The church was the only major building in the city to escape substantial damage in the assault, though a cannonball (purportedly fired by the Liverpool) did strike its wall. By the 1830s, the cannonball was no longer embedded in the wall. In the 1840s, it was discovered buried in the church's yard and re-embedded into the wall where it remains to this day. During the Civil War, the building acted as a chapel for the Union army.

Visiting the church while in Norfolk during World War II, Lord Louis Mountbatten is reputed to have said that Dunmore's cannonball "damn near missed" its target.

== Notable ceremonies ==
General Douglas MacArthur requested to be buried in Norfolk, Virginia, where his mother had been born and where his parents had married. Accordingly, his funeral service was held in St Paul's and his body was finally laid to rest in the rotunda of the Douglas MacArthur Memorial (the former courthouse in Norfolk) on 11 April 1964.
