= Charles Smith Olden =

American politician (1799–1876)

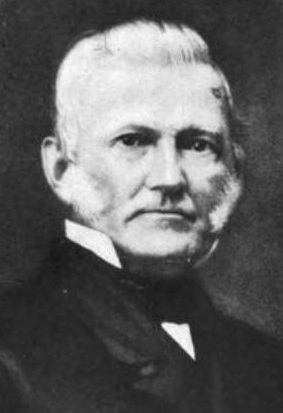

19th Governor of New Jersey
- In office January 17, 1860 – January 20, 1863
- Preceded by: William A. Newell
- Succeeded by: Joel Parker

Member of the New Jersey Senate from Mercer County
- In office 1845–1851
- Preceded by: New Jersey Legislative Council
- Succeeded by: William Cowper Alexander

Personal details
- Born: February 19, 1799 near Princeton, New Jersey, U.S.
- Died: April 7, 1876 (aged 77) Princeton, New Jersey, U.S.
- Party: Whig (1844–51); Opposition (1859–63); National Union (1863–64)

Charles Smith Olden (February 19, 1799 – April 7, 1876) was an American merchant, banker, and politician who served as the 19th governor of New Jersey from 1860 to 1863 during the first part of the American Civil War. As Governor, Olden supported President Abraham Lincoln and the national war effort but favored union and reconciliation with the South above all else; before the war, he argued slavery was properly understood as the sole regulatory province of the states, and he later opposed Lincoln's Emancipation Proclamation.

His mansion, Drumthwacket, was bought by the state in 1966 and became the official residence of the governor of New Jersey in 1981.

== Early life ==
Olden was born in 1799 near Princeton, New Jersey, to Hart Olden and Temperance Smith. His family were Quakers. He attended the Lawrenceville School.

Upon his graduation from Lawrenceville, Olden worked in his father's store for some time before joining the mercantile firm of Matthew Newkirk. From 1826 to 1832, he opened and ran a New Orleans branch of Newkirk's firm.

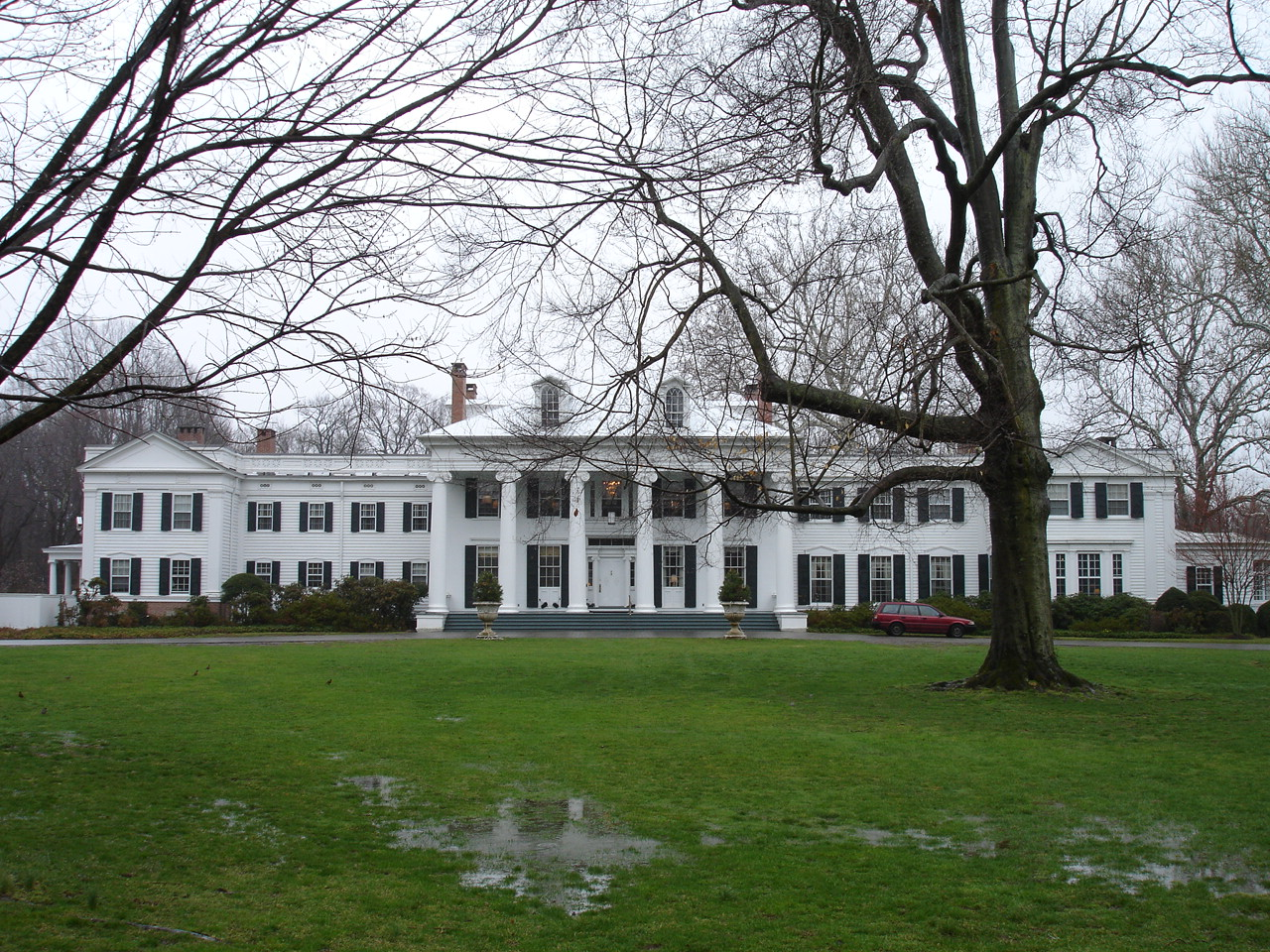
Olden constructed Drumthwacket, which today serves as the official residence of the Governor of New Jersey.

After his uncle died and bequeathed Olden a large estate, he returned to Princeton, where he constructed Drumthwacket as his personal residence. He lived there as a gentleman farmer and joined the board of directors of the Trenton Banking Company in 1842.

== New Jersey Senate ==
In 1844, Olden was elected as a Whig to represent Mercer County in the New Jersey Senate. He was re-elected in 1847 and served until the conclusion of his second term in 1851. During his time in the Senate, he was chair of the Committee on Education and took interest in the State Lunatic Asylum.

In 1856, Olden supported Millard Fillmore, running on the American Party platform with Whig support, for President of the United States.

== Governor of New Jersey (1860–63) ==
=== 1859 election ===
In 1859, the Opposition Party, a loosely knit organization of former Whigs, Know Nothings, and Republicans, nominated Olden for Governor of New Jersey. He was also supported by the American Party. He narrowly defeated Democrat Edwin R.V. Wright in the general election.

=== Term in office ===
In his inaugural address in 1860, Olden said that each state had "exclusive and independent control of its domestic policy" and that slavery was "exclusively and eminently a matter of domestic policy, to be ... controlled by each State for itself." Nevertheless, he joined the Opposition Party in supporting Abraham Lincoln for President in the fall election.

As Governor during the last days before the American Civil War, Olden was an advocate for compromise and reconciliation with the South. He viewed secession as "anarchy" but blamed the crisis on "a few persons of extreme views both North and South." He called for vigorous enforcement of the Fugitive Slave Act by Northern states and was the only state Governor to attend the Washington Peace Conference in January 1861. He did not speak at the conference but voted in favor of several compromise resolutions, including the extension of slavery in the territories, provision of compensation for runaway slaves, and a prohibition on the Congressional abolition of slavery. Throughout the pre-war crisis, Olden feared that armed conflict or calls for secession would break out in New Jersey.

After the Battle of Fort Sumter and the outbreak of war, New Jersey and Olden shifted in decided favor of the Union. He wrote to President Lincoln, "New Jersey is a border state, and it is of great importance that she stand steadfast in the great conflict." He called a special legislative session, at which he asked for the creation of four regiments for coastal defense of southern New Jersey on both the river and ocean fronts. He later abandoned this call in favor of federal defense of the border. Throughout the first two years of the war, Olden rarely left Trenton.

In September 1862, Olden (along with the governors of border states Missouri, Kentucky, Delaware, and Maryland) declined to join a resolution of state governors expressing support of the Emancipation Proclamation.

Olden left office in January 1863, constitutionally prohibited from seeking a second term in office. He was succeeded by Democrat Joel Parker.

== Later career ==
After leaving office, Olden continued to support the national war effort. He was the first President of the Loyal National League of New Jersey, a non-partisan organization dedicated to bringing together supporters of the war. This organization became the New Jersey branch of the National Union Party in the campaigns of 1863 and 1864.

He was appointed to serve on the New Jersey Court of Errors and Appeals, then the state's highest court, serving from 1868 to 1873. He was a member of the Riparian Commission from 1869 to 1875 and a commissioner of the State Sinking Fund.

He was presidential elector for Ulysses S. Grant from New Jersey in 1872.

He served as treasurer of the College of New Jersey (now Princeton University) from 1849 to 1869 and was a member of its board of trustees from 1863 until 1875.

== Personal life and death ==
He married Phoebe Ann Smith in 1832. They adopted one daughter but had no children of their own.

He died at his home in Princeton on April 7, 1876. He was buried at the Stony Brook Meeting House and Cemetery.

== See also ==
- List of governors of New Jersey

Political offices
Preceded by William A. Newell	Governor of New Jersey; January 17, 1860 – January 20, 1863	Succeeded by Joel Parker
Party political offices
Preceded by William A. Newell	Opposition Nominee for Governor of New Jersey; 1859	Succeeded by Marcus Lawrence Ward
