= George Middleton (American politician) =

American politician

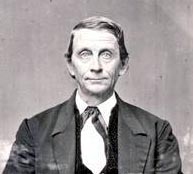

Member of the U.S. House of Representatives from New Jersey's 2nd district
- In office March 4, 1863 – March 3, 1865
- Preceded by: John L. N. Stratton
- Succeeded by: William A. Newell

Member of the New Jersey General Assembly
- In office 1858–1859

Personal details
- Born: October 14, 1800 Philadelphia, Pennsylvania, U.S.
- Died: December 31, 1888 (aged 88) Allentown, New Jersey, U.S.
- Party: Democratic
- Profession: politician

George Middleton (October 14, 1800 in Philadelphia, Pennsylvania – December 31, 1888 in Allentown, New Jersey) was an American Democratic Party politician who represented New Jersey's 2nd congressional district from 1863 to 1865.

Middleton was born in Philadelphia on October 14, 1800. He moved to Burlington, where he attended the public schools. He became a tanner and moved to Allentown, where he held several local offices. He served as a member of the New Jersey General Assembly in 1858 and 1859.

Middleton was elected as a Democrat to the Thirty-eighth Congress, serving in office from March 4, 1863 – March 3, 1865, but was an unsuccessful candidate for reelection in 1864 to the Thirty-ninth Congress.

After leaving Congress, he resumed the business of tanning. He died in Allentown on December 31, 1888, and was interred in Crosswicks Community Cemetery in Crosswicks, New Jersey.

U.S. House of Representatives
Preceded by John L. N. Stratton	Member of the U.S. House of Representatives from New Jersey's 2nd congressional district March 4, 1863 – March 3, 1865	Succeeded by William A. Newell
