= Joseph Addison Alexander =

American clergyman and biblical scholar (1809–1860)

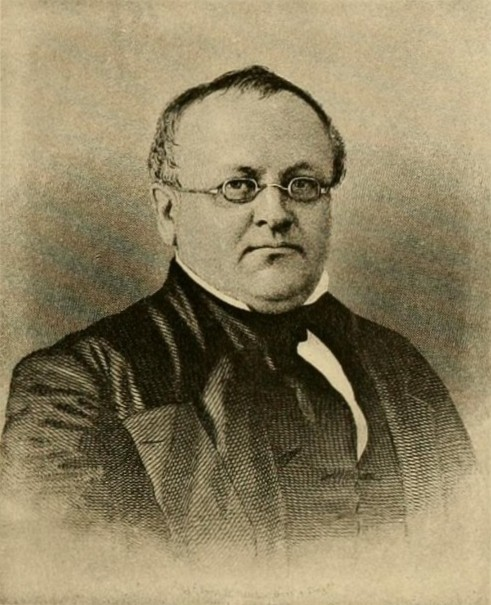
- Born: April 24, 1809; Philadelphia
- Died: January 28, 1860; Princeton Township
- Education: Princeton University
- Occupations: Educator, clergyman and biblical scholar
- Employers: Princeton Theological Seminary (1838–1860); Princeton University (1830–1833)
- Parents: Archibald Alexander (father); Janetta Alexander (mother)
- Awards: Doctor of Divinity (1845, Franklin & Marshall College); Doctor of Divinity (Rutgers University)

Joseph Addison Alexander (April 24, 1809 – January 28, 1860) was an American clergyman and biblical scholar.

== Early life and education ==
He was born in Philadelphia, Pennsylvania on April 24, 1809, the third son of Archibald Alexander and Janetta Waddel Alexander, brother to James Waddel Alexander and William Cowper Alexander. He graduated at the College of New Jersey (now Princeton University) with the first honor, in the class of 1826, having devoted himself especially to the study of Hebrew and other languages.

== Career ==
Along with Robert Bridges Patton, Alexander established Edgehill seminary in Mercer County, New Jersey, and in 1830 he was made adjunct professor of ancient languages in Princeton College, holding the professorship until 1833. In 1834, he became an assistant to Dr. Charles Hodge, professor of oriental and biblical literature in the Princeton Theological Seminary, and in 1838, he became associate professor of oriental and biblical literature there, succeeding Dr. Hodge in that chair in 1840 and being transferred in 1851 to the chair of biblical and ecclesiastical history, and in 1859 to that of Hellenistic and New Testament literature, which he occupied until his death at Princeton on January 28, 1860.

Alexander was distinguished in Oriental scholarship as well as in biblical learning, and was a thorough master of the modern European languages. He had been ordained as a Presbyterian minister in 1839, and was well known for his pulpit eloquence. He was the author of The Earlier Prophecies of Isaiah (1846), The Later Prophecies of Isaiah (1847), and an abbreviation of these two volumes, Isaiah Illustrated and Explained (2 vols., 1851), The Psalms Translated and Explained (3 vols., 1850), Commentary on Acts (2 vols., 1857) and Commentary on Mark (1858). After his death there appeared his two volumes of Sermons (1860), Commentary on Matthew (1861) and Notes on New Testament Literature (1861). Henry Carrington Alexander prepared a biography first published in 1869.

He was elected to the American Philosophical Society in 1845.
