= George R. Robbins =

American politician (1808–1875)

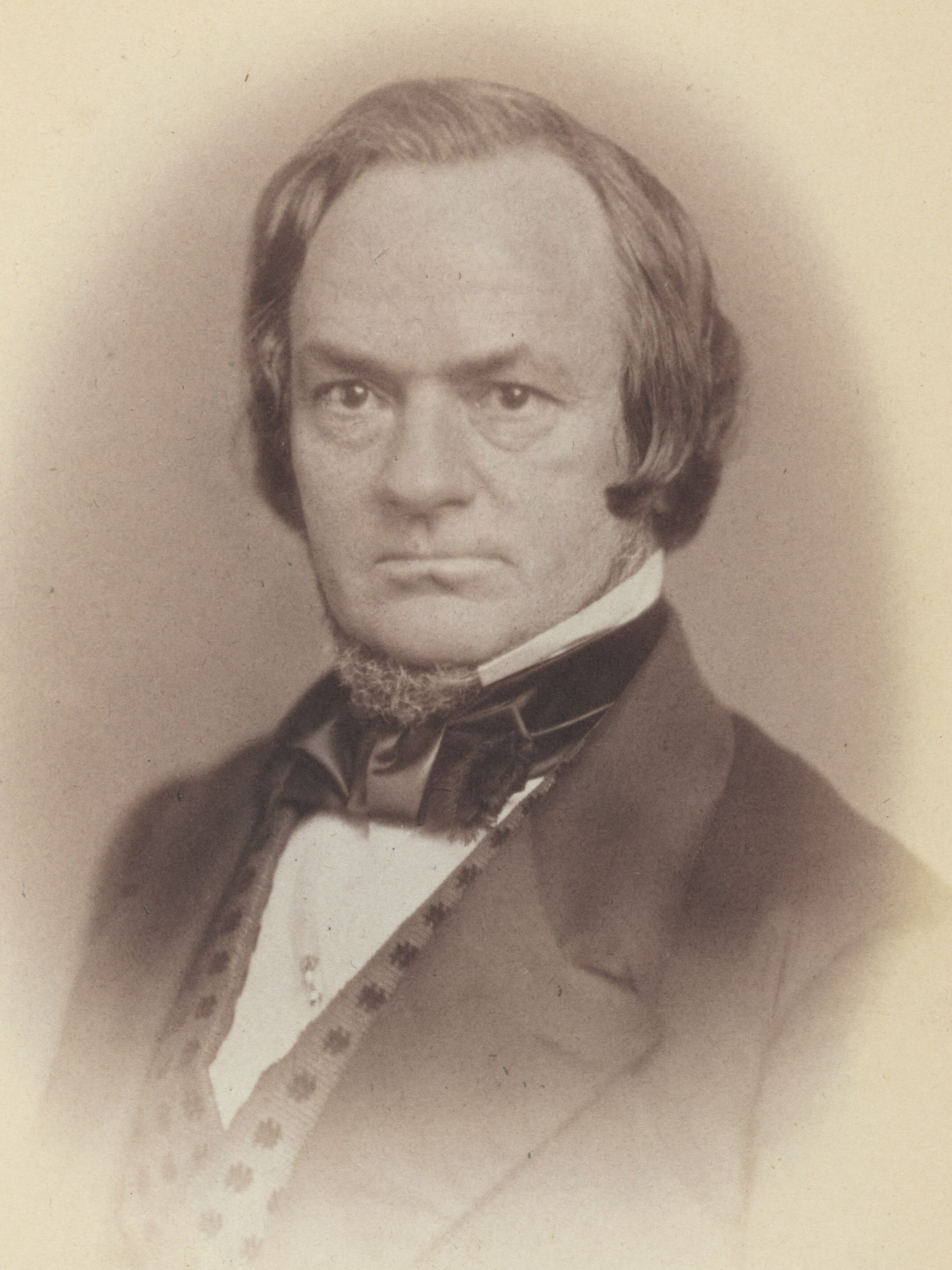
- Robbins c. 1859

Member of the U.S. House of Representatives from New Jersey's 2nd district
- In office March 4, 1855 – March 3, 1859
- Preceded by: Charles Skelton
- Succeeded by: John L. N. Stratton

Personal details
- Born: George Robbins Robbins; September 24, 1808 Allentown, New Jersey, U.S.
- Died: February 22, 1875 (aged 66) Hamilton Square, New Jersey, U.S.
- Resting place: Presbyterian Church Cemetery
- Party: Whig (1855–57); Republican (1857–59)
- Profession: Physician, politician

George Robbins Robbins (September 24, 1808 – February 22, 1875) was an American medical doctor and politician who represented Burlington, Mercer, Monmouth, and Ocean counties in the United States House of Representatives for two terms from 1855 to 1859. In his first term in Congress, he was a member of the Northern opposition to the Franklin Pierce administration, which coalesced into the Republican Party in his second term in office.

== Early life and career ==
Robbins was born in Allentown, New Jersey, on September 24, 1808. He received a good literary education, and was graduated from the Jefferson Medical College at Philadelphia in 1837, and commenced the practice of medicine in Fallsington, Pennsylvania. He moved to Hamilton Square, New Jersey the same year and continued the practice of medicine.

== Congress ==
Robbins was elected as a Whig Party candidate to the Thirty-fourth Congress. He was reelected as a Republican to the Thirty-fifth Congress, serving in office from March 4, 1855, to March 3, 1859, but was not a candidate for renomination in 1858 to the Thirty-sixth Congress.

== Death and legacy ==
After leaving Congress, he resumed the practice of his profession. He died in Hamilton Square on February 22, 1875, and was interred in the Presbyterian Church Cemetery.

Robbinsville Township, New Jersey, is named after him.

U.S. House of Representatives
Preceded by Charles Skelton	Member of the U.S. House of Representatives from New Jersey's 2nd congressional district March 4, 1855 – March 3, 1859	Succeeded by John L.N. Stratton
