= John L. N. Stratton =

American politician (1817-1889)

John L.N. Stratton
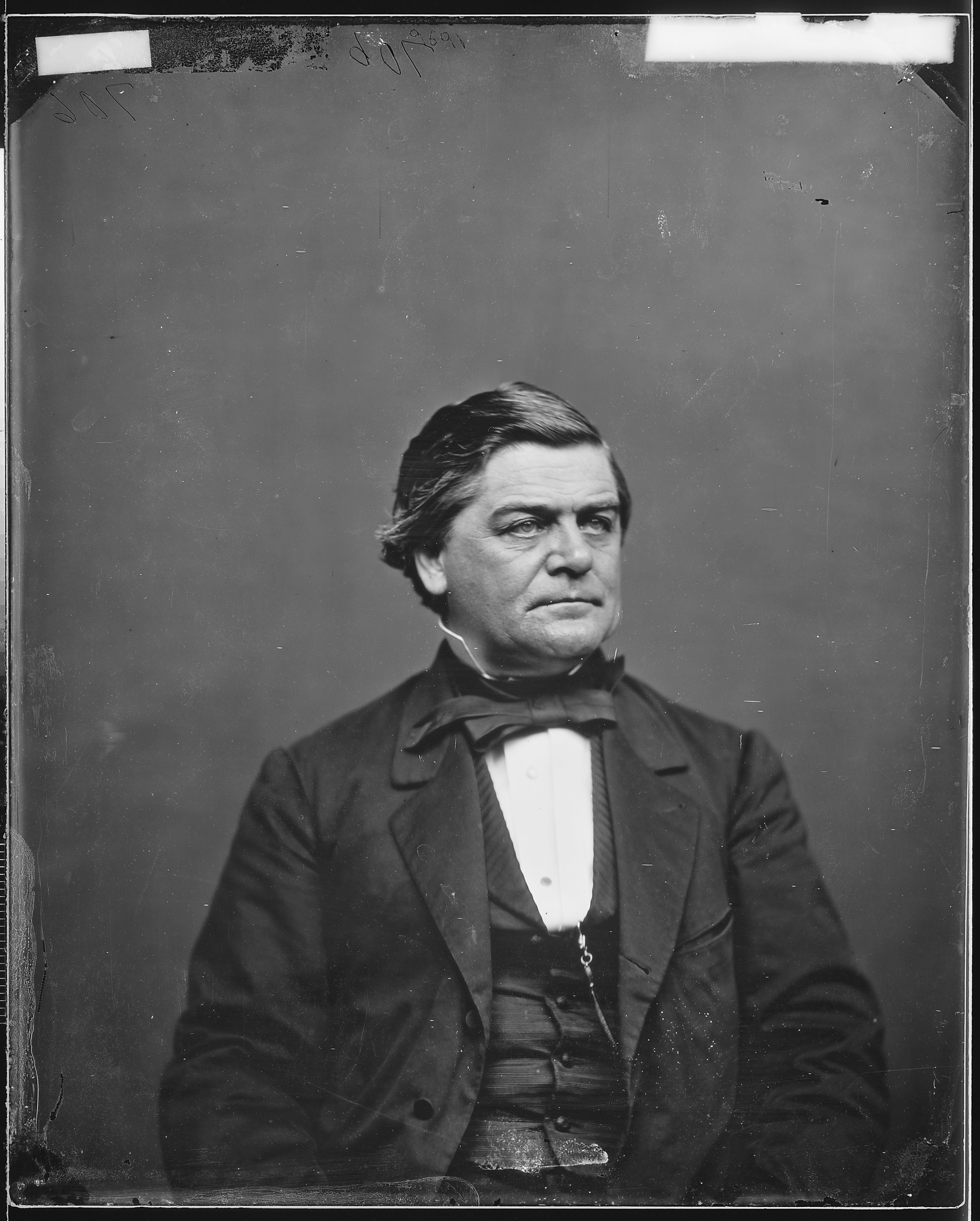
- Mathew Brady Collection, Library of Congress

Member of the U.S. House of Representatives from New Jersey's 2nd district
- In office March 4, 1859 – March 3, 1863
- Preceded by: George R. Robbins
- Succeeded by: George Middleton

Personal details
- Born: John Leake Newbold Stratton; November 27, 1817 Mount Holly, New Jersey, US
- Died: May 17, 1889 (aged 71) Mount Holly, New Jersey, US
- Resting place: St. Andrews Cemetery
- Party: Republican
- Profession: Politician

John Leake Newbold Stratton (November 27, 1817, Mount Holly Township, New Jersey – May 17, 1889, Mount Holly Township, New Jersey) was an American Republican Party politician who represented New Jersey's 2nd congressional district for two terms from 1859 to 1863.

== Early life and career ==
Stratton was born in Mount Holly, New Jersey, on November 27, 1817. He attended private schools at Mount Holly, prepared for college at Mendham, and graduated from Princeton College in 1836. He was a lawyer in private practice. In 1842, he married Caroline Elizabeth Newbold, a distant cousin. In 1845, they had a son, James; in 1850, they had a daughter, Louisa. James would follow in his father's footsteps and attend Princeton, graduating in 1865, before entering law as a commissioner for the New Jersey Third Circuit Court and eventually entering military service, dying in 1886 as a colonel.

== Congress ==
Stratton was elected as a Republican to the Thirty-sixth and Thirty-seventh Congresses, serving in office from March 4, 1859, to March 3, 1863, but was not a candidate for renomination in 1862 to the Thirty-eighth.

== Later career and death ==
He was a delegate to the Union National Convention of Conservatives at Philadelphia in 1866, and was president of the Farmers’ National Bank of Mount Holly in 1875. He died on May 17, 1889, in Mount Holly, and was interred there in St. Andrews Cemetery.

U.S. House of Representatives
Preceded by George R. Robbins	Member of the U.S. House of Representatives from New Jersey's 2nd congressional district March 4, 1859 – March 3, 1863	Succeeded by George Middleton
