= Samuel Davies Alexander =

American presbyterian minister

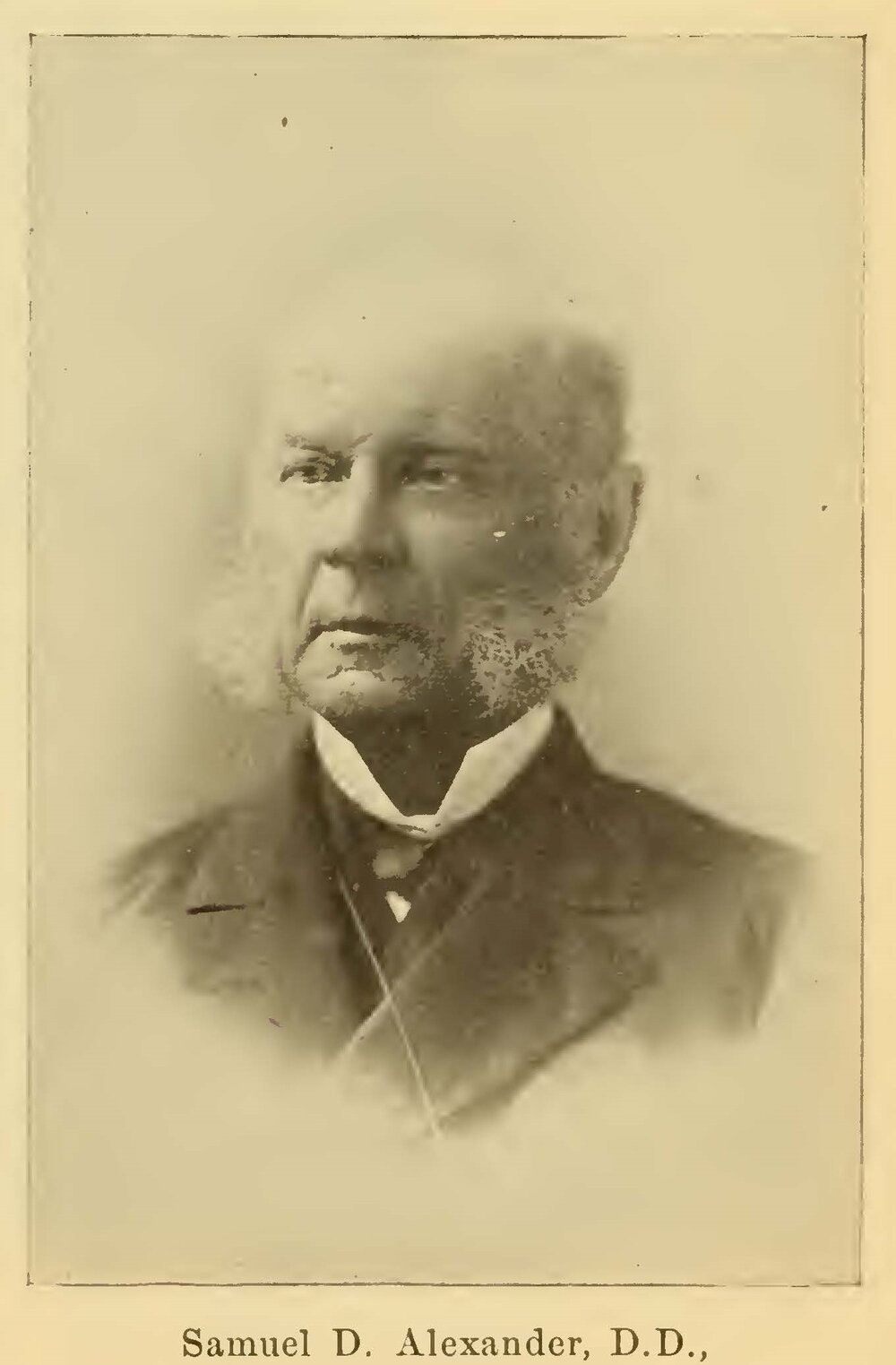
- Born: May 3, 1819; Princeton
- Died: October 26, 1894; New York City
- Education: Princeton University, Princeton Theological Seminary, Washington College
- Occupations: Clergyman, author
- Father: Archibald Alexander

Samuel Davies Alexander (May 3, 1819 – October 26, 1894) was a Presbyterian minister.

Samuel Davies Alexander was born on May 3, 1819, in Princeton, New Jersey, son of Archibald Alexander, clergyman. He was graduated from Princeton College in the class of 1838, and then entered the Princeton Theological Seminary, being ordained to the Presbyterian ministry in 1847. The following year he took pastoral charge of the Port Richmond Presbyterian church in Philadelphia, Pa., remaining there two years, and removing at the end of that time to Freehold, N. J., where he preached five years. In 1855 he accepted a call to the Phillips Presbyterian church in New York City, and successfully discharged the duties of his position until 1893. Washington College conferred on him the degree of S.T.D. in 1862. During the last year of his life he acted as clerk of the New York presbytery. He published "Princeton College during the Eighteenth Century" (1872), and "History of the Presbyterian Church in Ireland." He died in New York City, October 26, 1894.
