= John Manners (American politician) =

American physician, lawyer and politician (1786-1853)

4th President of the New Jersey Senate
- In office 1852–1853
- Preceded by: Silas D. Canfield
- Succeeded by: William C. Alexander

Member of the New Jersey Senate from Hunterdon County
- In office 1850–1852
- Preceded by: Isaac G. Farlee
- Succeeded by: Alexander V. Bonnell

Personal details
- Born: April 8, 1786 Amwell Township, Hunterdon County, New Jersey
- Died: June 24, 1853 (aged 67) Clinton Township, New Jersey, U.S.
- Party: Democratic
- Spouse: Eliza Cooper Manners
- Education: Princeton University; University of Pennsylvania School of Medicine

John Manners (April 8, 1786 – June 24, 1853) was an American medical doctor, lawyer, and politician who served as President of the New Jersey Senate.

== Biography ==
Manners was born on April 8, 1786 in the now-defunct municipality of Amwell Township, Hunterdon County, New Jersey to John and Rachel (Stout) Manners.

He went to Philadelphia to read medicine with Benjamin Rush and Thomas Cooper, graduating from the University of Pennsylvania School of Medicine in 1812. He received an honorary Master of Arts degree from the College of New Jersey (now Princeton University) in 1816.

He returned to Hunterdon County to practice medicine, residing in Flemington and later settling in Clinton Township.

Manners read law with James Madison Porter of Easton, Pennsylvania and was licensed to practice law in the highest courts. He tried cases before the United States Supreme Court.

He represented Hunterdon County in the New Jersey Senate from 1850 to 1852, serving as Senate President in 1852.

He was a friend and frequent correspondent of Thomas Jefferson regarding scientific matters.

Manners died in Clinton on June 24, 1853 from "affection of the heart." He was interred at Mercer Cemetery in Trenton.

== Family ==
Manners married Eliza Cooper (1790–1840), the daughter of Thomas Cooper, in Philadelphia on August 2, 1810. He was the first cousin of David Stout Manners and the first cousin thrice removed of Horace Griggs Prall.

== Legacy ==
In 1992, a historical marker was erected at his gravestone in the historic Mercer Cemetery at Trenton, and was designated as a Trenton City Landmark.

Political offices
Preceded by Silas D. Canfield	President of the New Jersey Senate; 1852	Succeeded by William C. Alexander
Preceded by Isaac G. Farlee	Member of the New Jersey Senate from Hunterdon County; 1850-1852	Succeeded by Alexander V. Bonnell
