= Hudson City, New Jersey =

Former city in northeast New Jersey, United States (1855–1870)

Coordinates: 40.746°N 74.055°W

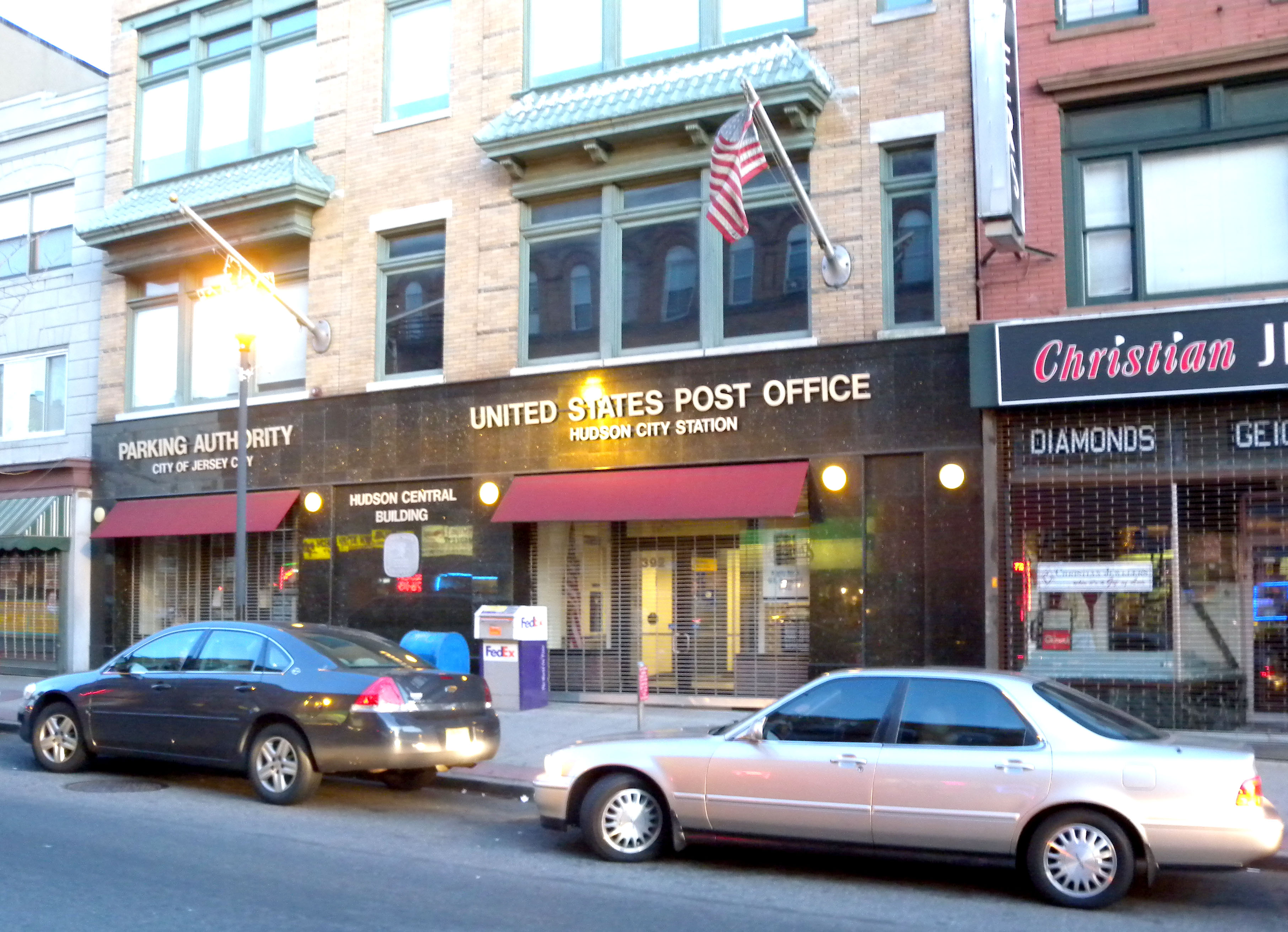
Hudson City Post Office

Hudson was a city that existed in Hudson County, New Jersey, United States, from 1855 to 1870, when it became part of Jersey City.

== History ==
Hudson Town, a predecessor of Hudson City, was formed by an Act of the New Jersey Legislature on April 12, 1852, from portions of North Bergen Township.

Hudson City itself was incorporated on April 11, 1855, from portions of Hudson Town and North Bergen Township.

Fifteen years later, Hudson City, along with neighboring Bergen City, were annexed by Jersey City on May 2, 1870. The former Hudson City is now known as The Heights section of the city.

== Notable residents ==
- Edwin R. V. Wright, Mayor of Hudson City in 1855, who represented New Jersey's 5th congressional district from 1865 to 1867.
