= Samuel Miller (theologian) =

American Theologian

The Reverend Samuel Miller
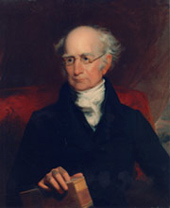
- Born: October 31, 1769; Dover, Delaware, British America
- Died: January 7, 1850 (aged 80); Princeton, New Jersey, U.S.
- Spouse: Sarah Sergeant (m. 1801)

Ecclesiastical career
- Religion: Christianity (Presbyterian)
- Church: Presbyterian Church in the United States of America
- Ordained: 1793
- Offices held: Moderator of the General Assembly (1806)

Academic background
- Education: University of Pennsylvania

Academic work
- Discipline: Theology; history
- Institutions: Princeton Theological Seminary

Samuel Miller (October 31, 1769 – January 7, 1850) was a Presbyterian theologian who taught at Princeton Theological Seminary.

== Biography ==
Samuel Miller was born in Dover, Delaware, on October 31, 1769. His father was the Rev. John Miller (1722–1791). Miller attended the University of Pennsylvania and graduated in 1789. He earned his license to preach in 1791, and the University of Pennsylvania awarded him a Doctorate of Divinity degree (D.D.) in 1804. From 1813 to 1849, he served as Professor of Ecclesiastical History and Church Government at Princeton Theological Seminary, and was also integral in founding the institution.

Throughout his life, Miller was a vigorous participant in many of the controversies that took place within the Presbyterian Church, including that which resulted in the division of the church into new and old schools. He was also considered an authority on many of the issues that faced Christians, especially Presbyterians, of his time. Miller is, perhaps, best known for the theological, polemical, and biographical writings he published throughout his life, including A Brief Retrospect of the Eighteenth Century (1803, 1805), Memoir of the Reverend John Rodgers (1813), Letters on Unitarianism (1821), An Essay on the Office of the Ruling Elder (1831), The Primitive and Apostolical Order of the Church of Christ Vindicated (1840), Letters from a Father to a Son in College (1843), and Thoughts on Public Prayer (1849). He was also responsible for the publication, in 1814, of the memoir and the writings of his elder brother, Edward Miller, a prominent physician and teacher in New York, who died in 1812.

Before his death he requested that none of his unpublished sermons should be published after his death. Miller died in Princeton, New Jersey, on January 7, 1850, leaving behind his wife, Sarah Miller, and his children. One son, Samuel Miller, Jr., undertook to write the life of his father, and the two-volume work (Life of Samuel Miller D.D.) was published in 1869.

Due to the number of letters addressed to, or dealing with, Samuel Miller, Jr., in the collection, the following brief biographical information about him is provided. Samuel Miller (the son), sometimes addressed as Jr., was born in Princeton, New Jersey, on January 23, 1816. He graduated from Princeton University in 1833 and went on to pass the bar in Philadelphia. However, he abandoned the law profession for the ministry and graduated from Princeton Theological Seminary in 1844. Samuel Miller, Jr., then became pastor of the Presbyterian Church in Mt. Holly, New Jersey, and was in charge of the church in Oceanic, New Jersey, from 1857 until 1873. In 1861, he was given his Doctorate of Divinity degree from Princeton. He died in Mt. Holly, New Jersey on October 12, 1883.

== Honors and memberships ==
- Elected a member of the American Antiquarian Society in 1813.
- Elected a member of the American Philosophical Society in 1800.

== Archival collections ==
The Presbyterian Historical Society in Philadelphia, Pennsylvania, has a collection of Samuel Miller's sermons, correspondence and biographical notes on his father, John Miller, and on his colleagues at Princeton Theological Seminary.

The Firestone Library at Princeton University has a collection in its holdings of correspondence and writings of and relating to Samuel Miller in its holdings.

The library at Princeton Theological Seminary has a collection in its holding relating to Samuel Miller.

== Bibliography ==
- An Essay on the Office of the Ruling Elder (1831)
- An essay on the warrant, nature, and duties of the office of the ruling elder in the Presbyterian Church
- The Christian education of children and youth
- Presbyterianism, the truly primitive and apostolical constitution of the Church of Christ
- The dangers of education in Roman Catholic seminaries
- The Primitive and Apostolical Order of the Church of Christ Vindicated (1840)
- The utility and importance of creeds and confessions : addressed particularly to candidates for the ministry
- Thoughts on Public Prayer (1849)
- The importance of a thorough and adequate course of preparatory study for the holy ministry
- Infant baptism scriptural and reasonable : and baptism by sprinkling or affusion, the most suitable and edifying mode
- Manual of Presbytery

=== Letters ===
- Letters on Unitarianism (1821)
- Letters from a Father to a Son in College (1843)
- Letters on clerical manners and habits: addressed to a student in the Theological Seminary at Princeton, N.J.
- Letters concerning the constitution and order of the Christian ministry: addressed to the members of the Presbyterian churches in the city of New York. To which is prefixed, a letter on the present aspect and bearing of the Episcopal controversy
- Letters on the eternal sonship of Christ: addressed to the Rev. professor Stuart, of Andover
- Letters on the observance of the Monthly concert in prayer : addressed to the members of the Presbyterian Church in the United States
- Letters to Presbyterians, on the present crisis in the Presbyterian Church in the United States
- A letter to a gentleman of Baltimore, in reference to the case of the Rev. Mr. Duncan
- A continuation of letters concerning the constitution and order of the Christian ministry : addressed to the members of the Presbyterian churches in the city of New-York : being an examination of the strictures of the Rev. Drs. Bowden and Kemp, and the Rev. Mr. How, on the former series

=== Memoirs ===
- Memoir of the Rev. John Rodgers : late pastor of the Wall Street and Brick churches, in the city of New York (1813)
- Memoir of the Rev. Charles Nisbet, D. D., late president of Dickinson College, Carlisle

=== Sermons ===
- A sermon, preached in New-York, July 4, 1793. : Being the anniversary of the independence of America: at the request of the Tammany Society, or Columbian Order
- A sermon, delivered February 5, 1799 : recommended by the clergy of the city of New-York, to be observed as a day of Thanksgiving, humiliation, and prayer : on account of the removal of a malignant and mortal disease, which has prevailed in the city some time before
- The difficulties and temptations which attend the preaching of the gospel in great cities : a sermon, preached in ... Baltimore, Oct. 19, 1820, at the ordination and installation of Rev. William Nevin
- A sermon delivered in the Middle Church, New Haven, Con., Sept. 12, 1822 : at the ordination of the Rev. Messrs. William Goodell, William Richards, and Artemas Bishop : as evangelists and missionaries to the heathen
- The literary fountains healed : a sermon, preached in the chapel of the College of New Jersey, March 9, 1823
- A sermon delivered June seventh, 1823, at the opening of the New Presbyterian Church in Arch Street in the city of Philadelphia, for the public worship of God
- Christian weapons not carnal but spiritual : a sermon(,) delivered in the Second Presbyterian Church(,) in the city of Baltimore(,) October 13, 1826(,) at the installation of the Reverend John Breckinridge(,) as colleague with the Reverend John Glendy, D.D., in the pastoral charge of the said church
- Holding fast the faithful Word : a sermon, delivered in the Second Presbyterian Church, in the City of Albany, August 26, 1829, at the installation of the Rev. William B. Sprague, D.D., as pastor of the said
- The Appropriate Duty and Ornament of the Female Sex, originally delivered before the Dorcas Society of the City of New York, year unknown, published in The Princeton Pulpit, 1852

=== History ===
- A Brief Retrospect of the Eighteenth Century (1803, 1805)
  - A brief retrospect of the eighteenth century. Part first in two volumes, containing a sketch of the revolutions and improvements in science, arts, and literature during that period. - (Volume 1)
  - A brief retrospect of the eighteenth century. Part first in two volumes, containing a sketch of the revolutions and improvements in science, arts, and literature during that period. - (Volume 2)
  - A brief retrospect of the eighteenth century. Part first in two volumes, containing a sketch of the revolutions and improvements in science, arts, and literature during that period. - (Volume 3)
- A brief history of the Theological Seminary of the Presbyterian Church, at Princeton, New Jersey : together with its constitution, by-laws, &c
- A history of popery, including its origin, progress, doctrines, practice, institutions, and fruits, to the commencement of the nineteenth century

=== Lectures ===
- The importance of the gospel ministry : an introductory lecture, delivered at the opening of the winter session of the Theological Seminary at Princeton, New Jersey, Nov. 9, 1827
- The Spruce street lectures : delivered by several clergymen during the autumn and winter of 1831-32 : To which is added, A lecture on the importance of creeds and confessions

=== Discourses ===
- The guilt, folly, and sources of suicide : two discourses, preached in the city of New-York, February, 1805
- A discourse, delivered in the chapel of Nassau-Hall, before the Literary and Philosophical Society of New Jersey, at its first annual-meeting, September 27, 1825

Religious titles
Preceded by James Richards	Moderator of the General Assembly of the Presbyterian Church in the United States of America; 1806	Succeeded by Archibald Alexander
