= James B. Sclater Jr. =

American fraternity founder (1847–1882)

- Born: James Benjamin Sclater Jr. July 19, 1847; Orange County, Virginia, US
- Died: April 5, 1882 (aged 34); Richmond, Virginia, US
- Burial place: Hollywood Cemetery (Richmond, Virginia)
- Education: Virginia Military Institute; University of Virginia
- Occupations: Commercial broker and druggist
- Employer(s): Brockenbrough & Sclater; J. B. Sclater & Son
- Known for: Founder of Pi Kappa Alpha

James Benjamin Sclater Jr. (July 19, 1847 – April 5, 1882) was an American commercial broker and druggist. He was a founder of Pi Kappa Alpha fraternity at the University of Virginia in 1868.

== Early life ==
Sclater was born in Orange County, Virginia, on July 19, 1847. He was the son of Harriet (née Wharton) of Louisa County and James Benjamin Sclater Sr. of Fluvanna County. Soon after his birth, his family moved to Richmond. In Richmond, his father was a produce and merchandise broker and agent for Williams & Brothers. His father was also a director of Citizens Bank of Richmond.

Sclater briefly attended the Cabell School in the Virginia. In March 1864, he started studies at Virginia Military Institute (VMI) when the college was temporarily relocated from Lexington to Richmond. Schater and the other VMI cadets served the Confederacy in the defense of Richmond. In April 1865 after General Robert E. Lee's army left Richmond, Sclater was paroled from the Cadet Battalion by order of Union Army officers.

Sclater enrolled in the University of Virginia in 1867, where he remained for two academic years. While there, he was one of the founders of Pi Kappa Alpha in 1868, along with other students he met while attending VMI. He lived in Room 47 with Robertson Howard, another Pi Kappa Alpha founder. Although he was later known to his friends as "Doc", Sclater did not receive a medical degree. He did, however, take two years of classes in anatomy and materia medica, chemistry and pharmacy, physiology and surgery, and medicine before leaving the university after the 1868–1869 academic year.

== Career ==
After leaving college, Sclater worked for his father in Richmond. He then started Brockenbrough & Sclater, a drug business in Charlotte, North Carolina. In 1870, he was a clerk in a drug store in Essex, New Jersey.

He returned to Richmond in 1870 and lived with his father. By March 1873, Sclater and his father had formed a business, J. B. Sclater & Son located at 5 South 14th Street. The Richmond City Directory listed his occupation as a commercial broker in 1873. However, the firm dissolved by mutual agreement on April 1, 1874.

The 1877 Richmond City Directory listed him as a clerk working for his father.

== Personal life ==
Sclater never married. His health declined in the 1870s. On April 5, 1882, he died of heart disease at the age of 35 at his uncle's Richmond home. He was buried in Hollywood Cemetery in Richmond. His grave was marked by an ornamental urn placed there by his sweetheart. On August 27, 1958, the Pi Kappa Alpha fraternity dedicated a marker for Sclater's grave.
