= Julian Edward Wood =

American soldier and fraternity founder

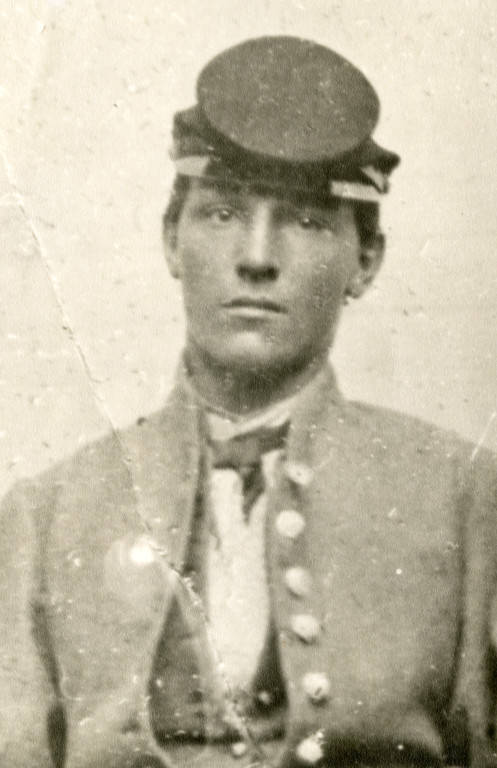
- Julian Edward Wood, VMI cadet, 1864
- Born: May 3, 1844; Currituck County, North Carolina, U.S.
- Died: June 2, 1921 (aged 77); Elizabeth City, North Carolina, U.S.
- Burial place: Hollywood Cemetery, Elizabeth City, North Carolina
- Education: Virginia Military Institute University of Virginia Washington College of Baltimore
- Occupation: Physician
- Known for: Founder of Pi Kappa Alpha
- Political party: Democratic

Julian Edward Wood (May 3, 1844 – June 2, 1911) was an American medical doctor, soldier, and a founder of Pi Kappa Alpha fraternity. He was also a member of the Virginia Military Institute's cadet corp at the Battle of New Market.

== Early life ==
Wood was born in 1844 in Currituck County, North Carolina. His parents were Sophia Marchant (née Trotman) and William Edward Wood, a physician, and farmer. When he was young, his father moved to Hampton, Virginia to a Hickory Grove, later the site of Hampton University. He attended the Hampton Military Academy.

Wood entered Virginia Military Institute (V.M.I.) on January 16, 1862. He served as a second cadet corporal in Company C in the V.M.I. Cadet Corps which helped secure a victory at the Battle of New Market. In this battle, Wood was a member of the color guard. On May 15, 1864; he was promoted to cadet sergeant of Company A with the Corps of Cadets. In this capacity, he was stationed in the trenches of Richmond, Virginia from 1864 to early 1865.

He resigned from V.M.I. on January 21, 1865, and became a first lieutenant in First North Carolina Regiment under General James Green Martin. He was a drill master and colonel of the First Division of the North Carolina Naval Reserves, until the end on the war. After the war, he returned to V.M.I.; he was made an honorary graduate of the class of 1866 on July 2, 1869.

In the fall of 1867, Wood enrolled in the University of Virginia to study medicine. On March 1, 1868, Wood and friends from V.Mi. who were also attending the university, founded of Pi Kappa Alpha. After attending the University of Virginia for two years, he transferred to Washington College of Baltimore and graduated with an M.D. in 1869.

== Career ==
Wood received his medical license in 1869. He established a medical practice in Elizabeth City, North Carolina where he worked for more than thirty years, becoming one of the leading physicians in Eastern North Carolina. He was also a surgeon for the Norfolk and Southern Railway. In 1889, he was selected as a delegate to the American Medical Association by the State Medical Society. In May 1911, Wood was appointed county health official by the Board of County Commissioners. However, he retired from private practice in 1911 because of his declining health.

== Pasquotank Rifles ==
In October 1881, Wood was an organizer of the Pasquotank Rifles military corp of Elizabeth City and served as its captain. In December 1881, Wood sent a telegram to North Carolina's Governor Thomas J. Jarvis, offering the assistance of the Pasquotank Rifles in the Plymouth race riot. Wood and his Rifles were armed with 45 caliber rifles and became Company E First Regiment of the North Carolina State Guard. In May 1888, the state provided uniforms for the Pasquotank Rifles, still under the leadership of Wood. They participated in the inauguration of Governor Daniel Gould Fowle in 1889.

In January 1891, Wood was elected colonel (commander) of the First Regiment of the North Carolina State Guard. He had a reputation as "a well informed and discreet officer." One of his assignments was to protect the state's oyster interests from oyster pirates. In late July 1892, Wood resigned from the First Regiment because it was conflicting with his responsibilities to his medical practice. The Sentinel of Winston-Salem wrote, "The loss of Col. Wood will be a heavy loss to the Guard, in which he has taken so much pride and used his energies for its success." However, in December 1992, the First Regiment's field officers elected Wood as its colonel for a two-year term. In April 1893, he was back patrolling for oyster pirates.

== Personal life ==
Wood married Mary Jane Scott of Elizabeth City on February 17, 1874. They had two children, a son William Edward Wood and a daughter Annie Mae Wood.

In April 1890, Wood was the Democratic nominee for the 5th ward of Elizabeth City's council and was elected to serve. Although he was not a man of significant wealth, Wood donated the pedestal for the "Edenton Tea Pot", a memorialto the Edenton Tea Party in Edenton, North Carolina. He was a member of the B.P. O. Elks and the Baptist church in Gatesville, North Carolina.

On November 2, 1910, Wood was stricken with a heart issue and slipped into unconsciousness. When reporting on his illness,The News and Observer noted, "He is one of the State's most distinguished and beloved citizens..." On June 3, 1911, Wood died at his home in Elizabeth City, at the corner of Church Street and Martin Street. He was buried in the Hollywood Cemetery in Elizabeth City.
