= Thomas H. Herring =

American politician (1812–1874)

President of the New Jersey Senate
- In office 1859
- Preceded by: Henry V. Speer
- Succeeded by: Charles L. C. Gifford

Member of the New Jersey Senate
- In office 1857–1859

Personal details
- Born: Thomas Hughes Herring; August 7, 1812 Albany, New York, U.S.
- Died: July 1, 1874 (aged 61)
- Parent(s): Thomas Herring; Lucy Olds
- Education: The Albany Academy
- Profession: Politician

Thomas Hughes Herring (August 7, 1812 – July 1, 1874) was an American politician who served in the New Jersey Senate from 1857 to 1859. He served as President of the Senate in 1859.

Born in Albany, New York to Thomas and Lucy (Olds) Herring, he graduated from The Albany Academy. Herring went to work as a clerk at Conkling & Herring, the firm of his brother and brother-in-law. At age 21, he was made a partner in the firm. In 1841, Herring retired from the business, but remained active in investing. He became the largest stockholder in the Northern Railroad of New Jersey, serving as its president from 1859 to 1869.

Herring was a resident of Ridgefield, New Jersey.
