= Robertson Howard =

American attorney and fraternity founder (1847–1899)

- Born: December 11, 1847; Brookeville, Maryland, US
- Died: December 1, 1899 (aged 51); Saint Paul, Minnesota, US
- Burial place: Congressional Cemetery
- Education: Georgetown University; University of Virginia; University of Maryland
- Occupation: Lawyer
- Known for: co-founder of Pi Kappa Alpha

Robertson Howard (December 11, 1847 – December 1, 1899) was a medical doctor, attorney, and publisher. He is best known as one of the six co-founders of Pi Kappa Alpha fraternity.

== Early life ==
Howard was born in Brookeville, Maryland on December 11, 1847. His parents were Lydia Maria (née Robertson) and Flodoardo R. Howard, a doctor. His mother was a descendant of Quakers.

When Howard was three years old, his father moved the family to Washington, D.C., where he purchased a plot of land directly across from Ford's Theatre and established a medical office. His father also founded the medical department of Georgetown University.

As a child, Howard attended Brookeville Academy, an institution founded in 1808 by his ancestors in Brookeville, Mayland. During the Civil War, Robertson, being a Quaker, refused to join either side. He graduated from Georgetown University with a doctorate of medicine in 1865. However, being only eighteen years old, he was considered too young to begin his practice.

Howard was sent to the University of Virginia, where he studied chemistry under one of his uncles. While there he shared Room 47, West Range with James Benjamin Sclater Jr., with whom he and four other men founded Pi Kappa Alpha Fraternity on March 1, 1868. This would become one of the first fraternities in the United States. Howard would remain close friends with these men for the rest of his life - it is said that Howard kept autographed photographs of his fellow co-founders in his possession throughout his lifetime.

== Career ==
After completing his post-graduate work at the University of Virginia, Howard was a member of the medical faculty of Georgetown University for two years, where he received an honorary Master of Arts. After leaving Georgetown, he worked for some time in the medical department of the National Museum, now the Arts and Industries Building of the Smithsonian Institution. He also was a medical attendant with the United States Army.

After losing interest in medicine, Howard received a Bachelor of Law degree in 1874 from the University of Mayland. He practiced law in Baltimore for five years, As a lawyer he handled western land claims, one of which led him to moving his family to St. Paul, Minnesota, in 1881. During approximately twenty years, Howard went into law partnership with Judge Wiliam A. Kerr, followed by former-governor William Rainey Marshall, and, then, J. M. Gilmam. He also twice left his law practice to be the editor of the West Publishing Company, a business that created law publications, a few of which he wrote himself. He was working in this capacity at the time of his death.

== Personal life ==
Howard married Isoline Maria Carusi on June 8, 1875. The couple had four sons and one daughter.

Howard died in Saint Paul, Minnesota on December 1, 1899 at the age of 52. His death was caused by erysipelas. His body was taken back to Washington, D.C., for burial in the Congressional Cemetery. His grave was unmarked for years, until his Pi Kappa Alpha fraternity furnished a bronze plaque in his memory.
