= Timber Ridge Presbyterian Church =

Historic church in Virginia, United States

- U.S. National Register of Historic Places
- Virginia Landmarks Register
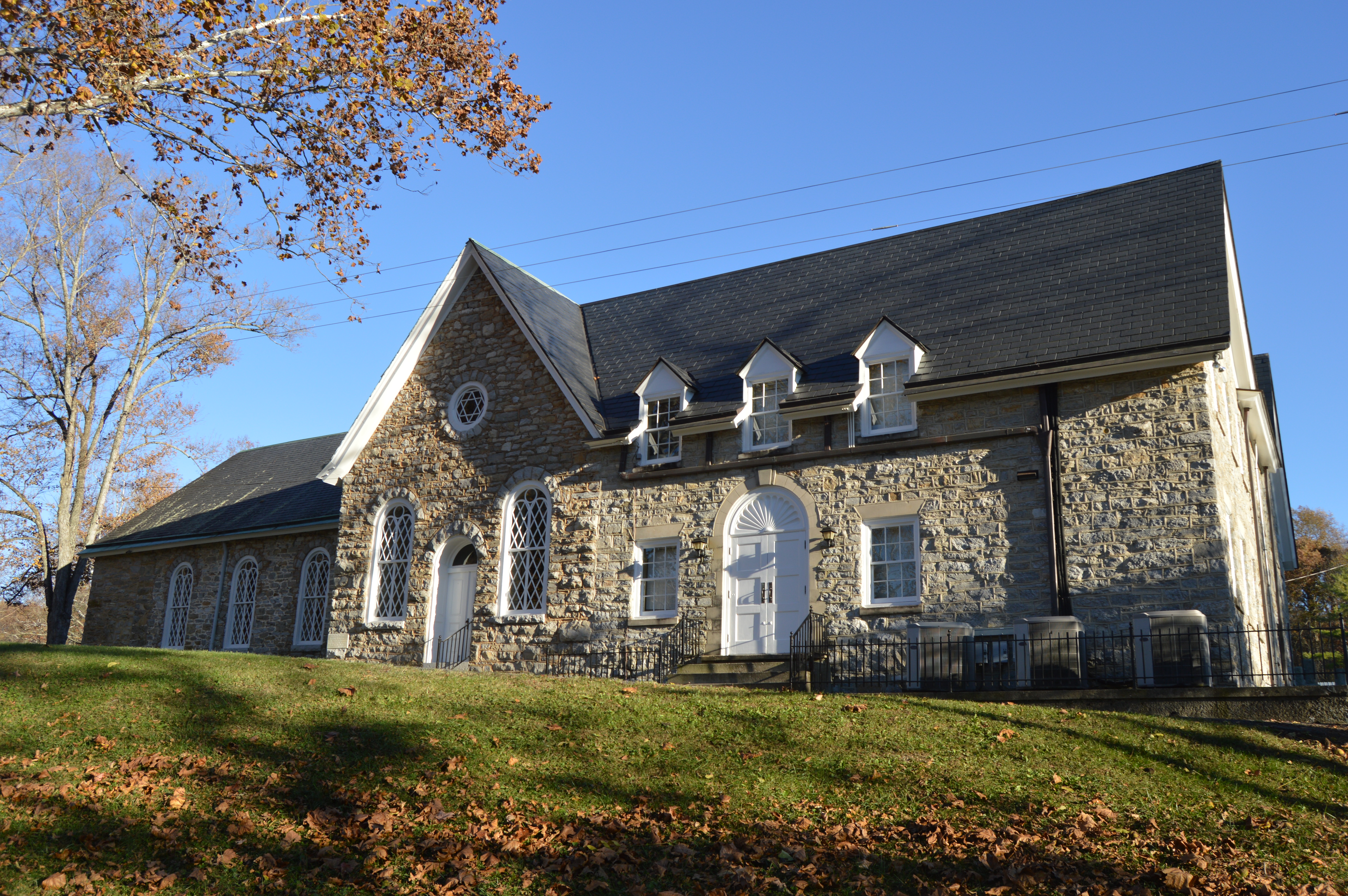
- Northern side of the church

- Location within Virginia Location within the United States
- Location: SW of jct. of Rtes. 11 and 716, near Lexington, Virginia
- Coordinates: 37°50′34″N 79°21′30″W
- Area: 0 acres (0 ha)
- Built: 1756, 1871, 1899-1900
- NRHP reference No.: 69000278
- VLR No.: 081-0066

Significant dates
- Added to NRHP: November 12, 1969
- Designated VLR: September 9, 1969

Timber Ridge Presbyterian Church is a historic Presbyterian church located near Lexington, Rockbridge County, Virginia. It was built in 1756, altered in 1871, and completely remodeled in 1899–1900. It is a one-story, rectangular gray limestone building with a gable roof. Also on the property is the contributing church cemetery with tombstones dated as early as 1773.

It was listed on the National Register of Historic Places in 1969.
