= William A. Newell =

18th Governor of New Jersey

William Augustus Newell
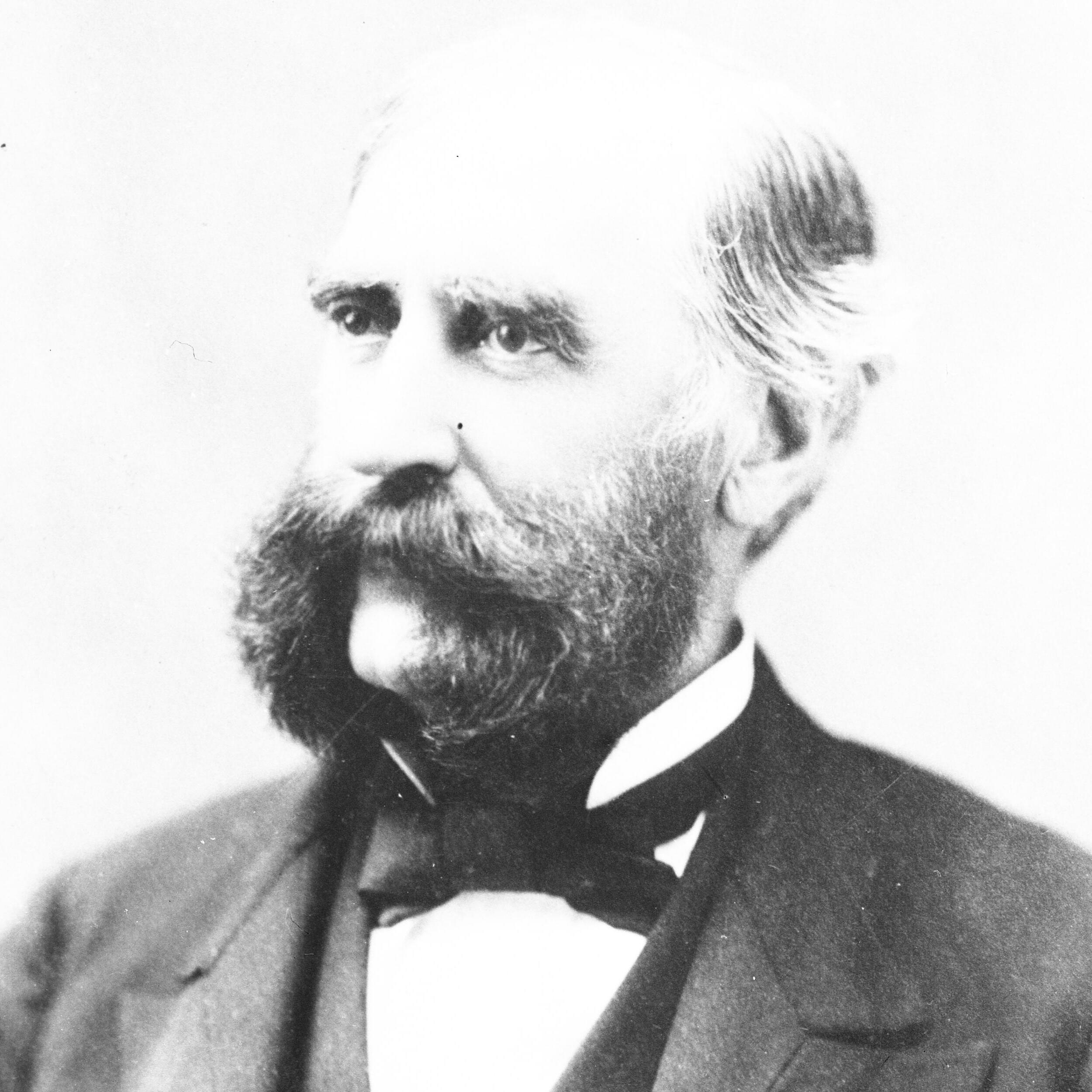
- Newell c. 1880 – c. 1884

11th Governor of Washington Territory
- In office November 1, 1880 – July 2, 1884
- Preceded by: Elisha P. Ferry
- Succeeded by: Watson C. Squire

18th Governor of New Jersey
- In office January 20, 1857 – January 17, 1860
- Preceded by: Rodman M. Price
- Succeeded by: Charles S. Olden

Member of the U.S. House of Representatives from New Jersey's 2nd district
- In office March 4, 1865 – March 3, 1867
- Preceded by: George Middleton
- Succeeded by: Charles Haight
- In office March 4, 1847 – March 3, 1851
- Preceded by: George Sykes
- Succeeded by: Charles Skelton

Personal details
- Born: September 5, 1817 Franklin, Ohio, U.S.
- Died: August 8, 1901 (aged 83) Allentown, New Jersey, U.S.
- Party: Whig; Opposition; Republican
- Spouse: Joanna Van Deursen
- Education: Rutgers College

William Augustus Newell (September 5, 1817 – August 8, 1901), was an American physician and politician who served as the 18th Governor of New Jersey and 11th Governor of the Washington Territory.

He also represented New Jersey for three terms in the United States House of Representatives, where he is probably best known for the Newell Act, which created the United States Life-Saving Service, a federal agency established to save the lives of shipwrecked mariners and passengers.

== Early life ==
William Augustus Newell was born in Franklin, Ohio, the son of James Newell and Elisa Hankinson. His grandfather, Hugh Newell, came from Ireland in 1704. His parents, from old New Jersey families, moved back to New Jersey when he was two years old.

He graduated from Rutgers College in 1836 and the University of Pennsylvania School of Medicine in 1839. He practiced medicine in the Manahawkin section of Stafford Township and was one of the local volunteers to rescue shipwrecks across Barnegat Bay. The frustrating experience of watching a ship full of passengers perish because the volunteers could not reach them that he first thought of creating a life-saving service.

He later moved to Allentown, where he first entered public office as tax collector for Upper Freehold Township. In an interview to a reporter later in life, he said he "was never so proud of his life as when he received his certificate of that office."

== United States House of Representatives ==
In 1846, Newell was elected as a Whig to the Thirtieth United States Congress.

During his first term, he added a single line to an appropriations bill allocating $10,000 for equipment to be used for responding to ships in distress close to shore. As a result of this appropriation, a series of light house stations were set up in New Jersey between Sandy Hook and Little Egg Harbor. Each station was equipped with a cannon that could shoot a line out to a ship for aiding in rescue efforts. The service was extended from Long Island to Cape May, and after rescuing 200 passengers and crew members from the Scottish brig Ayrshire, it was extended over the entire East Coast. Sometimes erroneously referred to as the Newell Act, this appropriation was a predecessor to the United States Life-Saving Service and today forms a major part of the United States Coast Guard.

He was re-elected in 1848 but did not stand for re-election in 1850.

He also served on multiple committees. He served on the Foreign Affairs and Revolutionary Claims committees.

== Governor of New Jersey (1857–60) ==
=== 1856 election ===
As the Whig Party declined, the opposition to the Democratic Party consisted of the nativist American Party and the anti-slavery Republican Party, united in an attempt to defeat the powerful Democratic Party. As a former Whig who was also opposed the extension of slavery, Newell was nominated for Governor at a joint convention in 1856. He won by just 3,000 votes over Democratic candidate William Cowper Alexander, but Democrats won most of the seats in the legislature.

=== Term in office ===
As governor, he urged lower taxes and balanced budgets, improvements in the school system, stricter naturalization procedures, restrictions on suffrage of naturalized citizens, and improvements to education and life-saving systems.

==== James Donnelly affair ====
Late in his first year as Governor, Newell was involved in a major controversy over the execution of James P. Donnelly, an Irish Catholic medical student sentenced to death by a Protestant judge and jury. Donnelly, from a New York City, was convicted of murdering Alfred S. Moses and sentenced to death in Monmouth County. His conviction became a cause célèbre to Irish Catholics in New Jersey, who viewed the evidence as doubtful and viewed the composition of the court as evidence of bias.

After Donnelly's appeals ran out, he sought commutation to a life sentence. While the Court of Pardons, on which the Governor sat ex officio, voted 6 to 2 against a commutation, Newell claimed to have cast the deciding vote for execution.

== Return to public office ==
Newell attended the Republican National Conventions in 1860 and 1864. President Abraham Lincoln appointed Newell to the Life-Saving Service of New Jersey.

In 1864, he was re-elected to the House of Representatives on a platform of support for the war. In 1866 he was defeated for re-election in part because of his nativist ties and his role in the Donnelly case. He unsuccessfully sought the nomination for Congress in 1868 and was nominated once again in 1870 but lost.

He ran for governor again in 1877 but lost to Civil War general George B. McClellan. Again, his role in the Donnelly case was an issue, particularly in Irish Jersey City.

=== Governor of the Washington Territory (1880–84) ===
In 1880, President Rutherford B. Hayes appointed Newell to be the governor of Washington Territory. He supported many of the same policies he did while he was governor of New Jersey: strengthening life-saving systems on the Pacific Ocean, lower taxes, temperance, and forced acculturation of Native Americans. He served until 1884, and then was United States Indian inspector for a year. He then resumed the practice of medicine, this time in Olympia, and remained there 14 more years. While living in Olympia, he was elected mayor.

In 1899, at the age of 82, he returned to Allentown, continuing the practice of medicine, and took an active role in the Monmouth County Historical Association.

== Personal life ==
Newell married Joanna VanDusen from New Brunswick. They had three sons and a daughter, with one son dying in early childhood.

== Death and legacy ==
He died at his home in Allentown on August 8, 1901, after a brief illness. Following his death, Governor Foster McGowan Voorhees draped the State House in black as a show of mourning. He lay in state at the State House in Trenton for three days, and his body was interred in a vault in Greenwood Cemetery before being moved to his family plot at Allentown Presbyterian Cemetery.

=== Legacy and honors ===
An on-campus apartment complex at Cook College, the agricultural school of Rutgers University, is named for him.

U.S. House of Representatives
Preceded by George Sykes	Member of the U.S. House of Representatives from New Jersey's 2nd congressional district March 4, 1847 – March 3, 1851	Succeeded by Charles Skelton
Preceded by George Middleton	Member of the U.S. House of Representatives from New Jersey's 2nd congressional district March 4, 1865 – March 3, 1867	Succeeded by Charles Haight
Political offices
Preceded by Rodman M. Price	Governor of New Jersey; January 20, 1857 – January 17, 1860	Succeeded by Charles S. Olden
Preceded by Elisha Peyre Ferry	Governor of Washington Territory; 1880–1884	Succeeded by Watson Carvosso Squire
Party political offices
Preceded by New political party	Republican Nominee for Governor of New Jersey; 1856	Succeeded by Charles S. Olden
Preceded by George A. Halsey	Republican Nominee for Governor of New Jersey; 1877	Succeeded by Frederic A. Potts
