= Edwin R. V. Wright =

American journalist (1812–1871)

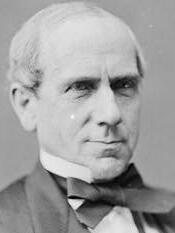
- Wright c. 1865–71

Member of the U.S. House of Representatives from New Jersey's 5th district
- In office March 4, 1865 – March 3, 1867
- Preceded by: Nehemiah Perry
- Succeeded by: George A. Halsey

Personal details
- Born: Edwin Ruthvin Vincent Wright; January 2, 1812 Hoboken, New Jersey, US
- Died: January 21, 1871 (aged 59) Jersey City, New Jersey, US
- Party: Democratic
- Profession: Politician, Lawyer, Editor

Edwin Ruthvin Vincent Wright (January 2, 1812 – January 21, 1871) was an American lawyer, newspaper editor, and Democratic Party politician from Hudson County, New Jersey. He was the Democratic Party nominee for Governor of New Jersey in 1859 and represented Hudson County and the city of Newark for one term in the United States House of Representatives.

== Biography ==
Born in Hoboken, New Jersey, Wright completed preparatory studies and engaged in newspaper work in 1835. He was editor of the Jersey Blue, a newspaper published in Hoboken, in 1836, studied law and was admitted to the bar in 1839, commencing practice in Jersey City, New Jersey. He later moved to Hudson City, New Jersey and commenced practice there. He was a member of the New Jersey Legislative Council in 1843, was county prosecutor of Hudson County, New Jersey from 1851 to 1855 and was Mayor of Hudson City, New Jersey in 1855. He ran for New Jersey governor against Charles Smith Olden in 1859 but lost the election.

Wright was elected as a Democrat to the United States House of Representatives in 1864, serving from 1865 to 1867, not being a candidate for reelection in 1866 due to ill health.

He died in Jersey City, New Jersey on January 21, 1871. He was interred in Hoboken Cemetery in North Bergen, New Jersey.

U.S. House of Representatives
Preceded by Nehemiah Perry	Member of the U.S. House of Representatives from New Jersey's 5th congressional district March 4, 1865 – March 3, 1867	Succeeded by George A. Halsey
Party political offices
Preceded by William C. Alexander	Democratic Nominee for Governor of New Jersey; 1859	Succeeded by Joel Parker
