= William Alexander Caruthers =

American novelist

- Born: 1802; Rockbridge County, Virginia
- Died: 1846 (aged 43–44); Savannah, Georgia
- Education: Washington and Lee University; University of Pennsylvania
- Occupation: Novelist
- Relatives: Archibald Alexander (uncle)

William Alexander Caruthers (1802–1846) was an American novelist.

== Biography ==
William Alexander Caruthers was born in 1802 in Rockbridge County, Virginia. His uncle, Archibald Alexander, served as the fourth President of Hampden–Sydney College. He was educated at Washington College (now Washington and Lee University) and later in medicine at the University of Pennsylvania School of Medicine. In 1837 he moved to Savannah, Georgia, where he resided until his death in 1846.

== Career ==
Caruthers' first novel, The Kentuckian In New York, published in 1834, is important for expressing skepticism about slavery, as well as arguing that termination was impractical at that point. The novel includes a subplot about a narrowly avoided slave revolt, which was likely influenced by Nat Turner's rebellion. Some credit a short inclusion of a letter by a slave in Arabic as influencing a similar subplot in Edgar Allan Poe's Narrative of Arthur Gordon Pym (1838). His later and somewhat better known works include The Cavaliers of Virginia, or the Recluse of Jamestown and The Knights of the Horse Shoe, a romanticized retelling of the historic Knights of the Golden Horseshoe Expedition, also known as the Transmontane Expedition.

== Bibliography ==
- The Kentuckian in New-York; or, The Adventures of Three Southerns, by a Virginian (1834)
- Cavaliers of Virginia; or, The Recluse of Jamestown. An Historical Romance of the Old Dominion (1834–1835, released in two parts)
- The Knights of the Golden Horse-Shoe, a Traditionary Tale of the Cocked Hat Gentry in the Old Dominion (1835)
