= William Cowper Alexander =

American politician (1806–1874)

5th president of the New Jersey Senate
- In office 1853–1856
- Preceded by: John Manners
- Succeeded by: Henry V. Speer

Member of the New Jersey Senate from Mercer County
- In office 1851–1857
- Preceded by: Charles S. Olden
- Succeeded by: Robert C. Hutchinson

Personal details
- Born: May 20, 1806 Prince Edward County, Virginia
- Died: August 23, 1874 (aged 68)
- Party: Democratic
- Parent(s): Archibald Alexander; Janetta Waddel
- Relatives: James Waddel Alexander (brother); Joseph Addison Alexander (brother)
- Education: Princeton University

William Cowper Alexander (May 20, 1806 – August 23, 1874) was an American lawyer, politician, and insurance executive. He served as President of the New Jersey State Senate and as President of the Equitable Life Assurance Society.

== Early life ==
Alexander was born in 1806 in Prince Edward County, Virginia, the second son of noted Presbyterian theologian Archibald Alexander and his wife Janetta Waddel. His elder brother James Waddel Alexander (1804–1859) would also become a Presbyterian theologian and minister. Another brother, Joseph Addison Alexander (1809–1860), would become a biblical scholar.

Alexander's father was president of Hampden-Sydney College in Virginia before being called to serve as minister of the Third Presbyterian Church in Philadelphia in 1807. The family then moved to Princeton, New Jersey when Archibald Alexander was named the first professor of the Princeton Theological Seminary in 1812.

Alexander graduated from the College of New Jersey (now Princeton University) in 1824 and was admitted to the bar of New Jersey as an attorney in 1828. He opened an office in Princeton and attended to his professional business there for about thirty years. He also joined the militia company known as the Princeton Blues and achieved the rank of colonel.

== Political career ==
Alexander never obtained his license as counsellor and took a greater interest in politics than law. He entered the New Jersey General Assembly in 1836 as a Democrat from Middlesex County (before the formation of Mercer County). In 1851 he succeeded Charles Smith Olden as a member of the New Jersey Senate from Mercer County, serving as president of that body for four terms.

In 1856 he was drafted to run as the Democratic candidate for Governor of New Jersey. He lost to the Republican candidate William A. Newell by less than 3,000 votes.

Alexander was a delegate to the 1860 Democratic National Convention and at the second convention in Baltimore he received one vote for the vice presidency. He was a delegate to the Peace Conference of 1861, after which time he withdrew from political life and devoted himself to a career as a life insurance executive.

== Business career ==
Alexander was chosen president of the Equitable Life Assurance Society when it was organized in 1859. His brother, Presbyterian minister James Waddel Alexander, had become the patron of Equitable founder Henry Baldwin Hyde, and many of the company's original directors were members of Alexander's Fifth Avenue Presbyterian Church.

Alexander did not assume an active role in management of Equitable business, leaving that to the much younger Hyde, who was named vice president and manager. Alexander served as president until his death at his New York City residence in 1874 at the age of 68. He was succeeded by Hyde and then by his nephew James Waddell Alexander (1839–1915) after Hyde's death in 1899.

Alexander never married. He was buried in the family plot at Princeton Cemetery.

Political offices
Preceded by John Manners	President of the New Jersey Senate; 1853–1856	Succeeded by Henry V. Speer
Party political offices
Preceded by Rodman M. Price	Democratic Nominee for Governor of New Jersey; 1856	Succeeded by Edwin R. V. Wright
