= Charles Skelton =

American politician (1806–1879)

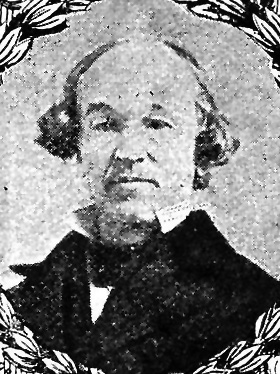

Member of the U.S. House of Representatives from New Jersey's 2nd district
- In office March 4, 1851 – March 3, 1855
- Preceded by: William A. Newell
- Succeeded by: George R. Robbins

Personal details
- Born: April 19, 1806 Buckingham Township, Bucks County, Pennsylvania, U.S.
- Died: May 20, 1879 (aged 73) Trenton, New Jersey, U.S.
- Resting place: City Cemetery in Hamilton Square, New Jersey
- Party: Democratic
- Profession: politician

Charles Skelton (April 19, 1806 – May 20, 1879) was an American Democratic Party politician who represented New Jersey's 2nd congressional district in the United States House of Representatives from 1851 to 1855.

== Biography ==
Skelton was born in Buckingham Township, Bucks County, Pennsylvania on April 19, 1806. He moved to Trenton, New Jersey about 1829, where he attended the country schools and Trenton Academy.

=== Early career ===
He engaged in mercantile pursuits, and moved to Philadelphia in 1835. He graduated from Jefferson Medical College at Philadelphia in 1838 and commenced the practice of his profession in that city. He returned to Trenton in 1841, and was superintendent of the Trenton Public Schools in 1848.

=== Congress ===
He was elected as a Democrat to the Thirty-second and Thirty-third Congresses, serving in office from March 4, 1851 to March 3, 1855.

=== Later career and death ===
After leaving Congress, he was a member of the common council from 1873-1875. He died in Trenton on May 20, 1879, and was interred in City Cemetery in Hamilton Square, New Jersey.

=== Family history ===
Skelton's uncle Abraham Doan was a member of the infamous Doan Outlaws, and was executed for his role as a Tory during the American Revolution. Skelton's grandfather Israel Doan was imprisoned for aiding the gang and probably died in jail.

U.S. House of Representatives
Preceded by William A. Newell	Member of the U.S. House of Representatives from New Jersey's 2nd congressional district March 4, 1851 – March 3, 1855	Succeeded by George R. Robbins
