= Christ Church (Norfolk, Virginia) =

Historic church in Virginia, United States

- Formerly listed on the U.S. National Register of Historic Places
- Virginia Landmarks Register
- Location: 421 E. Freemason St., Norfolk, Virginia
- Area: 1 acre (0.40 ha)
- Built: 1828
- Architect: Swain, Levi; Williamson, Thomas
- Architectural style: Greek Revival
- NRHP reference No.: 71001064
- VLR No.: 122-0004

Significant dates
- Added to NRHP: August 19, 1971
- Designated VLR
- Removed from NRHP: May 22, 1973

Christ Church was a historic Episcopal church located at Norfolk, Virginia. It was built in 1828, and was a one-story, temple form church in the Greek Revival style. It was fronted by a distyle portico with two unfluted Greek Doric order columns. It measured approximately 64 feet by 96 feet, and featured a cupola with octagonal belfry. The congregations roots can be traced back to 1637. In 1798, the congregation of Borough Church split into two factions, with the other being Saint Paul's Episcopal Church. Christ Church merged their congregation with St. Luke's in 1910, and the building housed a Greek Orthodox congregation until 1955. It was demolished in January 1973.

It was listed on the National Register of Historic Places in 1971 and delisted in 1973.
