= Pi Kappa Alpha =

North American collegiate fraternity

- ΠΚΑ
- Founded: March 1, 1868; 158 years ago University of Virginia
- Type: Social
- Affiliation: NIC
- Status: Active
- Scope: North America
- Motto: "Once a Pike, always a Pike"
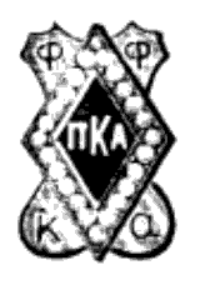
- Member badge
- Colors: Garnet and Old Gold
- Symbol: Shield, diamond, dagger, and key
- Flag
- Flower: Lily of the Valley
- Tree: Oak
- Jewel: Diamond
- Mascot: White horse
- Publication: Shield and Diamond
- Chapters: 225
- Members: 310,000+ lifetime
- Nickname: Pikes, Pikas
- Headquarters: 8347 West Range Cove; Memphis, Tennessee 38125; United States
- Website: www.pikes.org

Pi Kappa Alpha (ΠΚΑ), commonly known as PIKE, is a college fraternity founded at the University of Virginia in 1868. The fraternity has over 225 chapters and provisional chapters across the United States and abroad. With roughly 15,000 undergraduate members and over 310,000 lifetime initiates, Pi Kappa Alpha is one of the largest North American social fraternities.

== History ==
Pi Kappa Alpha was founded on March 1, 1868, in Room 47 in West Range (The Range) at the University of Virginia by six graduate students: William Alexander, Littleton Waller Tazewell Bradford, Robertson Howard, James Benjamin Sclater Jr., Frederick Southgate Taylor, and Julian Edward Wood.

Three of the Founders had been former cadets, having served on both sides of the recently concluded Civil War. One had been a Union hospital officer, another a Confederate veteran, and a third, a repatriate. Expansion was considered early in the fraternity's history; on March 1, 1869, exactly one year after the Alpha chapter at the University of Virginia was formed, the Beta chapter of Pi Kappa Alpha was founded at Davidson College. Its Gamma chapter was placed at William and Mary just two years later, and a total of seven chapters formed in the first decade. This period of early growth slowed though, and by 1889 only four chapters remained active.

A call for a national convention was sent out, and delegates of three of the four active chapters met in what would become the "junior founding" of the fraternity at what they called the Hampden–Sydney Convention, held in a dorm room at Hampden–Sydney College. This marked the start of a new wave of prosperity and substantial growth and the end of almost a decade of decline. Theta chapter, at Rhodes College, took over the responsibilities of Alpha chapter, granting chapters for a short period before this duty was taken over by an administrative office. John Shaw Foster, a junior founder from Theta chapter, helped to reestablish Alpha chapter at the University of Virginia. Theta chapter is the longest continual-running chapter of Pi Kappa Alpha, having been founded in 1878. The four delegates to the Hampden–Sydney Convention are referred to as the Junior Founders.

Pi Kappa Alpha was not originally organized as a sectional fraternity; however, by constitutional provision it became so in 1889, and for twenty years would only open chapters south of the Mason-Dixon Line.

Pi Kappa Alpha members have supported the nation's armed conflicts in large numbers. In World War I, one out of every six members of the fraternity served in uniform. In World War II, 15,000 of its 33,000 active members served, including General Courtney Hodges, a four-star general and commander of the US First Army in Europe.

Sectarian and other restrictions that were in place during the early years have since been modified or removed entirely: Pi Kappa Alpha remained a southern fraternity until the New Orleans Convention in 1909 when the fraternity officially declared itself a national organization. Like many other social fraternities at the time, Pi Kappa Alpha had limited its membership to white males. All race restrictions were removed in 1964.

As of 2024, Pi Kappa Alpha has initiated more than 310,000 members. The fraternity's headquarters are in Memphis, Tennessee.

== Symbols ==
The fraternity's rituals were based on those of Independent Order of Odd Fellows. Its colors are garnet and old gold. Its symbols are the shield, diamond, dagger, and key. Its flower is the lily of the valley. Its tree is the Oak. Its mascot is the White Horse. Its jewel is the Diamond.

Shield & Diamond is the official quarterly publication of Pi Kappa Alpha. It was first printed in December 1890 by Robert Adger Smythe, who was then Grand Secretary and Treasurer, under the name The Pi Kappa Alpha Journal. The name was changed to Shield & Diamond in 1891.

The fraternity's nickname is PIKE and its members are called Pikes.

== Activities ==
=== PIKE University ===
PIKE University, also known as PIKE U, is the name used for all of the fraternity's leadership programs. Events and initiatives are administered by the fraternity's professional staff. It was founded in 1948 as a 501(c)(3) tax-exempt organization for charitable, literary & educational purposes. Events include the International Convention (every two years), the Academy (every non-Convention year), the Chapter Executives Conference, and several regional Leadership Summits. PIKE University grants more than $100,000 in scholarships each year.

=== PIKE Foundation ===
In 1948, Pi Kappa Alpha established and chartered the "Pi Kappa Alpha Memorial Foundation" as a 501(c)(3) organization. The foundation grants $350,000 in scholarships and grants to undergraduate members each year. It also provides funding to the fraternity and its chapters for leadership programs, scholarships, and chapter house facilities. The foundation grants initiation fee scholarships to undergraduates inducted into Phi Beta Kappa, Omicron Delta Kappa, Order of Omega, Phi Kappa Phi, and Tau Beta Pi honoraries.

The Pike Foundation also maintains and operates the Memorial Headquarters in Memphis, Tennessee. This facility houses professional staff, the Harvey T. Newell Library, and the Freeman Hart Museum. The building is a war memorial built in 1988 to recognize the military services of members who died in the line of duty. A Gold Star Memorial was dedicated on August 1, 2008.

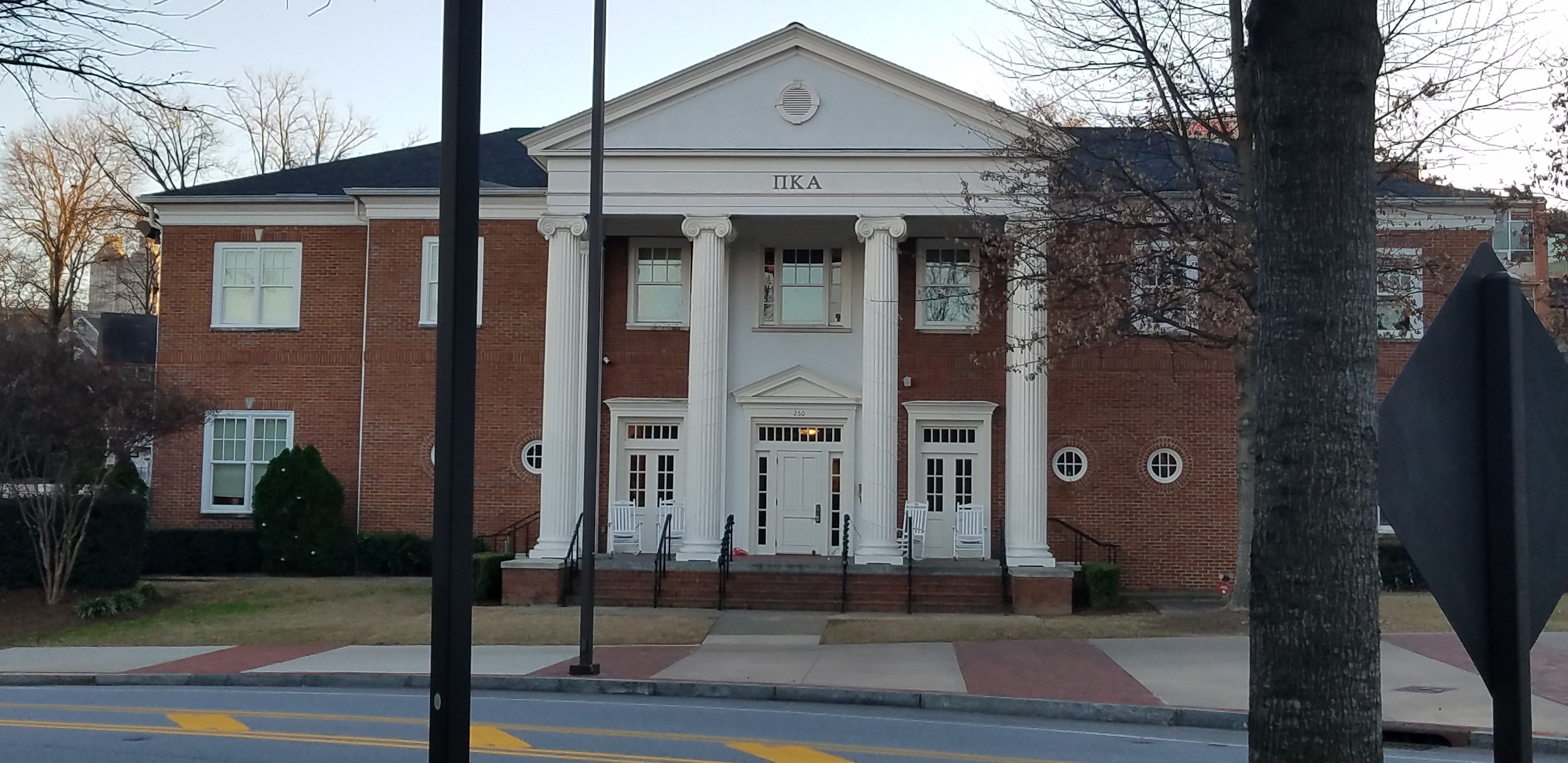
Pi Kappa Alpha at the Georgia Institute of Technology

== Chapter and member misconduct ==
Despite policies put in place by the national fraternity to curtail hazing behavior, local chapters have been involved in events which lead to deaths, sexual assault, and other misconduct.

=== Hazing deaths ===
- Samuel Mark Click, a pledge at Texas Tech University, was killed by a train while participating in a scavenger hunt as part of a hazing event in 1976.
- In 2002, Albert Santos, a pledge at the University of Nevada at Reno, drowned in a lake during a hazing ritual. He and several pledges were told to swim in a lake in their underwear; Santos could not swim.
- In 2012, Pi Kappa Alpha pledge David Bogenberger died of a cardiac arrhythmia triggered by alcohol poisoning. According to police, Bogenberger and other pledges were pressured into drinking large quantities of alcohol in a two-hour time at an unsanctioned Northern Illinois University event. Bogenberger and 18 other pledges drank to unconsciousness. Five fraternity officers and seventeen other members were convicted of misdemeanors in one of the largest hazing prosecutions in U.S. history. The chapter was suspended by the fraternity.
- In March 2021, fraternity pledge Stone Foltz died at the hospital due to alcohol intoxication after being forced to consume a fifth of Evan Williams whiskey. Eight members of the Delta Beta chapter at Bowling Green State University were criminally charged with first-degree felony involuntary manslaughter, reckless homicide, felonious assault, hazing, failure to comply with underage alcohol laws, and obstructing official business, third-degree felony involuntary manslaughter, tampering with evidence, and obstructing justice. The international fraternity expelled all of the undergraduate members and revoked the chapter's charter. In 2023, the parents of Stone Foltz filed a lawsuit against Bowling Green State for the wrongful death of their son.

=== Sexual assault ===
- In 1988, three members of the Florida State University chapter were charged with the sexual battery of a freshman female student. Also in 1988 several members of Pi Kappa Alpha were arrested for a sexual assault that took place at Stetson University.
- In 2008, ten Pike members were arrested at Tulane University for pouring boiling water on pledges; the chapter was also accused of drugging and sexually assaulting several female students at the fraternity's annual bacchanal.
- Florida International University suspended the fraternity in 2013 after the discovery of photos on Facebook of hazing and drug deals, as well as sexually explicit photos of women taken without their consent.
- In 2015, the Utah State University chapter president was charged with forcible sexual abuse, a felony, after allegedly inappropriately touching a female student who passed out at a party.
- In 2023, the Montana State University chapter was placed on probation by the university for reports of sexual assault; the chapter was suspended for sexual assault in 2013.

=== Other incidents ===
- In 2014, the leaders of the University of Arkansas chapter were asked to resign following an unauthorized Martin Luther King, Jr. Day party that incorporated racist stereotypes.
- The University of Southern Mississippi chapter was closed from 2014 to 2018, following a hazing incident that led to the death of two mated flamingos that pledges stole from the local zoo.
- In May 2017, the California State University, Chico chapter was charged with illegally cutting down 32 trees in the Lassen National Forest during an initiation of new pledges. They were also charged with possession of a firearm and conspiracy to commit an offense or defraud the United States. The chapter was sentenced to 9,800 hours of community service and a $4,000 fine after pleading guilty in the U.S. District Court.
- In 2021, seven members of the University of Mississippi chapter were arrested for hazing a pledge who was told to ingest bleach, resulting in Grade 4 erosive esophagitis.
- In 2023, the University of Arkansas chapter was suspended after a hazing video leaked on social media. The video leaked showed a pledge kneeling before an altar, holding another pledge's hands while fraternity members chanted and beat the kneeling pledges with a paddle.

== See also ==
- List of social fraternities
