= University of Virginia fraternities and sororities =

American Greek life system

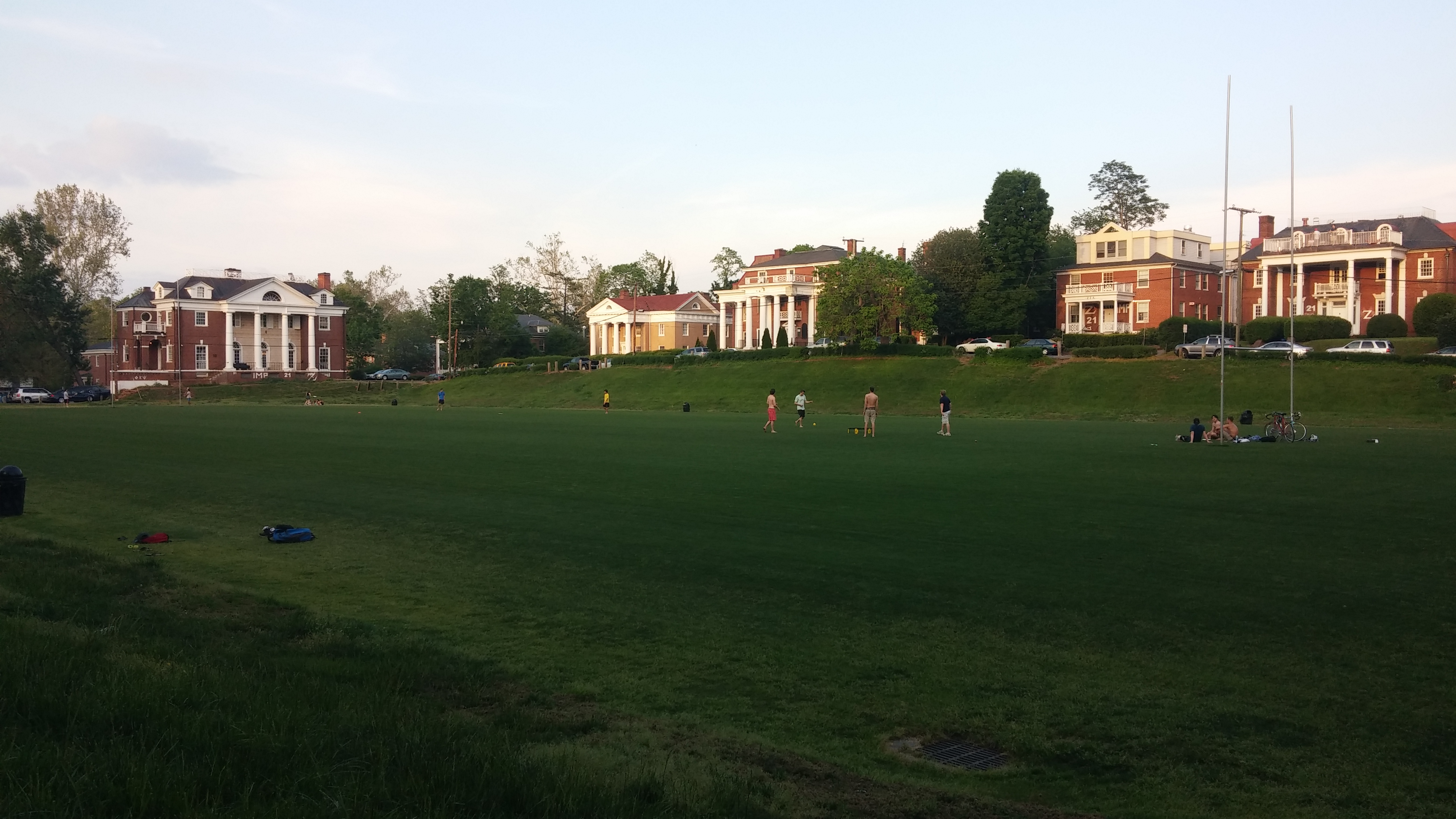
Madison Bowl at the University of Virginia is surrounded by several Greek houses. Visible from left to right are Phi Kappa Psi, Sigma Alpha Epsilon, St. Anthony Hall, Sigma Phi Epsilon, Zeta Tau Alpha, and St. Elmo Hall.

The University of Virginia in Charlottesville, Virginia had numerous fraternities and sororities. Since the establishment of several social fraternities in the 1850s, the university's student organizations have expanded to include sororities, professional organizations, service fraternities, honor fraternities, and cultural organizations. Fraternities and sororities have been significant to the history of the University of Virginia, including the founding of what a now national fraternities: Kappa Sigma (ΚΣ) and Pi Kappa Alpha (ΠΚΑ).

Roughly thirty percent of the student body belongs to a social fraternity or sorority, with additional students involved in professional, service, and honor fraternities. Many of the university's fraternities and sororities are residential, meaning they own or rent a house for their members to use; many of these houses are located on Rugby Road and the surrounding streets, just north of the university. Additionally, three social fraternities hold reserved rooms on the Lawn and the Range: Kappa Sigma in Room 46 East Lawn, Trigon Engineering Society in Room 17 West Lawn, and Pi Kappa Alpha in Room 47 West Range. Various NPHC and MGC organizations also have Lawn rooms of historical relevance to their particular chapters as well.

Reflecting UVA's tradition of student self-governance, the system is currently governed by four Greek Councils consisting of student leaders; however, it is also overseen by the Department of Fraternity and Sorority Life in the university's Office of the Dean of Students.

== History ==
Fraternities were first founded at UVA a few decades after the school's establishment in 1819. Before this time, social life at the university was fixed around debating societies; the now-defunct Patrick Henry Society, for instance, initially had a membership nearly equal to the size of the student body. In the 1850s, the first fraternities began to appear and assumed a significant role in the student body's social landscape. In the following decades, the university became the birthplace of two national fraternities and saw many more fraternity chapters chartered. The twentieth century saw the system expand even more to include professional fraternities, social sororities, local fraternities, and black fraternities and sororities. Moving into the 2000s, several new social organizations were founded, including multicultural organizations.

=== 1800s: debating and secret societies ===
Members of the Jefferson Society, a university debating society, stand in front of the Rotunda.

For several decades following the founding of the university, the major student societies on grounds were the debating societies. Several of these societies, notably the Jefferson Literary and Debating Society and the Washington Literary Society and Debating Union, are still active today. These and other debating societies that are no longer in existence, such as the Philomathean Society and the Parthenon Society, served as the primary means of student societal activity in the early days of the university.

In the decade before the Civil War, eleven fraternities established chapters at the university. The first was Delta Kappa Epsilon, or DKE (ΔΚΕ), which was founded in 1852 as a "secret" colony and remains active to this day. Faculty were originally against the creation of fraternities due to years of riotous behavior among the students and attacks upon faculty. According to University historian Philip Alexander Bruce, the faculty feared the "orderly spirit of the student body acting as a whole or in segments, whether organized into secret fraternities or Calathumpian bands." Despite these objections, however, a chapter of DKE was founded, and other fraternities followed. It can be said generally about the early UVA fraternities that the only "secret" aspect of them was their operation and meeting location; the membership was not kept secret. As is the case with most modern fraternities, the original fraternities on grounds were meant to provide social engagement and promote close ties between members.

Fraternity growth was interrupted by the Civil War, as men from many Southern colleges halted their studies to join the Confederate army. Many fraternity chapters ceased to exist during this time, but some students made efforts to preserve their fraternities as the war continued. Harry St. John Dixon, a member of Sigma Chi from the University of Virginia, joined with four other Sigma Chi brothers from other universities to form the Constantine chapter of the fraternity. Created in 1864, this chapter was meant to preserve the bonds of the fraternity during the war, promote ties between the North and South, and ensure the fraternity's continued existence.

The expansion of fraternity life resumed after the war; by 1892, there were eighteen fraternities on grounds. Fraternities began to share the social spotlight with ribbon societies at the university, which was founded in reaction to the fraternities' social exclusivity. The ribbon societies, such as Eli Banana and T.I.L.K.A., were originally meant to increase social involvement among students, but eventually took on a political role in the university as well. They became particularly prestigious, mainly pulling their membership from fraternities, and election to their societies was considered a high honor. Despite this social competition, fraternities continued to grow at the university.

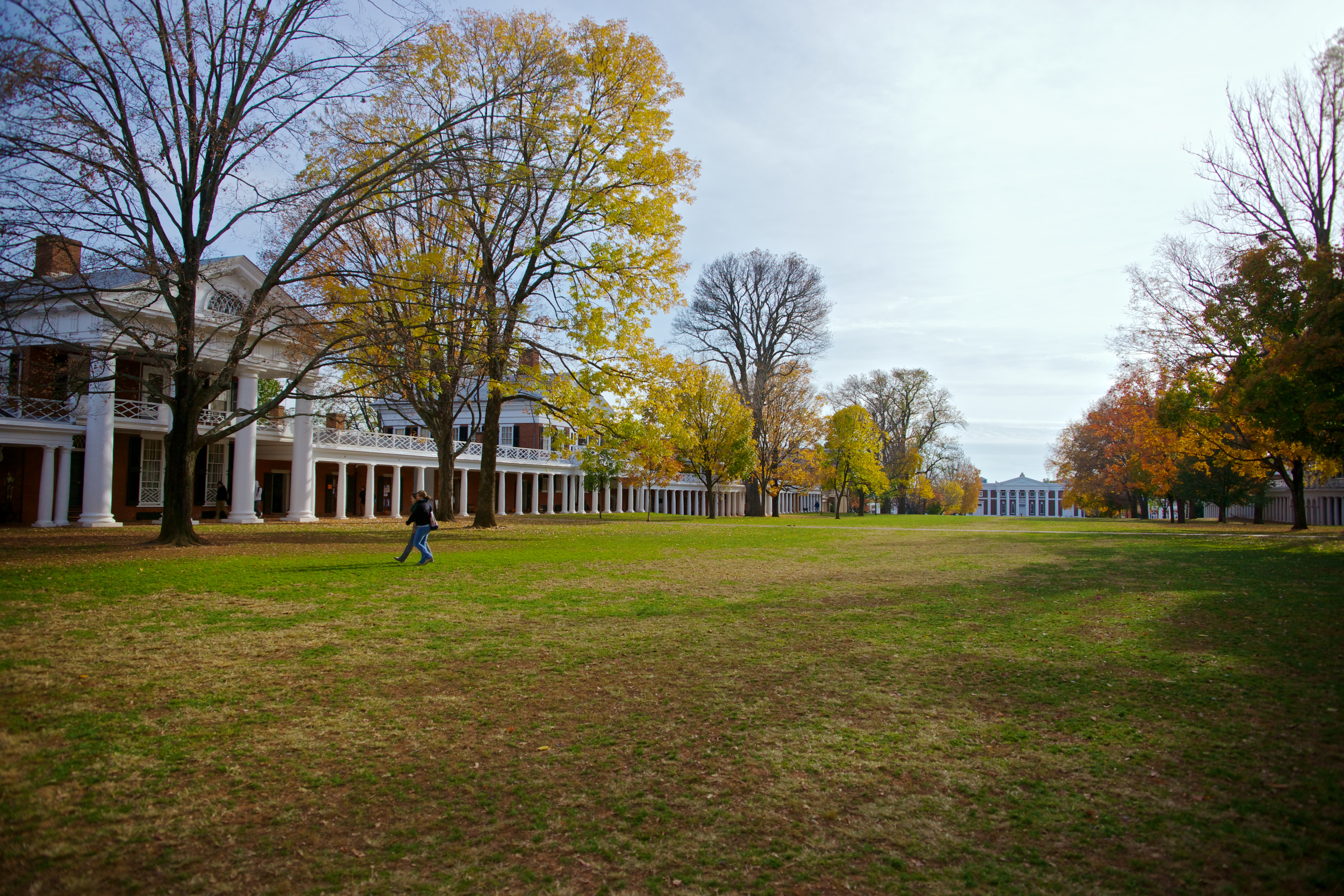
The Lawn and the adjacent Range were the founding locations of Kappa Sigma and Pi Kappa Alpha.

=== 1868: founding of Pi Kappa Alpha ===
Pi Kappa Alpha was founded on Sunday evening March 1, 1868, at 47 West Range at the University of Virginia, by Robertson Howard, Julian Edward Wood, James Benjamin Sclater Jr., Frederick Southgate Taylor, Littleton Waller Tazewell Bradford and William Alexander. On March 1, 1869, exactly one year after the Alpha chapter at the University of Virginia was formed, the Beta chapter of Pi Kappa Alpha was founded at Davidson College. Expanding the fraternity proved difficult because the Civil War disorganized many Southern colleges, and many colleges banned the formation of secret societies.

After almost a decade of decline, Pi Kappa Alpha was re-founded as part of the Hampden-Sydney Convention, held in a dorm room at Hampden–Sydney College. Pi Kappa Alpha was not originally organized as a sectional fraternity; however, by constitutional provision it became so in 1889. It remained a Southern fraternity until the New Orleans Convention in 1909, when Pi Kappa Alpha officially declared itself a national organization. Originally, Pi Kappa Alpha's membership was restricted to white men, but the race restriction was removed in 1964.

=== 1869: founding of Kappa Sigma ===
On December 10, 1869, five students at the University of Virginia met in 46 East Lawn and founded the Kappa Sigma fraternity. William Grigsby McCormick, George Miles Arnold, John Covert Boyd, Edmund Law Rogers, Jr., and Frank Courtney Nicodemus established the fraternity based on the traditions of the Kirjath Sepher, an ancient order at the University of Bologna in the Middle Ages. These five founders became collectively known as the "Five Friends and Brothers." In 1872, Kappa Sigma initiated Stephen Alonzo Jackson, who would go on to transform the struggling local fraternity into a strong international Brotherhood. In 1873, thanks to Jackson's work, Kappa Sigma expanded to Trinity College (now Duke University), the University of Maryland, and Washington and Lee University. Since then, Kappa Sigma has become a large international fraternity with over 300 active chapters and colonies in North America.

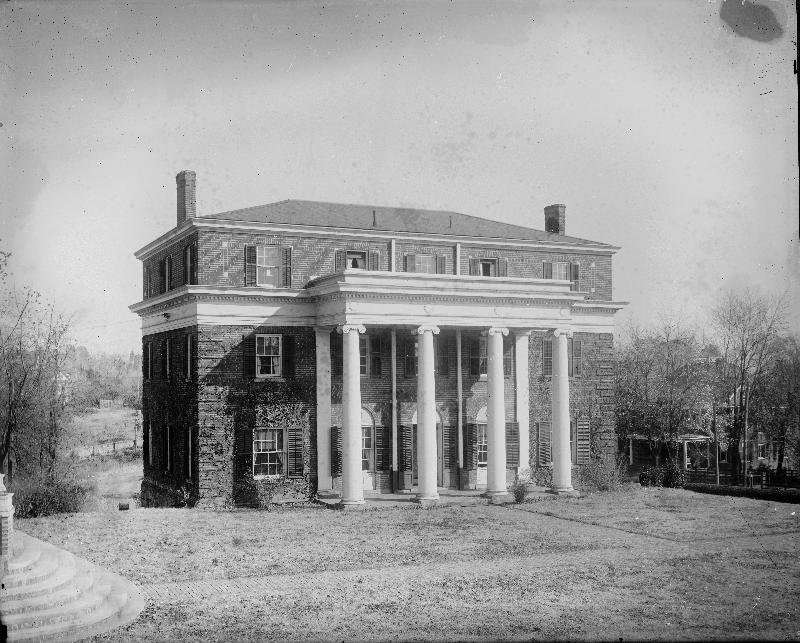
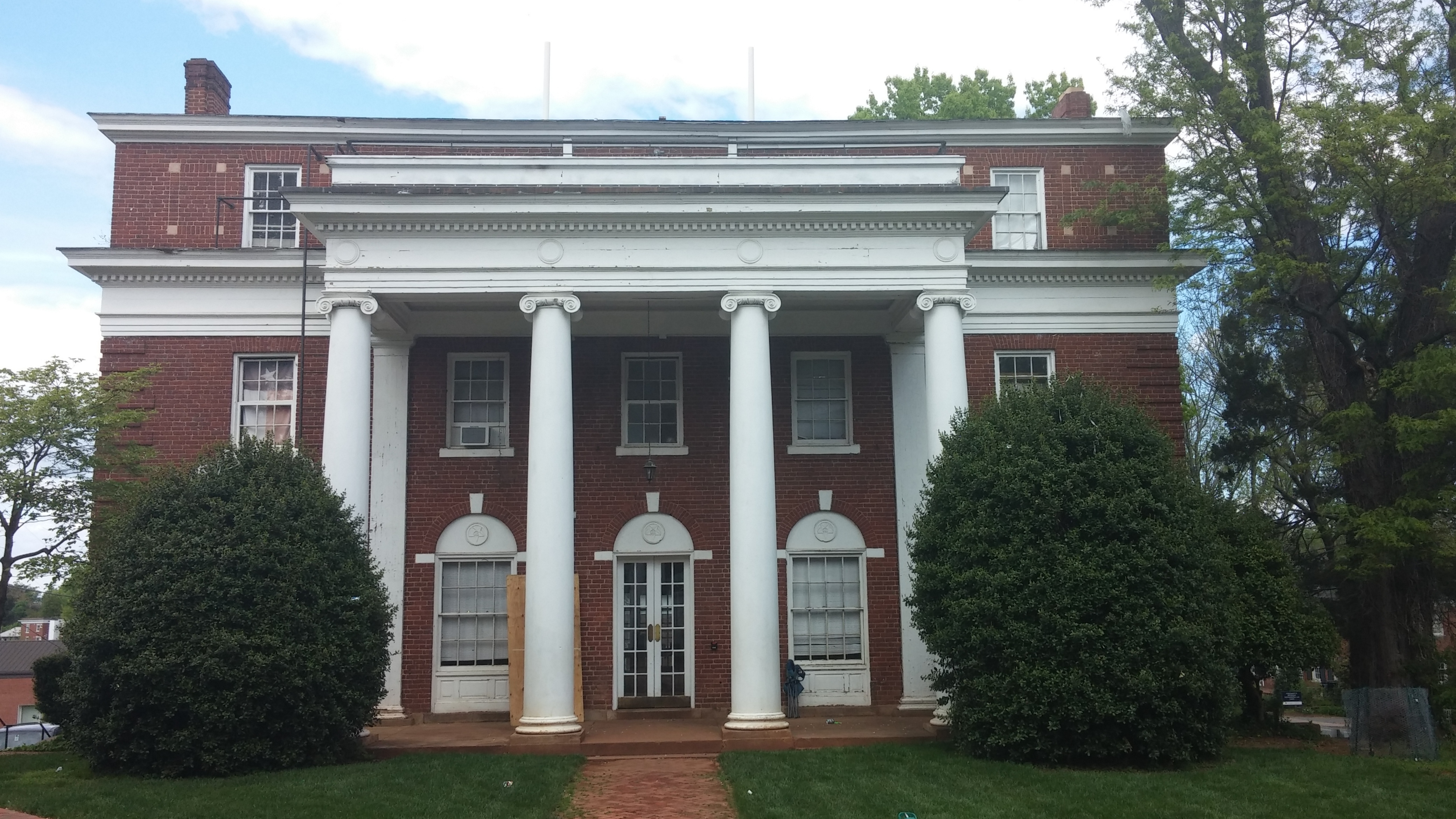
Kappa Sigma house, taken in 1917 (above); the same house in the present day (below)

=== Early 1900s: residences, professional and women's fraternities ===
In the beginning of the twentieth century the fraternity system continued to expand at such a rapid pace that university newspapers questioned if the increase in the number of fraternities would ever end. Many fraternity chapters were founded during this time that no longer exist at the university, such Alpha Chi Rho, Theta Nu Epsilon, and Delta Chi. Other chapters that are still active were founded at this time as well, such as Theta Chi and Phi Sigma Kappa.

Also, during this time, fraternities began to purchase and construct houses. During the late 1800s, fraternities did not have dedicated houses; instead, they inhabited residential areas scattered around grounds, such as Dawson's Row near the Lawn and boarding houses north of the university. In 1908, the university's Board of Visitors first offered a land lease and a $12,000 loan to Kappa Sigma to construct a fraternity house, and many other fraternities followed. Most of these were located just north of the Rotunda, on Rugby Road, Madison Lane, University Place, and the surrounding streets. Some of these houses cost up to $20,000 to build, and many drew inspiration from historic UVA buildings or residences of the Old South, using elements of Jeffersonian architecture. Two houses were even styled to closely resemble famous buildings in the area, with Zeta Psi's house modeled after Monticello and Farmington, and Phi Kappa Psi's house modeled after Carr's Hill. By 1916, most fraternities had built, purchased, or rented a house for their members.

Around the turn of the century, scholastic honor organizations appeared on grounds. The university chapter of Phi Beta Kappa (ΠΒΚ) was founded in 1908, promoting scholarship in all fields of study. Different schools had specific honor and professional societies as well: Phi Delta Phi (ΦΔΦ) for the law department, Phi Rho Sigma (ΦΡΣ) for medicine, Kappa Delta Mu for chemistry, and many others. A chapter of Theta Tau (ΘΤ), an engineering society, was founded in 1923, and Trigon Engineering Society was founded in 1924 as a local fraternity for engineering students. Trigon and Theta Tau dominated student government in the Engineering School during this time, often fielding competing candidates for student office. Likewise in the university's College of Arts and Sciences, the University Party and the Cavalier Party were dominated by Lambda Pi and Skull & Keys.

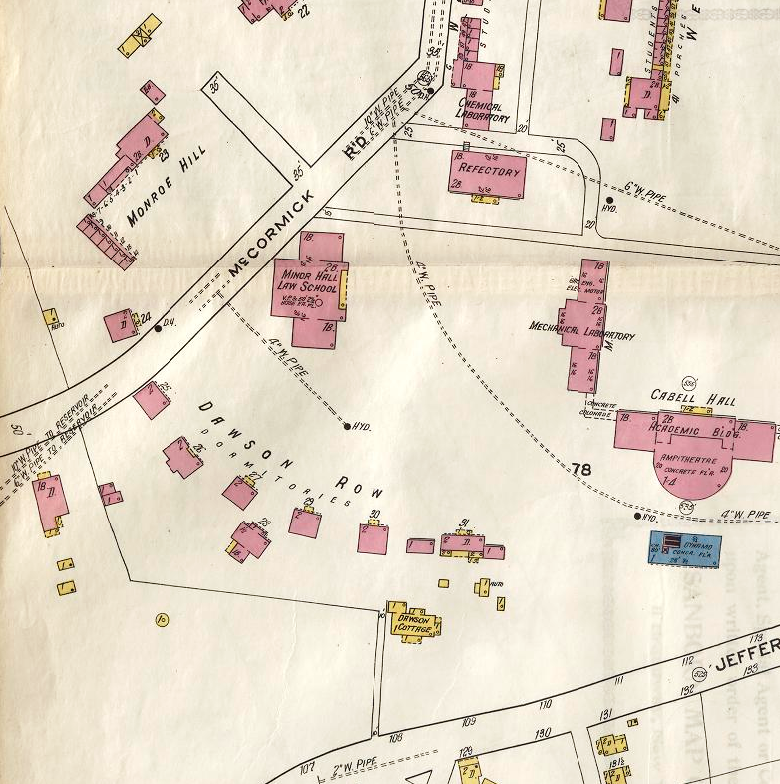
This 1907 Sanborn Map shows Dawson's Row at the University of Virginia, southwest of the Lawn. In the late 1800s, several fraternities inhabited houses along Dawson's Row before the construction of dedicated fraternity houses.

It was during the first half of the twentieth century that the first women's fraternities were established. The university first admitted women to graduate programs in 1920, although undergraduate women were not allowed at the university until much later. With these graduate women came several organizations for women, referred to alternately as sororities or women's fraternities. The first sorority to establish a chapter at the university was Chi Omega (ΧΩ), whose chapter was founded in 1927. A Kappa Delta (ΚΔ) chapter followed in 1932, and a chapter of Zeta Tau Alpha (ΖΤΑ) was established twenty years later in 1952.

In 1947, with the inauguration of Colgate Darden as president of the university, first-year students were prohibited from joining fraternities and sororities. This restriction was later eased to a one-semester prohibition, which is still in place today. During this time only 20 percent of students were members of the 24 fraternities on grounds. Darden was critical of the fraternities' behavior, arguing in a 1949 report to the Board of Visitors that the groups had failed to uphold the interests of the university community and to provide the leadership expected of them.

Additionally, university leaders condemned the fraternities' treatment of their houses, which were extremely run down. Members would often solicit tens of thousands of dollars in donations from alumni to refurbish houses, only to see the improvements disappear within a few years. Despite the administrators' concerns, this problem was not addressed until 1983, when the university created the Historic Renovation Corporation, or HRC. The HRC, which later became a subsidiary of the UVA Foundation, renovates and manages the properties of several fraternity and sorority houses.

=== Late 1900s ===
==== Easters ====
The 1970s saw great upheaval as fraternities, whose membership had been waning, began to increase in size. In 1973, nearly 45 percent of freshmen joined fraternities, the highest percentage in school history, and with this increased membership, disruptive behavior increased on campus. In the 1970s the annual tradition of Easters' parties, which began in the 1800s as formal dances sponsored by the ribbon societies, had evolved into a weekend-long celebration where fraternities would flood Mad Bowl and the surrounding areas, creating huge mud pits for the event. By 1976, it was estimated that 15,000 people had come from up and down the East Coast to fill the Mad Bowl. Students washing off mud led to clogged drainage systems in the university, and entire dorms were flooded. Eventually, the event became so unmanageable that, in 1982, the university terminated Easters.

==== African Americans ====
African Americans were originally admitted to the university in the mid-1950s, but few attended until the 1970s; fraternities at this time were generally racially and religiously segregated. Although a student fraternity committee emphasized the fraternities' rejection of racial discrimination, in 1969, only 5 of 578 fraternity pledges were black. African-American fraternities and sororities soon established chapters at the university, although they presented themselves as service organizations rather than traditional social organizations. In the mid-1970s, although some Black students were invited to join the heavily white fraternities, many preferred to join their organizations. By the fall of 1973, four Black fraternities, the Lambda Zeta chapter of Omega Psi Phi (ΩΨΦ), the Eta Sigma chapter of Kappa Alpha Psi (ΚΑΨ), the Iota Beta chapter of Alpha Phi Alpha (ΑΦΑ), and the Zeta Eta chapter of Phi Beta Sigma (ΦΒΣ), and one Black sorority, the Kappa Rho chapter of Delta Sigma Theta (ΔΣΘ), had established chapters on grounds.

==== Women ====
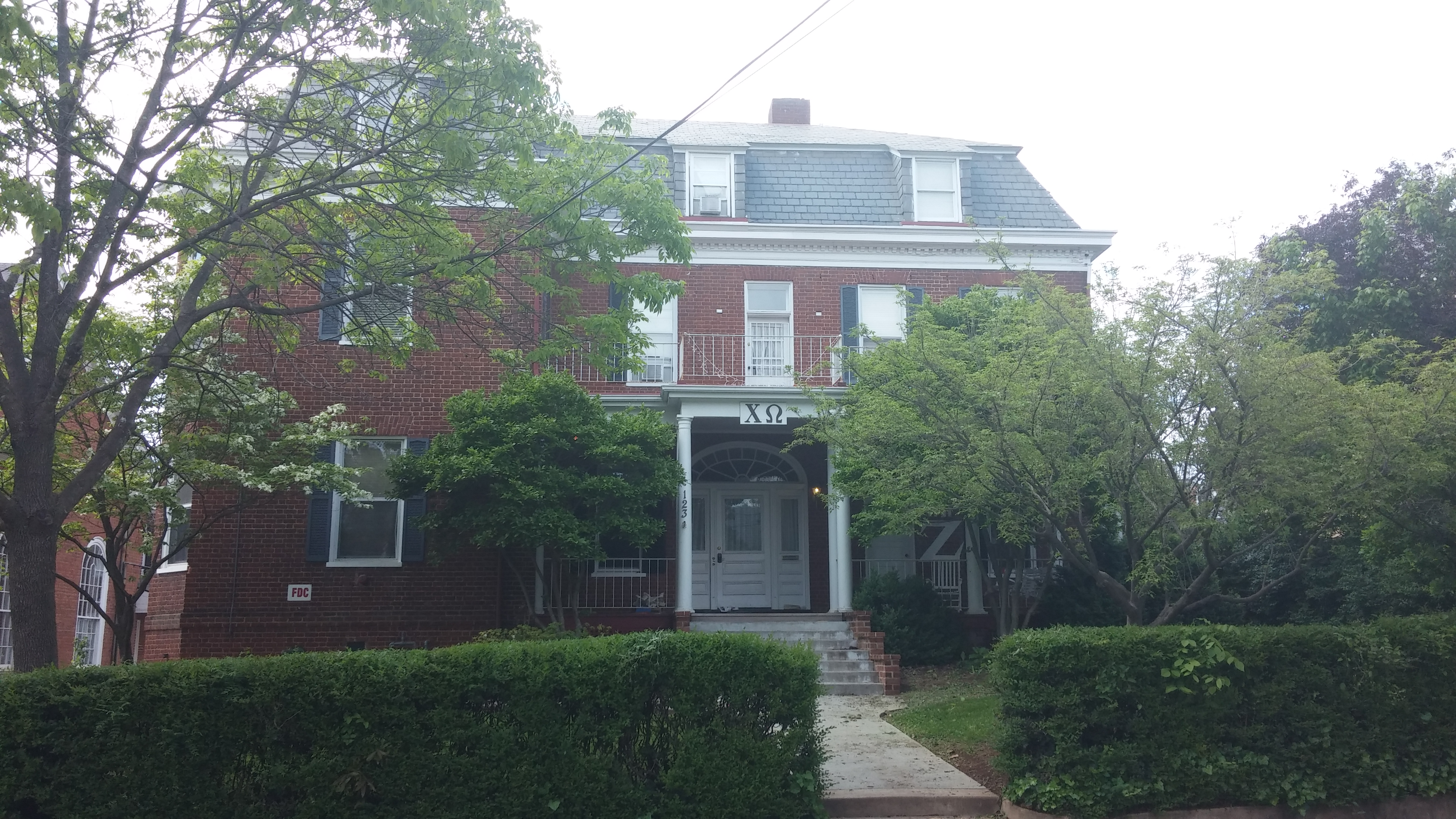
Chi Omega house

In 1970, the College of Arts and Sciences allowed the first women to enroll in its undergraduate programs, which effectively made the university coeducational. This led to the rapid establishment of many social sororities at the university, and by the end of the 1970s, there were eleven sorority chapters at the university, with still more chartered in the 1980s.

In 1975, the sororities established the Inter-Sorority Council, or ISC, to govern the increasing number of sororities on grounds. The ISC was founded to continue the tradition of student self-governance and was similar to the university's Inter-Fraternity Council (IFC) in its function. The organization was named the Inter-Sorority Council to mimic the name of the Inter-Fraternity Council, which fraternities had established in 1934; this was meant to emphasize sorority women's equality with fraternity men. Later, in 2005, the ISC voted to formally associate with the National Panhellenic Conference, the national governing body of social sororities. Despite this change, the ISC at the university retained its name due to its historical heritage.

=== 2000 onward: multicultural fraternities ===
The first decade of the 2000s saw a quick rise in the number of multicultural organizations at UVA. In 1999, the first Latina and Asian-interest sorority chapters were founded at UVA, Omega Phi Beta (ΩΦΒ) and alpha Kappa Delta Phi (αΚΔΦ), respectively. The university's first Latino fraternity, a chapter of Lambda Upsilon Lambda (ΛΥΛ), was founded later that same year. These three organizations founded the Fraternity-Sorority Council, which was meant to organize the newly created multicultural organizations; in 2000, this group was renamed the Multicultural Greek Council, or MGC, and the council exists to this day. With the creation of additional cultural fraternities and sororities, the MGC has grown to a total of eleven organizations.

In 2002, the IFC decided to admit local fraternities, fraternities that are not affiliated with a national organization, for the first time (although local fraternities had existed at UVA before this time, they had not been permitted to join the IFC). Two years prior, when the Phi Delta Theta (ΦΔΘ) national organization decided to ban alcohol consumption in its chapter houses, the UVA chapter broke away from its national organization and created local organization Phi Delta Alpha, which was later renamed Phi Society. After debate within the IFC, Phi Society was admitted and recognized by the university as a local fraternity. Phi Society is viewed as the continuation of the Phi Delta Theta fraternity that existed before 2000 and maintains the same house. In 2001, Phi Delta Theta established another chapter at the university that adheres to its directives concerning alcohol consumption. The Greek system's expansion to new groups continued in 2015, as local fraternity Sigma Omicron Rho became the first gender-inclusive and LGBTQ fraternity to be recognized by the university, with the organization later on rebranding itself as a diaternity during its process of getting incorporated.

== Governance ==
=== University recognition ===
University policy prevents national fraternities and sororities from directly establishing a chapter at the university; instead, an interested group of students must establish an interest group, petition for the establishment, and obtain sponsorship from one of the Greek councils. Once sponsorship is obtained, a group enters the provisional phase of the process; at this point the interest group may contact a national fraternity or sorority to begin the process of establishing themselves as a colony or chapter. Upon successful completion of the provisional phase, the organization is granted full membership in its chosen Greek council.

To maintain a formal relationship with the university, each organization must annually complete a Fraternal Organization Agreement (FOA). Fraternal organizations can exist without signing an FOA; however, signing an FOA grants additional benefits to organizations, including the ability to use certain university spaces and to join a Greek council.

=== Greek councils ===
Several councils at the University of Virginia oversee the functions of their member organizations. While most fraternal organizations are members of a Greek council, several organizations are independent of these councils, mainly coeducational organizations, professional fraternities, and honor societies. Traditionally, a student is not allowed to join more than one social fraternity or sorority; however, students are normally allowed to join independent fraternities or sororities (mainly professional or honor organizations) in addition to a social fraternity or sorority. The four Greek councils at the university are as follows:

=== Active councils ===
- The Inter-Fraternity Council, or IFC, is the oldest of the Greek councils. Founded in 1934, the IFC oversees 32 social fraternities and is led by a governing board that is elected by the brothers of the member fraternities. The IFC works with the President's Council, which consists of fraternity chapter presidents, to govern the fraternity community.
- The Inter-Sorority Council, or ISC, is the governing body of the majority of UVA's social sororities. The ISC was founded in 1975, is entirely student-run, and consists of 16 member sororities.
- The National Pan-Hellenic Council, or NPHC, was formed to unite the traditionally black organizations on grounds. The NPHC was originally known as the Black Fraternal Council, which was established in 1973 by the charter of Omega Psi Phi fraternity and re-chartered in 1991. In 2005, the BFC was renamed the National Pan-Hellenic Council. These member organizations include 7 total all-male fraternities and all-female sororities. UVA's NPHC is not to be confused with the National Panhellenic Conference, which is the national governing body of social sororities.
- The Multicultural Greek Council, or MGC, is the youngest of the Greek councils and comprises the multicultural Greek organizations on grounds. Founded in 1999, the MGC is composed of 11 total single-sex and coeducational organizations. Each of these organizations emphasizes a particular race or culture, particularly Asian or Latino culture; however, while these organizations may have a certain cultural emphasis, membership is generally open to students of any race. The council was formerly named the Fraternity Sorority Council and is not to be confused with the National Multicultural Greek Council, the national governing body for various multicultural Greek-lettered organizations.

=== Dormant councils ===
- Greek Jewish Council, or GJC, is a currently dormant Greek Council that has historically been active several times in the history of the University of Virginia. The council was last re-chartered in 2001.

== Controversies ==
=== Rolling Stone article ===
In 2014 the University of Virginia fraternity and sorority system became the focus of significant national scrutiny due to the publication of an article in the December 2014 issue of Rolling Stone magazine, entitled "A Rape on Campus" and authored by Sabrina Erdely. The article alleged that in September 2012, a group of male fraternity members at the university had attacked and raped a female student as part of an initiation rite at a party at the university's chapter of Phi Kappa Psi. The article further asserted that the university's sexual assault policies were severely lacking and that the university administration did not handle sexual assault cases appropriately. The article attracted significant media attention and made national headlines, leading to the suspension of the university's Greek system and further investigation into the article's claims; these investigations quickly revealed numerous inconsistencies and raised serious questions about the article's veracity. On January 12, 2015, Charlottesville Police Department officials told the university that "their investigation has not revealed any substantive basis to confirm that the allegations raised in the Rolling Stone article occurred at Phi Kappa Psi...so there's no reason to keep them suspended". On January 30, 2015, UVA President Teresa Sullivan acknowledged that the Rolling Stone story was discredited. Charlottesville Police officially suspended their four-month investigation on March 23, 2015, stating that they had no evidence of a gang rape taking place, and that "there is no substantive basis to support the account alleged in the Rolling Stone article." On April 5, 2015, Columbia Journalism Review published a report calling the Rolling Stone article "a failure" and criticizing the magazine's actions. That same day, Rolling Stone officially retracted the article and has since issued multiple apologies for the story.

=== Sigma Lambda Upsilon/Señoritas Latinas Unidas Sorority, Inc. v. The Rector and Visitors of the University of Virginia ===
In 2019, the Alpha Rho chapter of the Latina-interest sorority Sigma Lambda Upsilon and UVA were the centers of a notable debate highlighting what constitutes hazing in colleges and universities organizations and the enforcement of anti-hazing policies. The university accused the sorority of violating its anti-hazing policy by requiring its members to complete mandatory study hours of at least 25 hours per week. This was met with the sorority's national organization filing a lawsuit against the university, in which they argued that the mandatory study hours were not hazing and that the university's definition of hazing was too broad. The lawsuit additionally accused UVA of discrimination against the sorority because of its focus on serving the Latina community.

UVA's decision to classify mandatory study hours as hazing was met with criticism from several writers and media outlets. The National Review published an article arguing that the lawsuit against Sigma Lambda Upsilon was a sign of the "hazing hysteria" that has taken hold on university and college campuses. Also reporting on the controversy, The Washington Post and NBC News highlighted the debate over what constitutes hazing and the controversy over UVA's decision to classify mandatory study hours as hazing. A local columnist, Kerry Dougherty, in Virginia, also weighed in on the controversy, arguing that UVA was "making a mockery" of the anti-hazing policy by equating mandatory study hours with hazing.

In response to the lawsuit filed by Sigma Lambda Upsilon's national organization, the university defended its anti-hazing policies and argued that UVA's definition of hazing was consistent with that used by other colleges and universities. The university also emphasized its commitment to promoting diversity and inclusion on grounds, but argued that this commitment did not excuse violations of the university's policies. The case was ultimately settled out of court in 2019, with Sigma Lambda Upsilon agreeing to implement new anti-hazing policies and UVA agreeing to review its policies and procedures related to hazing.

== Social fraternities ==
The University of Virginia has a large number of social fraternities. This list includes active all-male fraternities and coeducational fraternities that identify themselves primarily as social organizations, as opposed to professional, service, or honor organizations. Several of these fraternities were founded much earlier in the university's history, but went inactive and were reestablished later on. In these cases, the establishment date reflects the date that the fraternity's original charter was granted.

Name	Chapter house	Charter date at UVA	Council	Notes	Ref.
Alpha Delta Phi (ΑΔΦ)	Non-residential	1855	IFC	The Virginia chapter of Alpha Delta Phi was originally established in 1855 but was revoked two years later in the prelude to the Civil War. Its second charter was granted in 1987, but the chapter lost its charter again in 2003. The current chapter is the third incarnation, founded in 2010.	
Alpha Epsilon Pi (ΑΕΠ)	The Alpha Epsilon Pi house at the University of Virginia.	November 29, 1924	IFC	Alpha Epsilon Pi, or A E Pi, is a primarily Jewish fraternity that was founded at UVA in 1924 as a Mu chapter. It obtained its original house in 1935 and moved into its current house in 1962. Although it lost its charter in 2010, it was recolonized in 2012. The organization has historically been involved with the Greek Jewish Council, which was last re-chartered in 2001.	
Alpha Phi Alpha (ΑΦΑ)	Non-residential	March 10, 1974	NPHC	The Iota Beta chapter of Alpha Phi Alpha is one of five African-American fraternities at the university. The chapter was established at UVA in 1974.	
Alpha Sigma Phi (ΑΣΦ)	Non-residential	September 20, 2013	IFC	The Zeta Upsilon chapter of Alpha Sigma Phi is the newest fraternity at the university and was established in 2013.	
Alpha Tau Omega (ΑΤΩ)	The Alpha Tau Omega house at the University of Virginia.	November 25, 1868	IFC	The university's Virginia Delta chapter of Alpha Tau Omega, or ATO, was founded in 1868.	
Beta Theta Pi (ΒΘΠ)	The Beta Theta Pi house at the University of Virginia.	April 24, 1855	IFC	The Omicron chapter of Beta Theta Pi, or Beta, is one of the oldest fraternities at the university and was founded in 1855. It owned a house on Rugby Road until its charter was revoked briefly in 1972, at which time the house was purchased by Delta Upsilon, and Beta moved south of grounds. After DU moved in 2010, Beta repurchased the house, in which it currently resides. The adjacent Beta Bridge takes its name from Beta's nearby house.	
Chi Phi (ΧΦ)	The Chi Phi house at the University of Virginia.	May 1859	IFC	Chi Phi at UVA was originally a chapter of the Southern Order of Chi Phi, founded at the University of North Carolina in 1858. The modern Chi Phi fraternity was established in 1874 by the merger of three separate fraternities around the country, all bearing the name Chi Phi. The UVA chapter is considered the Alpha chapter because it is the oldest chapter of the original three organizations.	
Chi Psi (ΧΨ)	the Chi Psi house at the University of Virginia	April 10, 1860	IFC	The Omicron chapter of Chi Psi, also referred to as The Lodge, was founded at the university in 1860. It went dormant during the Civil War and reformed in 1868, but went dormant again in 1872. It was re-founded in 1949 and purchased Charlottesville's former country club on Rugby Road Extended to use as its Lodge for more than 50 years. After becoming inactive in 2008, it was re-founded in 2015.	
Delphic Fraternity (ΓΣΤ)	Delphic Fraternity house at the University of Virginia	March 29, 2009	MGC	The university's Kappa chapter is the only extant undergraduate chapter of Delphic Fraternity, also known as Gamma Sigma Tau. It was the first all-male multicultural fraternity on grounds. It was founded in 2009 by a local fraternity interest group known as the Brotherhood of All Men. It is the second residential MGC organization.	
Delta Kappa Epsilon (ΔΚΕ)	The Delta Kappa Epsilon house at the University of Virginia.	November 26, 1852	IFC	The Eta chapter of Delta Kappa Epsilon, better known as DKE or Deke, was the first fraternity established at the University of Virginia. It obtained its house in 1914 and has remained there since.	
Delta Sigma Phi (ΔΣΦ)	The Delta Sigma Phi house at the University of Virginia.	May 14, 1921	IFC	The Alpha Mu chapter of Delta Sigma Phi, also known as Delta Sig, was established at UVA in 1921.	
Delta Upsilon (ΔΥ)	The Delta Upsilon house at the University of Virginia.	April 8, 1922	IFC	The university's chapter of Delta Upsilon, better known as DU, was founded as the Delta Alpha Social Society. In 1922, it was given a charter as the Virginia chapter of Delta Upsilon. During World War II, the chapter closed temporarily and was reopened in 1949. In 1969, its house on Rugby Road was destroyed by arson. It moved temporarily, and when Beta's charter was revoked in the 1970s, DU purchased Beta's former house next to Beta Bridge. In 2010, DU constructed its current fraternity house, the first to be constructed at the university in over fifty years.	
Iota Phi Theta (ΙΦΘ)		1999	NPHC	The historically African American fraternity Iota Phi Theta formed at UVA as the Delta Upsilon chapter in 1999.	
Kappa Alpha Order (ΚΑ)	The Kappa Alpha house at the University of Virginia.	November 19, 1873	IFC	Kappa Alpha Order, better known as KA, was chartered as the Lambda chapter at UVA in 1873. It originally resided on University Circle and planned to build a replica of Robert E. Lee's Stratford Hall as its official fraternity house; however, plans fell through, and the university's Alumni Hall was built on the site soon after. KA's next house burned down in 1958, and soon afterward, they moved into their current house on Rugby Road.	
Kappa Alpha Psi (ΚΑΨ)	Non-residential	December 7, 1974	NPHC	Kappa Alpha Psi is one of five Black fraternities on grounds, founded in 1974. It was chartered as the Eta Sigma chapter by Linwood Jacobs, an associate professor and associate dean who was responsible for facilitating the establishment of the Pan Hellenic Council at the university, and was quickly filled by university students.	
Lambda Upsilon Lambda (ΛΥΛ)	Non-residential	December 10, 1999	MGC	Lambda Upsilon Lambda, or La Unidad Latina, a Latino fraternity (although open to all ethnicities and races), established its Alpha Epsilon chapter on grounds in 1999 and is a founding member of the Multicultural Greek Council. It has at times served as the third residential MGC organization, although the residence of its members has varied throughout the chapter's history. Additionally, Room 33 West Lawn has historically been lived in by many of the fraternity's fourth-year members.	
Lambda Phi Epsilon (ΛΦΕ)	The Lambda Phi Epsilon house at the University of Virginia.	March 16, 2002	MGC	Lambda Phi Epsilon, or Lambda established its Alpha Tau chapter at the University of Virginia in 2002. Lambda is an Asian-American interest fraternity, although students of all races are welcome to join; it is also the first residential MGC organization.	
Omega Psi Phi (ΩΨΦ)	Non-residential	September 7, 1973	NPHC	The UVA chapter, Lambda Zeta chapter of Omega Psi Phi, was established in 1973.	
Phi Beta Sigma (ΦΒΣ)	Non-residential	April 17, 1974	NPHC	The university's chapter, Zeta Eta of Phi Beta Sigma was established in 1974. The chapter became inactive in 1993 but returned in 2000.	
Phi Delta Theta (ΦΔΘ)	The Phi Delta Theta house at the University of Virginia.	March 15, 1873	IFC	Phi Delta Theta was established at the university in 1873. The chapter name is Virginia Beta.	
Phi Kappa Psi (ΦΚΨ)	The Phi Kappa Psi house at the University of Virginia.	December 8, 1853	IFC	The university's chapter, Virginia Alpha of Phi Kappa Psi, was established in 1853 and is one of the oldest fraternities on grounds. The chapter counts among its alumni Woodrow Wilson, the 28th president of the United States. Its house is modeled after Carr's Hill, the nearby historic house of the university's president. The chapter has also been a source of controversy, most recently due to an article published by Rolling Stone magazine but since retracted and discredited.	
Phi Sigma Kappa (ΦΣΚ)	The Phi Sigma Kappa house at the University of Virginia.	1907	IFC	The university's Psi chapter of Phi Sigma Kappa, better known as Phi Sig, was founded in 1907 from the local fraternity Delta Omega, originally established in 1905. It was inactive between 1916 and 1921, 1936–1956, and 1981–1985.	
Phi Society (Φ)	The Phi Society house at the University of Virginia.	2000	IFC	Phi Society is the only local fraternity recognized by the IFC. When the national organization of Phi Delta Theta banned alcohol consumption in chapter houses in 2000, the University of Virginia chapter broke away from its national organization and established itself as Phi Delta Alpha, a local fraternity, while maintaining alumni support, past composites, and the 1 University Circle house. Without a national charter, the local fraternity was derecognized by the IFC. The newly formed Phi Delta Alpha fraternity then obtained recognition with the university's Multicultural Greek Council and was readmitted to the IFC in 2003. In 2002, the fraternity changed its name to Phi Society, remaining the Virginia Beta chapter.	
Pi Kappa Phi (ΠΚΦ)	The Pi Kappa Phi house at the University of Virginia.	March 6, 1961	IFC	The Beta Upsilon chapter of Pi Kappa Phi, better known as PiKapp, was founded in 1961. It started as a local fraternity, Alpha Mu, that was formed in 1960 because the fraternity was trying to restart its Alpha Mu chapter. In May 1960, Alpha Mu's petition to the IFC was accepted, and a year later, granted full membership of the IFC. It has maintained a residence at 510 Rugby Road since 1962.	
Pi Lambda Phi (ΠΛΦ)	The Pi Lambda Phi house at the University of Virginia.	November 12, 1932	IFC	Pi Lambda Phi, better known as Pi Lam, founded the Omega Alpha chapter at UVA in 1932. During World War II, the chapter membership began to decline, and the chapter was rechartered in 1969.	
Sigma Alpha Epsilon (ΣΑΕ)	The Sigma Alpha Epsilon house at the University of Virginia.	December 19, 1857	IFC	The Virginia Omicron chapter of Sigma Alpha Epsilon was founded in 1857. The chapter did not survive the Civil War but was refounded soon after. It again folded in 1878, but was re-established. The fraternity purchased a house at 1703 Grady Avenue in 1936 and recently moved to its current house in 2006.	
Sigma Alpha Mu (ΣΑΜ)	The Sigma Alpha Mu house at the University of Virginia.	1968	IFC	The Beta Psi chapter of Sigma Alpha Mu, better known as Sammy, was founded in 1968. It went inactive in 2002 and was refounded in 2005. It has moved residences multiple times during its history and is historically a member of the Greek Jewish Council at the university.	
Sigma Chi (ΣΧ)	The Sigma Chi house at the University of Virginia.	December 10, 1860	IFC	The Psi chapter of Sigma Chi was founded at UVA in 1860. The chapter became disorganized during the Civil War, although it was reorganized afterward. During the war, Harry St. John Dixon, one of the chapter's members, created the Constantine chapter to preserve the fraternity in the South after the war and to maintain bonds between the North and South. The Sigma Chi house is named the Constantine Memorial Chapter House in his honor.	
Sigma Nu (ΣΝ)		January 1, 1871	IFC	Established in 1871, the Beta chapter of the Sigma Nu Fraternity has a rich history. Founded on the values of love, honor, and truth, the brothers of Sigma Nu have shown their commitment to UVA and the greater Charlottesville community through community service, extracurricular activities, and academic excellence.	
Sigma Phi Society (ΣΦ)	The Sigma Phi house at the University of Virginia.	February 27, 1954	IFC	The university's chapter of Sigma Phi Society, also known as SERP, was formed from a local fraternity called the Serpentine Club in 1953. It was the first chapter of the fraternity to be founded in the Southern United States. The Alpha of Virginia chapter occupies the house formerly used by UVA's chapter of Delta Tau Delta.	
Sigma Pi (ΣΠ)	The Sigma Pi house at the University of Virginia.	April 4, 1959	IFC	The Beta Pi chapter of Sigma Pi was founded at UVA in 1959. It formed from the Corinthian Club, originally established in 1958	
St. Anthony Hall (ΔΨ)	The St. Anthony Hall house at the University of Virginia.	April 20, 1860	IFC	The Upsilon chapter of St. Anthony Hall or Delta Psi was founded in 1860. It closed in 1861 at the beginning of the Civil War and did not reactivate until 1866.	
St. Elmo Hall (ΔΦ)	The St. Elmo Hall house at the University of Virginia.	January 1908	IFC	St. Elmo Hall or Delta Phi established its Rho chapter at UVA in 1908. During World War II, the entire chapter joined the armed forces, but after the war, several members returned to UVA and revived the chapter. When the houses of St. Elmo and other fraternities began to deteriorate in the 1980s, alumni of St. Elmo Hall prompted the founding of the Historical Renovation Corporation, which works to maintain and improve the chapter houses.	
Theta Delta Chi (ΘΔΧ)	The Theta Delta Chi house at the University of Virginia.	1857	IFC	Theta Delta Chi, also known as Theta Delt and TDX, established Nu Charge at UVA in 1857. The chapter occupies the former home of William Lambeth, namesake of UVA's Lambeth Field and the Lambeth Commons.	
Trigon Engineering Society (ΓΔΕ)	The Trigon house at the University of Virginia.	November 3, 1924	Independent	Trigon Engineering Society, better known as Trigon, is a coed social fraternity for engineering students. It was founded in 1924 as the Delta Society, a political society at UVA, but it quickly decided to pursue fraternal activities as well, adopting the name Trigon, the Greek letters Gamma Delta Epsilon, a handshake, pin, motto, and other fraternal symbols. Although the society was particularly involved in student government during the first half of the twentieth century, it dropped its political mission in the 1960s. The university has granted Room 17, West Lawn, to Trigon as a reserved room, and the society picks one member each year to live in the residence.	
Zeta Psi (ΖΨ)	The Zeta Psi house at the University of Virginia.	July 28, 1868	IFC	Zeta Psi, or Zete, founded its Beta chapter at UVA in 1868. The architectural design of its house draws heavily from Jefferson's design of Monticello.	

== Social sororities ==
In addition to social fraternities, the University of Virginia has a large number of social sororities and women's fraternities. This list includes active all-female sororities that identify themselves primarily as social organizations, as opposed to professional, service, or honor organizations.

Name	House image	Charter date at UVA	Council	Notes	References
Alpha Chi Omega (ΑΧΩ)	The Alpha Chi Omega house at the University of Virginia.	April 19, 1980	ISC	Alpha Chi Omega, better known as AXO, founded the Zeta Lambda chapter at UVA in 1980 from the Rainbow Circle, established in 1979.	
Alpha Delta Pi (ΑΔΠ)	The Alpha Delta Pi house at the University of Virginia.	April 16, 1977	ISC	Alpha Delta Pi, or ADPi, established the Zeta Xi chapter at UVS in 1977.	
Alpha Kappa Alpha (ΑΚΑ)	Non-residential	February 9, 1974	NPHC	Alpha Kappa Alpha is the oldest historically Black sorority. It established Theta Kappa chapter at UVA in 1974.	
alpha Kappa Delta Phi (αΚΔΦ)	Non-residential	November 13, 1999	MGC	alpha Kappa Delta Phi is an Asian-American interest sorority; it established its Sigma chapter at UVA in 1999 thanks to the actions of the Young Asian Women's Alliance at the university. It is one of the founding members of the Fraternity-Sorority Council, which later became the MGC.	
Alpha Phi (ΑΦ)	The Alpha Phi house at the University of Virginia.	December 2, 1978	ISC	The university's Zeta Iota chapter of Alpha Phi was founded in 1978 from the Michaelonian Society, a local group that was established in 1977. The chapter was inactive between 1981 and 2000.	
Chi Omega (ΧΩ)	The Chi Omega house at the University of Virginia.	June 4, 1927	ISC	Chi Omega was the first national sorority founded at the University of Virginia in 1927, after women were allowed to enter graduate programs at the university. Lambda Gamma chapter formed from Theta Sigma Phi, a local sorority that was established in 1926. It was inactive from 1966 to 1977.	
Delta Delta Delta (ΔΔΔ)	The Delta Delta Delta house at the University of Virginia.	September 27, 1975	ISC	Delta Delta Delta, better known as Tri-Delt, established a Beta Sigma chapter at UVA in 1975. It formed from Zeta Omega Omega, a local sorority that formed in 1975.	
Delta Gamma (ΔΓ)	The Delta Gamma house at the University of Virginia.	November 18, 1978	ISC	The university's Epsilon Gamma chapter of Delta Gamma, better known as DG, was founded in 1978 from Gamma Chi, a local sorority established in 1975. Since 1980, the sorority has had a chapter house on Madison Lane.	
Delta Sigma Theta (ΔΣΘ)	Non-residential	November 29, 1973	NPHC	Kappa Rho chapter of Delta Sigma Theta was founded at UVA in 1973. It was the first African-American sorority at the university.	
Delta Zeta (ΔΖ)	The Delta Zeta house at the University of Virginia.	November 12, 1977	ISC	The Lambda Delta chapter of Delta Zeta, better known as DZ, was founded at UVA in 1977.	
Gamma Phi Beta (ΓΦΒ)	The Gamma Phi Beta house at the University of Virginia.	April 9, 1994	ISC	Gamma Phi Beta established its Zeta Beta chapter at UVA in 1994.	
Kappa Alpha Theta (ΚΑΘ)	The Kappa Alpha Theta house at the University of Virginia.	April 3, 1976	ISC	The Delta Chi chapter of Kappa Alpha Theta, better known as Theta, was founded at UVA in 1976.	
Kappa Delta (ΚΔ)	The Kappa Delta house at the University of Virginia.	June 5, 1932	ISC	The Beta Alpha chapter of Kappa Delta, better known as KD, was established at UVA in 1932 from Pi Chi, a local sorority that was established in 1924. It is the second-oldest sorority at the university. The chapter was inactive between 1966 and 1978.	
Kappa Kappa Gamma (ΚΚΓ)	The Kappa Kappa Gamma house at the University of Virginia.	October 23, 1976	ISC	The university's Epsilon Sigma chapter of Kappa Kappa Gamma, better known as Kappa, was established in 1976.	
Omega Phi Beta (ΩΦΒ)	Non-residential	October 25, 1998	MGC	The Iota chapter of Omega Phi Beta was established at UVA in 1998 as the Latina sorority on grounds.	
Pi Beta Phi (ΠΒΦ)	The Pi Beta Phi house at the University of Virginia.	April 30, 1975	ISC	Pi Beta Phi, better known as Pi Phi, established the university's Virginia Epsilon chapter in 1975. Pi Phi was the first national sorority to be established at UVA after the university became coeducational in 1969, although several sororities existed at UVA before that time. Pi Phi purchased its chapter house in 1975.	
Sigma Gamma Rho (ΣΓΡ)		November 5, 1983	NPHC	The Theta Lambda chapter of the historically Black sorority Sigma Gamma Rho was established at UVA in 1983.	
Sigma Kappa (ΣΚ)	The Sigma Kappa house at the University of Virginia.	April 16, 1987	ISC	Sigma Kappa, also known as SK, established its Theta Zeta chapter at UVA in 1987.	
Sigma Lambda Upsilon (ΣΛΥ)	Non-residential	March 23, 2013	MGC	UVA's chapter of Sigma Lambda Upsilon, a Latina sorority, established its Alpha Rho chapter in 2013.	
Sigma Psi Zeta (ΣΨΖ)	Non-residential	December 1, 2001	MGC	Sigma Psi Zeta, an Asian-interest sorority, established its Lambda chapter at UVA in 2001. The chapter evolved from an Asian interest group called the Sisterhood of Young Asians.	
Sigma Sigma Sigma (ΣΣΣ)	The Sigma Sigma Sigma house at the University of Virginia.	April 23, 1981	ISC	The university's Delta Chi chapter of Sigma Sigma Sigma, better known as Tri-Sig, was established in 1981.	
Zeta Phi Beta (ΖΦΒ)	Non-residential	April 2, 1978	NPHC	Tau Theta chapter of Zeta Phi Beta is one of four Black sororities at UVA. It was established in 1978 from Theta Tau, a local sorority established in 1977.	
Zeta Tau Alpha (ΖΤΑ)	The Zeta Tau Alpha house at the University of Virginia.	January 5, 1952	ISC	The Gamma Nu chapter of Zeta Tau Alpha, better known as Zeta, was established at UVA in 1952. It was inactive between 1966 and 1974.	

== Social diaternities ==
The University of Virginia currently hosts one of four social diaternities in the United States, the Alpha chapter of Sigma Omicron Rho LGBTQ & Allied Gender-Inclusive Diaternity. This list includes active coeducational Greek-lettered organizations that identify themselves primarily as social organizations, as opposed to professional, service, or honor organizations. The establishment date reflects the date that the organization was originally founded as a local coeducational fraternity before it attempted to become incorporated.

Name	House image	Charter date at UVA	Council	Notes	References
Sigma Omicron Rho (ΣΟΡ)	Non-residential	August 2009	MGC	The Alpha chapter of Sigma Omicron Rho is currently the only LGBTQ diaternity at UVA and was the first co-educational Greek-lettered organization to be recognized by the university. Founded in 2009 as a local fraternity, Sigma Omicron Rho existed independently of the Greek councils for several years before gaining recognition with the MGC in 2015. It is currently in the process of becoming incorporated and is one of four organizations in the United States to refer to itself as a diaternity (meaning "transcending boundaries"), a term originally coined in 2014 by Lambda Delta Xi Diaternity, Inc. at Kutztown University of Pennsylvania.	

== Service fraternities, professional fraternities, and honor societies ==
The University of Virginia also has chapters of numerous Greek organizations whose primary focus is not social, although some offer social events in addition to service or academic events. While membership in professional fraternities is generally open to any student studying that profession, membership requirements for honor societies are often more demanding and require specific academic or extracurricular achievements.

=== Service fraternities ===
Name	House image	Charter date at UVA	Council	Notes	References
Alpha Phi Omega (ΑΦΩ)	Non-residential	February 9, 1929	Independent	Alpha Phi Omega, better known as APO, is a coed service fraternity. The UVA chapter is Theta.	

=== Professional fraternities ===
Name	House image	Charter date at UVA	Council	Notes	References
Alpha Chi Sigma (ΑΧΣ)	The Alpha Chi Sigma house at the University of Virginia.	May 27, 1922	Independent	Alpha Chi Sigma is a professional chemistry fraternity. The UVA chapter is Alpha Kappa.	
Alpha Kappa Psi (ΑΚΨ)	Non-residential	June 3, 1921	Independent	AKPsi is a coed professional business fraternity whose chapter was founded at UVA in the early twentieth century. The UVA chapter is designated Alpha Gamma.	
Alpha Omega Epsilon (ΑΩΕ)	Non-residential	April 23, 2005	Independent	Alpha Omega Epsilon, or AOE, is a professional engineering sorority that established its Pi chapter at UVA in 2005. It is the only engineering sorority at the university.	
Phi Alpha Delta (ΦΑΔ)	Non-residential	1925	Independent	Phi Alpha Delta, or ΦΑΔ, is a professional international law and pre-law fraternity. This chapter is in district XXIV.	
Theta Tau (ΘΤ)	Non-residential	May 26, 1923	Independent	Theta Tau is a coed professional engineering fraternity that established its Pi chapter at UVA in 1923. In the first half of the twentieth century, it was particularly active in the student government of the Engineering School, along with Trigon, which was its rival organization at the time.	

=== Honor societies ===
Name	House image	Charter date at UVA	Council	Notes	References
Accounting Society at McIntire	Non-residential		Independent	The Accounting Society at McIntire began as the Delta Mu chapter of Beta Alpha Psi, an honor society for finance students. It changed its name in 2015.	
Alpha Alpha Alpha (ΑΑΑ)	Non-residential	November 9, 2023	Independent	Alpha Omega Alpha is an honorary first-generation student society.	
Alpha Epsilon Delta (ΑΕΔ)	Non-residential		Independent	Alpha Epsilon Delta is a premedical honor society. The university's chapter is Virginia Gamma.	
Alpha Omega Alpha (ΑΩΑ)	Non-residential	November 15, 1919	Independent	Alpha Omega Alpha is an honorary medical society. The Alpha Virginia chapter was founded at UVA in 1919.	
Alpha Sigma Lambda (ΑΣΛ)	Non-residential		Independent	Alpha Sigma Lambda is an honor society that recognizes non-traditional students, such as adults with professional careers who are attending college. The UVA chapter is Beta Iota Sigma.	
Arnold Air Society	Non-residential		Independent	The Arnold Air Society is an honor society open to students who participate in the Air Force Reserve Officer Training Corps. The UVA chapter or unit is the Demas T. Craw Squadron.	
Beta Gamma Sigma (ΒΓΣ)	Non-residential	April 12, 1929	Independent	Beta Gamma Sigma is an honorary commerce society. The university's chapter was established in 1929.	
Chi Epsilon (ΧΕ)	Non-residential	1977	Independent	Chi Epsilon is a civil engineering honor society.	
Daniel Hale Williams Pre-Medical Honor Society	Non-residential		Independent	The Daniel Hale Williams Pre-Medical Honor Society works to increase the number of ethnic minority physicians.	
Kappa Kappa Psi (ΚΚΨ)	Non-residential	September 23, 1950	Independent	Kappa Kappa Psi is a coeducational honorary band fraternity. It disbanded after the university's marching band shut down. After the Virginia Pep Band was banned from athletic events and replaced with the Cavalier Marching Band in 2004, the chapter was re-founded as the Beta Chi chapter.	
National Society of Collegiate Scholars	Non-residential	1995	Independent	The National Society of Collegiate Scholars is an academic honor society.	
Nu Rho Psi (ΝΡΨ)	Non-residential		Independent	Nu Rho Psi is a national honor society for neuroscience students.	
Omega Chi Epsilon (ΩΧΕ)	Non-residential	2010	Independent	Omega Chi Epsilon is a chemical engineering honor society. The UVA chapter is Gamma Gamma.	
Order of Omega (Ω)	Non-residential	October 11, 1989	Independent	The Order of Omega is a Greek society that seeks to recognize leaders in the fraternity and sorority community. The UVA chapter is Kappa Zeta.	
Phi Beta Kappa (ΦΒΚ)	Non-residential	June 16, 1908	Independent	Phi Beta Kappa is a coed honor society. The UVA chapter is Beta of Virginia and was established in 1908.	
Phi Eta Sigma (ΦΕΣ)	Non-residential	March 4, 1990	Independent	Phi Eta Sigma is an honor society that recognizes academically successful freshmen.	
Phi Sigma Pi (ΦΣΠ)	Non-residential	March 3, 1991	Independent	Phi Sigma Pi, or PSP, is a coed national honor society. The UVA chapter is Alpha Omicron.	
Pi Tau Sigma (ΠΤΣ)	Non-residential	April 30, 1977	Independent	Pi Tau Sigma established its Virginia Delta Xi chapter at UVA in 1977. It is a mechanical engineering honor society.	
Raven Society	Non-residential	April 27, 1904	Independent	The Raven Society is a local, coed honor society that draws its membership from many of the university's departments and fields of study.	
Sigma Alpha Lambda (ΣΑΛ)	Non-residential		Independent	Sigma Alpha Lambda is a coeducational leadership honor society.	
Sigma Delta Pi (ΣΔΠ)	Non-residential	May 12, 1967	Independent	Sigma Delta Pi is a coeducational Spanish honor society. The UVA chapter is Zeta Zeta.	
Sigma Theta Tau (ΣΘΤ)	Non-residential	1972	Independent	Sigma Theta Tau is a national coed nursing honor society. The UVA chapter is designated Beta Kappa.	
Tau Beta Pi (ΤΒΠ)	Non-residential	May 28, 1921	Independent	Tau Beta Pi is an engineering honor society and established its Virginia Alpha chapter at UVA in 1921.	
Tau Beta Sigma (ΤΒΣ)	Non-residential	April 13, 2008	Independent	Tau Beta Sigma is an honorary band sorority. The UVA chapter is Iota Kappa.	

== Defunct and inactive organizations ==
Several organizations have historically existed at the university but are no longer active. Some of these chapters still have extant national organizations, but the University of Virginia chapter is inactive; others were local fraternities that have since ceased to exist; still others are no longer active because their entire national organization has become extinct. They are listed below.

=== Honor socieities ===
- Delta Sigma Rho (ΔΣΡ)

=== Fraternities ===
- Alpha Chi Rho (ΑΧΡ), 1907–1931
- Alpha Delta Phi (ΑΔΦ), 1855–1857, 1987–2003, 2011–2019
- Alpha Mu Sigma, 1925–1936
- Alpha Phi Epsilon, 1922–1927
- Beta Kappa, 1927–1933
- Chi Delta Sigma, 1993–1996
- Corithian Club, 1958–1959
- Dedils
- Delta Alpha, 1920–1922
- Delta Chi (ΔΧ), 1905–1936
- Delta Kappa (ΔΚ), 1851–1861
- Delta Lambda Phi (ΔΛΦ)
- Delta Tau Delta (ΔΤΔ), 1889–1893, 1889–1946, 1971–2006
- Epsilon Alpha, 1855–1861
- Eta Lodge
- Eta Pi Rho, 1913–1914
- Gamma Delta Pi, 183x ?–18xx ?
- Iota Phi Theta (ΙΦΘ)
- Kappa Alpha Society, 1856–1861
- Kappa Delta Mu (ΚΔΜ)
- Kappa Phi Lambda (ΚΦΛ). 1865–1874
- Kappa Sigma (ΚΣ), 1869–2025
- Kappa Sigma Kappa (ΚΣΚ), 1875–1884, 1935–1939
- Lambda Pi (ΛΠ)
- Lawn Club, 1931–1932
- Mu Pi Lambda (ΜΠΛ), 1897–1903
- Mystic Seven, 1868–1889
- Nu Sigma Nu (ΝΣΝ)
- Omega Theta Pi (ΩΘΠ)
- Omicron Gamma Omega, 1920–192x ?
- Phi Alpha (ΦΑ), 1922–1947
- Phi Alpha Chi (ΦΑΧ), 1883–1895
- Phi Beta Pi (ΦΒΠ)
- Phi Delta Phi (ΦΔΦ)
- Phi Epsilon Epsilon, 1919–1921
- Phi Epsilon Pi (ΦΕΠ), 1915–1970
- Phi Gamma Delta (ΦΓΔ or Fiji), 1857–1861, 1866–1880, 1889–1894, 1897–1999, 2004–2022
- Phi Kappa Sigma (ΦΚΣ), 1854–1861, 1872–2002
- Phi Rho Sigma (ΦΡΣ)
- Phi Society
- Phi Theta Psi (ΦΘΨ), 1888–1895
- Pi Epsilon, 1970–1992
- Pi Kappa Alpha (ΠΚΑ), 1868–1880, 1891–2024
- Pi Mu (ΠΜ)
- Psi Gamma, 1949–1950
- Psi Theta Psi (ΨΘΨ)
- Rotunda Club, 1906–1910
- Serpentine Club, 1946–1954
- Sigma Alpha (ΣΑ), 1871–1877
- Sigma Alpha Kappa, 1925–1928
- Sigma Phi Epsilon (ΣΦΕ), 1907–2009
- Skull & Keys
- Tau Epsilon Phi, 1936–1944, 1988–1993
- Tau Kappa Epsilon (ΤΚΕ), 1950–1995, 2014–2025
- Theta Chi (ΘΧ), 1914–2024
- Theta Nu Epsilon (ΘΝΕ)
- Zeta Beta, 1987–1988
- Zeta Beta Tau (ΖΒΤ), 1915–1973, 1992–2016

=== Sororities ===
- Alpha Gamma Delta (ΑΓΔ), 1990–1992
- Alpha Omicron Pi (ΑΟΠ), 1982–1997
- Alpha Xi Delta (ΑΞΔ), 1987–1992
- Gamma Chi, 1977–1978
- Lambda Theta Alpha (ΛΘΑ), 2001–20xx ?
- Michaelonian Society, 1977–1978
- Phi Mu (ΦΜ)
- Pi Chi, 1924–1932
- Rainbow Circle, 1979–1980
- Sigma Delta {ΣΔ), 2006–20xx ?
- Sigma Delta Tau (ΣΔΤ), 1981–1988, 2011–2018
- Theta Nu Xi (ΘΝΞ), 2002–20xx ?
- Theta Sigma Phi, 1926–1927
- Zeta Omega Omega, 1975–1975

== See also ==
- History of the University of Virginia
- Secret societies at the University of Virginia
