= Rugby Road =

Street in Charlottesville, Virginia, US

Coordinates: 38°2′22.4″N 78°30′7″W

Rugby Road

Rugby Road is a street in Charlottesville, Virginia that serves as the center of the University of Virginia's fraternity and sorority system and its attendant social activity. It is located across the street from central Grounds, beginning at University Avenue across the street from the Rotunda branching off at Preston Avenue and finally curving down to the 250 Bypass, and marks one end of The Corner, a strip of restaurants and stores that cater mainly to students. Rugby Road is lined with a variety of architecturally significant houses from several different decades. Many of these are currently used by fraternities and sororities, although the majority of them were originally intended for single-family use; William Faulkner was one famous resident while he was a writer in residence at the university.

In addition to its social role, Rugby Road is also home to a variety of institutions and well known structures with a wide range of uses and purposes. These include Madison House, the University of Virginia School of Architecture, Mad Bowl, Beta Bridge, the Bayly Art Museum, and the official university structures on Carr's Hill, Fayerweather Hall and the President's House.

== Madison House ==
Madison House serves as the student volunteer center at the University of Virginia. It coordinates volunteers, develops leaders, builds community partnerships and promotes lifelong volunteer service. It is a non-profit student-run organization that helps students at the University of Virginia give back to the university and the greater Charlottesville community through community service. Madison House is unique in that it is student-led and has a multi-tiered leadership and volunteer system. There are 19 programs in which more than 3000 volunteers participate on a weekly basis. University alumni play an important role in the operation of Madison House by donating money to support the programs. Madison House has been recognized nationally with prestigious awards for the services it provides.

Madison House originated at YMCA that was formed in 1856. YMCA was founded on religious values and its members considered volunteer service a big part of their club. Membership declined in the late 1960s and the group considered disbanding. There were members, however, who still believed in the values of volunteer service so they reincorporated as the Masters and Fellows of Madison Hall. Madison House was operating at the same time with a focus on community service. The Masters and Fellows of Madison Hall grew rapidly; in order to sustain their group they sold their property to the university. In 1975, the two groups incorporated and formed Madison House.

The programs run through Madison House include Adopt-a-Grandparent, Animals and Environment, Athletics, Big Sibling, Bridging the Gap, Cavs in the Classroom, Day Care, English as a Second Language, HELP Line, Holiday Sharing, Hoos Against Hunger and Homelessness, Housing Improvement Program, Medical Services, Migrant Aid, Outreach Services, PLAY, Recreational Therapy, Tutoring, and Youth Mentoring. Each program is run by a Head Program Director, a student who bears responsibility for setting goals for the program, budgeting funds, coordinating events, and training the 10-11 Program Directors who work under them in the program. In all, there are about 200 Program Directors who are each in charge of about 10-25 volunteers within a specific program. It is their job to motivate and train volunteers, and they show their willingness to do this with a ten-hour-a-week time commitment. This leadership pyramid is supported at its base by over 3000 student volunteers. These are undergraduate students committed to work for between one and five hours per week on the program to which they belong. Overseeing everything is the staff of Madison House, composed of specialists trained at managing non-profit organizations. They are in charge of the Head Program Directors and help to connect many of the programs to the Charlottesville community. There is also a Board of Directors, with mixed student, University, and community representation, that determines the mission of the House and hires the Executive Director.

Madison House has received several awards for its service. In 1990, Madison House was designated a Point of Light by President George H. W. Bush. This award celebrates the success of the volunteers and spotlights the impact that various individuals, groups, businesses and families have made in their communities. In 2000, Madison House was the only Youth Volunteer group in Virginia to win the Governor's award for volunteer community service.

== Madison Bowl ==
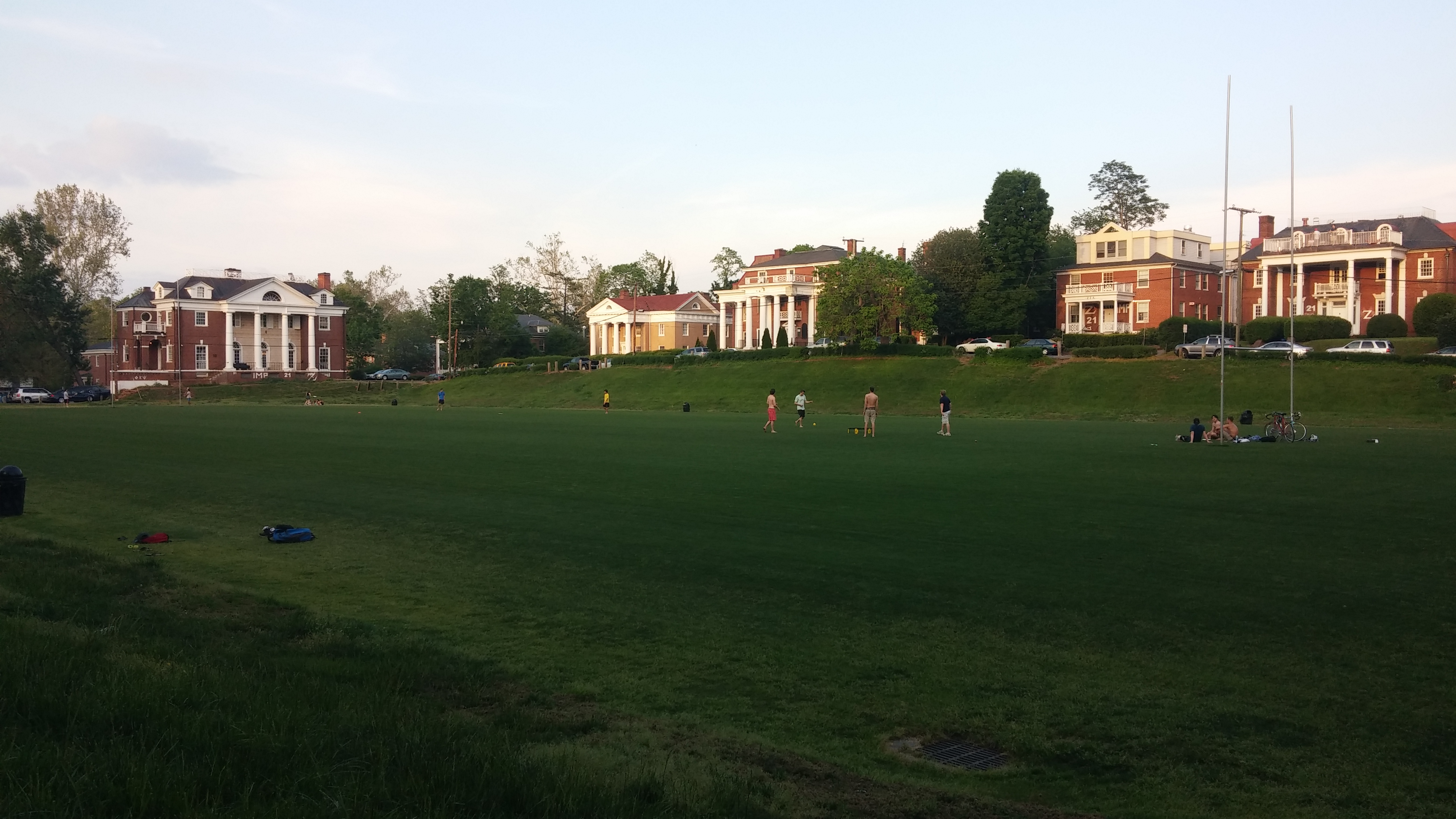
Madison Bowl at the University of Virginia, surrounded by several Greek houses. From left to right: Phi Kappa Psi, Sigma Alpha Epsilon, St. Anthony Hall, Sigma Phi Epsilon (now inactive), Zeta Tau Alpha, and St. Elmo Hall.

Madison Bowl, or "Mad Bowl", as it has come to be known, is located behind Madison Hall between Rugby Road and Madison Lane. Originally owned by YMCA in 1895, Mad Bowl initially hosted five tennis courts; in 1914 a track with banked corners was added. The field has traditionally been used for many different recreational events, including many club and intramural sports, in particular rugby; the Fall Autumns Carnival; Springfest; fraternity and sorority events, fundraisers, and other special events, including the annual Easters party.

As early as 1898, University students celebrated Easter Week, or "Easters", a week-long celebration that included elaborate dances and athletic games which helped the students shake the winter doldrums. It was also an occasion to celebrate Thomas Jefferson's birthday, since the celebration often occurred right around April 13. Traditionally Easters had been celebrated with a ball, but by the 1960s, the fraternities took a more active role in running the weekend, and Easters became a large party held in the fraternity houses along Rugby Road and in Mad Bowl. The event became something like a public street party, attracting attendees from all over the East Coast as well as internationally. Easters may be responsible for the university's reputation as a party school, reportedly earning the university a reputation as a "professional" party location in Playboy in 1964. The last Easters celebration took place in 1982. During that year's celebration, a gas main ruptured on Grady Street and, while no one was seriously hurt, the rising likelihood of a serious public disaster forced the cancellation of the event from that time forward.

In 2006, the university and the city of Charlottesville teamed up to dig up Mad Bowl and replace utility lines, install drainage and add new surfacing. For years, runoff from Fayerweather and Madison Halls collected on the field, giving it the nickname "Mud Bowl." Bad field conditions led to practice cancellations and higher safety risks to students using the field in muddy conditions, and difficulties in planning other field events. Irrigation and drainage systems were added for the field, as well as six inches of fresh soil and a layer of sod. No stadium lights were installed, so the field is exclusively for daytime use.

== Fraternity and Sorority Houses ==
Rugby Road and the neighboring streets house a large number of fraternity residences, including Delta Gamma, Theta Delta Chi, Sigma Phi (SERP), Delta Upsilon, Phi Kappa Psi, Phi Gamma Delta, Delta Sigma Phi, St. Anthony Hall, St. Elmo Hall, Pi Kappa Alpha, Phi Sigma Kappa, Sigma Phi Epsilon (SPE), Pi Lambda Phi, Sigma Chi, Phi Delta Theta, Alpha Epsilon Pi, Pi Kappa Phi, Theta Chi, Kappa Sigma, Kappa Alpha Order, Chi Phi, Delta Kappa Epsilon, Sigma Nu, Phi Society, Sigma Alpha Epsilon, Sigma Alpha Mu, Zeta Beta Tau, Zeta Psi, Alpha Delta Pi, Alpha Tau Omega, and Beta Theta Pi.

In 1983 the University's Board of Visitors decided to address the deteriorating conditions of many fraternity and sorority houses on Rugby Road. It created a limited partnership program, known as the Historic Renovation Corporation. The Historic Renovation Corporation became a partner in the ownership of many of the houses, renovated them, and then sold them back to their original owners, most of whom are University of Virginia alumni. The Historic Renovation Corporation is still operating today, and is currently providing property management services to the alumni owners of eleven Rugby Road houses.

== Carr's Hill ==
Carr's Hill sits at the corner of Rugby Road and University Avenue, facing Mad Bowl to the southeast and the Rotunda to the southwest. The site has long been important to the extended university community. As the enrollment at the university overflowed the original Jeffersonian rooms of the Academical Village, Sidney Carr's boardinghouse on Carr's Hill helped absorb the additional students starting in the mid-1840s. By 1877 Carr's Hill hosted dormitories, at which the university's first experiment in dining clubs took place.

In the years of the Civil War, Carr's Hill served as a drill field and as a site for the Confederate flag, which briefly flew above the Rotunda itself.

The university purchased the Carr's Hill property outright in June 1867 for $10,000, and over time it became the site of two significant University buildings: Fayerweather Hall and the President's residence. Fayerweather Hall, built in 1893, was the university's first dedicated indoor gymnasium, and is currently the site of the University of Virginia's Art History department. The President's House was constructed on Carr's Hill, which had to be terraced for the purpose. Construction began in 1907, two years after the inauguration of the first president of the university, Edwin Alderman, and finished in 1909. The house was designed by McKim, Mead, and White, the team of architects responsible for the buildings on the South Lawn (Rouss, Cocke, and Old Cabell Hall) and the rebuilding of the Rotunda.

== Beta Bridge ==
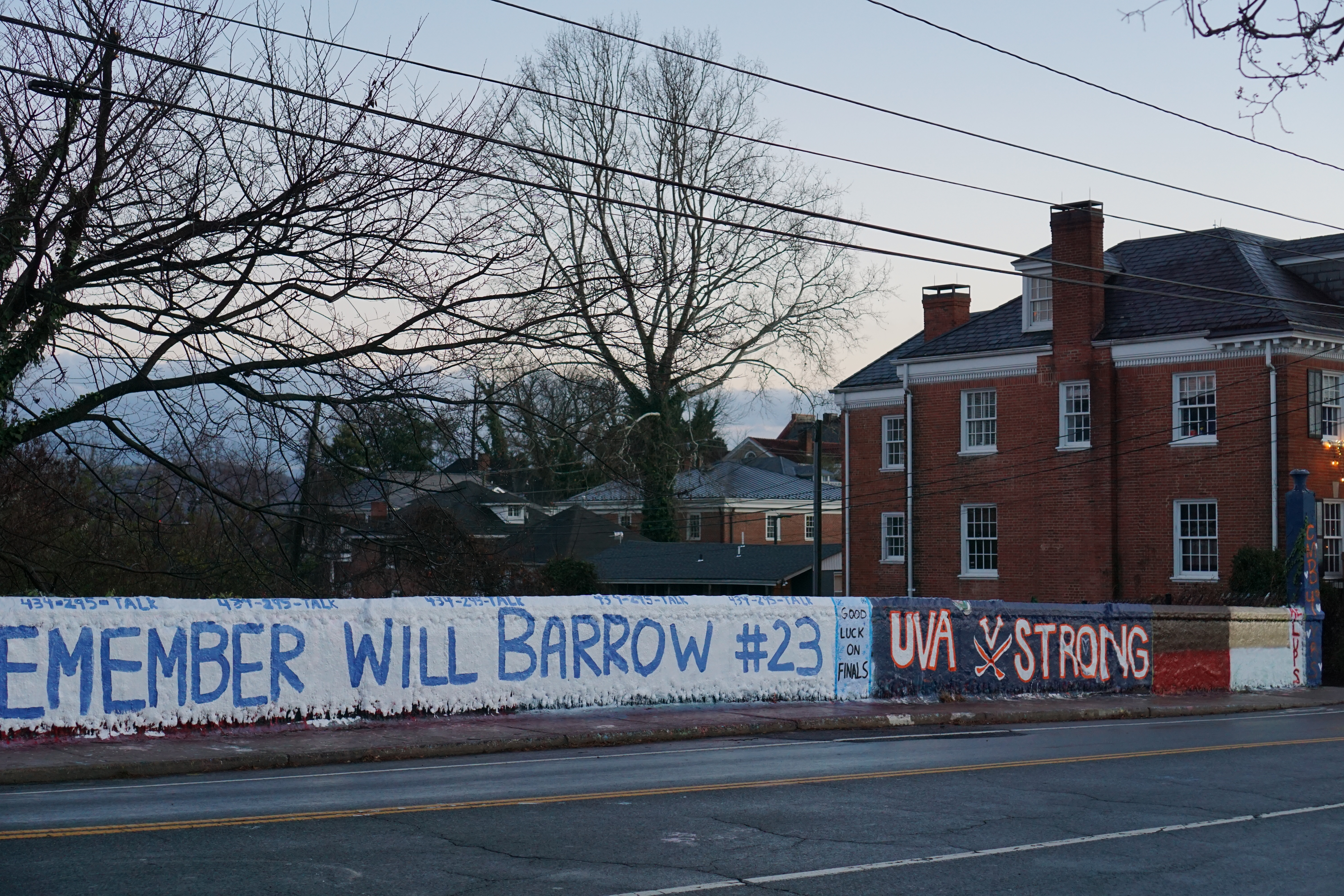
Beta Bridge painted with memorial messages. (2024)

An integral part of Rugby Road is Beta Bridge. In the 1850s, a bridge was erected over the Virginia Central (later to become the Chesapeake and Ohio in the late 1860s) train tracks in the location of what is now Beta Bridge, but the current structure was built in 1923. The bridge was a part of a citywide paving and improvement project to prepare Charlottesville area streets for the automobile. Although it was originally known simply as the Rugby Road Bridge, when the Beta Theta Pi fraternity built their house at the corner of Chancellor and Rugby in 1927, it took its current name. In 1971, that fraternity location was closed, and the Delta Upsilon fraternity moved into its current location at 180 Rugby Road. As the unofficial monitors of the bridge, brothers and pledges of DU would paint over offensive messages or messages which did not contain 'THX DU' (for "Thanks Delta Upsilon"). In 2011, Beta Theta Pi moved back into their original house next to the bridge, and now messages typically contain 'THX Beta'.

The tradition of bridge-painting at the university actually began in 1901 with students painting the railroad bridge crossing over University Avenue at The Corner. When the railroad tried to discourage the practice, students moved their messages to Beta Bridge on Rugby. The first recorded painting occurred in 1926 when a group of students reportedly splashed the bridge with green paint. Sports scores and praises for athletes remained the most common messages on the bridge until St. Patrick's Day of 1967. Holiday supporters painted the bridge a "festive" Irish green, but supporters of the English crown painted over the green with red, also writing "God Save the Queen" in white. The Irish patriots responded by changing the word "Queen" to "Green", and the tradition took off from there. Today, many University organizations paint the bridge to promote their activities.

Some legal and censorship issues have arisen concerning messages and graffiti displayed on Beta Bridge. The bridge is technically property of the city of Charlottesville, and in 1971, five fraternity members were arrested by city police after painting the bridge. Since then, the city has gradually ceded more freedom to students, and messages concerning everything from gay rights to violence against women, career services announcements, memorials for deaths in the community, and fraternity and sorority events have appeared. In August 2005, however, students reported that offensive images and words were painted on the bridge, and University President John T. Casteen III asked the FBI's Civil Rights Unit to investigate the incident for racial implications. FBI Special Agent James Lamb determined that the graffiti was not racially motivated. The bridge has been allowed to remain a de facto "public forum," where the only response to speech is more speech.

Following the 2007 Virginia Tech shootings, UVA students painted Beta Bridge to show their support. This stayed on the bridge for the rest of the school year (normally Beta Bridge is painted at least five times a week.)

On Oct. 2, 2007, UVA Today reported that a sheet of paint approximately 4 feet high, 10 feet long and 3 inches thick separated from a wall of the bridge and fell off. The piece, the second peel-off in the past 13 years, was so heavy that it had to be cut in half before being hauled away by Facilities Management workers. It is suggested that a combination of summer heat, moisture, and weight of layers prompted the peel-off.

After the 2022 UVA shooting, which claimed 3 victims, the half of bridge was painted as a semi-permanent memorial. The message memorializing the victims has remained for at least two years.

== In popular culture ==
Rugby Road figures prominently in university social life. The song "From Rugby Road to Vinegar Hill," a bawdy UVA drinking song, places the Rugby Road scene in the context of student drinking and fun. The song has recently been associated with the Virginia Pep Band, but dates at least to 1951 when it was recorded by the Virginia Glee Club and the University of Virginia Band.
