= The Range (University of Virginia) =

University building in Virginia, US

Coordinates: 38°2′7″N 78°30′18″W

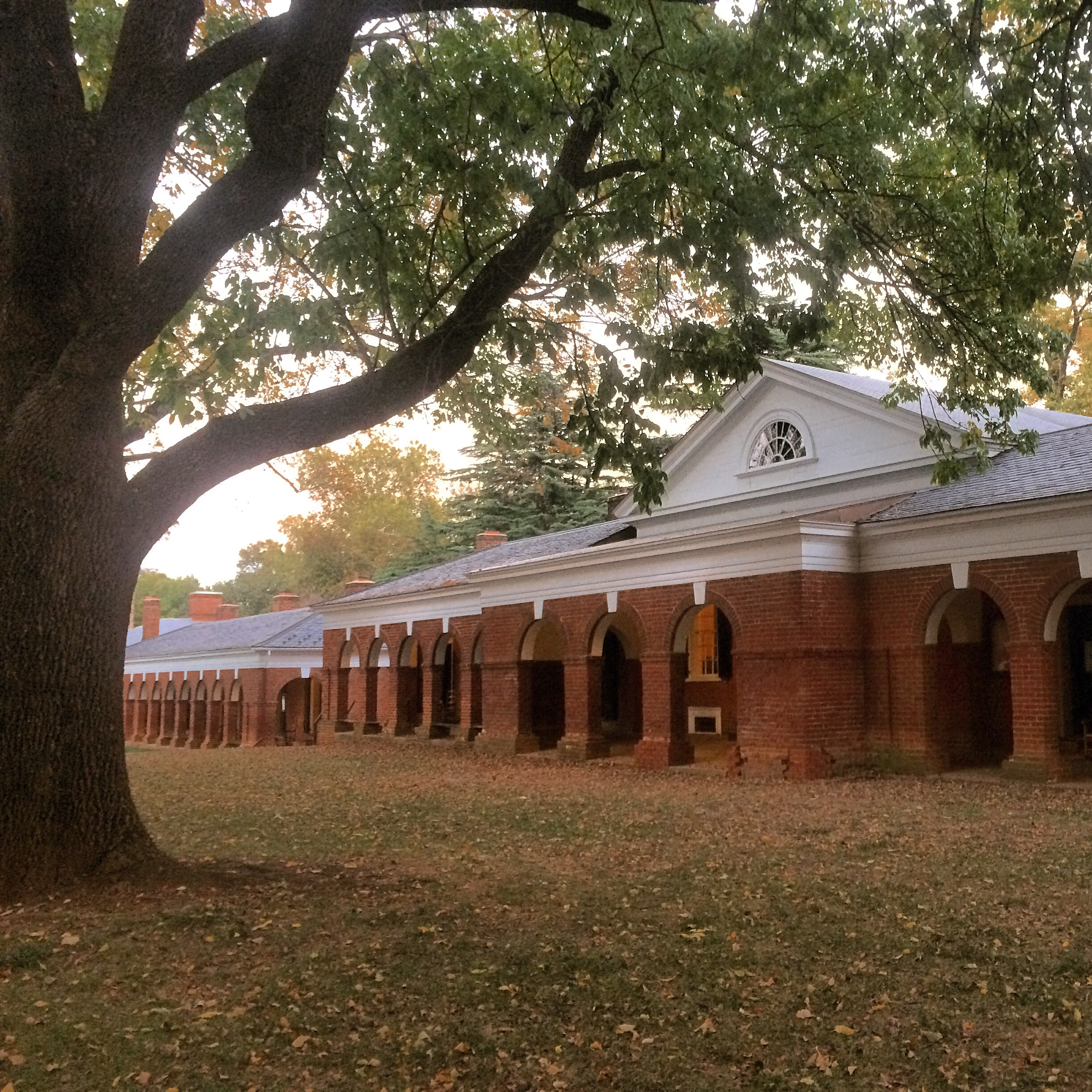
Jefferson Hall, Hotel C, West Range

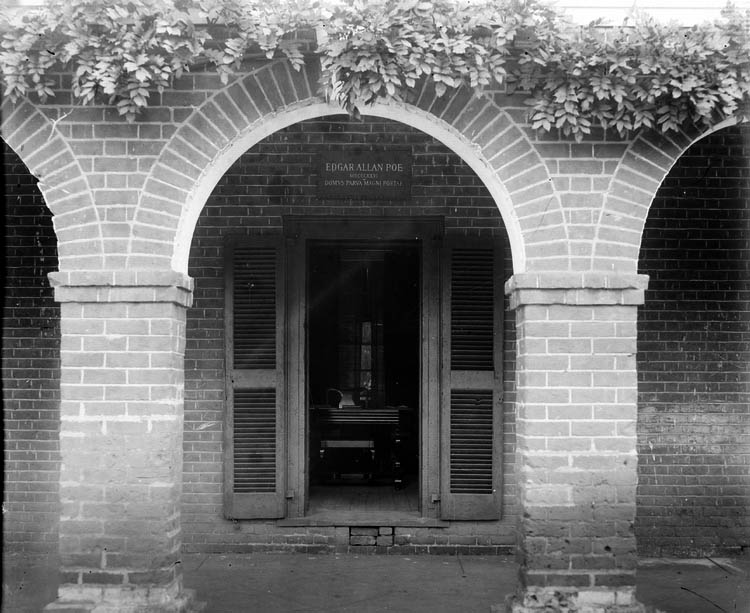
Edgar Allan Poe room on the West Range, 1915

The Range is a community at the University of Virginia for graduate students. The structure was designed by Thomas Jefferson as part of the original design of the Academical Village. There are fifty-four rooms, which run parallel to the Lawn in rows. There are six "Hotels" on the Range, three on each side. Originally used as dining facilities, the Hotels today include a number of administrative office spaces as well as the Jefferson Literary and Debating Society. Previous Range residents who have become well-known include Edgar Allan Poe (13 W. Range), Woodrow Wilson (31 W. Range), and Malcolm Brogdan (40 E. Range). Pi Kappa Alpha maintains 47 W. Range, where it was founded on March 1, 1868.
