= Carr's Hill =

Historic house in Virginia, United States

- U.S. National Register of Historic Places
- Virginia Landmarks Register
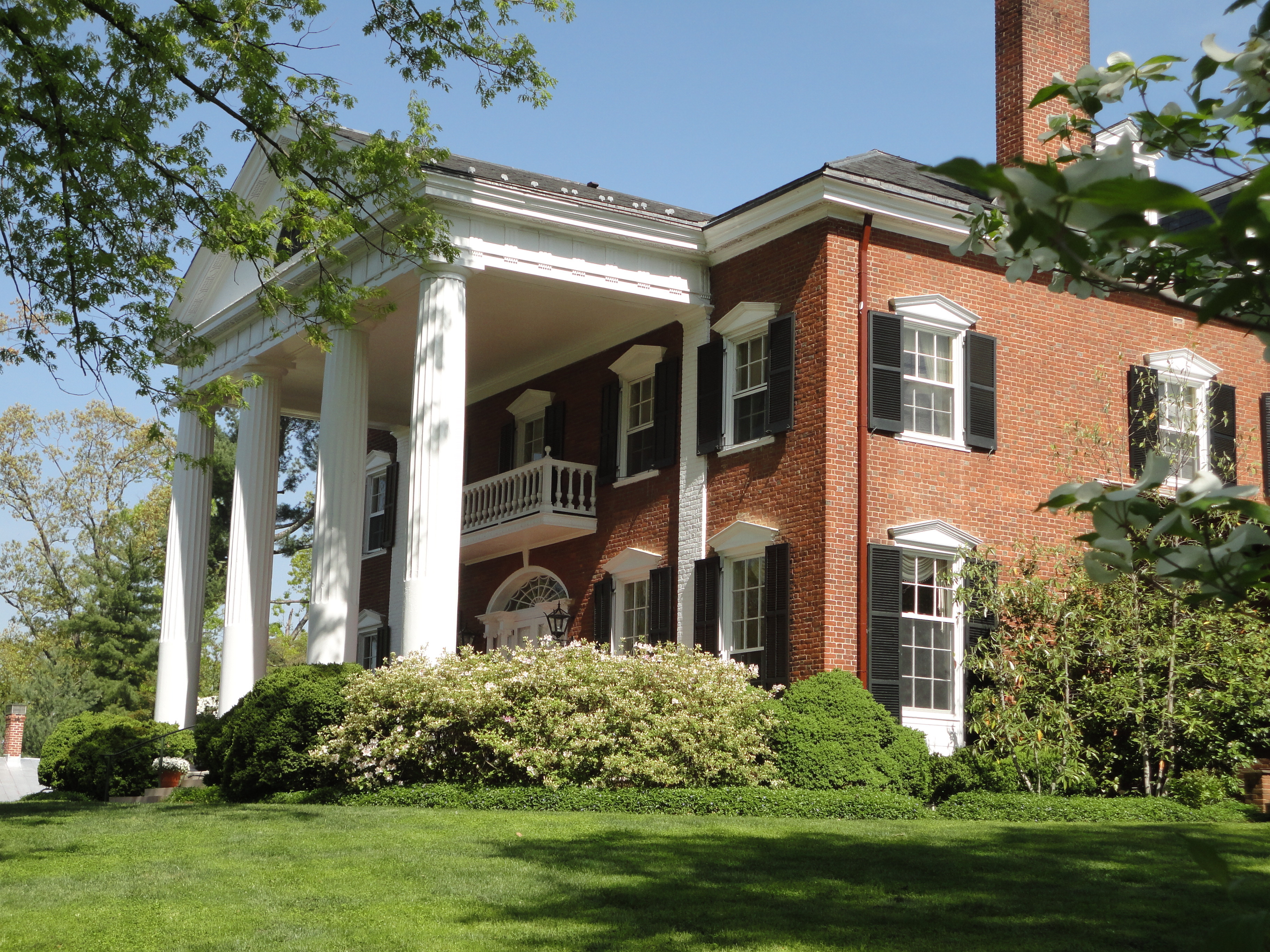
- Carr's Hill, April 2013

- Location within Virginia Location within the United States
- Location: 1910 Carr's Hill Rd., in Charlottesville, Virginia
- Coordinates: 38°02′17″N 78°30′15″W
- Area: 4 acres (1.6 ha)
- Built: c. 1840, 1856, c. 1870, 1906, 1908
- Architect: McKim, Mead & White
- Architectural style: Southern Colonial Revival
- NRHP reference No.: 08000340
- VLR No.: 002-5082

Significant dates
- Added to NRHP: April 23, 2008
- Designated VLR: June 6, 2007

Carr's Hill, also known as the University of Virginia President's House, is a historic home located near Charlottesville, Albemarle County, Virginia. Carr's Hill was built in 1906, and is a two-story, five bay brick dwelling in the Colonial Revival style. It features a prominent double-height pedimented portico in the Doric order, a slate covered hipped roof, and two tall chimneys. It was designed by the prominent architectural firm of McKim, Mead & White. The house overlooks the university chapel and the "Academical Village." Also on the property are the contributing Guest Cottage (c. 1840), Buckingham Palace (1856), the Leake Cottage (c. 1870), carriage house (1908), the landscape (site), and two iron capitals (objects) that were salvaged from the ruins of the Robert Mills Rotunda Annex after the 1895 fire.

It was added to the National Register of Historic Places in 2008.
