= Virginia Pep Band =

Defunct pep band at the University of Virginia (1974-2011)

The Virginia Pep Band was a student-run musical ensemble at the University of Virginia (UVA). In the tradition of scatter or scramble bands, like those at Stanford, Rice and the Ivy League, the Pep Band preferred irreverent humor and individuality to marching in uniform formations. Founded in 1974, this group of students served as UVa's band supporting athletics in an official capacity until 2003. After being banned from official athletic events in 2003, the group continued to perform at sporting events such as swimming, field hockey, and ice hockey. The ensemble has also performed at Charlottesville community events including the Charlottesville 10-miler, the Alzheimer's Walk, and the United Way Day of Caring.

== History ==
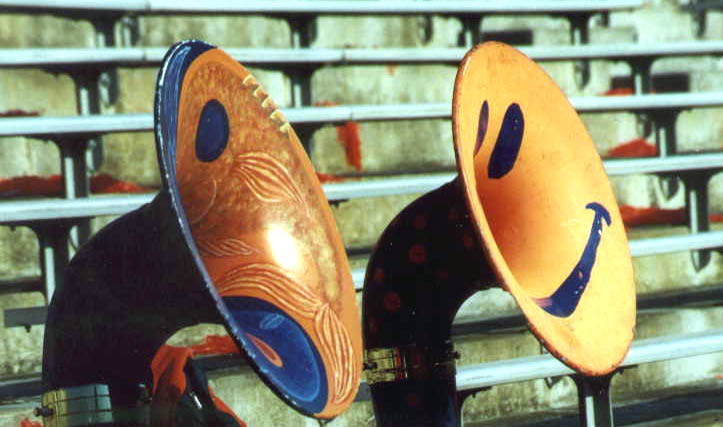
Uniquely painted sousaphones used by the Virginia Pep Band

The earliest appearance of the organization which became the Virginia Pep Band was in 1909, when the East Lawn Chowder Society appeared in the University of Virginia yearbook, Corks and Curls. The East Lawn Chowder Society was a secret society that engaged in general tomfoolery, often involving their rivals, the West Lawn Chowder Society. Later, the East Lawn Society formed a band, which evolved over time into the most recently recognized format. The style and appearance of the organization has changed over time; at some point it even performed a traditional marching band style as the University of Virginia Marching Band (this is why both "award-winning" and "marching" appear in the band's name). In the fall of 1974, under the leadership of Stephen F. Mershon, Hugh Riley, and Franklin Seney, the band adopted the Ivy League scramble band style, beginning the modern era of the band. In the early scramble-band seasons, the band did, in fact, march for the opening and closing numbers in more-or-less straight lines. Marching was later abandoned entirely. The one thing common to all of the current group's predecessors was student governance—complete control by its members rather than University faculty.

=== The "Revolution of '93" ===
In 1993, UVa's then–athletic director, Jim Copeland, announced that the Pep Band would be run by a professional band director. In response, the band went on strike, and its leaders argued they were standing up for student self-governance. Called the "Revolution of '93" by Pep Band members, the clash with the athletic department garnered national attention. Columns and letters in news sources such as The New York Times, the Washington Post, and USA Today addressed the conflict.

During the strike, the athletic department replaced the Pep Band with a faculty-run group called the "UVa Sports Band," a 24-member band which included several hired musicians. The Sports Band proved unpopular with fans, and was introduced at Scott Stadium only once (when it was resoundingly booed). During this game, Pep Band members protested on "The Hill". The athletic department reinstated the Pep Band to athletic events in time for the last home game of the season against Virginia Tech.

=== The Expulsion of 2003 ===
The band's performance at the 2002 Continental Tire Bowl prompted West Virginia Governor Bob Wise to demand an apology from the band and the school for its portrayal of West Virginia residents. The show's script was the result of student writing followed by Athletics Department censorship and approval, and is available online. The Pep Band was permanently banned from ever playing at the bowl again. This prompted emails and phone calls to the UVa Athletics Department, some suggesting the elimination of the Pep Band and the creation of a university marching band.

In the spring of 2003, after the last issue of the Cavalier Daily was published for the year, the Athletics Department banned the Pep Band from performing at official UVa athletic events. Athletics Department officials locked the Pep Band's storage closet without warning, effectively confiscating the band's instruments, both University owned and private. The formation of a new marching band, the Cavalier Marching Band, to debut for the 2004 football season was announced, although the 2003 season was left with no official band. The new band would be run by a professional band director and staff, as opposed to the Pep Band, whose director and managing board were elected from among its student members.

The University of Virginia student council passed a resolution in February 2004 asking for the cooperative "coexistence of two bands," both the faculty and the student-run organizations. Specifically, they asked for the Pep Band's return to athletic events, especially those where the marching band would not perform, but the Athletics Department made no official response to the resolution, leading Pep Band advocates to decry what they saw as an outright dismissal of student governance. The Athletics Department cited several reasons for the change, including fan disinterest in, or fan outrage at, their performances, which were intended to be provocative. Pep Band Director Adam Lorentson said at the time that "cost is the key reason the University does not have a traditional marching band."

The principal players in the Continental Tire Bowl Show, including a "West Virginia Student" (left), "The Bachelor" (center), and a"UVa Student" (right).

Advocates for the Virginia Pep Band, including some in the Cavalier Daily editorial section, claimed that there was strong student support for the organization and that the administration of the University of Virginia and its Athletics Department were exerting more control over something that was historically student-run. They saw the elimination of a "student-run" band as a departure from what they considered to be the Jeffersonian ideals of self-government and freedom of speech that the University of Virginia inherited from its founder. They point out that all the scripts for their performances had been approved by the UVa Athletics Department and, in the case of the Tire Bowl, by the bowl officials themselves. Some columnists downplayed the offensiveness of the band's performances; one Washington Post columnist wrote that the Pep Band was "banned not for the crime of political incorrectness, but for the potential to possibly, just maybe, somehow, somewhere, some day commit it."

Despite the ban, the Pep Band remained active from 2003 to 2011, performing its traditional roles in Charlottesville events and supporting University of Virginia student athletes outside the jurisdiction of the athletic department, such as at club sporting events. For some years on football game day, the Pep Band performed regularly for the UVa Alumni Association at Alumni Hall, as well as performing what they call a "pre-game scramble" for tailgating fans outside Scott Stadium. They also performed for the Washington Capitals of the National Hockey League and the Washington Nationals of Major League Baseball.

== Current status ==
The Virginia Pep Band ceased being an official student group at UVa in 2011. The band was incorporated as Virginia Pep Band inc. in 2011, which consists of a board of alumni charged with maintaining the band's property and legacy.
