= Cavalier Marching Band =

Marching band at the University of Virginia

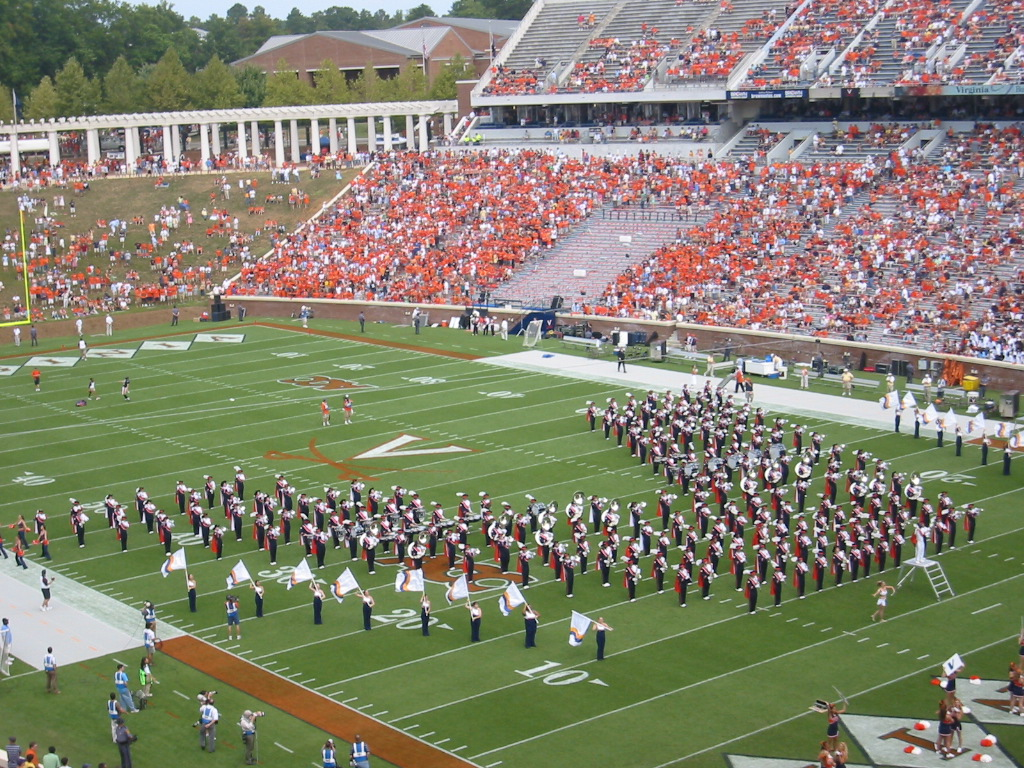
- Cavalier Marching Band forming the V at Scott Stadium in 2007
- School: University of Virginia
- Location: Charlottesville, VA
- Conference: ACC
- Founded: 1958-1964, 2003-
- Director: Elliott Tackitt
- Assistant Directors: Andrew Koch, Michael Idzior, Brandon West
- Members: 235
- Fight song: "The Cavalier Song"
- Website: https://marchingband.as.virginia.edu/

The Cavalier Marching Band (CMB) is the marching band at the University of Virginia. The band's original director, William "Bill" Pease, was the first full-time marching band director in the history of the University of Virginia. The Cavalier Marching Band made its debut on September 11, 2004, after a considerable donation was made by University of Virginia benefactors Carl and Hunter Smith to found the band in 2003. The CMB uses a mixture of both DCI-style glide step and Big Ten-style high step in its performances. Of its 200 plus members, all seven undergraduate schools at the University of Virginia are represented.

The band performs a traditional pregame show prior to the start of football games, which usually features school songs such as "The Cavalier Song" and "Virginia Hail, All Hail". The band also performs during halftime, with a wider variety of music ranging from Broadway show tunes to top-40 hits. The band's musical selections are chosen entirely by student committee.

The Cavalier Marching Band was selected to march in the 2015 Macy's Thanksgiving Day Parade in New York City. More than 44 million viewers watch the parade each year since its first television broadcast in 1939. In addition, the band has performed at a number of bowl games including the 2011 Chick-fil-A Bowl, the 2017 Military Bowl, the 2018 Belk Bowl, and the 2019 Orange Bowl and most recently, the 2025 Gator Bowl. The CMB was also featured in the 2009 film ”Marching Band” a documentary directed by French filmmaker Claude Miller.

The Cavalier Marching Band is assisted by the Beta Chi chapter of Kappa Kappa Psi and the Iota Kappa chapter of Tau Beta Sigma.

== History ==
In the years leading up to the formation of the Cavalier Marching Band, the University of Virginia had become the last remaining program in the Atlantic Coast Conference without a conventional marching band. In the wake of the 2002 Continental Tire Bowl and the banning of the Virginia Pep Band from all future editions of that ACC-tied bowl game, a donation was made by Hunter Smith for the establishment of an official university marching band. The director of the Pep Band at the time, Adam Lorentson, said that cost was the key reason the university did not have a traditional marching band, while Smith's multimillion-dollar donation made the new marching band a reality.

One of Bill Pease's first moves as director was to invite members of the Pep Band to join the new band. In further recruitment efforts, Pease went on to offer spots in the band to musicians at Piedmont Virginia Community College. Pease was given university songbooks from 1907 upon his arrival, and at the 2004 debut featured such University fight songs as "The Orange and the Blue" and "The Virginia Yell Song."

The band performs new halftime shows at every home football game and travels to one or two road games per season (depending on distance and available funding), as well as occasionally performing in exhibition at high school competitions. In its inaugural season, the Cavalier Marching Band had 170 members. Over 90% of members were UVa students; nearly 100% were from the greater Charlottesville community. By its fourth year (2007–2008), the band reached 232 members. More recently, the band's membership has tended to fluctuate around 320 members. Whenever describing the composition of the members of the band, former director Bill Pease typically pointed out that almost none of the members are music majors. He also emphasized that almost a third of the band's members hold positions of leadership, thus illustrating the virtue of student self-governance, an ideal widely emphasized at the University of Virginia.

== Notable Accomplishments ==
The band was featured in the halftime show at the 2005 Music City Bowl in Nashville, Tennessee, and was declared champion of the event's "Battle of the Bands" the night prior, defeating the historic 300-piece University of Minnesota Marching Band. More recently, the CMB has performed at the 2017 Military Bowl in Annapolis, MD, the 2018 Belk Bowl in Charlotte, NC, the 2019 Orange Bowl in Miami Gardens, FL, and the 2025 Gator Bowl (December) in Jacksonville, FL.

The December following the violence at Virginia Polytechnic Institute and State University, the Cavalier Marching Band joined forces with The Marching Virginians of Virginia Tech to host their first annual joint concert, held at John Paul Jones Arena. The aim of hosting this concert was to raise money for scholarship funds at both schools. Half of all proceeds went to the CMB's scholarship fund while half were given to a memorial fund to honor one of the Marching Virginians who was killed during the violence. It was the first time in the history of both schools that their bands performed together.

In their inaugural season, for their October 7 game against Clemson, the band performed with The Temptations Review starring Dennis Edwards. In the fall of 2007, Chad Hugo performed with the band during the halftime show of the November 3 football game against Wake Forest along with his brother Victor Hugo, on saxophone and keyboard, respectively. In addition to the band, over three hundred high school marching band students accompanied them on the field, playing three pieces Hugo had helped produce: Justin Timberlake's Like I Love You, No Doubt's Hella Good, and N*E*R*D's She Wants to Move. In 2012, the Cavalier Marching Band performed with The Temptations in front of a sold-out home crowd against Penn State.

Early in the fourth season the UVa Drumline was chosen by Yamaha Corporation of North America to represent them in an advertisement campaign that was aimed at high school students to promote Yamaha musical products. Interest in the Cavalier Drumline was initiated when a representative of the Yamaha Corporation paid a visit to a spring rehearsal. The representative noticed and commented on the drumline's professional attitude and was compelled to have them added to the national advertisement campaign. The drumline shares the honor with other big college bands.

In 2013, a competitive indoor color guard was formed and was named the "UVA CaptiVAtion Winter Guard". The guard received 3rd place in the 2014 Atlantic Indoor Association circuit championships in the Independent A division, but became inactive after the 2016 season.

The Cavalier Marching Band performed in the 2015 Macy's Thanksgiving Day Parade, performing a swing-style composition of the school's historic and traditional "Good Old Song". It was the band's first appearance in the Parade. During the 2017 season, the band welcomed notable singer-songwriter Lee Greenwood to perform with the CMB in an arrangement of his 1984 hit single, "God Bless the USA", as part of the university's annual Military Appreciation Day.

In 2023, a new competitive indoor color guard was formed, named "TroUVAille Winter Guard". This entirely student-run organization was created to provide existing UVA students interested in color guard the opportunity to improve their skills and compete against other area winter guards during the off-season. TroUVAille competes in the Independent A class in the Atlantic Indoor Association.

== Previous Band Organizations at UVA ==
The earliest appearance of a faculty-led music group performing for sports events was in the mid-1920s, when the University Band provided music for pre-game rallies and at the games. The band suffered from poor funding and outright disasters through the subsequent years, including a loss of its instruments and uniforms to a bus fire in 1941. After a brief resurgence in the late 1950s, including allocation of $12,000 for uniforms, instruments, and facilities by a faculty committee under University President Colgate Darden, the band had dwindled to 25 members by the early 1960s. The band's performances at football ceased in 1964.

Though no band performed at athletic events during the period of 1964 to 1974, the Virginia Pep Band claims that the band at the time remained a club until it became the Pep Band in the mid-1970s. The student-run Pep Band was the official band of UVa athletics for the period between 1974 and the formation of the Cavalier Marching Band in 2003, with the exception of about one month during 1993.

The next faculty-led band at UVa athletic events, subsequent to the demise of the University Band, was the UVa Sports Band, a tiny 24-piece band started by UVa's athletic department in 1993 as a replacement for the Pep Band. It played for only a few home football games before disbanding.
