= 1834 New Jersey gubernatorial election =

- October 31, 1834
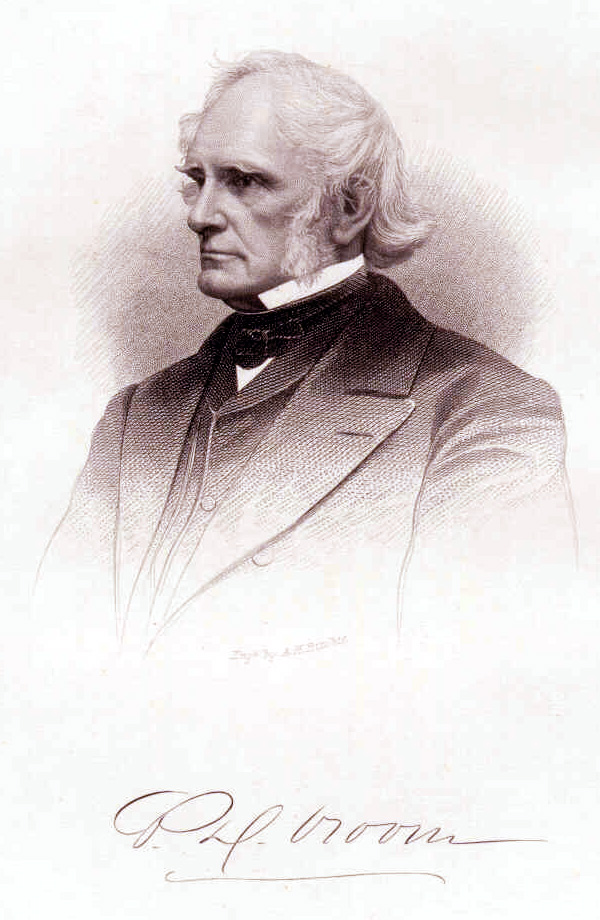
Nominee	Peter Dumont Vroom
Party	Democratic
Popular vote	64
Percentage	100.00%
Governor before election
Peter Dumont Vroom
Democratic
Elected Governor
Peter Dumont Vroom
Democratic

The 1834 New Jersey gubernatorial election was held on October 31, 1834, in order to elect the governor of New Jersey. Incumbent Democratic governor Peter Dumont Vroom was re-elected by the New Jersey General Assembly as he ran unopposed.

== General election ==
On election day, October 31, 1834, incumbent Democratic governor Peter Dumont Vroom was re-elected by the New Jersey General Assembly as he ran unopposed, thereby retaining Democratic control over the office of governor. Vroom was sworn in for his fifth overall term that same day.

=== Results ===
New Jersey gubernatorial election, 1834
Party	Candidate	Votes	%
Democratic	Peter Dumont Vroom (incumbent)	64	100.00%
Total votes		64	100.00%
Democratic hold			
