= 1789 New Jersey gubernatorial election =

- October 31, 1789
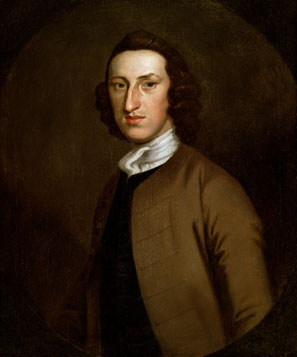
| Nominee | William Livingston |
| Party | Nonpartisan |
| Popular vote | 48 |
| Percentage | 100.00% |
Governor before election
William Livingston
Nonpartisan
Elected Governor
William Livingston
Nonpartisan

The 1789 New Jersey gubernatorial election was held on October 31, 1789, in order to elect the Governor of New Jersey. Incumbent Governor William Livingston was unanimously re-elected by the New Jersey General Assembly as he ran unopposed.

== General election ==
On election day, October 31, 1789, incumbent Governor William Livingston was unanimously re-elected by the New Jersey General Assembly as he ran unopposed. Livingston was sworn in for his fourteenth term that same day.

=== Results ===
New Jersey gubernatorial election, 1789
| Party | Candidate | Votes | % |
|---|---|---|---|
| Nonpartisan | William Livingston (incumbent) | 48 | 100.00% |
| Total votes | | 48 | 100.00% |
| Nonpartisan hold | | | |
