= List of governors of New Jersey =

Governor of New Jersey
- Coat of arms of New Jersey
- Incumbent; Mikie Sherrill since January 20, 2026
- Style: Governor (informal); The Honorable (formal)
- Status: Head of state; Head of government
- Residence: Drumthwacket
- Seat: Trenton, New Jersey
- Term length: Four years, renewable once consecutively
- Constituting instrument: New Jersey Constitution of 1776
- Precursor: Governor of New Jersey (Great Britain)
- Inaugural holder: William Livingston
- Formation: August 31, 1776 (250 years ago)
- Succession: Line of succession
- Deputy: Lieutenant Governor of New Jersey
- Website: www.nj.gov/governor

The governor of New Jersey is the head of government of New Jersey and the commander-in-chief of the state's military forces. The governor has a duty to enforce state laws and the power to either approve or veto bills passed by the New Jersey Legislature, to convene the legislature, and to grant pardons, except in cases of treason or impeachment.

The first New Jersey State Constitution, ratified in 1776, provided that a governor be elected annually by the state legislature, the members of which were selected by the several counties. The 1844 constitution provided for a popular vote to elect the governor for a term of three years, set to start on the third Tuesday in January following an election, and barred governors from succeeding themselves. The 1947 constitution extended terms to four years, and limits governors from being elected to more than two consecutive terms, though they can run again after a third term has passed. Joseph Bloomfield, Peter D. Vroom, Daniel Haines, Joel Parker, Leon Abbett, and Walter E. Edge each served two non-consecutive stints as governor while A. Harry Moore served three non-consecutive stints. Foster McGowan Voorhees, James Fairman Fielder, and Richard Codey each served two non-consecutive stints, one as acting governor and one as official governor.

The 1776 constitution provided that the vice-president of the Legislative Council would act as governor (who was president of the council) should that office be vacant. The 1844 constitution placed the president of the Senate first in the line of succession. A constitutional amendment in 2006 created the office of lieutenant governor, to be elected on the same ticket for the same term as the governor, and if the office of governor is vacant, the lieutenant governor becomes governor. This office was first filled in 2010.

There have been 57 official governors of New Jersey, 2 of whom were female, with several others acting as governor for a time. (Note: Only acting governors who filled a vacant office are included in the list. People who acted as governor for a period when the governor was out of state or unable to serve for a period are noted with their governor. It is possible other people acted as governor for short periods but were not recorded.) In the official numbering, governors are counted only once each, and traditionally, only elected governors were included. However, legislation signed on January 10, 2006, allowed acting governors who had served at least 180 days to be considered full governors. The law was retroactive to January 1, 2001; it therefore changed the titles of Donald DiFrancesco and Richard Codey, affecting Jim McGreevey's numbering. The first and longest-serving governor of New Jersey was William Livingston, who served from August 31, 1776, to July 25, 1790. A. Harry Moore remains the longest-serving popularly elected governor. The current and 57th governor is Mikie Sherrill, a Democrat who assumed office on January 20, 2026.

== Governors ==
New Jersey was one of the original Thirteen Colonies and was admitted as a state on December 18, 1787. Before it declared its independence, New Jersey was a colony of the Kingdom of Great Britain.

Prior to 2010, unlike most other states, New Jersey did not have the office of lieutenant governor. Until 2010, when the office of governor was vacant or the governor was unable to fulfill their duties, the president of the State Senate served as the acting governor. The Senate president continued in the legislative role during their tenure as the state's acting chief executive, thus giving the person both executive and legislative authority. The acting governor served either until a special election was held (which would occur if the governor died, resigned, or was removed from office with more than 16 months before the end of the term), until the governor recovered from their injuries, or, if the governor died, resigned, or was removed from office less than 16 months before end of the term, until the end of the term.

Following the resignation of Christine Todd Whitman in 2001 to become EPA Administrator, Donald DiFrancesco assumed the acting governor's post. Following Whitman's resignation and DiFrancesco's departure, John O. Bennett served as acting governor for three and a half days. During that time, he signed a few bills into law, gave a State of the State Address, and held parties at Drumthwacket, the New Jersey governor's mansion. Similarly, Richard J. Codey served as acting governor during January 2002 as well. Because control of the New Jersey State Senate was split, resulting in two Senate co-presidents, Codey and Bennett, each held the office of acting governor for three days. Richard Codey served as governor of New Jersey from November 2004 until January 2006, following the resignation of Jim McGreevey. Spurred by the chaotic transfers of the governorship, New Jersey voters approved a state constitutional amendment in 2005 to create the office of lieutenant Governor of New Jersey effective with the 2009 state elections.

Governors of the State of New Jersey
No.	Governor	Term in office	Party	Election	Lt. Governor (Note: The office of lieutenant governor was created in 2006 and first filled in 2010.) (Note: Lieutenant governors represented the same party as their governor unless noted.)
1	William Livingston (1723–1790)	August 31, 1776 – July 25, 1790 (5077 days; died in office)	Federalist	1776	Office did not exist
1	William Livingston (1723–1790)	August 31, 1776 – July 25, 1790 (5077 days; died in office)	Federalist	1777	Office did not exist
1	William Livingston (1723–1790)	August 31, 1776 – July 25, 1790 (5077 days; died in office)	Federalist	1778	Office did not exist
1	William Livingston (1723–1790)	August 31, 1776 – July 25, 1790 (5077 days; died in office)	Federalist	1779	Office did not exist
1	William Livingston (1723–1790)	August 31, 1776 – July 25, 1790 (5077 days; died in office)	Federalist	1780	Office did not exist
1	William Livingston (1723–1790)	August 31, 1776 – July 25, 1790 (5077 days; died in office)	Federalist	1781	Office did not exist
1	William Livingston (1723–1790)	August 31, 1776 – July 25, 1790 (5077 days; died in office)	Federalist	1782	Office did not exist
1	William Livingston (1723–1790)	August 31, 1776 – July 25, 1790 (5077 days; died in office)	Federalist	1783	Office did not exist
1	William Livingston (1723–1790)	August 31, 1776 – July 25, 1790 (5077 days; died in office)	Federalist	1784	Office did not exist
1	William Livingston (1723–1790)	August 31, 1776 – July 25, 1790 (5077 days; died in office)	Federalist	1785	Office did not exist
1	William Livingston (1723–1790)	August 31, 1776 – July 25, 1790 (5077 days; died in office)	Federalist	1786	Office did not exist
1	William Livingston (1723–1790)	August 31, 1776 – July 25, 1790 (5077 days; died in office)	Federalist	1787	Office did not exist
1	William Livingston (1723–1790)	August 31, 1776 – July 25, 1790 (5077 days; died in office)	Federalist	1788	Office did not exist
1	William Livingston (1723–1790)	August 31, 1776 – July 25, 1790 (5077 days; died in office)	Federalist	1789	Office did not exist
—	Elisha Lawrence (1746–1799)	July 25, 1790 – October 29, 1790 (97 days; retired)	Federalist	Vice-president of the Legislative; Council acting	Office did not exist
2	William Paterson (1745–1806)	October 29, 1790 – May 27, 1793 (942 days; resigned) (Note: Paterson resigned, having been confirmed as Associate Justice of the Supreme Court of the United States. He submitted his resignation on March 30, but it was not accepted by the legislature until May 27.)	Federalist	1790	Office did not exist
2	William Paterson (1745–1806)	October 29, 1790 – May 27, 1793 (942 days; resigned)	Federalist	1791	Office did not exist
2	William Paterson (1745–1806)	October 29, 1790 – May 27, 1793 (942 days; resigned)	Federalist	1792	Office did not exist
—	Thomas Henderson (1743–1824)	May 27, 1793 (Note: Sobel & Raimo say that Henderson acted as governor because Howell was commanding troops during the Whiskey Rebellion until June 3; however, Howell wasn't elected governor until June 3, and did not accept until June 4.) – June 3, 1793 (8 days; retired)	Federalist	Vice-president of the Legislative; Council acting	Office did not exist
3	Richard Howell (Note: Howell was in Pennsylvania in command of the New Jersey militia during the Whiskey Rebellion in 1794; during his absence, Vice-President of the Legislative Council Thomas Henderson acted as governor from September 20 to December 25.) (1754–1802)	June 3, 1793 – October 31, 1801 (3072 days; retired)	Federalist	1793	Office did not exist
3	Richard Howell (1754–1802)	June 3, 1793 – October 31, 1801 (3072 days; retired)	Federalist	1794	Office did not exist
3	Richard Howell (1754–1802)	June 3, 1793 – October 31, 1801 (3072 days; retired)	Federalist	1795	Office did not exist
3	Richard Howell (1754–1802)	June 3, 1793 – October 31, 1801 (3072 days; retired)	Federalist	1796	Office did not exist
3	Richard Howell (1754–1802)	June 3, 1793 – October 31, 1801 (3072 days; retired)	Federalist	1797	Office did not exist
3	Richard Howell (1754–1802)	June 3, 1793 – October 31, 1801 (3072 days; retired)	Federalist	1798	Office did not exist
3	Richard Howell (1754–1802)	June 3, 1793 – October 31, 1801 (3072 days; retired)	Federalist	1799	Office did not exist
3	Richard Howell (1754–1802)	June 3, 1793 – October 31, 1801 (3072 days; retired)	Federalist	1800	Office did not exist
4	Joseph Bloomfield (1753–1823)	October 31, 1801 – October 28, 1802 (363 days; deadlocked election) (Note: The 1802 election was deadlocked, with the legislature unable to pick a candidate, giving up on November 25, 1802. Vice-president of the Legislative Council Lambert acted as governor until the next election.)	Democratic- Republican	1801	Office did not exist
—	John Lambert (1746–1823)	October 28, 1802 – October 27, 1803 (365 days; retired)	Democratic- Republican	1802	Office did not exist
4	Joseph Bloomfield (1753–1823)	October 27, 1803 – October 29, 1812 (3291 days; retired) (Note: Bloomfield was commissioned a brigadier general in March 1812, to serve in the War of 1812, and Charles Clark, vice-president of the Legislative Council, acted as governor until his successor took office. The specific dates are in question; the state report says Bloomfield was commissioned March 30 and Clark took office June 1, while Lee says Bloomfield was commissioned March 27. It is unknown if Bloomfield formally resigned; Sobel & Raimo say he did, but no sources list Clark as a full governor.)	Democratic- Republican	1803	Office did not exist
4	Joseph Bloomfield (1753–1823)	October 27, 1803 – October 29, 1812 (3291 days; retired)	Democratic- Republican	1804	Office did not exist
4	Joseph Bloomfield (1753–1823)	October 27, 1803 – October 29, 1812 (3291 days; retired)	Democratic- Republican	1805	Office did not exist
4	Joseph Bloomfield (1753–1823)	October 27, 1803 – October 29, 1812 (3291 days; retired)	Democratic- Republican	1806	Office did not exist
4	Joseph Bloomfield (1753–1823)	October 27, 1803 – October 29, 1812 (3291 days; retired)	Democratic- Republican	1807	Office did not exist
4	Joseph Bloomfield (1753–1823)	October 27, 1803 – October 29, 1812 (3291 days; retired)	Democratic- Republican	1808	Office did not exist
4	Joseph Bloomfield (1753–1823)	October 27, 1803 – October 29, 1812 (3291 days; retired)	Democratic- Republican	1809	Office did not exist
4	Joseph Bloomfield (1753–1823)	October 27, 1803 – October 29, 1812 (3291 days; retired)	Democratic- Republican	1810	Office did not exist
4	Joseph Bloomfield (1753–1823)	October 27, 1803 – October 29, 1812 (3291 days; retired)	Democratic- Republican	1811	Office did not exist
5	Aaron Ogden (1756–1839)	October 29, 1812 – October 29, 1813 (366 days; lost election)	Federalist	1812	Office did not exist
6	William Sanford Pennington (1757–1826)	October 29, 1813 – June 19, 1815 (599 days; resigned) (Note: Pennington resigned, having been appointed to the United States District Court for the District of New Jersey.)	Democratic- Republican	1813	Office did not exist
6	William Sanford Pennington (1757–1826)	October 29, 1813 – June 19, 1815 (599 days; resigned)	Democratic- Republican	1814	Office did not exist
—	William Kennedy (1775–1826)	June 19, 1815 – October 26, 1815 (130 days; retired)	Democratic- Republican	Vice-president of the Legislative; Council acting	Office did not exist
7	Mahlon Dickerson (1770–1853)	October 26, 1815 – February 1, 1817 (465 days; resigned) (Note: Dickerson resigned, having been elected to the United States Senate.)	Democratic- Republican	1815	Office did not exist
7	Mahlon Dickerson (1770–1853)	October 26, 1815 – February 1, 1817 (465 days; resigned)	Democratic- Republican	1816	Office did not exist
8	Isaac Halstead Williamson (1767–1844)	February 6, 1817 – October 30, 1829 (4650 days; lost election)	Democratic- Republican (Note: Williamson was known to be a Federalist; though the Federalist Party ceased existing around 1820, no sources say Williamson changed his party affiliation, perhaps choosing to remain loyal to the Federalist ideals. One source describes him as an "ex-Federalist" before he was even elected. However, Glashan and Kallenbach label him as a Democratic-Republican, while Dubin labels him as a Democratic-Republican until 1821, with no party affiliation after that.)	1817 (Note: Williamson was elected by the legislature to succeed Dickerson. No source mentions anyone acting as governor between Dickerson's resignation and Williamson's election; Jesse Upson, vice-president of the Legislative Council, likely acted as governor.)	Office did not exist
8	Isaac Halstead Williamson (1767–1844)	February 6, 1817 – October 30, 1829 (4650 days; lost election)	Democratic- Republican	1818	Office did not exist
8	Isaac Halstead Williamson (1767–1844)	February 6, 1817 – October 30, 1829 (4650 days; lost election)	Democratic- Republican	1819	Office did not exist
8	Isaac Halstead Williamson (1767–1844)	February 6, 1817 – October 30, 1829 (4650 days; lost election)	Democratic- Republican	1820	Office did not exist
8	Isaac Halstead Williamson (1767–1844)	February 6, 1817 – October 30, 1829 (4650 days; lost election)	Democratic- Republican	1821	Office did not exist
8	Isaac Halstead Williamson (1767–1844)	February 6, 1817 – October 30, 1829 (4650 days; lost election)	Democratic- Republican	1822	Office did not exist
8	Isaac Halstead Williamson (1767–1844)	February 6, 1817 – October 30, 1829 (4650 days; lost election)	Democratic- Republican	1823	Office did not exist
8	Isaac Halstead Williamson (1767–1844)	February 6, 1817 – October 30, 1829 (4650 days; lost election)	Democratic- Republican	1824	Office did not exist
8	Isaac Halstead Williamson (1767–1844)	February 6, 1817 – October 30, 1829 (4650 days; lost election)	Democratic- Republican	1825	Office did not exist
8	Isaac Halstead Williamson (1767–1844)	February 6, 1817 – October 30, 1829 (4650 days; lost election)	Democratic- Republican	1826	Office did not exist
8	Isaac Halstead Williamson (1767–1844)	February 6, 1817 – October 30, 1829 (4650 days; lost election)	Democratic- Republican	1827	Office did not exist
8	Isaac Halstead Williamson (1767–1844)	February 6, 1817 – October 30, 1829 (4650 days; lost election)	Democratic- Republican	1828	Office did not exist
—	Garret D. Wall (1783–1850)	October 30, 1829 – November 2, 1829 (4 days; declined) (Note: Wall was elected on October 30, 1829, but declined the post on November 2; some sources say the resignation was effective November 6, when his successor was elected.)	Democratic (Note: No source directly cites Wall's party affiliation when he was elected governor, but it is known he was elected as a Democrat to the United States Senate in 1835.)	1829	Office did not exist
9	Peter D. Vroom (1791–1873)	November 6, 1829 – October 26, 1832 (1086 days; lost election)	Democratic	1829	Office did not exist
9	Peter D. Vroom (1791–1873)	November 6, 1829 – October 26, 1832 (1086 days; lost election)	Democratic	1830	Office did not exist
9	Peter D. Vroom (1791–1873)	November 6, 1829 – October 26, 1832 (1086 days; lost election)	Democratic	1831	Office did not exist
10	Samuel L. Southard (1787–1842)	October 26, 1832 – February 27, 1833 (125 days; resigned) (Note: Southard resigned, having been elected to the United States Senate.)	Whig (Note: Dubin and Glashan label Southard a National Republican, while Kallenbach and Sobel & Raimo label him a Whig.)	1832 (Note: Seeley was vice-president of the Legislative Council at the time of Southard's resignation, but he was elected governor rather than simply acting in the post for the rest of the term.)	Office did not exist
11	Elias P. Seeley (1791–1846)	February 27, 1833 – October 25, 1833 (241 days; retired)	Whig	1832	Office did not exist
9	Peter D. Vroom (1791–1873)	October 25, 1833 – November 3, 1836 (1106 days; resigned) (Note: Contemporary sources say Vroom resigned due to ill health.)	Democratic	1833	Office did not exist
9	Peter D. Vroom (1791–1873)	October 25, 1833 – November 3, 1836 (1106 days; resigned)	Democratic	1834	Office did not exist
9	Peter D. Vroom (1791–1873)	October 25, 1833 – November 3, 1836 (1106 days; resigned)	Democratic	1835	Office did not exist
12	Philemon Dickerson (1788–1862)	November 3, 1836 – October 27, 1837 (359 days; lost election)	Democratic	1836	Office did not exist
13	William Pennington (1796–1862)	October 27, 1837 – October 27, 1843 (2192 days; retired)	Whig	1837	Office did not exist
13	William Pennington (1796–1862)	October 27, 1837 – October 27, 1843 (2192 days; retired)	Whig	1838	Office did not exist
13	William Pennington (1796–1862)	October 27, 1837 – October 27, 1843 (2192 days; retired)	Whig	1839	Office did not exist
13	William Pennington (1796–1862)	October 27, 1837 – October 27, 1843 (2192 days; retired)	Whig	1840	Office did not exist
13	William Pennington (1796–1862)	October 27, 1837 – October 27, 1843 (2192 days; retired)	Whig	1841	Office did not exist
13	William Pennington (1796–1862)	October 27, 1837 – October 27, 1843 (2192 days; retired)	Whig	1842	Office did not exist
14	Daniel Haines (1801–1877)	October 27, 1843 – January 21, 1845 (453 days; retired)	Democratic	1843	Office did not exist
15	Charles C. Stratton (1796–1859)	January 21, 1845 – January 18, 1848 (1093 days; term-limited) (Note: Under the 1844 constitution, governors were ineligible for three years after their term.)	Whig	1844	Office did not exist
14	Daniel Haines (1801–1877)	January 18, 1848 – January 21, 1851 (1100 days; term-limited)	Democratic	1847	Office did not exist
16	George Franklin Fort (1809–1872)	January 21, 1851 – January 17, 1854 (1093 days; term-limited)	Democratic	1850	Office did not exist
17	Rodman M. Price (1816–1894)	January 17, 1854 – January 20, 1857 (1100 days; term-limited)	Democratic	1853	Office did not exist
18	William A. Newell (1817–1901)	January 20, 1857 – January 17, 1860 (1093 days; term-limited)	Republican	1856	Office did not exist
19	Charles Smith Olden (1799–1876)	January 17, 1860 – January 20, 1863 (1100 days; term-limited)	Republican	1859	Office did not exist
20	Joel Parker (1816–1888)	January 20, 1863 – January 16, 1866 (1093 days; term-limited)	Democratic	1862	Office did not exist
21	Marcus Lawrence Ward (1812–1884)	January 16, 1866 – January 19, 1869 (1100 days; term-limited)	Republican	1865	Office did not exist
22	Theodore F. Randolph (1826–1883)	January 19, 1869 – January 16, 1872 (1093 days; term-limited)	Democratic	1868	Office did not exist
20	Joel Parker (1816–1888)	January 16, 1872 – January 19, 1875 (1100 days; term-limited)	Democratic	1871	Office did not exist
23	Joseph D. Bedle (1831–1894)	January 19, 1875 – January 15, 1878 (1093 days; term-limited)	Democratic	1874	Office did not exist
24	George B. McClellan (1826–1885)	January 15, 1878 – January 18, 1881 (1100 days; term-limited)	Democratic	1877	Office did not exist
25	George C. Ludlow (1830–1900)	January 18, 1881 – January 15, 1884 (1093 days; term-limited)	Democratic	1880	Office did not exist
26	Leon Abbett (1836–1894)	January 15, 1884 – January 18, 1887 (1100 days; term-limited)	Democratic	1883	Office did not exist
27	Robert S. Green (1831–1895)	January 18, 1887 – January 21, 1890 (1100 days; term-limited)	Democratic	1886	Office did not exist
26	Leon Abbett (1836–1894)	January 21, 1890 – January 17, 1893 (1093 days; term-limited)	Democratic	1889	Office did not exist
28	George Theodore Werts (1846–1910)	January 17, 1893 – January 21, 1896 (1100 days; term-limited)	Democratic	1892	Office did not exist
29	John W. Griggs (1849–1927)	January 21, 1896 – January 31, 1898 (742 days; resigned) (Note: Griggs resigned, having been confirmed as United States Attorney General.)	Republican	1895	Office did not exist
—	Foster McGowan Voorhees (1856–1927)	February 1, 1898 – October 18, 1898 (260 days; resigned) (Note: Voorhees wanted to run for governor, but as governors were prohibited from succeeding themselves, he had to resign first.)	Republican	President of the Senate acting	Office did not exist
—	David Ogden Watkins (1862–1938)	October 18, 1898 – January 17, 1899 (92 days; retired)	Republican	Speaker of the Assembly acting	Office did not exist
30	Foster McGowan Voorhees (1856–1927)	January 17, 1899 – January 21, 1902 (1100 days; term-limited)	Republican	1898 (Note: Voorhees was out of the country in Europe for several weeks in 1900; President of the Senate William M. Johnson acted as governor from May 21 to June 19.)	Office did not exist
31	Franklin Murphy (1846–1920)	January 21, 1902 – January 17, 1905 (1093 days; term-limited)	Republican	1901 (Note: Murphy was out of the state twice in 1904; President of the Senate Edmund W. Wakelee acted as governor twice, and according to page 284 the 1905 Manual of the Legislature, served from April 25 to June 5, when Murphy was in Europe, and from June 14 to June 27, when Murphy was visiting Chicago and St. Louis. However, page 16 of the same book states that he served from April 25 to June 5, and June 15 to June 27. He actually took the oaths of office on April 26 and June 14.)	Office did not exist
32	Edward C. Stokes (1860–1942)	January 17, 1905 – January 21, 1908 (1100 days; term-limited)	Republican	1904	Office did not exist
33	John Franklin Fort (1852–1920)	January 21, 1908 – January 17, 1911 (1093 days; term-limited)	Republican	1907 (Note: Fort was out of the state for some time in 1909; President of the Senate Joseph S. Frelinghuysen Sr. acted as governor for an unknown period.)	Office did not exist
34	Woodrow Wilson (1856–1924)	January 17, 1911 – March 1, 1913 (775 days; resigned) (Note: Wilson resigned, having been elected President of the United States.)	Democratic	1910 (Note: Wilson was out of the state for multiple periods during his administration. Documented episodes include from May 3 to June 3, 1911, during which time President of the Senate Ernest R. Ackerman acted as governor, though another source states he took the oath on May 4. Ackerman also acted as governor from October 25, 1911, for about a week, and again for about a week in mid-November, 1911. John Dyneley Prince became president of the Senate in 1912, and is known to have acted as governor on at least 11 different occasions.)	Office did not exist
—	James Fairman Fielder (1867–1954)	March 1, 1913 – October 28, 1913 (242 days; resigned) (Note: Fielder wanted to run for governor, but as governors were prohibited from succeeding themselves, he had to resign first.)	Democratic	President of the Senate acting	Office did not exist
—	Leon Rutherford Taylor (1883–1924)	October 28, 1913 – January 20, 1914 (85 days; retired)	Democratic	Speaker of the Assembly acting	Office did not exist
35	James Fairman Fielder (1867–1954)	January 20, 1914 – January 16, 1917 (1093 days; term-limited)	Democratic	1913 (Note: Fielder was out of the state for a time in June 1914; President of the Senate John W. Slocum acted as governor for an unknown period. Walter E. Edge later became president of the Senate, and acted as governor for five weeks in 1915. Later again, George W. F. Gaunt became president of the Senate and acted as governor, though only one day is specifically known, September 19, 1916.) (Note: One source states that President of the Senate George W. F. Gaunt acted as governor in 1917, but it is unknown if he was acting in place of James Fairman Fielder or Walter Evans Edge.)	Office did not exist
36	Walter E. Edge (1873–1956)	January 16, 1917 – May 16, 1919 (854 days; resigned) (Note: Edge resigned, having been elected to the United States Senate.)	Republican	1916 (Note: Edge was out of the state for a time in 1918; President of the Senate Thomas F. McCran is known to have acted as governor, but for an unknown period.)	Office did not exist
—	William Nelson Runyon (1871–1931)	May 16, 1919 – January 13, 1920 (240 days; new senate seated)	Republican	President of the Senate acting	Office did not exist
—	Clarence E. Case (1877–1961)	January 13, 1920 – January 20, 1920 (8 days; retired)	Republican	President of the Senate acting	Office did not exist
37	Edward I. Edwards (1863–1931)	January 20, 1920 – January 15, 1923 (1092 days; term-limited) (Note: Edwards, being term-limited, had already been elected to the United States Senate when his term ended.)	Democratic	1919	Office did not exist
38	George Sebastian Silzer (1870–1940)	January 15, 1923 – January 19, 1926 (1101 days; term-limited)	Democratic	1922	Office did not exist
39	A. Harry Moore (1877–1952)	January 19, 1926 – January 15, 1929 (1093 days; term-limited)	Democratic	1925	Office did not exist
40	Morgan Foster Larson (1882–1961)	January 15, 1929 – January 19, 1932 (1100 days; term-limited)	Republican	1928	Office did not exist
39	A. Harry Moore (1877–1952)	January 19, 1932 – January 3, 1935 (1081 days; resigned) (Note: Moore resigned, having been elected to the United States Senate.)	Democratic	1931	Office did not exist
—	Clifford Ross Powell (1893–1973)	January 3, 1935 – January 8, 1935 (6 days; new senate seated)	Republican	President of the Senate acting	Office did not exist
—	Horace Griggs Prall (1881–1951)	January 8, 1935 – January 15, 1935 (8 days; retired)	Republican	President of the Senate acting	Office did not exist
41	Harold G. Hoffman (1896–1954)	January 15, 1935 – January 18, 1938 (1100 days; term-limited)	Republican	1934	Office did not exist
39	A. Harry Moore (1877–1952)	January 18, 1938 – January 21, 1941 (1100 days; term-limited)	Democratic	1937	Office did not exist
42	Charles Edison (1890–1969)	January 21, 1941 – January 18, 1944 (1093 days; term-limited)	Democratic	1940	Office did not exist
36	Walter E. Edge (1873–1956)	January 18, 1944 – January 21, 1947 (1100 days; term-limited)	Republican	1943	Office did not exist
43	Alfred E. Driscoll (1902–1975)	January 21, 1947 – January 19, 1954 (2556 days; term-limited) (Note: Under the 1947 constitution, governors who have served two successive terms are ineligible for four years.)	Republican	1946	Office did not exist
43	Alfred E. Driscoll (1902–1975)	January 21, 1947 – January 19, 1954 (2556 days; term-limited)	Republican	1949	Office did not exist
44	Robert B. Meyner (1908–1990)	January 19, 1954 – January 16, 1962 (2920 days; term-limited)	Democratic	1953	Office did not exist
44	Robert B. Meyner (1908–1990)	January 19, 1954 – January 16, 1962 (2920 days; term-limited)	Democratic	1957	Office did not exist
45	Richard J. Hughes (1909–1992)	January 16, 1962 – January 20, 1970 (2927 days; term-limited)	Democratic	1961	Office did not exist
45	Richard J. Hughes (1909–1992)	January 16, 1962 – January 20, 1970 (2927 days; term-limited)	Democratic	1965	Office did not exist
46	William T. Cahill (1912–1996)	January 20, 1970 – January 15, 1974 (1457 days; lost nomination) (Note: Cahill lost the Republican nomination to Charles W. Sandman Jr.)	Republican	1969	Office did not exist
47	Brendan Byrne (1924–2018)	January 15, 1974 – January 19, 1982 (2927 days; term-limited)	Democratic	1973	Office did not exist
47	Brendan Byrne (1924–2018)	January 15, 1974 – January 19, 1982 (2927 days; term-limited)	Democratic	1977	Office did not exist
48	Thomas Kean (b. 1935)	January 19, 1982 – January 16, 1990 (2920 days; term-limited)	Republican	1981	Office did not exist
48	Thomas Kean (b. 1935)	January 19, 1982 – January 16, 1990 (2920 days; term-limited)	Republican	1985	Office did not exist
49	James Florio (1937–2022)	January 16, 1990 – January 18, 1994 (1464 days; lost election)	Democratic	1989	Office did not exist
50	Christine Todd Whitman (b. 1946)	January 18, 1994 – January 31, 2001 (2571 days; resigned) (Note: Whitman resigned, having been confirmed as Administrator of the Environmental Protection Agency.)	Republican	1993	Office did not exist
50	Christine Todd Whitman (b. 1946)	January 18, 1994 – January 31, 2001 (2571 days; resigned)	Republican	1997	Office did not exist
51	Donald DiFrancesco (b. 1944)	January 31, 2001 – January 8, 2002 (343 days; new senate seated)	Republican	Succeeded from president of the Senate (Note: A 2006 law considers anyone who has acted as governor longer than 180 days to be considered a full governor, retroactive to January 1, 2001, and as such, DiFrancesco is considered to have fully succeeded to the post.)	Office did not exist
—	John Farmer Jr. (b. 1957)	January 8, 2002 – January 8, 2002 (1 day; new senate president elected)	Republican	Attorney general acting (Note: There were 90 minutes between the end of DiFrancesco's senate term and the beginning of the next one; during this time, Attorney General Farmer acted as governor.)	Office did not exist
—	John O. Bennett (b. 1948)	January 8, 2002 – January 12, 2002 (5 days; new senate president elected)	Republican	President of the Senate acting (Note: The new state senate was evenly split between Republicans and Democrats. The compromise to pick a senate president – and therefore, an acting governor – was to have Republican John Bennett act as governor from 1:30pm January 8 to 12:01am January 12, and Democrat Richard Codey would then act from 12:01am January 12 to noon on January 15, at which point the elected governor took office.)	Office did not exist
—	Richard Codey (1946–2026)	January 12, 2002 – January 15, 2002 (4 days; retired)	Democratic	President of the Senate acting	Office did not exist
52	Jim McGreevey (b. 1957)	January 15, 2002 – November 15, 2004 (1036 days; resigned) (Note: McGreevey resigned due to a sex scandal.)	Democratic	2001	Office did not exist
53	Richard Codey (1946–2026)	November 16, 2004 (Note: Codey was sworn in at midnight on November 16.) – January 17, 2006 (428 days; retired)	Democratic	Succeeded from president of the Senate (Note: A 2006 law considers anyone who has acted as governor longer than 180 days to be considered a full governor, retroactive to January 1, 2001, and as such, Codey is considered to have fully succeeded to the post.)	Office did not exist
54	Jon Corzine (b. 1947)	January 17, 2006 – January 19, 2010 (1464 days; lost election)	Democratic	2005 (Note: Corzine was severely injured in a car accident on April 12, 2007; President of the Senate Richard Codey acted as governor until May 7, 2007. Corzine also left the country in 2010 for a vacation to Switzerland; President of the Senate Stephen Sweeney acted as governor from January 14 to around January 17.)	Office did not exist
55	Chris Christie (b. 1962)	January 19, 2010 – January 16, 2018 (2920 days; term-limited)	Republican	2009	Kim Guadagno
55	Chris Christie (b. 1962)	January 19, 2010 – January 16, 2018 (2920 days; term-limited)	Republican	2013	Kim Guadagno
56	Phil Murphy (b. 1957)	January 16, 2018 – January 20, 2026 (2927 days; term-limited)	Democratic	2017	Sheila Oliver (died August 1, 2023)
56	Phil Murphy (b. 1957)	January 16, 2018 – January 20, 2026 (2927 days; term-limited)	Democratic	2021	Sheila Oliver (died August 1, 2023)
56	Phil Murphy (b. 1957)	January 16, 2018 – January 20, 2026 (2927 days; term-limited)	Democratic	2021	Vacant
56	Phil Murphy (b. 1957)	January 16, 2018 – January 20, 2026 (2927 days; term-limited)	Democratic	2021	Tahesha Way (appointed September 8, 2023)
57	Mikie Sherrill (b. 1972)	January 20, 2026 – Incumbent (Note: Sherrill's term will expire on January 15, 2030.) (in office 307 days)	Democratic	2025	Dale Caldwell (resigned September 25, 2026)
57	Mikie Sherrill (b. 1972)	January 20, 2026 – Incumbent (in office 307 days)	Democratic	2025	Vacant
57	Mikie Sherrill (b. 1972)	January 20, 2026 – Incumbent (in office 307 days)	Democratic	2025	Shirley Emehelu (appointed November 9, 2026)

== See also ==
- Gubernatorial lines of succession in the United States § New Jersey
- Lieutenant Governor of New Jersey
- List of colonial governors of New Jersey
- List of New Jersey state legislatures

== Sources ==
- "Former New Jersey Governors". National Governors Association.
- "New Jersey Constitution". State Democracy Research Initiative. University of Wisconsin Law School.
- Dubin, Michael J. (2003). United States Gubernatorial Elections, 1776–1860: The Official Results by State and County. McFarland. ISBN 0-7864-1439-1 – via Internet Archive.
- Glashan, Roy R. (1979). American Governors and Gubernatorial Elections, 1775-1978. Meckler Books. ISBN 0-7201-1511-6 – via Internet Archive.
- Kallenbach, Joseph E.; Kallenbach, Jessamine S. (1977). American State Governors, 1776-1976. Oceana Publications. ISBN 978-0-379-00665-0 – via Internet Archive.
- Mullaney, Marie Marmo (1994). Biographical Directory of the Governors of the United States, 1988–1994. Greenwood Publishing Group. ISBN 0-313-28312-5 – via Internet Archive.
- Sobel, Robert; Raimo, John (1978). Biographical Directory of the Governors of the United States, 1789-1978. Vol. 3. Meckler Books. ISBN 0-930466-01-2 – via Internet Archive.
- Thorpe, Francis Newton, ed. (1909). The Federal and State Constitutions, Colonial Charters, and Other Organic Laws of the States, Territories, and Colonies Now or Heretofore Forming the United States of America. Vol. 5. United States Government Publishing Office – via Internet Archive.
- Kerney, James (1926). The Political Education of Woodrow Wilson – via Google Books.
- Lee, Francis Bazley (1902). New Jersey as a Colony and a State. New York City: The Publishing Society of New Jersey.
- Lundy, F.L.; et al. (1905). Manual of the Legislature of New Jersey, One Hundred and Twenty-Ninth Session. Trenton, New Jersey: J. L. Murphy Publishing Company – via Google Books.
- Lundy, F.L.; et al. (1921). Manual of the Legislature of New Jersey, One Hundred and Forty-Fifth Session. Trenton, New Jersey: State Gazette Publishing Company – via Google Books.
- Report of the Adjutant-General of the State of New Jersey for the year ending October 31st, 1906. The Union-Gazette Printing House. 1907 – via Google Books.
