= 1791 New Jersey gubernatorial election =

- October 29, 1791
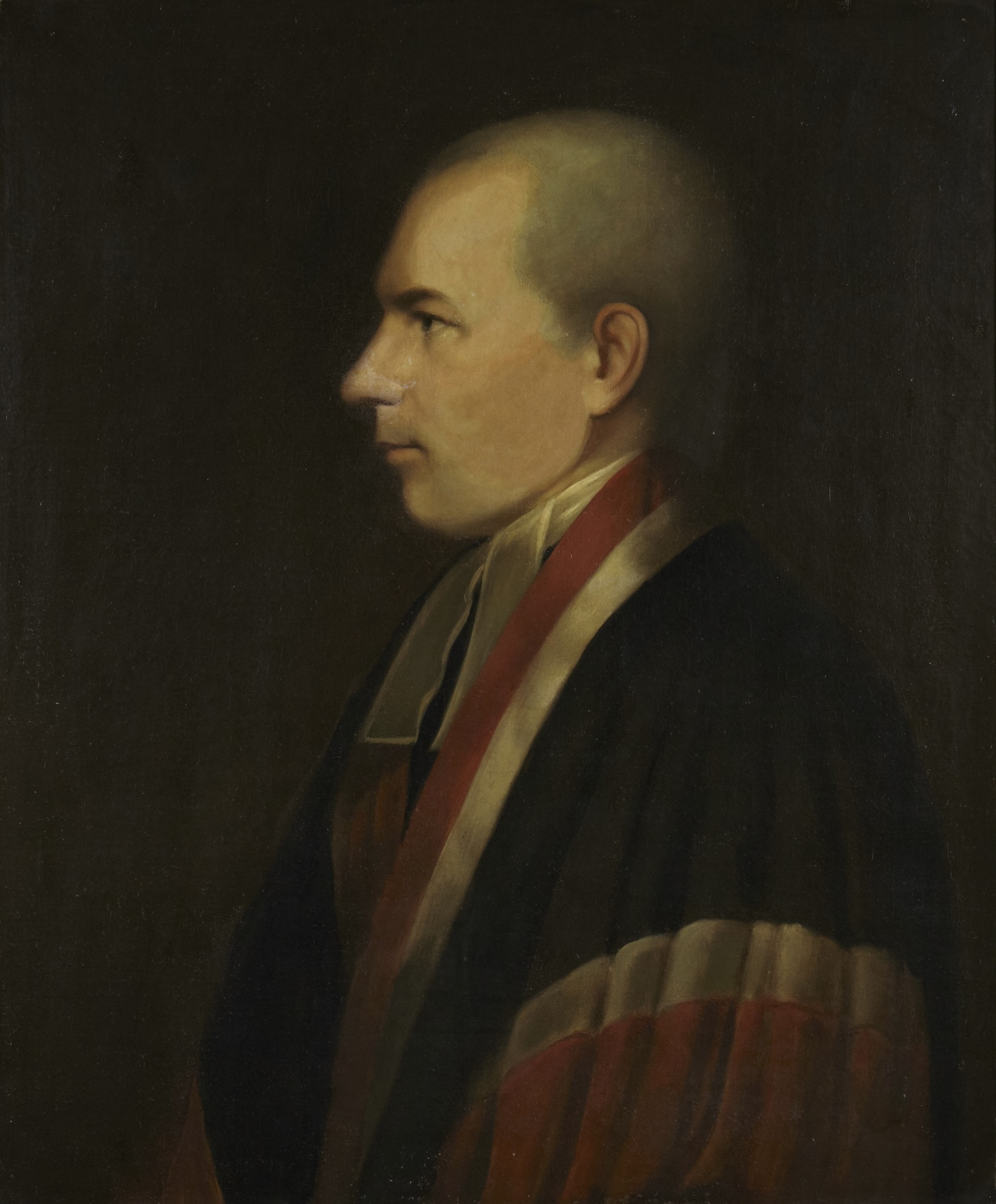
Nominee	William Paterson
Party	Federalist
Popular vote	37
Percentage	100.00%
Governor before election
William Paterson
Federalist
Elected Governor
William Paterson
Federalist

The 1791 New Jersey gubernatorial election was held on October 29, 1791, in order to elect the Governor of New Jersey. Incumbent Federalist Governor William Paterson was unanimously re-elected by the New Jersey General Assembly as he ran unopposed.

== General election ==
On election day, October 29, 1791, incumbent Federalist Governor William Paterson was unanimously re-elected by the New Jersey General Assembly as he ran unopposed, thereby retaining Federalist control over the office of Governor. Paterson was sworn in for his second term that same day.

=== Results ===
New Jersey gubernatorial election, 1791
Party	Candidate	Votes	%
Federalist	William Paterson (incumbent)	37	100.00%
Total votes		37	100.00%
Federalist hold			
