= 1797 New Jersey gubernatorial election =

- October 30, 1797
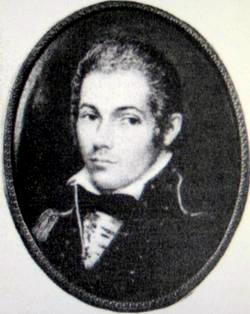
Nominee	Richard Howell
Party	Federalist
Popular vote	48
Percentage	100.00%
Governor before election
Richard Howell
Federalist
Elected Governor
Richard Howell
Federalist

The 1797 New Jersey gubernatorial election was held on October 30, 1797, in order to elect the Governor of New Jersey. Incumbent Federalist Governor Richard Howell was unanimously re-elected by the New Jersey General Assembly as he ran unopposed.

== General election ==
On election day, October 30, 1797, incumbent Federalist Governor Richard Howell was unanimously re-elected by the New Jersey General Assembly as he ran unopposed, thereby retaining Federalist control over the office of Governor. Howell was sworn in for his fifth term that same day.

=== Results ===
New Jersey gubernatorial election, 1797
Party	Candidate	Votes	%
Federalist	Richard Howell (incumbent)	48	100.00%
Total votes		48	100.00%
Federalist hold			
