= 1830 New Jersey gubernatorial election =

- October 29, 1830
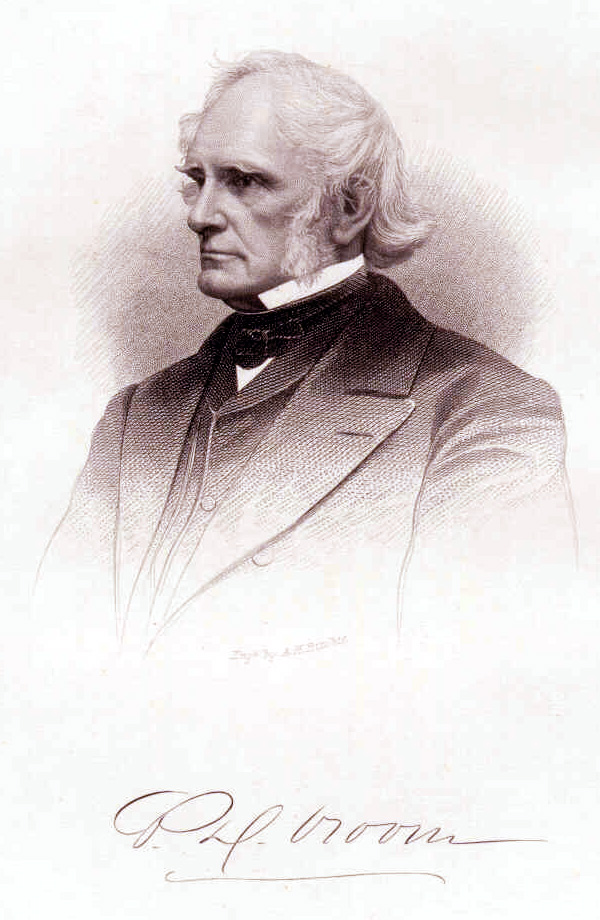
Nominee	Peter Dumont Vroom
Party	Democratic
Popular vote	56
Percentage	100.00%
Governor before election
Peter Dumont Vroom
Democratic
Elected Governor
Peter Dumont Vroom
Democratic

The 1830 New Jersey gubernatorial election was held on October 29, 1830, in order to elect the governor of New Jersey. Incumbent Democratic governor Peter Dumont Vroom was re-elected by the New Jersey General Assembly as he ran unopposed.

== General election ==
On election day, October 29, 1830, incumbent Democratic governor Peter Dumont Vroom was re-elected by the New Jersey General Assembly as he ran unopposed, thereby retaining Democratic control over the office of governor. Vroom was sworn in for his second term that same day.

=== Results ===
New Jersey gubernatorial election, 1830
Party	Candidate	Votes	%
Democratic	Peter Dumont Vroom (incumbent)	56	100.00%
Total votes		56	100.00%
Democratic hold			
