= 1807 New Jersey gubernatorial election =

- November 6, 1807
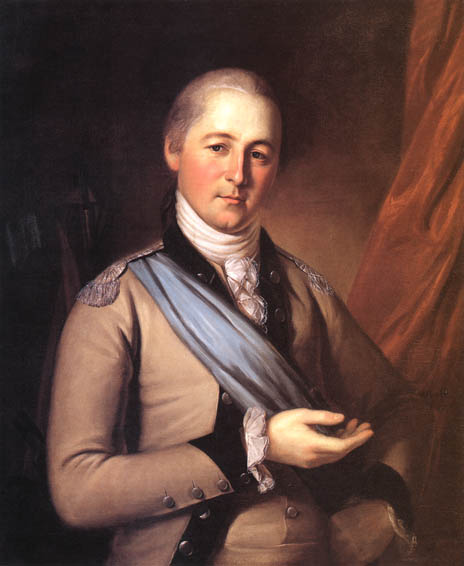
Nominee	Joseph Bloomfield
Party	Democratic-Republican
Popular vote	53
Percentage	100.00%
Governor before election
Joseph Bloomfield
Democratic-Republican
Elected Governor
Joseph Bloomfield
Democratic-Republican

The 1807 New Jersey gubernatorial election occurred on November 6, 1807, to elect the governor of New Jersey. Incumbent Democratic-Republican governor Joseph Bloomfield was re-elected with the majority vote of the New Jersey General Assembly as he contested without any competition.

== General election ==
During the November 6, 1807, election, incumbent Democratic-Republican governor Joseph Bloomfield was re-elected with a majority vote by the New Jersey General Assembly as he ran uncontested, therefore retaining Democratic-Republican authority over the governorship. On the same day, Bloomfield took his pledge of office for his sixth term.

=== Results ===
New Jersey gubernatorial election, 1807
Party	Candidate	Votes	%
Democratic-Republican	Joseph Bloomfield (incumbent)	53	100.00%
Total votes		53	100.00%
Democratic-Republican hold			
