= 1841 New Jersey gubernatorial election =

- October 29, 1841
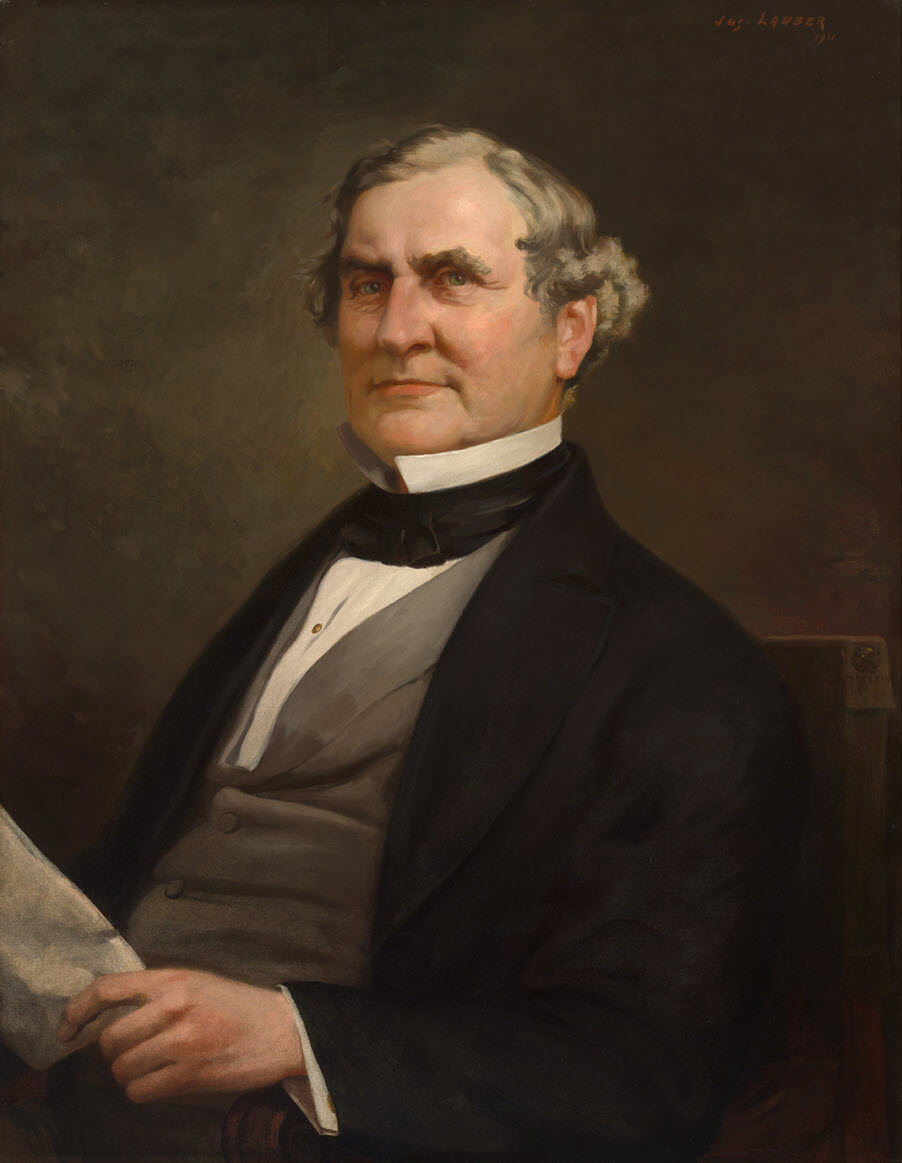

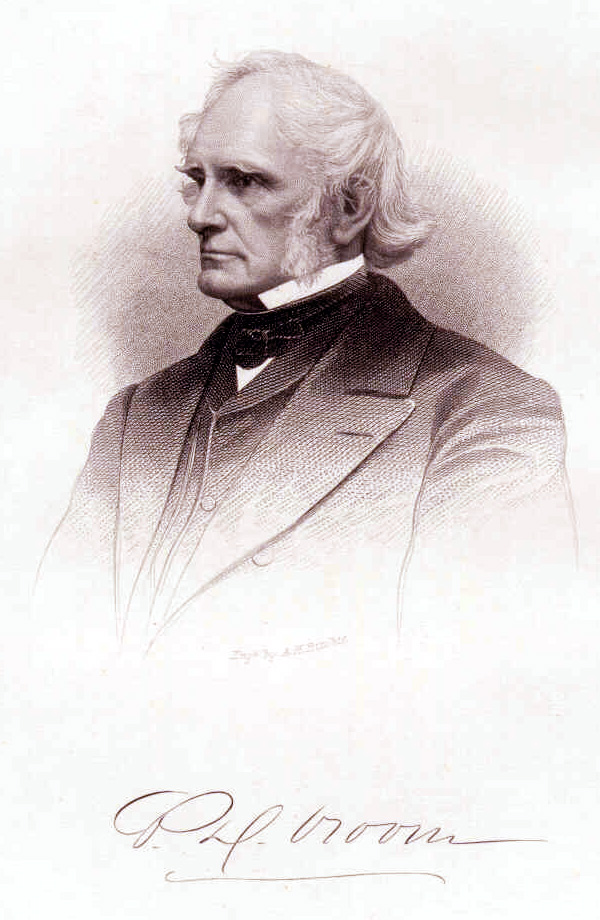
Nominee	William Pennington	Peter D. Vroom
Party	Whig	Democratic
Popular vote	44	30
Percentage	59.5%	40.5%
Governor before election
William Pennington
Whig
Elected Governor
William Pennington
Whig

The 1841 New Jersey gubernatorial election was held on October 29, 1841, in order to elect the governor of New Jersey. Incumbent Whig governor William Pennington was re-elected by the New Jersey General Assembly.

== General election ==
On election day, October 29, 1841, incumbent Whig governor William Pennington was re-elected by the New Jersey General Assembly as he ran unopposed, thereby retaining Whig control over the office of governor. Pennington was sworn in for his fifth term that same day.

=== Results ===
New Jersey gubernatorial election, 1841
Party	Candidate	Votes	%
Whig	William Pennington (incumbent)	44	59.46%
Democratic	Peter D. Vroom	30	40.54%
Total votes		58	100.00%
Whig hold			

== Sources ==
- Sobel, Robert (1978). Biographical directory of the governors of the United States, 1789-1978, Vol. III. Meckler Books. ISBN 9780930466008.
