= 1839 New Jersey gubernatorial election =

- October 25, 1839
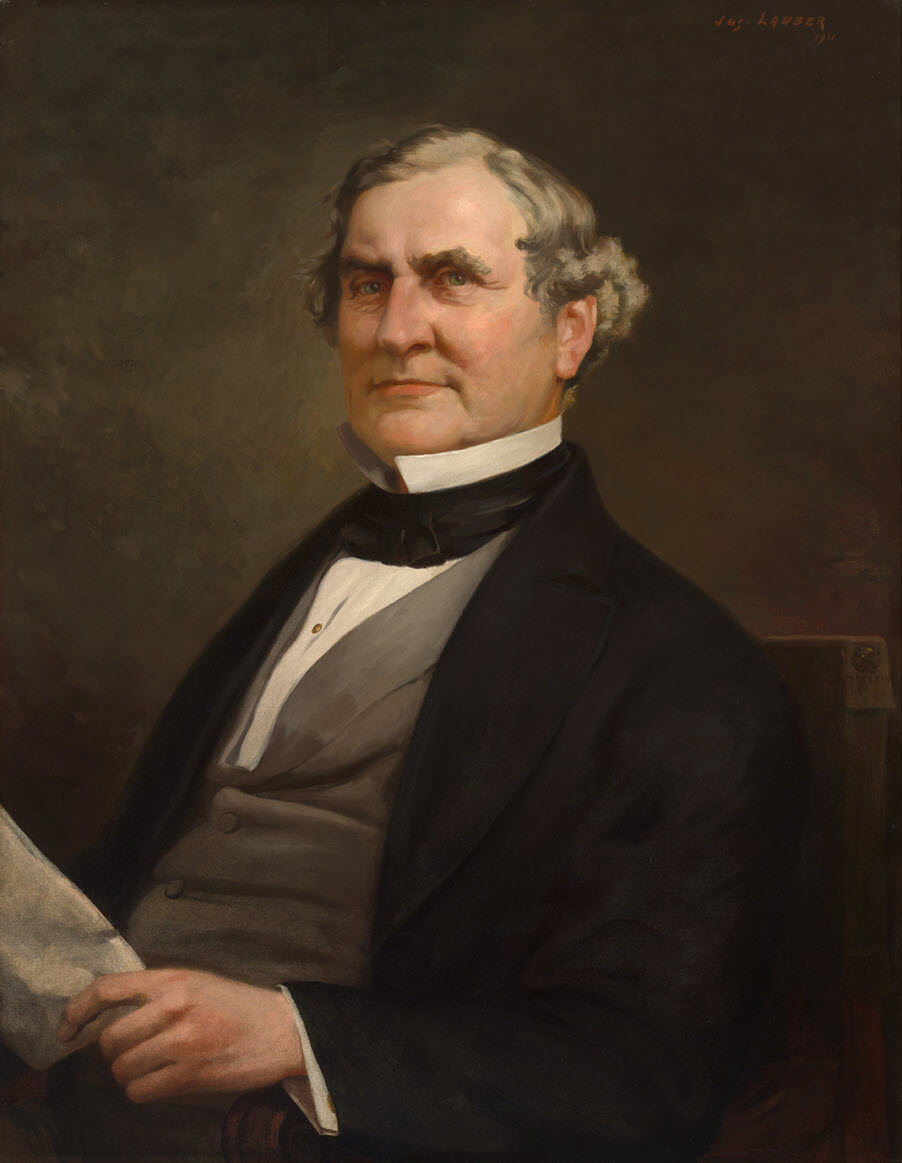
Nominee	William Pennington	Henry A. Ford
Party	Whig	Democratic
Popular vote	42	25
Percentage	62.7%	37.3%
Governor before election
William Pennington
Whig
Elected Governor
William Pennington
Whig

The 1839 New Jersey gubernatorial election was held on October 25, 1839, in order to elect the governor of New Jersey. Incumbent Whig governor William Pennington was re-elected by the New Jersey General Assembly.

== General election ==
On election day, October 25, 1839, incumbent Whig governor William Pennington was re-elected by the New Jersey General Assembly thereby retaining Whig control over the office of governor. Pennington was sworn in for his third term that same day.

=== Results ===
New Jersey gubernatorial election, 1839
Party	Candidate	Votes	%
Whig	William Pennington (incumbent)	42	62.69%
Democratic	Henry A. Ford	25	37.31%
Total votes		67	100.00%
Whig hold			

== Sources ==
- Sobel, Robert (1978). Biographical directory of the governors of the United States, 1789-1978, Vol. III. Meckler Books. ISBN 9780930466008.
