= 1788 New Jersey gubernatorial election =

- October 31, 1788
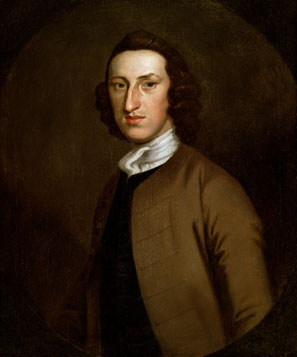
Nominee	William Livingston
Party	Nonpartisan
Popular vote	48
Percentage	100.00%
Governor before election
William Livingston
Nonpartisan
Elected Governor
William Livingston
Nonpartisan

The 1788 New Jersey gubernatorial election was held on October 31, 1788, in order to elect the Governor of New Jersey. Incumbent Governor William Livingston was unanimously re-elected by the New Jersey General Assembly as he ran unopposed.

== General election ==
On election day, October 31, 1788, incumbent Governor William Livingston was unanimously re-elected by the New Jersey General Assembly as he ran unopposed. Livingston was sworn in for his thirteenth term that same day.

=== Results ===
New Jersey gubernatorial election, 1788
Party	Candidate	Votes	%
Nonpartisan	William Livingston (incumbent)	48	100.00%
Total votes		48	100.00%
Nonpartisan hold			
