= 1785 New Jersey gubernatorial election =

- October 28, 1785
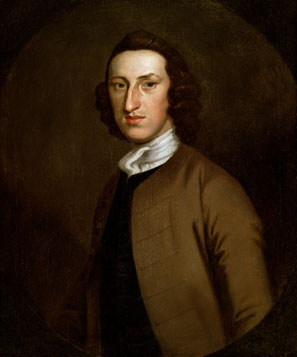

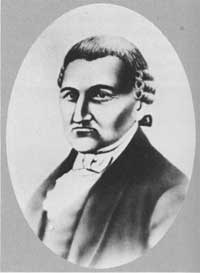
Nominee	William Livingston	David Brearley
Party	Nonpartisan	Nonpartisan
Popular vote	38	2
Percentage	95.00%	5.00%
Governor before election
William Livingston
Nonpartisan
Elected Governor
William Livingston
Nonpartisan

The 1785 New Jersey gubernatorial election was held on October 28, 1785, in order to elect the Governor of New Jersey. Incumbent Governor William Livingston was re-elected by the New Jersey General Assembly against his opponent candidate David Brearley.

== General election ==
On election day, October 28, 1785, incumbent Governor William Livingston was re-elected by the New Jersey General Assembly by a margin of 36 votes against his opponent candidate David Brearley. Livingston was sworn in for his tenth term on October 30, 1785.

=== Results ===
New Jersey gubernatorial election, 1785
Party	Candidate	Votes	%
Nonpartisan	William Livingston (incumbent)	38	95.00%
Nonpartisan	David Brearley	2	5.00%
Total votes		40	100.00%
Nonpartisan hold			
