= 1831 New Jersey gubernatorial election =

- October 28, 1831
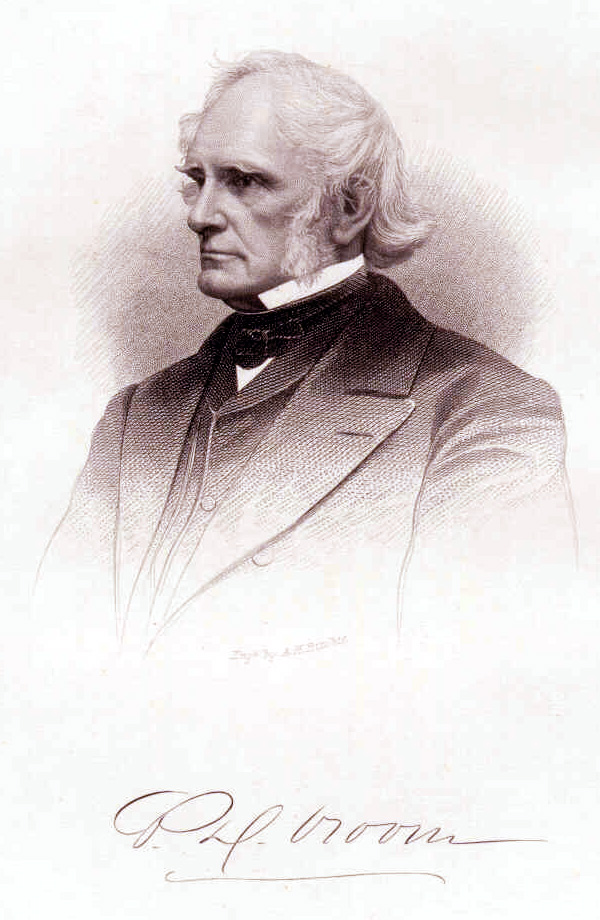
Nominee	Peter Dumont Vroom
Party	Democratic
Popular vote	56
Percentage	100.00%
Governor before election
Peter Dumont Vroom
Democratic
Elected Governor
Peter Dumont Vroom
Democratic

The 1831 New Jersey gubernatorial election was held on October 28, 1831, in order to elect the governor of New Jersey. Incumbent Democratic governor Peter Dumont Vroom was re-elected by the New Jersey General Assembly as he ran unopposed.

== General election ==
On election day, October 28, 1831, incumbent Democratic governor Peter Dumont Vroom was re-elected by the New Jersey General Assembly as he ran unopposed, thereby retaining Democratic control over the office of governor. Vroom was sworn in for his third term that same day.

=== Results ===
New Jersey gubernatorial election, 1831
Party	Candidate	Votes	%
Democratic	Peter Dumont Vroom (incumbent)	56	100.00%
Total votes		56	100.00%
Democratic hold			
