= 1818 New Jersey gubernatorial election =

- October 29, 1818
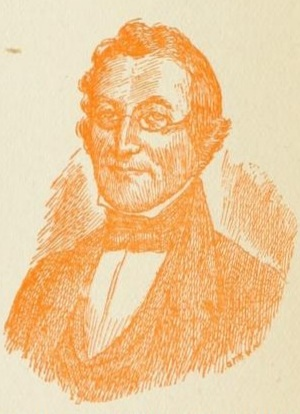
| Nominee | Isaac Halstead Williamson |
| Party | Democratic-Republican |
| Popular vote | 52 |
| Percentage | 100.00% |
Governor before election
Isaac Halstead Williamson
Democratic-Republican
Elected Governor
Isaac Halstead Williamson
Democratic-Republican

The 1818 New Jersey gubernatorial election was held on October 29, 1818, in order to elect the governor of New Jersey. Incumbent Democratic-Republican governor Isaac Halstead Williamson was re-elected by the New Jersey General Assembly as he ran unopposed.

== General election ==
On election day, October 29, 1818, incumbent Democratic-Republican governor Isaac Halstead Williamson was re-elected by the New Jersey General Assembly as he ran unopposed, thereby retaining Democratic-Republican control over the office of governor. Williamson was sworn in for his second term that same day.

=== Results ===
New Jersey gubernatorial election, 1818
| Party | Candidate | Votes | % |
|---|---|---|---|
| Democratic-Republican | Isaac Halstead Williamson (incumbent) | 52 | 100.00% |
| Total votes | | 52 | 100.00% |
| Democratic-Republican hold | | | |
