= 1795 New Jersey gubernatorial election =

- November 3, 1795
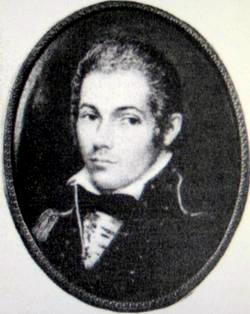
| Nominee | Richard Howell |
| Party | Federalist |
| Popular vote | 48 |
| Percentage | 100.00% |
Governor before election
Richard Howell
Federalist
Elected Governor
Richard Howell
Federalist

The 1795 New Jersey gubernatorial election was held on November 3, 1795, in order to elect the Governor of New Jersey. Incumbent Federalist Governor Richard Howell was unanimously re-elected by the New Jersey General Assembly as he ran unopposed.

== General election ==
On election day, November 3, 1795, incumbent Federalist Governor Richard Howell was unanimously re-elected by the New Jersey General Assembly as he ran unopposed, thereby retaining Federalist control over the office of Governor. Howell was sworn in for his third term that same day.

=== Results ===
New Jersey gubernatorial election, 1795
| Party | Candidate | Votes | % |
|---|---|---|---|
| Federalist | Richard Howell (incumbent) | 48 | 100.00% |
| Total votes | | 48 | 100.00% |
| Federalist hold | | | |
