= 1815 New Jersey gubernatorial election =

- October 26, 1815
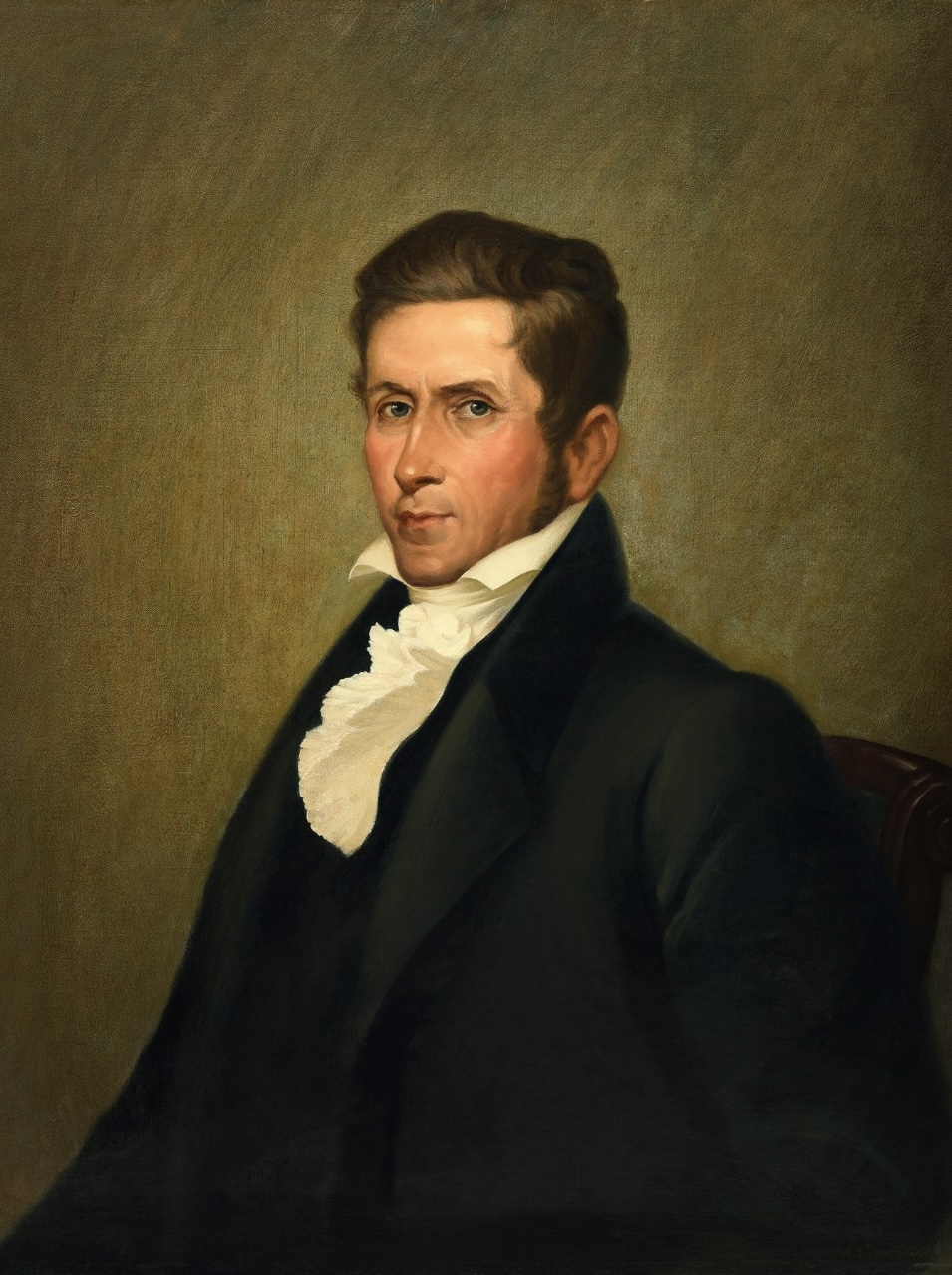
Nominee	Mahlon Dickerson
Party	Democratic-Republican
Popular vote	52
Percentage	100.00%
Governor before election
William Kennedy (Acting)
Democratic-Republican
Elected Governor
Mahlon Dickerson
Democratic-Republican

The 1815 New Jersey gubernatorial election was held on October 26, 1815, in order to elect the governor of New Jersey. Democratic-Republican nominee and former attorney general of Pennsylvania Mahlon Dickerson was elected by the New Jersey General Assembly as he ran unopposed.

== General election ==
On election day, October 26, 1815, Democratic-Republican nominee Mahlon Dickerson was elected by the New Jersey General Assembly as he ran unopposed, thereby retaining Democratic-Republican control over the office of governor. Dickerson was sworn in as the 7th governor of New Jersey that same day.

=== Results ===
New Jersey gubernatorial election, 1815
Party	Candidate	Votes	%
Democratic-Republican	Mahlon Dickerson	52	100.00%
Total votes		52	100.00%
Democratic-Republican hold			
