= 1813 New Jersey gubernatorial election =

- October 29, 1813
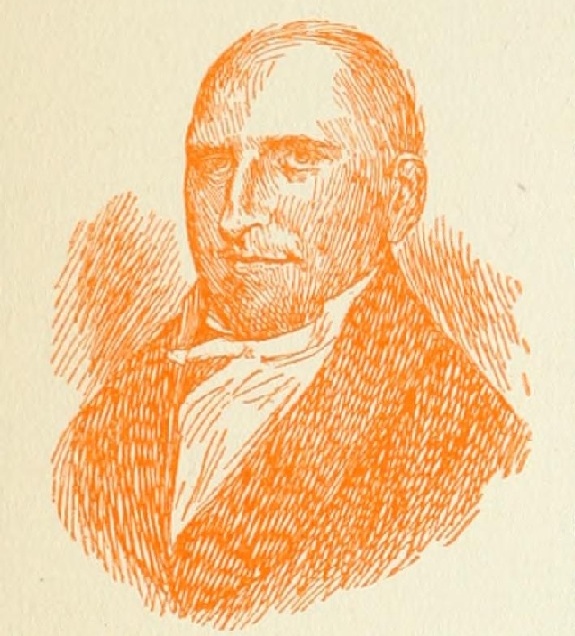

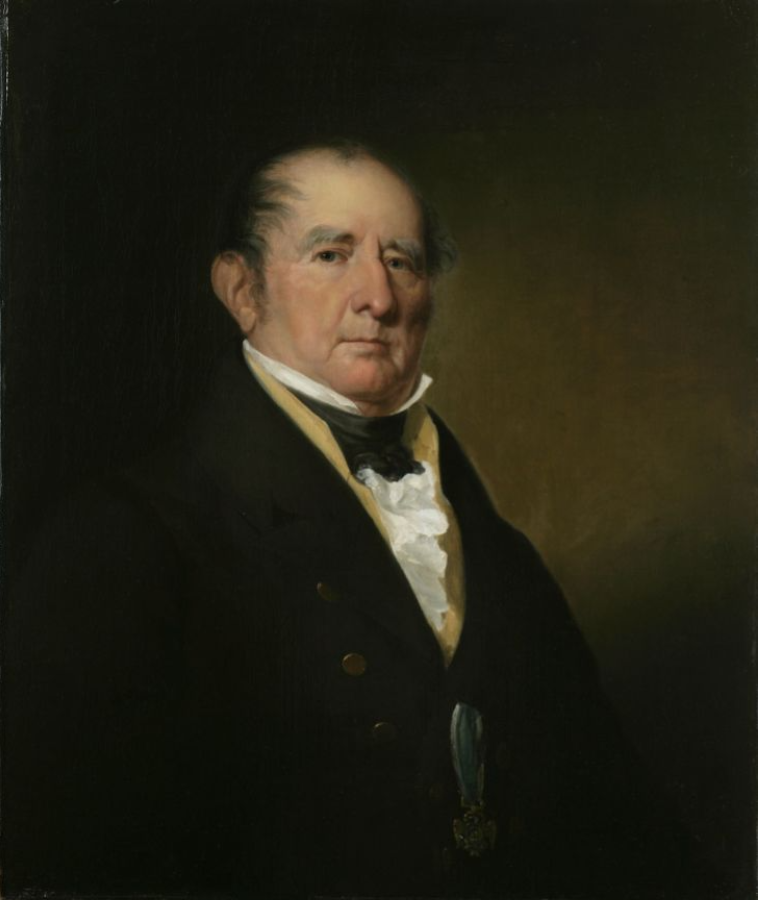
Nominee	William Sanford Pennington	Aaron Ogden
Party	Democratic-Republican	Federalist
Popular vote	30	20
Percentage	60.00%	40.00%
Governor before election
Aaron Ogden
Federalist
Elected Governor
William Sanford Pennington
Democratic-Republican

The 1813 New Jersey gubernatorial election was held on October 29, 1813, in order to elect the governor of New Jersey. Democratic-Republican nominee and former United States Attorney for the District of New Jersey William Sanford Pennington was elected by the New Jersey General Assembly against incumbent Federalist governor Aaron Ogden.

== General election ==
On election day, October 29, 1813, Democratic-Republican nominee William Sanford Pennington was elected by the New Jersey General Assembly by a margin of 10 votes against his opponent incumbent Federalist governor Aaron Ogden, thereby gaining Democratic-Republican control over the office of governor. Pennington was sworn in as the 6th governor of New Jersey that same day.

=== Results ===
New Jersey gubernatorial election, 1813
Party	Candidate	Votes	%
Democratic-Republican	William Sanford Pennington	30	60.00%
Federalist	Aaron Ogden (incumbent)	20	40.00%
Total votes		50	100.00%
Democratic-Republican gain from Federalist			
