= 1781 New Jersey gubernatorial election =

- October 30, 1781
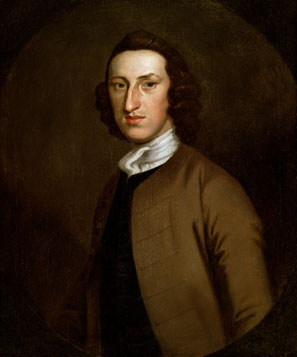
Nominee	William Livingston
Party	Nonpartisan
Popular vote	37
Percentage	100.00%
Governor before election
William Livingston
Nonpartisan
Elected Governor
William Livingston
Nonpartisan

The 1781 New Jersey gubernatorial election was held on October 30, 1781, in order to elect the Governor of New Jersey. Incumbent Governor William Livingston was easily re-elected by the New Jersey General Assembly as he ran unopposed.

== General election ==
On election day, October 30, 1781, incumbent Governor William Livingston was re-elected by the New Jersey General Assembly as he ran unopposed. Livingston was sworn in for his sixth term that same day.

=== Results ===
New Jersey gubernatorial election, 1781
Party	Candidate	Votes	%
Nonpartisan	William Livingston (incumbent)	37	100.00%
Total votes		37	100.00%
Nonpartisan hold			
