= 1784 New Jersey gubernatorial election =

- October 30, 1784
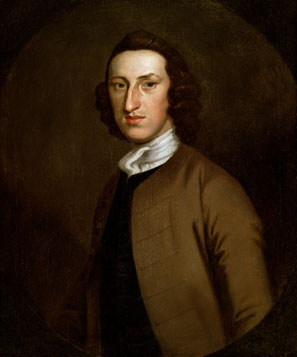

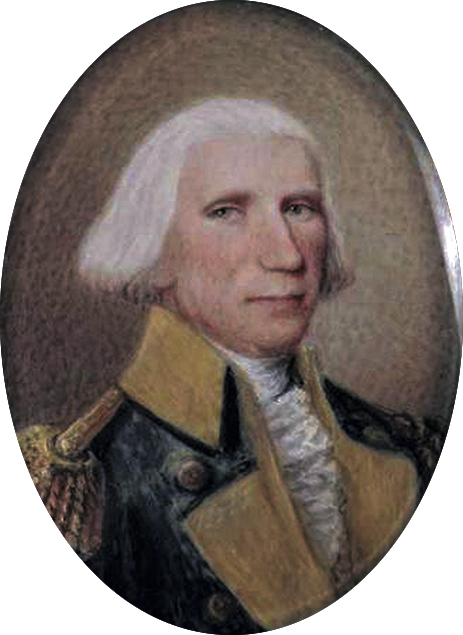
Nominee	William Livingston	Elias Dayton
Party	Nonpartisan	Nonpartisan
Popular vote	38	5
Percentage	88.37%	11.63%
Governor before election
William Livingston
Nonpartisan
Elected Governor
William Livingston
Nonpartisan

The 1784 New Jersey gubernatorial election was held on October 30, 1784, in order to elect the Governor of New Jersey. Incumbent Governor William Livingston was re-elected by the New Jersey General Assembly against his opponent candidate Elias Dayton.

== General election ==
On election day, October 30, 1784, incumbent Governor William Livingston was re-elected by the New Jersey General Assembly by a margin of 33 votes against his opponent candidate Elias Dayton. Livingston was sworn in for his ninth term that same day.

=== Results ===
New Jersey gubernatorial election, 1784
Party	Candidate	Votes	%
Nonpartisan	William Livingston (incumbent)	38	88.37%
Nonpartisan	Elias Dayton	5	11.63%
Total votes		43	100.00%
Nonpartisan hold			
