= 1814 New Jersey gubernatorial election =

- October 28, 1814
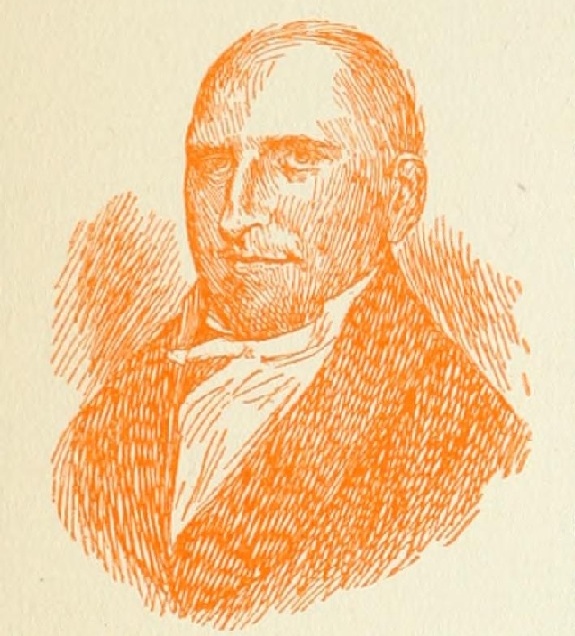

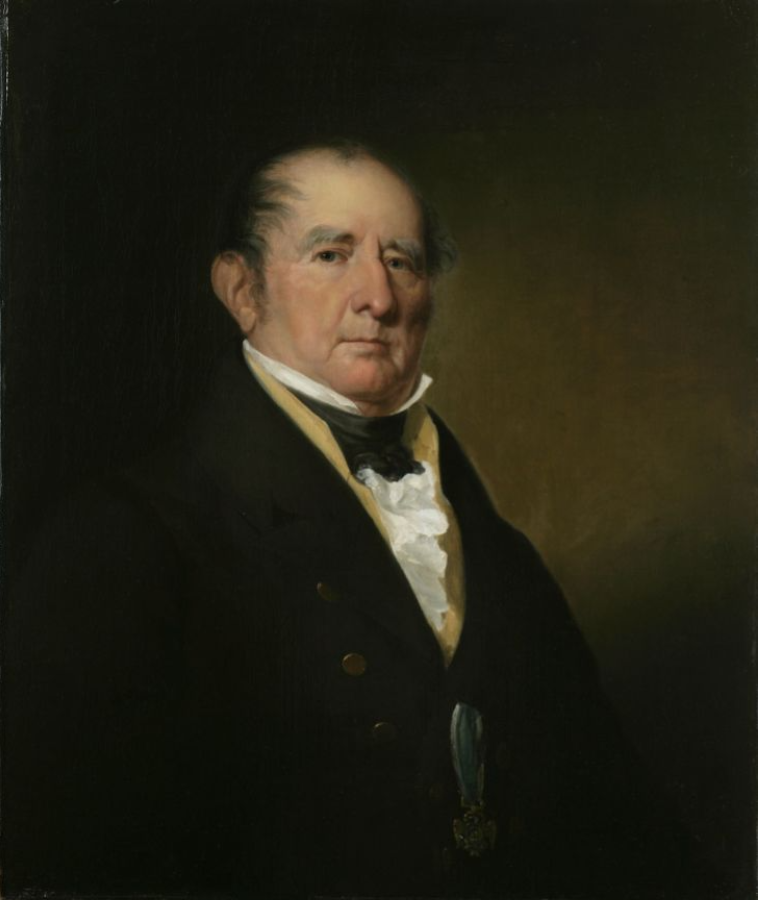
Nominee	William Sanford Pennington	Aaron Ogden
Party	Democratic-Republican	Federalist
Popular vote	29	23
Percentage	55.77%	44.23%
Governor before election
William Sanford Pennington
Democratic-Republican
Elected Governor
William Sanford Pennington
Democratic-Republican

The 1814 New Jersey gubernatorial election was held on October 28, 1814, in order to elect the governor of New Jersey. Incumbent Democratic-Republican governor William Sanford Pennington was re-elected by the New Jersey General Assembly against former Federalist governor Aaron Ogden.

== General election ==
On election day, October 28, 1814, incumbent Democratic-Republican governor William Sanford Pennington was re-elected by the New Jersey General Assembly by a margin of 6 votes against his opponent former Federalist governor Aaron Ogden, thereby retaining Democratic-Republican control over the office of governor. Pennington was sworn in for his second term that same day.

=== Results ===
New Jersey gubernatorial election, 1814
Party	Candidate	Votes	%
Democratic-Republican	William Sanford Pennington (incumbent)	29	55.77%
Federalist	Aaron Ogden	23	44.23%
Total votes		52	100.00%
Democratic-Republican hold			
