= 1816 New Jersey gubernatorial election =

- October 24, 1816
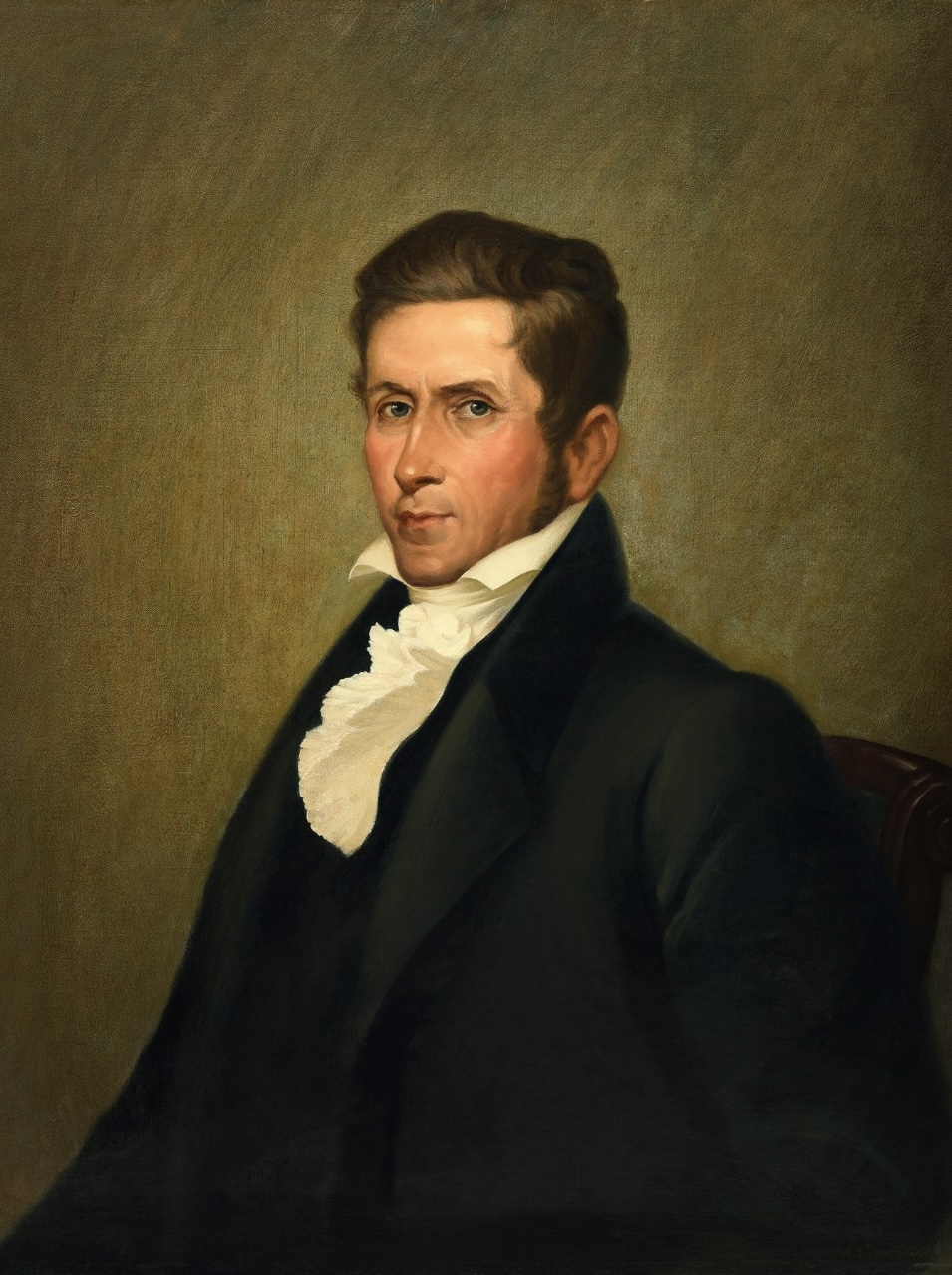
Nominee	Mahlon Dickerson
Party	Democratic-Republican
Popular vote	52
Percentage	100.00%
Governor before election
Mahlon Dickerson
Democratic-Republican
Elected Governor
Mahlon Dickerson
Democratic-Republican

The 1816 New Jersey gubernatorial election was held on October 24, 1816, in order to elect the governor of New Jersey. Incumbent Democratic-Republican governor Mahlon Dickerson was re-elected by the New Jersey General Assembly as he ran unopposed.

== General election ==
On election day, October 24, 1816, incumbent Democratic-Republican governor Mahlon Dickerson was re-elected by the New Jersey General Assembly as he ran unopposed, thereby retaining Democratic-Republican control over the office of governor. Dickerson was sworn in for his second term that same day.

=== Results ===
New Jersey gubernatorial election, 1816
Party	Candidate	Votes	%
Democratic-Republican	Mahlon Dickerson (incumbent)	52	100.00%
Total votes		52	100.00%
Democratic-Republican hold			
