= 1786 New Jersey gubernatorial election =

- October 31, 1786
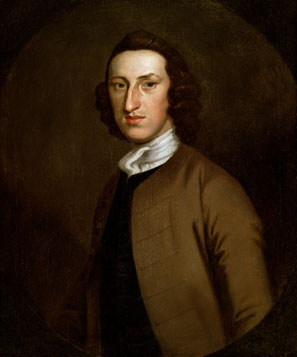

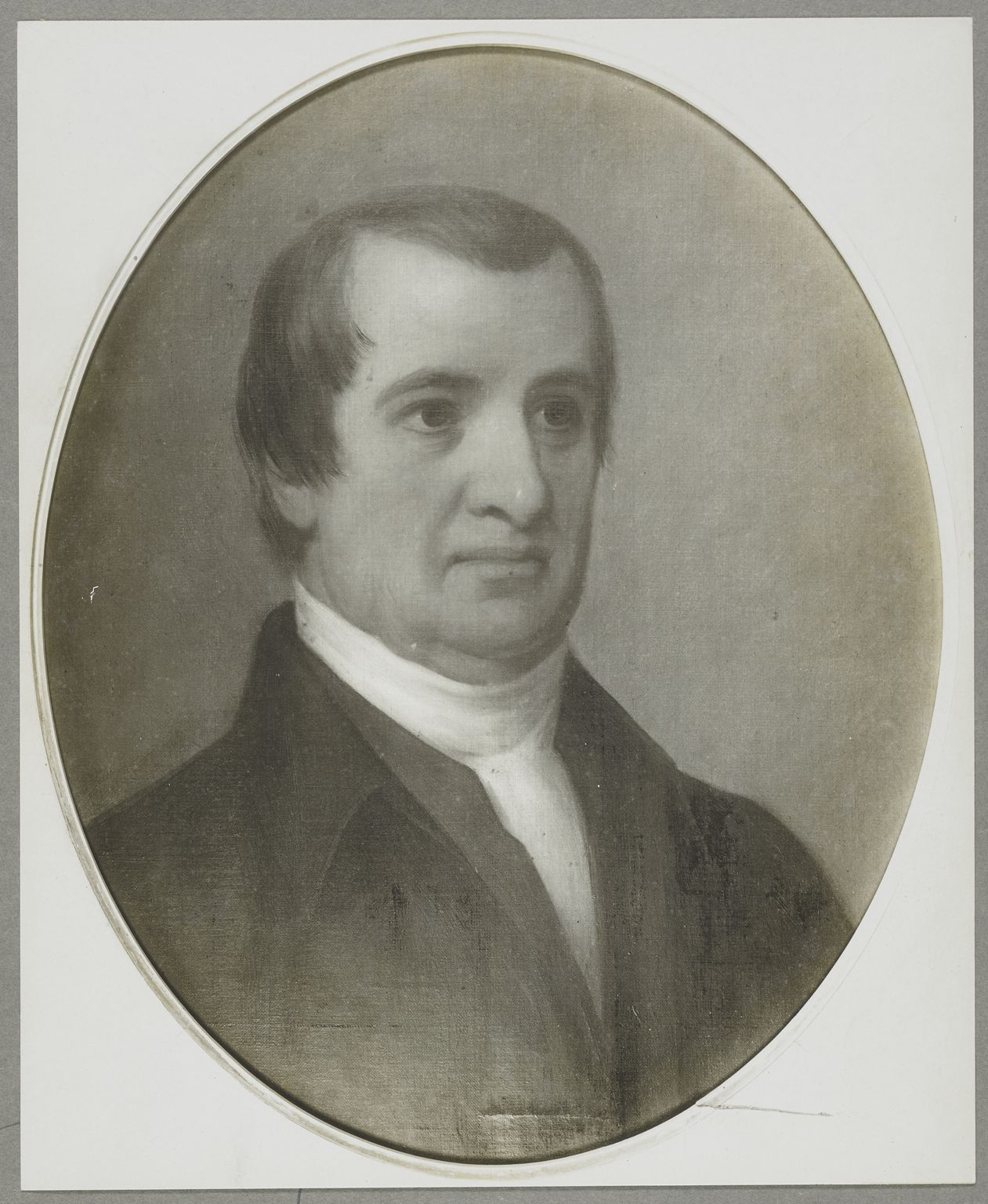
Nominee	William Livingston	Abraham Clark
Party	Nonpartisan	Nonpartisan
Popular vote	38	8
Percentage	82.61%	17.39%
Governor before election
William Livingston
Nonpartisan
Elected Governor
William Livingston
Nonpartisan

The 1786 New Jersey gubernatorial election was held on October 31, 1786, in order to elect the Governor of New Jersey. Incumbent Governor William Livingston was re-elected by the New Jersey General Assembly against his opponent candidate Abraham Clark.

== General election ==
On election day, October 31, 1786, incumbent Governor William Livingston was re-elected by the New Jersey General Assembly by a margin of 30 votes against his opponent candidate Abraham Clark. Livingston was sworn in for his eleventh term that same day.

=== Results ===
New Jersey gubernatorial election, 1786
Party	Candidate	Votes	%
Nonpartisan	William Livingston (incumbent)	38	82.61%
Nonpartisan	Abraham Clark	8	17.39%
Total votes		46	100.00%
Nonpartisan hold			
