= 1794 New Jersey gubernatorial election =

- November 6, 1794
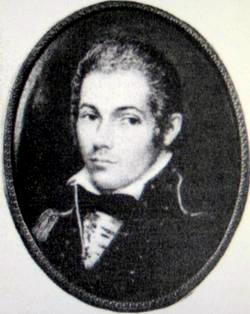

Nominee	Richard Howell	John Rutherford
Party	Federalist
Governor before election
Richard Howell
Federalist
Elected Governor
Richard Howell
Federalist

The 1794 New Jersey gubernatorial election was held on November 6, 1794, in order to elect the Governor of New Jersey. Incumbent Federalist Governor Richard Howell was re-elected by the New Jersey General Assembly against candidate John Rutherford. The exact results of this election are unknown.

== General election ==
On election day, November 6, 1794, incumbent Federalist Governor Richard Howell was re-elected by the New Jersey General Assembly against his opponent candidate John Rutherford, thereby retaining Federalist control over the office of Governor. Howell was sworn in for his second term that same day.

=== Results ===
New Jersey gubernatorial election, 1794
Party	Candidate	Votes	%
Federalist	Richard Howell (incumbent)	Unknown	Unknown
	John Rutherford	Unknown	Unknown
Total votes		48	100.00%
Federalist hold			
