= 1798 New Jersey gubernatorial election =

- November 1, 1798
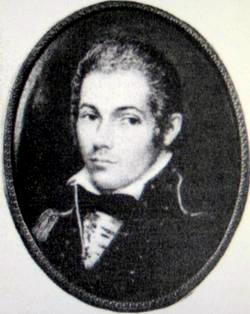
Nominee	Richard Howell
Party	Federalist
Popular vote	47
Percentage	97.92%
Governor before election
Richard Howell
Federalist
Elected Governor
Richard Howell
Federalist

The 1798 New Jersey gubernatorial election was held on November 1, 1798, in order to elect the Governor of New Jersey. Incumbent Federalist Governor Richard Howell was re-elected by the New Jersey General Assembly as he ran unopposed.

== General election ==
On election day, November 1, 1798, incumbent Federalist Governor Richard Howell was re-elected by the New Jersey General Assembly as he ran unopposed, thereby retaining Federalist control over the office of Governor. Howell was sworn in for his sixth term that same day.

=== Results ===
New Jersey gubernatorial election, 1798
Party	Candidate	Votes	%
Federalist	Richard Howell (incumbent)	47	97.92%
	Scattering	1	2.08%
Total votes		48	100.00%
Federalist hold			
