= 1787 New Jersey gubernatorial election =

- October 31, 1787
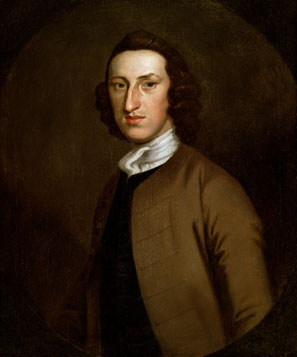
Nominee	William Livingston
Party	Nonpartisan
Popular vote	47
Percentage	97.92%
Governor before election
William Livingston
Nonpartisan
Elected Governor
William Livingston
Nonpartisan

The 1787 New Jersey gubernatorial election was held on October 31, 1787, in order to elect the Governor of New Jersey. Incumbent Governor William Livingston was re-elected by the New Jersey General Assembly against his opponent candidate Joseph Biddle.

== General election ==
On election day, October 31, 1787, incumbent Governor William Livingston was re-elected by the New Jersey General Assembly by a margin of 46 votes against his opponent candidate Joseph Biddle. Livingston was sworn in for his twelfth term that same day.

=== Results ===
New Jersey gubernatorial election, 1787
Party	Candidate	Votes	%
Nonpartisan	William Livingston (incumbent)	47	97.92%
Nonpartisan	Joseph Biddle	1	2.08%
Total votes		48	100.00%
Nonpartisan hold			
