= 1820 New Jersey gubernatorial election =

- October 26, 1820
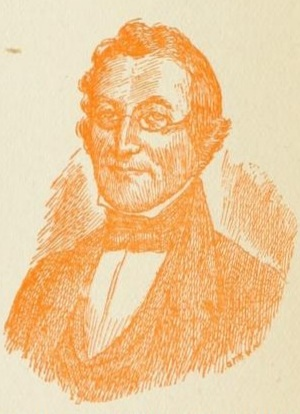
Nominee	Isaac Halstead Williamson
Party	Democratic-Republican
Popular vote	52
Percentage	100.00%
Governor before election
Isaac Halstead Williamson
Democratic-Republican
Elected Governor
Isaac Halstead Williamson
Democratic-Republican

The 1820 New Jersey gubernatorial election was held on October 26, 1820, in order to elect the governor of New Jersey. Incumbent Democratic-Republican governor Isaac Halstead Williamson was re-elected by the New Jersey General Assembly as he ran unopposed.

== General election ==
On election day, October 26, 1820, incumbent Democratic-Republican governor Isaac Halstead Williamson was re-elected by the New Jersey General Assembly as he ran unopposed, thereby retaining Democratic-Republican control over the office of governor. Williamson was sworn in for his fourth term that same day.

=== Results ===
New Jersey gubernatorial election, 1820
Party	Candidate	Votes	%
Democratic-Republican	Isaac Halstead Williamson (incumbent)	52	100.00%
Total votes		52	100.00%
Democratic-Republican hold			
