= 1832 New Jersey gubernatorial election =

- October 26, 1832
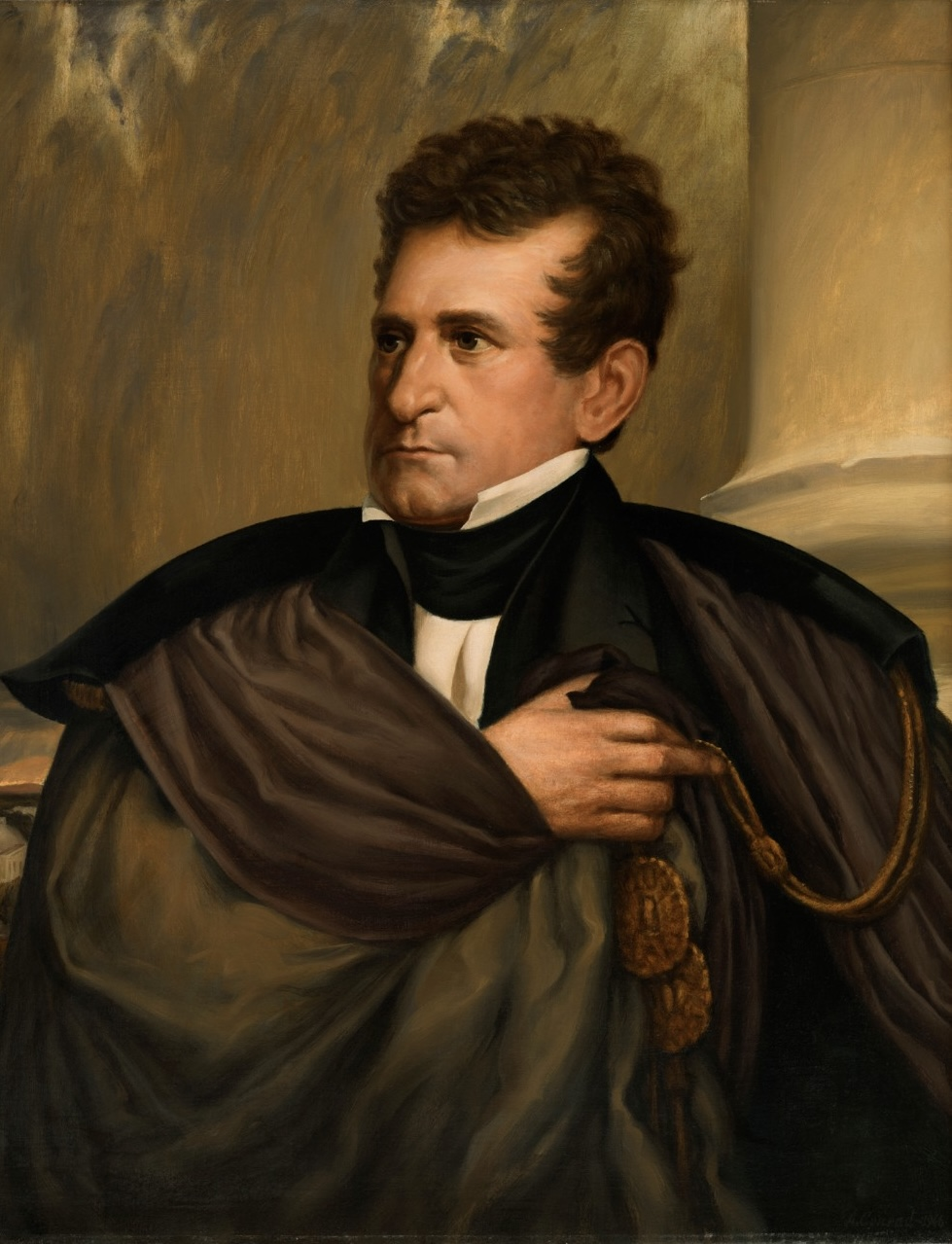

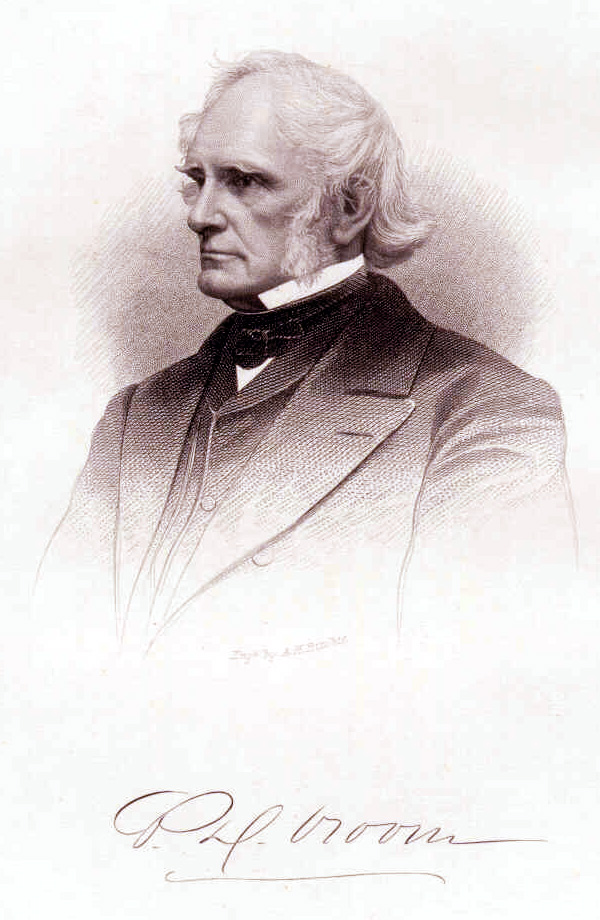
Nominee	Samuel L. Southard	Peter Dumont Vroom
Party	Whig	Democratic
Popular vote	41	23
Percentage	64.06%	35.94%
Governor before election
Peter Dumont Vroom
Democratic
Elected Governor
Samuel L. Southard
Whig

The 1832 New Jersey gubernatorial election was held on October 26, 1832, in order to elect the governor of New Jersey. Whig nominee and former United States Secretary of the Navy Samuel L. Southard was elected by the New Jersey General Assembly against incumbent Democratic governor Peter Dumont Vroom.

== General election ==
On election day, October 26, 1832, Whig nominee Samuel L. Southard was elected by the New Jersey General Assembly by a margin of 18 votes against incumbent Democratic governor Peter Dumont Vroom, thereby gaining Whig control over the office of governor. Southard was sworn in as the 10th governor of New Jersey that same day.

=== Results ===
New Jersey gubernatorial election, 1832
Party	Candidate	Votes	%
Whig	Samuel L. Southard	41	64.06%
Democratic	Peter Dumont Vroom (incumbent)	23	35.94%
Total votes		64	100.00%
Whig gain from Democratic			
