= 1842 New Jersey gubernatorial election =

- October 28, 1842
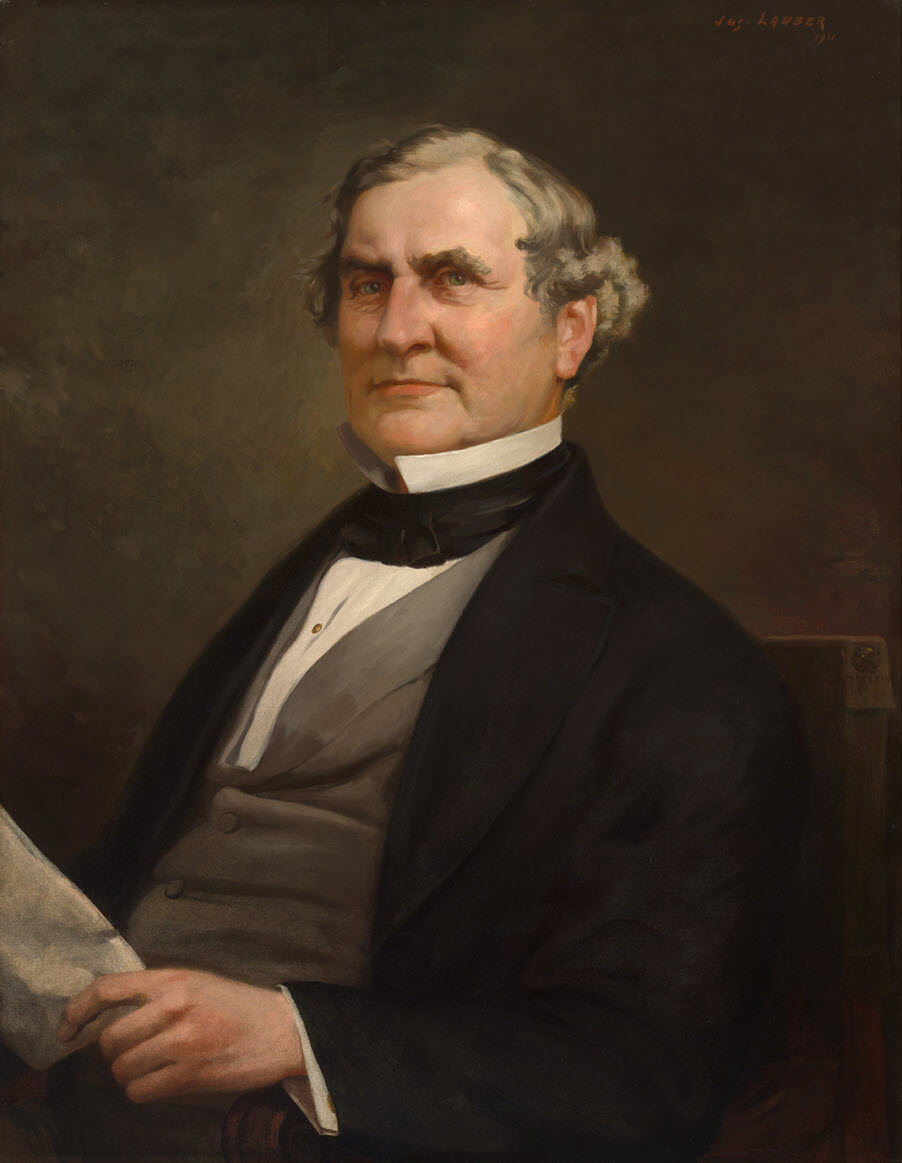
Nominee	William Pennington	Stacy G. Potts
Party	Whig	Democratic
Popular vote	42	33
Percentage	56.0%	44.0%
Governor before election
William Pennington
Whig
Elected Governor
William Pennington
Whig

The 1842 New Jersey gubernatorial election was held on October 28, 1842, in order to elect the governor of New Jersey. Incumbent Whig governor William Pennington was re-elected by the New Jersey General Assembly.

== General election ==
On election day, October 28, 1842, incumbent Whig governor William Pennington was re-elected by the New Jersey General Assembly thereby retaining Whig control over the office of governor. Pennington was sworn in for his sixth term that same day.

=== Results ===
New Jersey gubernatorial election, 1842
Party	Candidate	Votes	%
Whig	William Pennington (incumbent)	42	56.00%
Democratic	Stacy G. Potts	33	44.00℅
Total votes		58	100.00%
Whig hold			

== Sources ==
- Sobel, Robert (1978). Biographical directory of the governors of the United States, 1789-1978, Vol. III. Meckler Books. ISBN 9780930466008.
