= 1833 New Jersey gubernatorial election =

- October 25, 1833
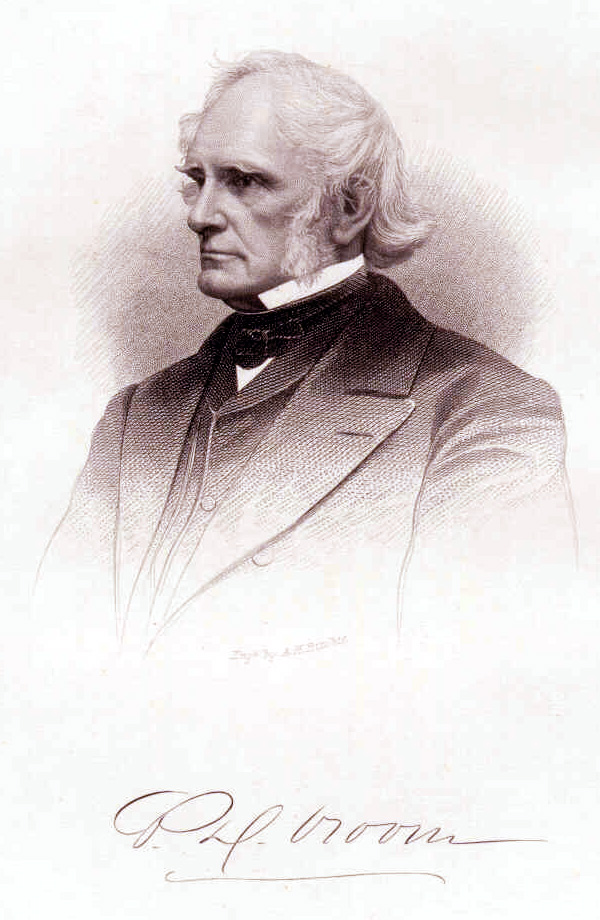
Nominee	Peter Dumont Vroom
Party	Democratic
Popular vote	64
Percentage	100.00%
Governor before election
Elias P. Seeley
Whig
Elected Governor
Peter Dumont Vroom
Democratic

The 1833 New Jersey gubernatorial election was held on October 25, 1833, in order to elect the governor of New Jersey. Former Democratic governor Peter Dumont Vroom was elected by the New Jersey General Assembly as he ran unopposed.

== General election ==
On election day, October 25, 1833, former Democratic governor Peter Dumont Vroom was elected by the New Jersey General Assembly as he ran unopposed, thereby gaining Democratic control over the office of governor. Vroom was sworn in for his fourth overall term that same day.

=== Results ===
New Jersey gubernatorial election, 1833
Party	Candidate	Votes	%
Democratic	Peter Dumont Vroom	64	100.00%
Total votes		64	100.00%
Democratic gain from Whig			
