= Governor Fort =

Governor Fort may refer to:

- George Franklin Fort (1809–1872), 16th Governor of New Jersey
- John Franklin Fort (1852–1920), 33rd Governor of New Jersey
