= Rodman M. Price =

American lawyer and politician

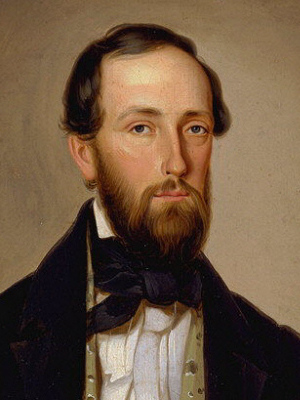
- Portrait of Price by Samuel Stillman Osgood, c. 1849–1850

17th Governor of New Jersey
- In office January 17, 1854 – January 20, 1857
- Preceded by: George Franklin Fort
- Succeeded by: William A. Newell

Member of the U.S. House of Representatives from New Jersey's 5th district
- In office March 4, 1851 – March 3, 1853
- Preceded by: James G. King
- Succeeded by: Alexander C. M. Pennington

Member of the Ayuntamiento de San Francisco
- In office August 6, 1849 – January 10, 1850

Personal details
- Born: May 5, 1816 Newton, New Jersey, U.S.
- Died: June 7, 1894 (aged 78) Oakland, New Jersey, U.S.
- Party: Democratic
- Spouse: Matilda Tranchard

Rodman McCamley Price (May 5, 1816 – June 7, 1894) was an American naval officer, businessman, and Democratic Party politician who served as the 17th Governor of New Jersey from 1854 to 1857. He also worked to establish the American government in California and served on the first San Francisco City Council, where he became a real estate tycoon. He represented New Jersey in the United States House of Representatives for one term from 1851 to 1853.

== Early life and career ==
Rodman McCamley Price was born in Newton, New Jersey on May 5, 1816. His grandfather and great-uncle were quartermasters for the Continental Army and later merchants.

He attended the public schools of New York City and the Lawrenceville Academy. Price pursued classical studies at The College of New Jersey (today Princeton University) but did not graduate due to illness. He read law but never practiced, choosing instead to enter the commission business in New York.

== Naval career, Mexican-American War, and California ==
Using family connections to the Martin Van Buren administration, Price secured an appointment as a purser in the United States Navy in 1840. His first assignments came during peacetime, and he sailed aboard the USS Fulton and USS Missouri. In July 1843, Price was aboard the Missouri on its voyage as one of the first steam warships to cross the Atlantic Ocean.

While off the coast of Gibraltar, the Missouri was wrecked in an accident, and Price spent some time as a guest of the British Consul in Gibraltar before touring the Iberian Peninsula. He met with the famous American author Washington Irving, serving as the United States Minister to Spain, and aided Irving's research on a biography of Christopher Columbus. He also visited Paris before returning to duty. Price rejoined the Navy on the sloop of war USS Cyane, part of John D. Sloat's Pacific Squadron. As purser, Price's duties were primarily to oversee payrolls; he occasionally made land at Monterey, Matamoros, or Lima to provision and bargain with local merchants.

On July 7, 1846, the Cyane entered the Mexican-American War by ferrying a detachment of United States Marines who seized Monterey, California. On the same day, Sloat, now Military Governor of California, named Price prefect and American Alcalde of Monterey, where he administered the military occupation for a month. As alcalde, Price's duties included recording land titles, and he exploited his position by acting as Sloat's investment agent and partner in the land rush that followed the American annexation.

=== San Francisco ===
In 1848, he returned to New York to secure himself an appointment as purser for the Pacific Squadron. He moved to a new headquarters in San Francisco, where he provisioned and payrolled ships between Monterey and Honolulu.

When the California gold rush hit and inflated commodity prices, the Navy expected Price to establish the hegemony of American credit and prevent the drain of gold bullion to London. Instead, he enriched himself as a real-estate tycoon and entered politics. He was elected to the first Common Council of San Francisco and became a booster of the city's Long Wharf project. In August 1849, he was "detached" from the Pacific Squadron for making unauthorized drafts on specie in the Customs House and neglecting to submit quarterly returns on expenses.

Despite his removal, Price's political career flourished. In September 1849, he was a delegate to the first of the California Constitutional Conventions and finished third in the November elections for the new state's inaugural United States Representatives. He served on the first Ayuntamiento de San Francisco from August 6, 1849, to January 10, 1850. He returned to Washington to render account, but on his return journey his steamer, the Orleans St. John, caught fire on the Alabama River. Price claimed his payroll vouchers were destroyed in the fire, muddling his case and leading to years of litigation over $88,000 in unaccounted Navy funds.

On December 28, 1849, he purchased Rancho San Geronimo from fellow naval officer Joseph Warren Revere for $7,500. The two would split the profits of timber exports from the property. On August 6. 1851, Price bought the remainder of Revere's property for $8,000. Price's move to New Jersey later inspired Revere to purchase farm land and construct The Willows, a custom mansion in Morristown, New Jersey.

== U.S. House of Representatives (1851–1853) ==
Having left California, Price purchased a mansion in Hoboken and entered a Wall Street partnership to manage his California holdings and speculated in Californian real estate. In 1850, Price's father and Robert Field Stockton, who was familiar with Price from Stockton's time as military governor, engineered Price's nomination for U.S. Representative from the state's fifth congressional district, which was composed of Bergen, Essex, Hudson, and Passaic counties. (Note: Until 1857, Essex County also included what is now Union County.) Owing to a division in the Whig Party following the Compromise of 1850, Price was narrowly elected in the usually Whig district.

Price was not an active member of the House and served one uneventful term in office, largely focusing on his California real estate deals and constituent services. He participated in only one House debate, speaking in favor of recodification of martial law aboard Navy vessels. He argued that traditional flogging led to a "well-ordered, well-disciplined ship," but that summary courts-martial should supersede the captain's power to punish at sea. He lost re-election in 1852 and returned home to focus on his property interests.

== Governor of New Jersey (1854–1857) ==
=== 1853 election ===
In 1853, Price was recruited to run for governor on the Democratic ticket. Whig critics attacked him for his ties to the "Joint Companies," a name given to the conglomerate formed by the merger of the Delaware and Raritan Canal Company with the Camden & Amboy Railroad which effectively had a monopoly on transportation, and his residence in California, which some argued disqualified him from office. The Democratic campaign focused on an opposition to monopoly and a general promise of "reform." Price was elected by a reduced but substantial margin.

=== Term in office ===
As governor, Price had little real influence against the county machines that dominated the Democratic Party or the large corporations that dominated the state. He hewed to standard Jacksonian democratic rhetoric, criticizing unbridled corporate consolidation, paper bank notes, and public spending. To fulfill his campaign pledge for reform, Price backed a Law Reform Commission to reorganize the state judiciary, reaching a compromise with Whigs to pass the reforms in exchange for more appointments of Whig judges to the bench.

Responding to Protestant nativism in the state, Price suggested that the legislature enact a limited moratorium on naturalization in the period preceding elections and ignored calls for the prohibition of liquor and saloons, provided that the legislature upheld "constitutional rights." Price favored local control on the question of slavery, particularly in Kansas, and campaigned on behalf of James Buchanan and Fernando Wood in 1856.

Price also established the first state geological survey at the urging of agricultural societies and North Jersey industrialists, defraying costs by selling maps of the state's soil and mineral resources to European investors.

==== Transportation ====
Price continued to support the Joint Companies, bargaining with Stockton to extend the corporation's charter until 1869 with the option of a state takeover in twenty years, in part to avoid disrupting the $200,000 in tax revenue that the monopoly provided to the state. He continually proposed to scrap the system of town highway commissioners in favor of countywide administration but was consistently blocked by those who relied on the highway commissions as lucrative patronage positions.

In response to outcry from Jersey shippers amid the rapid expansion of the Manhattan wharves on the Hudson River, Price and Governor of New York Myron Clark established a harbor commission to investigate whether construction was obstructing river flow and to recommend official bulkhead lines, the first in interstate port regulation. He also appointed the first pilots' board to protect Newark and Jersey City operators struggling to maintain a portion of imports from Liverpool.

==== Education ====
Price is sometimes regarded as the father of the New Jersey public school system; he responded to two decades of calls for public education by signing the first legislation establishing state normal schools, turning professional education into an important statewide lobby. His work built on the prior efforts of Democratic governors Daniel Haines and George F. Fort. Price himself participated in the 1854 Sussex Institute and urged state support for its extension to all counties. In January 1855, he called for the establishment of a state training school and drafted the bill that established the Trenton Normal School.

== Later career ==
Barred from a second term in office by the Constitution of New Jersey, Price unsuccessfully sought to serve as ambassador to Mexico under President Buchanan.

Instead, Price devoted himself to business ventures, particularly in industries which had blossomed under his policy as governor. He engaged with his business partner Horace P. Russ in quarrying his father's property on the Hackensack River, using the minerals to produce pavement for Russ construction projects in New York, Brooklyn, and Philadelphia. While still in office, Price and his father established a privately owned ferry from Weehawken to New York; its flagship vessel was named the Rodman M. Price. Price also established a barge commerce on the inland waterways of New York state and speculated in land in the south Bergen hills.

During the American Civil War, Price was largely silent on politics except to participate as one of nine delegates from the state to the Peace Conference of 1861 and an April 4, 1861 editorial urging New Jerseyans not to take up arms. He spent the remainder of his life as a gentleman farmer and struggled financially after his father's death; his various businesses failed until 1890, when the United States Congress provided him a bill of relief in his longstanding claims against the Navy. The money was immediately appropriated to settle another debt arising out of his California real estate holdings. Before his death, he spent time in a debtors' prison at the Hackensack jail.

== Death ==
Price died in Oakland, New Jersey on June 7, 1894. He was buried in the Reformed Cemetery, in Mahwah, New Jersey.

U.S. House of Representatives
Preceded by James G. King	Member of the U.S. House of Representatives from New Jersey's 5th congressional district March 4, 1851 – March 3, 1853	Succeeded by Alexander C. M. Pennington
Political offices
Preceded by George F. Fort	Governor of New Jersey; January 17, 1854 – January 20, 1857	Succeeded by William A. Newell
Party political offices
Preceded by George F. Fort	Democratic Nominee for Governor of New Jersey; 1853	Succeeded by William C. Alexander
