= Charles Stratton =

Charles Stratton may refer to:

- Charles C. Stratton (1796–1859), governor of New Jersey, 1845–1848
- General Tom Thumb (Charles Sherwood Stratton, 1838–1883), circus performer for P. T. Barnum
