= 1850 New Jersey gubernatorial election =

- November 5, 1850
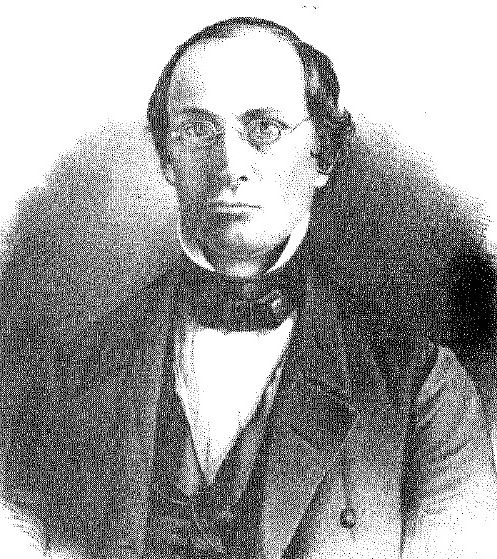

Nominee	George Franklin Fort	John Runk
Party	Democratic	Whig
Popular vote	39,726	34,054
Percentage	53.84%	46.16%
- Fort: 50–60% 60–70% 70–80% Runk: 50–60% 60–70%
Governor before election
Daniel Haines
Democratic
Elected Governor
George Franklin Fort
Democratic

The 1850 New Jersey gubernatorial election was held on November 5, 1850. Democratic nominee George Franklin Fort defeated Whig nominee John Runk with 53.84% of the vote.

== General election ==
=== Candidates ===
- George Franklin Fort, State Senator for Monmouth County (Democratic)
- John Runk, former U.S. Representative from Kingwood (Whig)

=== Results ===
New Jersey gubernatorial election, 1850
Party	Candidate	Votes	%	±%
Democratic	George Franklin Fort	39,726	53.84%	+1.96%
Whig	John Runk	34,054	46.16%	–1.96%
Majority		5,472	7.68%	+3.92%
Turnout				
Democratic hold		Swing	+1.96%	
