= 1847 New Jersey gubernatorial election =

- November 2, 1847
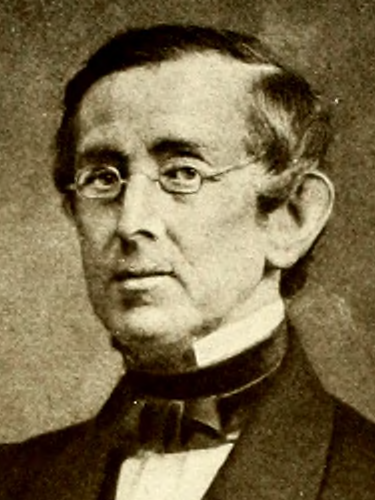

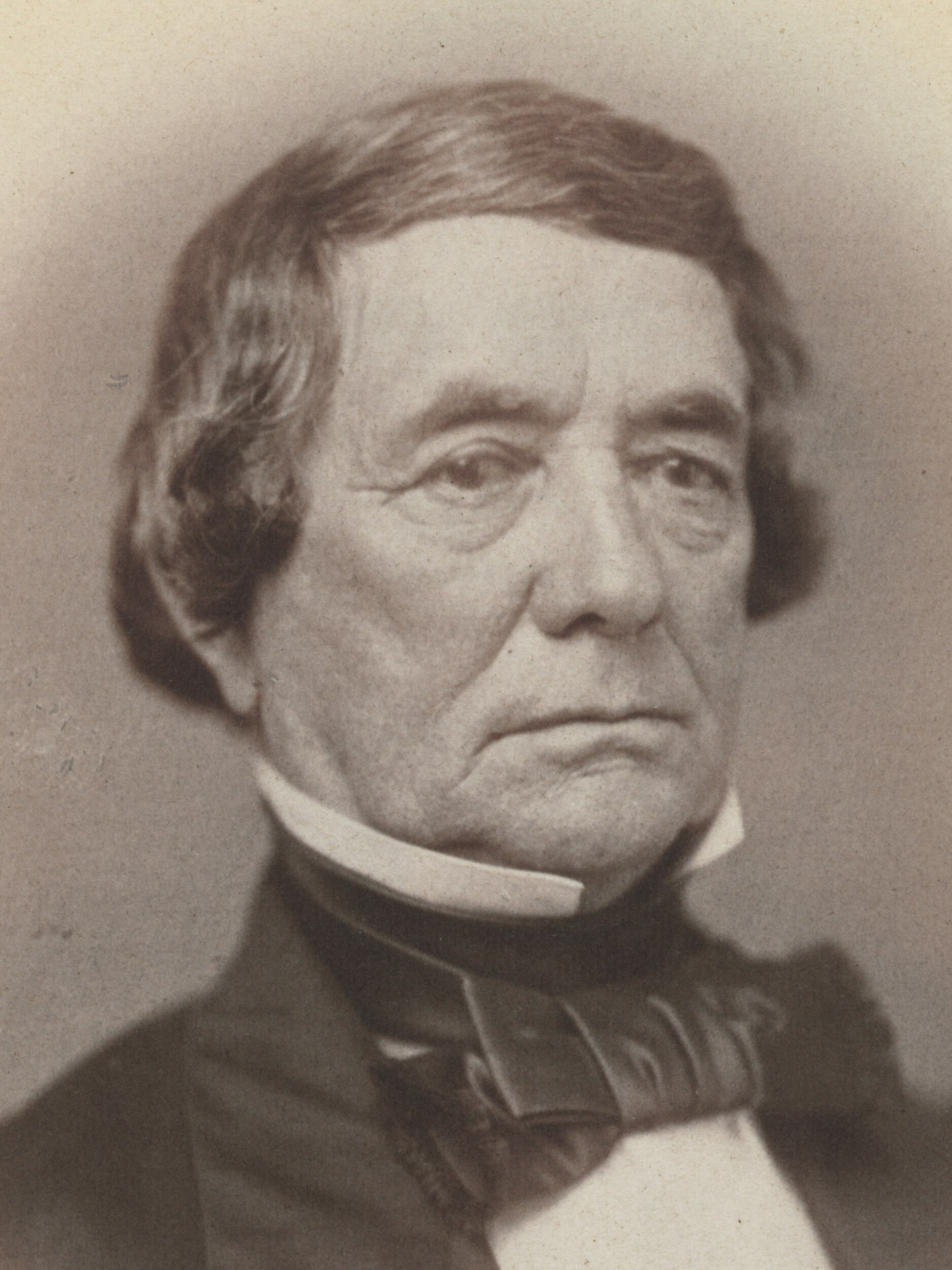
Nominee	Daniel Haines	William Wright
Party	Democratic	Whig
Popular vote	34,765	32,251
Percentage	51.88%	48.12%
- Haines: 50–60% 60–70% 70–80% Wright: 50–60% 60–70%
Governor before election
Charles C. Stratton
Whig
Elected Governor
Daniel Haines
Democratic

The 1847 New Jersey gubernatorial election was held on November 2, 1847. Democratic nominee Daniel Haines defeated Whig nominee William Wright with 51.88% of the vote.

== General election ==
=== Candidates ===
- Daniel Haines, former Governor (1843–45) (Democratic)
- William Wright, former U.S. Representative and Mayor of Newark (Whig)

=== Results ===
New Jersey gubernatorial election, 1847
Party	Candidate	Votes	%	±%
Democratic	Daniel Haines	34,765	51.88%	+2.82%
Whig	William Wright	32,251	48.12%	–2.82%
Total votes		67,016	100.00%	
Majority		2,514	3.76%	+5.64%
Turnout		67,016		
Democratic gain from Whig		Swing	+2.82%	

=== Results by county ===
County	Haines		Wright		Total	Margin	
County	Votes	Percent	Votes	Percent	Votes	Votes	Percent
Atlantic	531	58.93%	370	41.07%	901	161	17.86%
Bergen	1,138	57.16%	853	42.84%	2,145	285	14.32%
Burlington	2,550	44.94%	3,124	55.06%	5,674	–574	–10.12%
Camden	1,099	43.59%	1,422	56.41%	2,521	–332	–12.82%
Cape May	289	39.59%	441	60.41%	730	–465	–20.82%
Cumberland	1,213	46.73%	1,383	53.27%	2,596	–170	–6.54%
Essex	3,761	46.48%	4,330	53.52%	8,091	–569	–7.04%
Gloucester	803	41.84%	1,116	58.16%	1,919	–313	–16.32%
Hudson	1,064	56.81%	813	43.19%	1,873	251	13.62%
Hunterdon	2,889	61.10%	1,839	38.90%	4,728	1,050	22.20%
Mercer	1,816	46.97%	2,050	53.03%	3,866	–234	–6.06%
Middlesex	3,429	55.28%	2,774	44.72%	6,203	555	10.56%
Monmouth	2,316	48.07%	2,502	51.93%	4,818	–186	–3.86%
Morris	1,848	46.25%	2,148	53.75%	3,996	–300	–7.50%
Passaic	1,404	51.30%	1,333	48.70%	2,737	71	2.60%
Salem	1,354	46.66%	1,548	53.34%	2,902	–194	–6.68%
Somerset	1,563	46.56%	1,794	53.44%	3,357	–231	–6.88%
Sussex	3,243	74.48%	1,111	25.52%	4,354	2,132	49.96%
Warren	2,526	67.27%	1,229	32.73%	3,755	–1,297	–34.34%
Total	34,765	51.88%	32,251	48.12%	67,016	2,514	3.76%

Counties that flipped from Democratic to Whig

- Monmouth

Counties that flipped from Whig to Democratic

- Middlesex
- Passaic
- Hudson
