= Ferdinand Schureman Schenck =

American politician (1790–1860)

Member of the U.S. House of Representatives from New Jersey's at-large district
- In office March 4, 1833 – March 3, 1837
- Preceded by: Thomas H. Hughes
- Succeeded by: Charles C. Stratton

Personal details
- Born: February 11, 1790 Millstone, New Jersey, U.S.
- Died: May 16, 1860 (aged 70) Camden, New Jersey, U.S.
- Resting place: Pleasant Plains, New Jersey, U.S.
- Party: Democrat; Republican
- Relations: Mary Schenck Woolman (granddaughter)
- Education: Columbia University College of Physicians and Surgeons
- Profession: Physician

Ferdinand Schureman Schenck (February 11, 1790 – May 16, 1860) was an American medical doctor and politician who represented New Jersey in the United States House of Representatives for two terms from 1833 to 1837.

== Early life ==
Ferdinand Schureman Schenck was born on February 11, 1790, in Millstone, New Jersey. He completed preparatory studies and studied medicine at the Columbia University College of Physicians and Surgeons in New York City. He graduated in 1814.

== Career ==
Schenck commenced the practice of medicine at Six Mile Run, New Jersey (now Franklin Township, Somerset County, New Jersey).

Schenck was a member of the New Jersey General Assembly 1829–1831. He was elected as a Jacksonian to the Twenty-third and Twenty-fourth Congresses, serving in office from March 4, 1833 – March 3, 1837, but was not a candidate for renomination.

He later served as a trustee of Rutgers College, New Brunswick, New Jersey, from 1841 to 1860. In addition, he was a member of the New Jersey constitutional convention in 1844 and judge of the New Jersey Court of Errors and Appeals from 1845 to 1857. He was an unsuccessful Republican candidate for the New Jersey Senate in 1856. He continued the practice of medicine until retiring in the fall of 1859. He was involved in banking and manufacturing in Newark.

== Personal life ==
Schenck had at least one son, J. V.

Schenck died following heart trouble on May 16, 1860, at the home of his son in Camden, New Jersey. He was buried in a private cemetery at Pleasant Plains, New Jersey.

U.S. House of Representatives
Preceded by Thomas H. Hughes	Member of the U.S. House of Representatives from New Jersey's at-large congressional district 1833–1837	Succeeded by Charles C. Stratton
