= 1853 New Jersey gubernatorial election =

- November 1, 1853
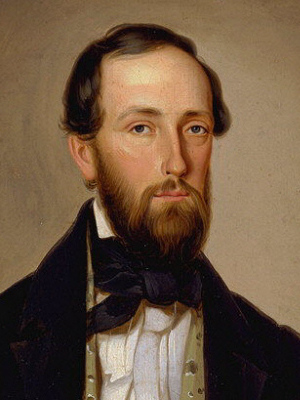

Nominee	Rodman M. Price	Joel Haywood
Party	Democratic	Whig
Popular vote	38,312	34,530
Percentage	52.60%	47.40%
- County results Price: 50–60% 60–70% 70–80% Haywood: 50–60% 60–70% 70–80%
Governor before election
George Franklin Fort
Democratic
Elected Governor
Rodman M. Price
Democratic

The 1853 New Jersey gubernatorial election was held on November 1, 1853. Democratic nominee Rodman M. Price defeated Whig nominee Joel Haywood with 52.60% of the vote.

== General election ==
=== Candidates ===
- Joel Haywood (Whig)
- Rodman M. Price, former U.S. Representative from Hoboken and member of the San Francisco, California ayuntamiento (Democratic)

=== Results ===
New Jersey gubernatorial election, 1853
Party	Candidate	Votes	%	±%
Democratic	Rodman M. Price	38,312	52.60%	−1.24%
Whig	Joel Haywood	34,530	47.40%	+1.24%
Majority		3,782	5.20%	−2.48%
Turnout				
Democratic hold		Swing		
