= Matoaca =

Matoaca may refer to:

== People ==
- Pocahontas, Matoaca Rebecca Rolf
- Matoaca Gay, 19th Century United States society writer and Shakespeare scholar

== Other ==
- Matoaca, Virginia, a census-designated place (CDP) in Chesterfield County, Virginia, United States
- Matoaca High School, a secondary school in Matoaca, Virginia
