= John C. Ten Eyck =

American politician

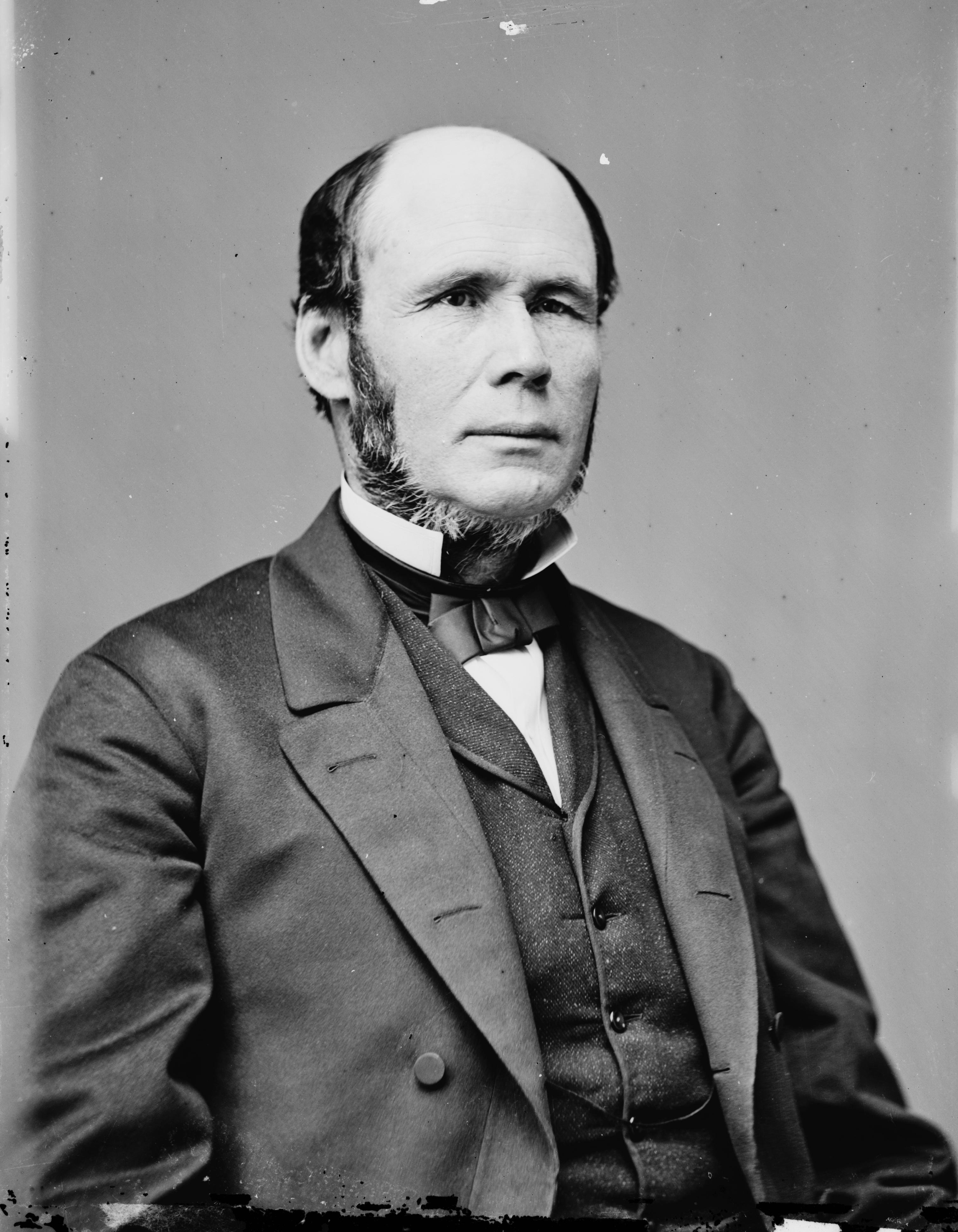

United States Senator from New Jersey
- In office March 4, 1859 – March 3, 1865
- Preceded by: William Wright
- Succeeded by: John P. Stockton

President of the Commission to Revise the Constitution of New Jersey
- In office July 8, 1873 – November 18, 1873
- Preceded by: Abraham O. Zabriskie
- Succeeded by: None (Commission's term of service complete)

Prosecutor of the Pleas for Burlington County, New Jersey
- In office 1839–1849
- Preceded by: Elias B. Cannon
- Succeeded by: Garrit S. Cannon

Personal details
- Born: March 12, 1814 Freehold Township, New Jersey, U.S.
- Died: August 24, 1879 (aged 65) Mount Holly Township, New Jersey, U.S.
- Resting place: St. Andrew's Cemetery, Mount Holly, New Jersey
- Party: Whig (before 1855); Republican (after 1855)
- Spouse: Julia Gadsby (m. 1845)
- Children: 6
- Profession: Attorney

Military service
- Allegiance: United States (Union); New Jersey
- Branch/service: New Jersey Militia
- Years of service: 1863
- Rank: Private
- Unit: Ten Eyck Guards
- Battles/wars: American Civil War: Defense of Pennsylvania

John Conover Ten Eyck (March 12, 1814 – August 24, 1879) was a United States Senator from New Jersey from 1859 to 1865, during the American Civil War. He was a member of the Republican Party.

== Early life ==
John Ten Eyck was born in Freehold Township, New Jersey, and was the son of William Ten Eyck and Leah (Conover) Ten Eyck. The Dutch American Ten Eyck family (pronounced "Ten Ike") was long prominent in law, business and politics, particularly in New York and New Jersey. John C. Ten Eyck completed preparatory studies under private tutors, studied law with Joseph Fitz Randolph, and was admitted to the bar in 1835.

Ten Eyck established a successful law practice in Burlington, New Jersey, first in partnership with Garret D. Wall, and later as the sole member of his own firm. Originally a Whig, he was prosecuting attorney of Burlington County from 1839 to 1849, and was a delegate to the New Jersey constitutional convention of 1844. Ten Eyck joined the Republican Party at its founding in the 1850s, and was a supporter of John C. Frémont in the 1856 presidential election.

== U.S. Senator ==
Ten Eyck served in the U.S. Senate from March 4, 1859, to March 3, 1865, after winning election in a joint session of the New Jersey State Legislature, which met in January 1859. The anti-slavery Opposition Party, which consisted of members of the new Republican Party, traditional Whigs, members of the Free Soil Party, and members of the American Party vied with Democrats for control of the legislature and selection of a U.S. senator. With none of the Opposition groups strong enough to elect a candidate on their own, but determined to prevent the re-election of William Wright or the election of another Democrat, the Opposition eventually decided to agree on a compromise candidate who had no strong ties to any faction. They selected Ten Eyck, who was not an active candidate, but was known to have been a Whig, and more recently a Republican, yet not politically prominent in recent years or strongly committed to any Opposition faction. Members of the American Party were especially unhappy at being unable to elect John F. Randolph or another American candidate, but accepted Ten Eyck to ensure that a Democrat would not win the seat.

During his Senate career, which spanned the American Civil War, Ten Eyck served on the Judiciary and Commerce committees. He entered the Senate as a presumed moderate, and opposed allowing slavery to expand, but believed the Constitution permitted it where it existed. He also supported enforcement of the Fugitive Slave Act of 1850 even though he was personally opposed to it, on the grounds that he believed it was constitutional. Over time, his anti-slavery views became more pronounced. When the New Jersey State Legislature passed early 1861 resolutions in support of the Crittenden Compromise, Ten Eyck complied with the legislature's instructions to transmit them to the Senate, but made clear that he believed they were unconstitutional. Ten Eyck voted to end slavery in Washington, D.C., and voted in favor of the Thirteenth Amendment, which abolished slavery in the United States.

When soldiers of the Confederate States Army invaded Pennsylvania in the summer of 1863, Ten Eyck advocated immediate creation of a Burlington County militia unit to take part in Pennsylvania's defense. He enlisted as a private in order to set an example for those in attendance, and they called the unit they created the "Ten Eyck Guards" in his honor. He marched to Pennsylvania with the company, and once the Confederates had retreated, he completed his term of service upon the return of the Ten Eyck Guards to Burlington County.

== Post-Senate career ==
After leaving the Senate, Ten Eyck resumed practicing law. He was a delegate to the 1866 National Union Convention, which attempted unsuccessfully to promote post-Civil War reconciliation, including unity behind the Reconstruction policies of President Andrew Johnson. In 1873, he was appointed to the commission that revised the Constitution of New Jersey, and served as its president following the death his predecessor. The commission submitted its proposed changes to the state legislature, who presented to them voters for ratification. The changes were approved in an 1875 election, and went into effect soon afterwards.

== Death and burial ==
Ten Eyck died at his home in Mount Holly Township, New Jersey on August 24, 1879. and was interred in Mount Holly's St. Andrew's Cemetery.

== Family ==
On June 10, 1845, Ten Eyck married Julia Gadsby, the daughter of John Gadsby and Providence (Norris) Gadsby. They were the parents of six children—Augusta (1846-1876), Julia (1847-1941), Jane (1849-1918), May (1850-1951), Virginia, and John (1855-1935).

== Sources ==
- United States Congress. "John C. Ten Eyck (id: T000122)". Biographical Directory of the United States Congress.
- Guide to the John C. Ten Eyck Papers at New Jersey Historical Society

U.S. Senate
Preceded by William Wright	U.S. senator (Class 2) from New Jersey; 1859–1865; Served alongside: John R. Thomson, Richard S. Field, James W. Wall, William Wright	Succeeded by John P. Stockton
Preceded by Elias B. Cannon	Prosecutor of the Pleas for Burlington County, New Jersey; 1839-1849	Succeeded by Garrit S. Cannon
