= George Sykes (New Jersey politician) =

American politician (1802–1880)

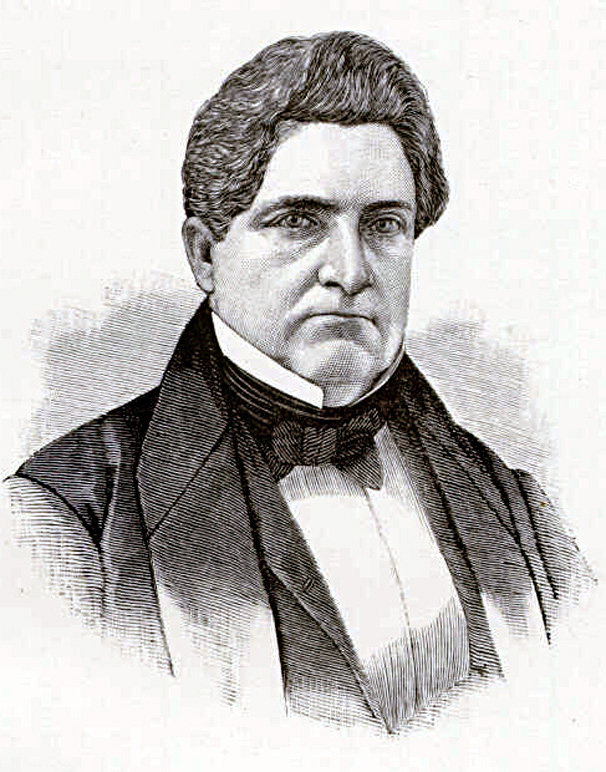
- George Sykes

Member of the U.S. House of Representatives from New Jersey's 2nd district
- In office March 4, 1843 – March 3, 1845
- Preceded by: Six congressmen elected statewide on the Whig Party's general ticket: John Bancker Aycrigg; William Halstead; John Patterson Bryan Maxwell; Joseph Fitz Randolph; Charles C. Stratton; Thomas J. Yorke
- Succeeded by: Samuel G. Wright (W)
- In office November 4, 1845 – March 3, 1847
- Preceded by: Samuel G. Wright (W)
- Succeeded by: William A. Newell (W)

Member of the New Jersey General Assembly
- In office 1877–1879

Personal details
- Born: September 20, 1802 Sykesville, New Jersey, U.S.
- Died: February 25, 1880 (aged 77) Mansfield Township, Burlington County, New Jersey, U.S.
- Party: Democratic
- Profession: Politician

George Sykes (September 20, 1802 – February 25, 1880) was an American Democratic Party politician who represented New Jersey's 2nd congressional district in the United States House of Representatives from 1843 to 1845, and was reelected in 1845 to fill a vacancy, serving until 1847.

== Biography ==
Sykes was born in Sykesville, in North Hanover Township on September 20, 1802. He was educated by private teachers, and became a surveyor and conveyancer.

=== Congress ===
He was elected as a Democrat to the Twenty-eighth Congress, serving in office from March 4, 1843, to March 3, 1845. He was elected to the Twenty-ninth Congress to fill the vacancy caused by the death of Samuel G. Wright, and served from November 4, 1845, to March 3, 1847.

=== USS Princeton incident ===
He was a passenger aboard the USS Princeton on February 28, 1844, when one of its guns exploded killing six, including two members of President John Tyler's cabinet.

== Later career and death ==
After leaving Congress, he served as a member of the council of properties of West Jersey and was a member of the New Jersey General Assembly from 1877 to 1879. He died near Mansfield Township, on February 25, 1880, and was interred in Old Upper Springfield Friends Burying Ground near Wrightstown, New Jersey.

U.S. House of Representatives
Preceded by District created	Member of the U.S. House of Representatives from New Jersey's 2nd congressional district March 4, 1843 – March 3, 1845	Succeeded by Samuel G. Wright
Preceded by Samuel G. Wright	Member of the U.S. House of Representatives from New Jersey's 2nd congressional district November 4, 1845 – March 3, 1847	Succeeded by William A. Newell
