= Isaac G. Farlee =

American politician (1787–1855)

Isaac Gray Farlee

Member of the U.S. House of Representatives from New Jersey's 3rd district
- In office March 4, 1843 – March 3, 1845
- Preceded by: John Bancker Aycrigg; William Halstead; John Patterson Bryan Maxwell; Joseph Fitz Randolph; Charles C. Stratton; Thomas J. Yorke (Elected statewide on a Whig Party general ticket)
- Succeeded by: John Runk (W)

Member of the New Jersey General Assembly
- In office 1819; 1821; 1828; 1830

Members of the New Jersey Senate
- In office 1847-1849

Personal details
- Born: May 18, 1787 Whitehouse, New Jersey
- Died: January 12, 1855 (aged 67) Flemington, New Jersey, U.S.
- Party: Democratic
- Profession: Politician

Isaac Gray Farlee (May 18, 1787 – January 12, 1855) was a U.S. representative from New Jersey for one term from 1843 to 1845.

== Biography ==
Born in the Whitehouse section of Readington Township, Farlee attended the public schools.

He engaged in mercantile pursuits in Flemington. He served as member of the New Jersey General Assembly in 1819, 1821, 1828, and 1830 and served as clerk of Hunterdon County from 1830 to 1840, and was a Brigadier general of the State militia.

Farlee was elected as a Democrat to the Twenty-eighth Congress, serving in office from March 4, 1843, to March 3, 1845, but was an unsuccessful candidate for reelection in 1844 to the Twenty-ninth Congress. He lost the 1844 race by just 16 votes and he contested the election on the grounds that enough Princeton students, who were ineligible due to residency, had voted to swing the election. While some on the committee agreed, his contest was narrowly decided against him in the full House.

He served as member of the New Jersey Senate from 1847 to 1849, and served as judge of the Court of Common Pleas from 1852 to 1855.

== Death ==
He died in Flemington on January 12, 1855, and was interred in the Presbyterian Cemetery.

U.S. House of Representatives
Preceded by At-large	Member of the U.S. House of Representatives from New Jersey's 3rd congressional district 1843–1845	Succeeded by John Runk
