= Gov. Charles C. Stratton House =

Historic house in New Jersey, United States

- U.S. National Register of Historic Places
- New Jersey Register of Historic Places
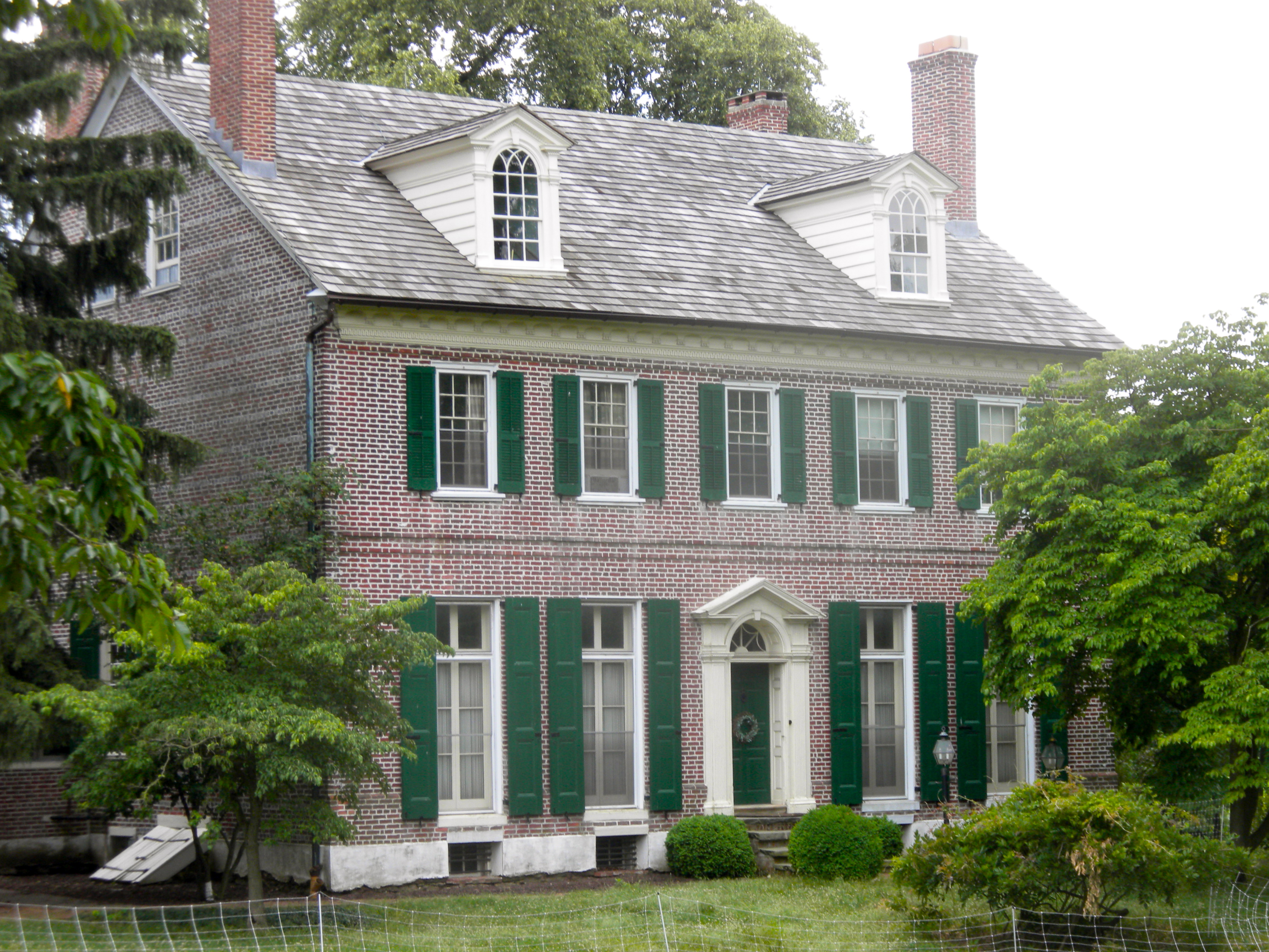

- Location within Gloucester County, New Jersey Location within New Jersey Location within the United States
- Location: 538 Kings Highway, Woolwich Township, New Jersey
- Coordinates: 39°45′7″N 75°18′10″W
- Area: 13 acres (5.3 ha)
- Built: c. 1794
- Architectural style: Federal
- NRHP reference No.: 73001101
- NJRHP No.: 1444

Significant dates
- Added to NRHP: January 29, 1973
- Designated NJRHP: May 1, 1972

The Gov. Charles C. Stratton House, also known as Stratton Hall or Stratton Mansion, is located at 538 Kings Highway, near Swedesboro, in Woolwich Township, Gloucester County, New Jersey, United States. The house was built c. 1794 and documented by the Historic American Buildings Survey (HABS) in 1936. It was added to the National Register of Historic Places on January 29, 1973, for its significance in architecture and politics. The house was the home of New Jersey Governor Charles C. Stratton.

== History and description ==
The house is a two and one-half story brick house with Flemish bond and featuring Federal architecture. It was built c. 1794 near Raccoon Creek by Doctor James Stratton. His son, Charles C. Stratton, was born here in 1796 and lived here the rest of his life. He became the first governor of New Jersey under the new state constitution of 1844, which provided for the direct election of the governor.

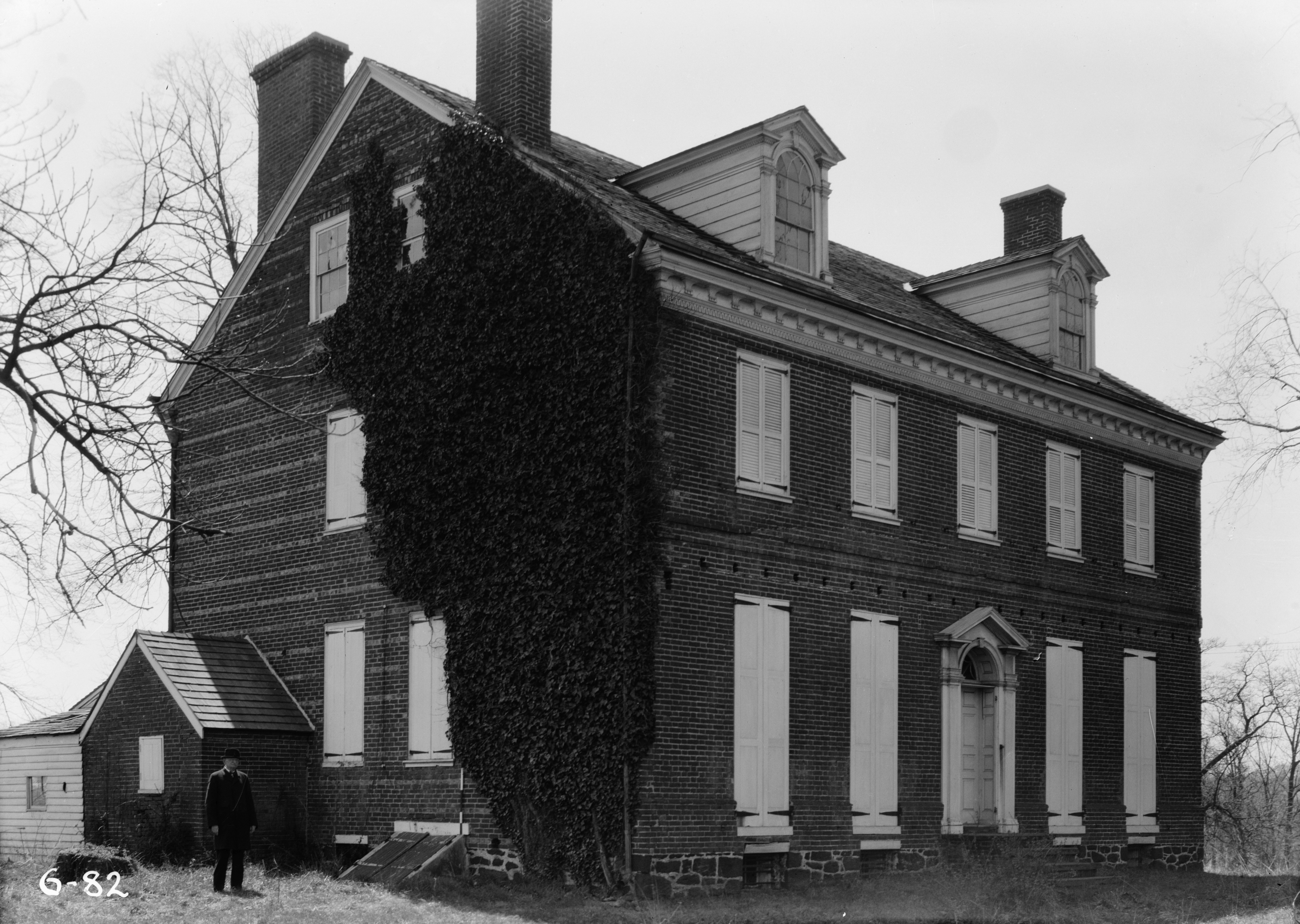
HABS photo from 1936

== See also ==
- National Register of Historic Places listings in Gloucester County, New Jersey
