= Thomas H. Hughes =

American politician

Member of the U.S. House of Representatives from New Jersey's at-large district
- In office March 4, 1829 – March 3, 1833
- Preceded by: Ebenezer Tucker
- Succeeded by: Ferdinand S. Schenck

Member of the New Jersey Legislative Council
- In office 1824–1825
- Preceded by: Hedge Thompson
- Succeeded by: Samuel Fowler
- In office 1819–1823
- Preceded by: James Matlack
- Succeeded by: Hedge Thompson

Member of the New Jersey General Assembly
- In office 1805-1807, 1809, 1812-1813

Sheriff of Cape May County
- In office 1801–1804
- Preceded by: Jonathan Leaming
- Succeeded by: Joseph Hildreth

Personal details
- Born: Thomas Hurst Hughes; January 10, 1769
- Died: November 10, 1839 (aged 70)
- Resting place: Cold Spring Presbyterian Church
- Party: Anti-Jacksonian

Thomas Hurst Hughes (January 10, 1769 – November 10, 1839) was an 18th- and 19th-century American businessman and politician who served two terms as a U.S. representative from New Jersey from 1829 to 1833.

== Biography ==
Born in the Cold Spring, New Jersey, on January 10, 1769, Hughes attended the public schools. He moved to Cape May City in 1800 and engaged in the mercantile business.

In 1816 he built Congress Hall in Cape May, which he managed for many years. He also served as sheriff of Cape May County from 1801 to 1804.

=== New Jersey Legislature ===
Hughes was a member of the New Jersey General Assembly from 1805 to 1807, in 1809, 1812, and 1813; and a member of the New Jersey Legislative Council (now the New Jersey Senate) from 1819 to 1823 and in 1824 and 1825.

== Congress ==
He was elected as an Anti-Jacksonian candidate to the Twenty-first and Twenty-second Congresses, serving in office from March 4, 1829 to March 3, 1833. As he was not a candidate for renomination in 1832.

== After Congress ==
He resumed the hotel business, dying in Cold Spring on November 10, 1839. His interment is in the Cold Spring Presbyterian Cemetery.

== Sources ==
- Biography at the Biographical Directory of the United States Congress

U.S. House of Representatives
Preceded by Ebenezer Tucker	Member of the U.S. House of Representatives from New Jersey's at-large congressional district 1829–1833	Succeeded by Ferdinand S. Schenck
