= Josephine Ward Thomson =

American historic preservationist and philanthropist

Josephine Antoinette Ward Thomson Swann
- Born: c. 1828; Sing Sing, New York, US
- Died: March 2, 1906; Washington, D.C., US
- Other names: Josephine Ward Thomson
- Known for: Philanthropy, Wife of Governor of Maryland Thomas Swann

Josephine Antoinette Ward was born c. 1828 at Sing Sing, Westchester County, New York. She was the eldest child of Aaron Ward and Mary Watson Ward.

== Career ==
Ward was interested in history and was the founder of the Princeton chapter of the Daughters of the American Revolution. This lineage society supported preservation and recognition of sites and properties important to American history.

She was also the first benefactor of the Princeton University Graduate College.

With Kate McFarlane, Ward organized the Washington Headquarters Association of Rocky Hill. They helped preserve Rockingham, the final headquarters of General George Washington during the Revolutionary War. After passing into private hands in the mid-19th century, it was bought by a quarry and used for worker housing. Ward and McFarlane raised money to buy the house and move it away from the quarry, which would undermine it.

== Marriage and family, private life ==
In 1845 Ward married the widower and US Senator John R. Thomson (R-NJ). He died in 1862. She continued to live in the Washington, DC area.

In 1878, Ward Thomson married the widower Thomas Swann. She was the second wife of the former Governor of Maryland. Some of the groom's family said this was a sign of "insanity growing out of dotage." The Governor was 72 at the time of the marriage. The couple separated in 1880.

Ward Thomson was a frequent participant in Miss Matoaca Gay's Shakespeare seminars in Washington, DC during the 1880s and 1890s.

She died 2 March 1906 in Washington, D.C. and is buried at Princeton, New Jersey.
