= Daniel Haines =

American politician, jurist, lawyer and Governor of New Jersey (1801-1877)

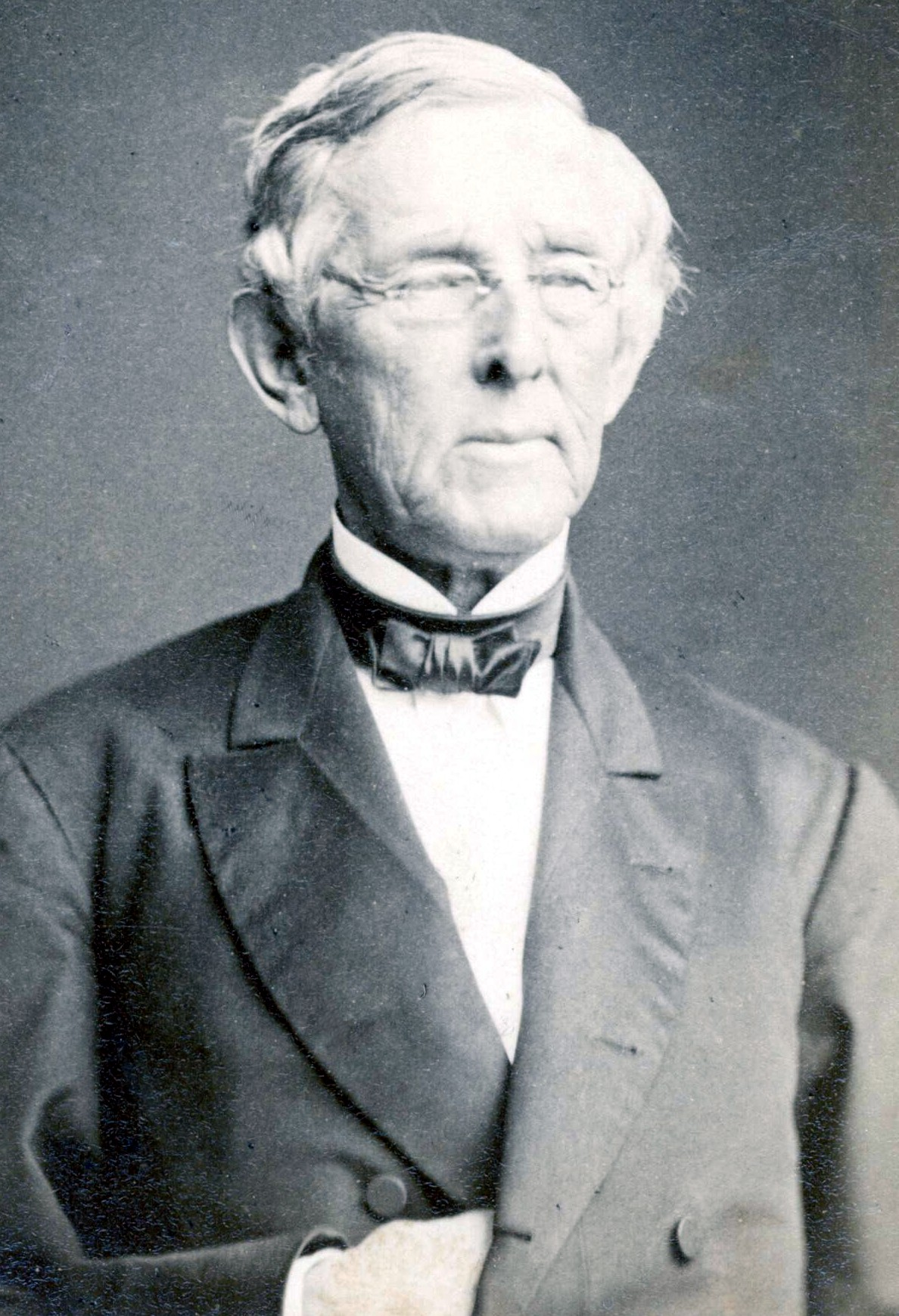
- Haines c. 1870

14th Governor of New Jersey
- In office January 18, 1848 – January 21, 1851
- Preceded by: Charles C. Stratton
- Succeeded by: George Franklin Fort
- In office October 27, 1843 – January 21, 1845
- Preceded by: William Pennington
- Succeeded by: Charles C. Stratton

Associate Justice of the New Jersey Supreme Court
- In office November 1852 – 1866
- Appointed by: George Franklin Fort
- Preceded by: Joseph Fitz Randolph
- Succeeded by: David A. Depue

Member of the New Jersey Legislative Council from Sussex County
- In office 1839–1840

Personal details
- Born: January 6, 1801 New York City, U.S.
- Died: January 26, 1877 (aged 76) Hamburg, New Jersey, U.S.
- Party: Federalist (before 1824); Democratic
- Education: Princeton University

Daniel Haines (January 6, 1801 – January 26, 1877) was an American attorney, jurist, and politician who served as the 14th governor of New Jersey in nonconsecutive terms in office from 1843 to 1845 and 1848 to 1851. During his first term, Haines was instrumental in calls for constitutional reform which led to the New Jersey Constitution of 1844. In both terms, he promoted educational reform and prison reform, a cause he continued to champion in retirement.

== Early life ==
Daniel Haines was born on January 6, 1801, in New York City to Elias and Mary (née Ogden) Haines. He was the eldest of seven children.

Elias Haines was a well-known and successful merchant in New York City, and his father Stephen Haines had been a distinguished patriot in the American Revolution. Their earliest ancestors had settled at Salem, Massachusetts in 1637 before moving to Southold, New York. The Haineses were among the first settlers of Elizabethtown, New Jersey. Mary Ogden was the daughter of Robert Ogden III and the niece of Aaron Ogden, who would serve as governor of New Jersey in 1812 and 1813.

Daniel Haines was educated privately in New York before attending a preparatory school in Elizabethtown. He graduated from The College of New Jersey (now Princeton University) in 1820. After graduation, Haines entered the law office of his uncle, Thomas C. Ryerson, in Newton. He was admitted to the bar in 1823 and began his own practice in Hamburg.

== Early political career ==
Haines began his political life as a member of the Federalist Party, but supported Andrew Jackson in the 1824 presidential election, as did most of his neighbors in Sussex County. As a leading resident of small Vernon Township, Haines secured every single vote in the township for Jackson.

Haines continued his private legal practice for fifteen more years before entering public office in 1838, when he was elected to represent Sussex County in the New Jersey Legislative Council by a large majority. Upon his inauguration, he immediately became involved in the Broad Seal War, a bitter partisan controversy over the 1838 elections to the United States Congress. When the House of Representatives seated the Democratic ticket over the Whig claimants, Whig legislators from Morris and Essex counties introduced resolutions denouncing the action; Haines led the Democratic caucus in the ensuing debate. Though the resolutions passed, Haines's leadership role elevated his status within his party and the state.

== Governor of New Jersey ==
=== 1843 election ===
In 1843, the Democratic Party won control of the Legislative Council. At the time, the governor of New Jersey was the presiding officer of the council and elected by its members; the governor jointly served as Chancellor. On October 27, 1843, Haines was nominated as the Democratic candidate in a meeting of the legislative caucus, ensuring his election.

=== First term (1843–45) ===
During his first term as governor, Haines led efforts for constitutional reform consistent with a belated transition to Jacksonian democracy. In his own words, Haines argued that the state constitution had "provisions which are at least inexpedient if not wholly incompatible with the spirit of the present age." Two of his chief concerns were dividing the offices of governor and chancellor and the election of the governor by popular vote, rather than legislative majority. To smooth partisan concerns over reform, Haines called for a bipartisan convention on the argument that the constitution was "a measure which is too momentous to be made the subject of party difference." The new Constitution was ratified in 1844.

In addition to constitutional reform, Haines placed emphasis on educational and military policy. He called on the legislature to revise the common school law, under which local authorities avoided their delegated responsibility to visit and examine their schools and report to the state. Haines suggested that the Council and State Assembly "inquire into the expediency of appointing a general superintendent," and the office was introduced in 1844.

In his second annual message, Haines turned his focus to the state militia, which he announced "seems to have fallen in great disrepute" after insufficient record-keeping led to an annual loss of federal military supplies. Haines additionally complained that troops were poorly disciplined, and that "the ordinary militia musters... are generally admitted to retard rather than to promoted improvement; and to be a tax upon the time and service of the citizen without any corresponding benefit."

Haines peremptorily declined to be nominated for governor in the 1844 election, the first under the new Constitution he had championed. It was won narrowly by Charles C. Stratton, a Whig; Haines left office on January 21, 1845.

=== 1847 election ===
On September 22, 1847, the Democratic state convention nominated Haines for governor on the first ballot.

In the November election, he defeated William Wright, a former mayor of Newark and U.S. Representative, despite the fact that the Whigs won the legislative elections. He was sworn into office for a three-year term.

=== Second term (1848–1851) ===
In his second term, Haines continued his crusade for educational reform. He called on the legislature to make education its main priority, as "not many more than one half of the children in the state receive instruction in the schools [and]... a very large proportion must be growing up in ignorance." To improve the quality of public education, Haines called for a state normal school to educate teachers, the introduction of free public education, and an increase in revenues apportioned to state and local schools.

Haines also took an interest in prison reform during his second term in office. He claimed that the prisons were "schools for vice, whose youngest pupils may become the ripest scholars and most finished rogues." He decried the common housing of "the hardened villain and the juvenile delinquent" in the same cells and called for the establishment of workshops in county prisons, separation of older and younger prisoners, and the construction of a reform school for juveniles.

== New Jersey Supreme Court ==
After his second term ended in 1851, Haines returned to the private practice of law in Hamburg for one year, taking on prominent cases of national importance. In one case involving Charles Goodyear's right to vulcanize Indian rubber, his co-counsel was Daniel Webster.

In 1852, Governor George Franklin Fort appointed Haines to a seven-year term on the New Jersey Supreme Court. He was sworn in after Senate confirmation in November. He was reappointed in 1859 by William A. Newell and retired from the bench in 1866.

As a jurist responsible for the Newark circuit, Haines won the praise of fellow justice Lucius Elmer, who said "few judges were ever freer from the influence of passion or prejudice."

== Later political activities ==
During and after his judicial service, Haines remained an active member of the Democratic Party.

In 1860, Haines supported Stephen A. Douglas for president over Abraham Lincoln, whose election he feared "might precipitate war." He continued to oppose calls for war until the Battle of Fort Sumter, when he became an active supporter of the Union cause and assisted in efforts to raise troops. He supported George B. McClellan against Lincoln in 1864, feeling that "the measures of the administration tend to protract the war." After leaving the bench, Haines supported Horatio Seymour in 1868 because he was "steadily opposed to most of the measures of reconstruction adopted by the Republican Party."

After leaving the bench, Haines remained an activist for prison reform until his death. In 1868, the legislature appointed Haines to lead a study on prison systems in New Jersey and other states. In 1870, Governor Theodore F. Randolph appointed him a delegate to the National Congress on Penitentiary and Reformatory Discipline, which in turn named him to a committee to organize a national reform association and serve as a delegate to the International Convention of Prison Discipline and Reform in London in 1872. In 1872, he also served as vice president of the National Prison Association.

== Personal life and death ==
Haines married his first wife, Ann Maria Austin of Warwick, New York on June 28, 1827. They had three daughters and two sons. Their son, Thomas Ryerson Haines, died at the Battle of Harrisonburg during the Civil War. Anna Maria died on December 8, 1844.

Haines remarried to Mary Townsend of Newark on July 6, 1865.

Haines was a ruling elder of the Presbyterian Church, President of the Sussex County Bible Society, and a member of the committee to reunify the Church after the Civil War.

Haines died at his home in Hamburg, New Jersey on January 26, 1877, and was buried at North Hardyston Cemetery in Hardyston Township, New Jersey.

== See also ==
- List of governors of New Jersey

Political offices
Preceded by William Pennington	Governor of New Jersey; October 27, 1843 – January 21, 1845	Succeeded by Charles C. Stratton
Preceded by Charles C. Stratton	Governor of New Jersey; January 18, 1848 – January 20, 1851	Succeeded by George Franklin Fort
Preceded by Joseph Fitz Randolph	Justice of the Supreme Court of New Jersey; 1852 – 1866	Succeeded by David A. Depue
Party political offices
Preceded by John Renshaw Thomson	Democratic Nominee for Governor of New Jersey; 1847	Succeeded by George F. Fort
