= Charles C. Stratton =

American politician

Charles Creighton Stratton
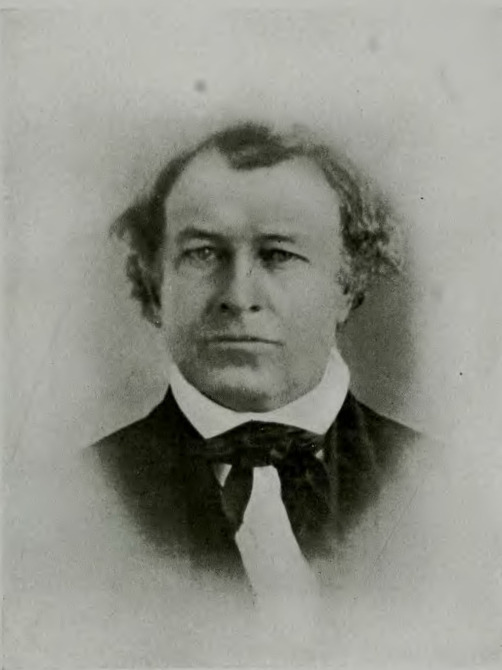

15th Governor of New Jersey
- In office January 21, 1845 – January 18, 1848
- Preceded by: Daniel Haines
- Succeeded by: Daniel Haines

Member of the U.S. House of Representatives from New Jersey's at-large congressional district
- In office March 4, 1841 – March 3, 1843
- Preceded by: Daniel B. Ryall
- Succeeded by: District eliminated
- In office March 4, 1837 – March 3, 1839
- Preceded by: Ferdinand S. Schenck
- Succeeded by: Daniel B. Ryall

Member of the New Jersey General Assembly
- In office 1821; 1823; 1829

Personal details
- Born: March 6, 1796 Swedesboro, New Jersey, US
- Died: March 30, 1859 (aged 63) Swedesboro, New Jersey, US
- Party: Whig
- Spouse: Sarah Taggart
- Education: Rutgers College

Charles Creighton Stratton (March 6, 1796 – March 30, 1859) was an American farmer and politician who served as the 15th governor of New Jersey from 1845 to 1848. He was the first popularly elected governor following the adoption of the 1844 New Jersey Constitution.

He also served in the New Jersey legislature during the 1820s and represented New Jersey in the United States House of Representatives from 1837 to 1839 and 1841 to 1843. Between his House terms, he became embroiled in the Broad Seal War, a legal contest over the results of the 1838 New Jersey elections.

== Biography ==
Charles Creighton Stratton was born on March 6, 1796, in Swedesboro, New Jersey.

He graduated from Rutgers College in 1814, and engaged in agricultural pursuits. He was a member of the New Jersey General Assembly in 1821, 1823, and again in 1829. He was elected as a Whig to the Twenty-fifth United States Congress (1837–1839); presented credentials as a member-elect to the Twenty-sixth Congress, but the House declined to seat him; reelected to the Twenty-seventh United States Congress (1841–1843). He chose not to run again in 1842.

Stratton served as a member of the 1844 constitutional convention that created a revised New Jersey State Constitution. The new 1844 New Jersey State Constitution provided for direct election of a governor for a single three-year term. Stratton ran on the Whig ticket, and campaigned on a platform opposing the powerful railroad interests of the state. The Democratic candidate was Pennsylvania-born John R. Thomson, who was a stockholder in the railroad and a vigorous advocate of internal improvements.

Stratton won, and served as governor from January 21, 1845, to January 17, 1848. After his term he resumed agricultural pursuits.

== Personal life ==
He married Sarah Taggart of Philadelphia in 1854.

Although he had no children, Stratton had two notable nephews:

- Benjamin Franklin Howey, a Republican member of the Forty-eighth United States Congress (1883–1885) from the 4th Congressional District
- Thomas Preston Carpenter, an Associate Justice on the New Jersey Supreme Court

== Death and legacy ==
Because of ill health, he resided in Europe in 1857 and 1858. He died on March 30, 1859, in Swedesboro. He is interred at Trinity Church Cemetery in Swedesboro.

His home in Woolwich Township, New Jersey, the Gov. Charles C. Stratton House, was built in 1791 and added to the National Register of Historic Places on January 29, 1973.

Party political offices
Preceded by First	Whig Nominee for Governor of New Jersey; 1844	Succeeded by William Wright
U.S. House of Representatives
Preceded by Philemon Dickerson, Samuel Fowler, Thomas Lee, James Parker, Ferdinand Schureman Schenck, William Norton Shinn, and William Chetwood on a General ticket	Member of the U.S. House of Representatives from New Jersey's at-large congressional district alongside John Bancker Aycrigg, William Halstead, John Patterson Bryan Maxwell, Joseph Fitz Randolph, and Thomas Jones Yorke on a General ticket March 4, 1837 – March 3, 1839	Succeeded by Joseph Fitz Randolph, William Raworth Cooper, Philemon Dickerson, Joseph Kille, Daniel Bailey Ryall, and Peter Dumont Vroom on a General ticket
Preceded by Joseph Fitz Randolph, William Raworth Cooper, Philemon Dickerson, Joseph Kille, Daniel Bailey Ryall, and Peter Dumont Vroom on a General ticket	Member of the U.S. House of Representatives from New Jersey's at-large congressional district alongside John Bancker Aycrigg, William Halstead, John Patterson Bryan Maxwell, Joseph Fitz Randolph, and Thomas Jones Yorke on a General ticket March 4, 1841 – March 3, 1843	Succeeded by Lucius Q.C. Elmer, George Sykes, Isaac G. Farlee, Littleton Kirkpatrick, William Wright in separate districts
Political offices
Preceded by Daniel Haines	Governor of New Jersey; January 21, 1845 – January 18, 1848	Succeeded by Daniel Haines
