= Samuel G. Wright =

American politician

Samuel Wright

Member of the U.S. House of Representatives from New Jersey's 2nd district
- In office March 4, 1845 – July 30, 1845
- Preceded by: George Sykes
- Succeeded by: George Sykes

Personal details
- Born: Samuel Gardiner Wright; November 18, 1781 Wrightstown, New Jersey, U.S.
- Died: July 30, 1845 (aged 63) Imlaystown, New Jersey, U.S.
- Party: Whig Party
- Relations: George Franklin Fort (son-in-law)
- Children: 1

Samuel Gardiner Wright (November 18, 1781 – July 30, 1845) was an American politician who served as a member of the United States House of Representatives for New Jersey's 2nd congressional district from March to July of 1845.

== Early life ==
Wright was born in Wrightstown, New Jersey.

== Career ==
In 1830, Wright was elected to the New Jersey Legislative Council representing Monmouth County. He was elected as a Whig to the Twenty-ninth United States Congress to represent New Jersey's 2nd congressional district and served from March 4, 1845 until July of the same year.

== Personal life ==
Wright died near Imlaystown, New Jersey. He is buried in the East Branch Cemetery, near Imlaystown. Wright's daughter, Anna Marie Wright, married George Franklin Fort in 1830. Fort was elected governor of New Jersey in 1851.

== See also ==
- List of members of the United States Congress who died in office (1790–1899)

U.S. House of Representatives
Preceded by George Sykes	Member of the U.S. House of Representatives from New Jersey's 2nd congressional district 1845	Succeeded by George Sykes
