= George Franklin Fort =

American politician

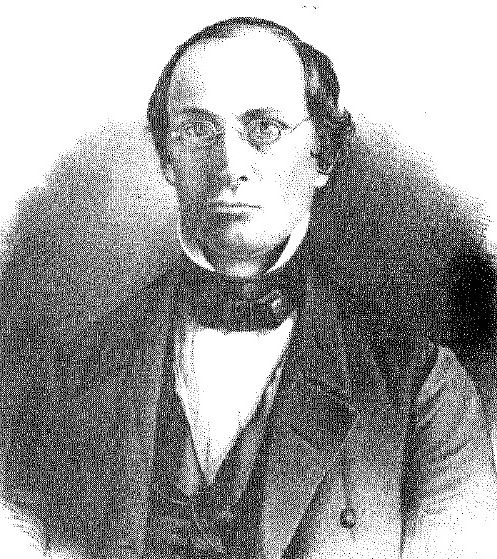

16th Governor of New Jersey
- In office January 21, 1851 – January 17, 1854
- Preceded by: Daniel Haines
- Succeeded by: Rodman M. Price

Member of the New Jersey Senate from Monmouth County
- In office 1846–1848
- Preceded by: Thomas E. Combs
- Succeeded by: John A. Morford

Member of the New Jersey General Assembly
- In office 1844

Personal details
- Born: June 30, 1809 Pemberton, New Jersey, US
- Died: April 22, 1872 (aged 62) New Egypt, New Jersey, US
- Party: Democratic
- Spouse: Anna Marie Bodine
- Education: University of Pennsylvania School of Medicine
- Profession: Physician

George Franklin Fort (June 30, 1809 – April 22, 1872) was a medical doctor, judge, and Democratic Party politician who served as the 16th Governor of New Jersey from 1851 to 1854.

== Early life ==
George Franklin Fort was born on June 30, 1809, near Pemberton, New Jersey. His father, Andrew Fort, was a wealthy farmer in New Hanover Township.

After attending the Pemberton common schools, Fort graduated from the University of Pennsylvania School of Medicine in 1828. He studied medicine in the office of Dr. Jacob Eghert in Pemberton and Dr. Charles Patterson in New Egypt. In 1830, he was married and opened his own practice in Imlaystown before returning to New Egypt and establishing a medical practice throughout Monmouth and Burlington counties, including the part of Monmouth that became Ocean County in 1850.

== Early political career ==
=== 1844 constitutional convention ===
Fort began his public career in 1844, when he was elected to the state constitutional convention as a Democratic delegate from Monmouth County. Monmouth, which was then a thoroughly Democratic county, was also the only county which refused to send a bipartisan ticket. The move resulted in Democratic control of the convention. During the proceedings, Fort supported universal suffrage, open eligibility for office, abolition of the freehold qualification for public office, and popular election of all state and county officials.

=== State legislator (1845–1848) ===
In the state elections of the same year, Fort was elected to the New Jersey General Assembly, running well ahead of his ticket. During his one-year term, he served on the Assembly committee on the judiciary.

In 1845, Fort was elevated to represent Monmouth in the Senate. He served again on the judiciary committee. He also served on committees for education and the investigation of the Plainfield Bank, and as one of three commissioners to value the riparian lands at Jersey City. In the Senate, Fort developed a reputation as a reformer by sponsoring a bill to ensure township support for public education and the Manufacturing Incorporation Law, which eliminated private acts of incorporation for specific industries.

His term in office ended in 1848.

== Governor of New Jersey ==
=== 1850 election ===
In 1850, the influential Monmouth County Democrat newspaper advanced Fort's name as a contender for the Democratic nomination for Governor two months before the state convention. He won the nomination on the fifth ballot over John Summerill of Salem County, John Cassedy of Hudson County, and Henry A. Ford of Morris County.

Fort's opponent in the general election was Whig Party nominee John Runk, a former U.S. Representative from Hunterdon County. The Whig campaign focused on alleged corruption by the United New Jersey Railroad and Canal Company (known as the "Joint Companies"), a transportation conglomerate formed by the 1831 merger of the Camden & Amboy Railroad and Delaware and Raritan Canal Company. The Joint Companies exercised tremendous economic leverage and dominated state politics at the time, primarily through the Democratic Party. Some outsiders derisively referred to New Jersey as "the State of Camden and Amboy." Robert F. Stockton, the president and majority owner of the Joint Companies, was a member of the Democratic Party, and its first nominee had been Stockton's brother-in-law, John Renshaw Thomson. Stockton now backed Fort for Governor, partly out of his own ambition to be elected to the United States Senate in 1851. Fort's father-in-law, Samuel G. Wright, was also an underwriter commissioned to sell shares in the new company in 1831. To counter the issue, Fort's supporters cited his support of the general incorporation law, thought to remove political considerations from corporate power.

The Whig Party was also divided over the Compromise of 1850 and the Fugitive Slave Act. Both of the state's Whig United States Senators had voted against the Compromise of 1850, and the Democratic press accused the Whigs of "seeking to make the State of New Jersey an Abolition State." Fort openly favored the Fugitive Slave Act as binding because it was "in accordance with the evident intentment of the constitutional compact" and would, in his view, ensure peace, stability, and the preservation of the Union. Many pro-Compromise Whigs abstained from the campaign altogether; others sought to place the emphasis on other issues, like protective tariffs. The previous Whig nominee for Governor, William Wright, switched parties entirely.

The result was a large victory for Fort and the largest percentage of the popular vote in any of the six pre-Civil War elections in the state. His victory ensured the Democratic Party's growing dominance in the state for the next six years, as the Whig Party declined.

=== Term in office (1851–1854) ===
During the Fort administration, expenditures for public schools were increased substantially, drawn from dividends paid on state-owned Joint Companies stock. Laws were passed establishing the ten-hour work day and protecting child labor. General incorporation laws were extended to banks, insurance companies, and plank roads, but crucially not to railroads; the Joint Companies continued to dominate politics.

Fort also secured a bill for the regulation of banks consistent with the "hard money" platform of the Democratic Party. The legislature also passed a homestaed exemption act, protecting family homesteads from sale for debts of less than $1,000.

During his term in office, the system of Assembly elections was amended to replace countywide elections with district apportionment.

== Personal life and legacy ==
In 1830, Fort married Anna Marie Wright in Imlaystown. They had four children. Anna was the daughter of Samuel G. Wright, an iron manufacturer who represented Monmouth County in the New Jersey Legislative Council at the time; Wright was elected to a term in the United States House of Representatives as a Whig but served only four months before his death in 1845.

Fort's nephew, John Franklin Fort, also served as Governor of New Jersey from 1908 to 1911. Unlike his uncle, John F. Fort was a Republican.

== Later life and death ==
At the expiration of his term in office, incoming Governor Rodman M. Price appointed Fort to the Court of Errors and Appeals.

After leaving the bench, Fort resumed the practice of medicine in New Egypt. He served as a trustee of Bordentown Female College and Zoar Methodist Episcopal Church in New Egypt. Fort spent the final years of his life writing a laudatory history of Freemasonry in the United States, which was published three years after his death.

Fort died on April 22, 1872, at his home in the New Egypt section of Plumsted Township. He was buried in the United Methodist Church Cemetery in Pemberton.

== Publications ==
- Early History of Antiquities of Freemasonry (1875)
- A Historical Treatise on Early Builders' Marks'

Political offices
Preceded by Daniel Haines	Governor of New Jersey; January 21, 1851 – January 17, 1854	Succeeded by Rodman M. Price
Party political offices
Preceded by Daniel Haines	Democratic Nominee for Governor of New Jersey; 1850	Succeeded by Rodman M. Price
