= 1844 New Jersey gubernatorial election =

- October 8, 1844
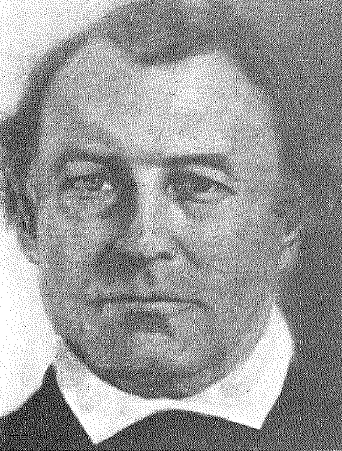

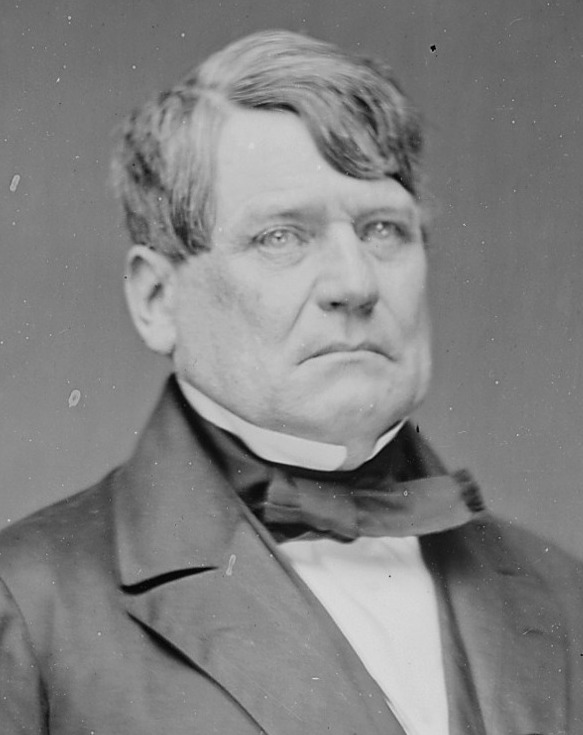
Nominee	Charles C. Stratton	John Renshaw Thomson
Party	Whig	Democratic
Popular vote	37,985	36,581
Percentage	50.94%	49.06%
- Stratton: 50–60% 60–70% 70–80% Thomson: 50–60% 60–70% 70–80%
Governor before election
Daniel Haines
Democratic
Elected Governor
Charles C. Stratton
Whig

The 1844 New Jersey gubernatorial election was held on October 8, 1844. Whig nominee Charles C. Stratton defeated Democratic nominee John Renshaw Thomson with 50.94% of the vote.

== Background ==
This was the first election held under the New Jersey Constitution of 1844, which was adopted on June 29 and reformed the state government, notably establishing an independent executive branch. Before 1844, New Jersey Governors were elected by a majority of the New Jersey Legislative Council and held office as a member of that body. Although the new constitution formally lifted the constitutional property requirement for suffrage, it added race and sex requirements; only white males over the age of 21 were eligible to vote in this election.

== General election ==
=== Candidates ===
- Charles C. Stratton, former U.S. Representative from Swedesboro (Whig)
- John Renshaw Thomson, businessman and delegate to the 1844 Constitutional Convention from Princeton (Democratic)

=== Results ===
1844 New Jersey gubernatorial election
Party	Candidate	Votes	%
Whig	Charles C. Stratton	37,985	50.94%
Democratic	John Renshaw Thomson	36,581	49.06%
Total votes		74,566	100.00%
Majority		1,404	1.88%
Turnout		74,566	
Whig gain from Democratic			

=== Results by county ===
County	Stratton		Thomson		Total	Margin	
County	Votes	Percent	Votes	Percent	Votes	Votes	Percent
Atlantic	426	36.07%	755	63.93%	1,181	-329	-27.86%
Bergen	774	36.08%	1,371	63.92%	2,145	-597	-27.84%
Burlington	3,675	55.25%	2,977	44.75%	6,652	698	9.50%
Camden	1,502	57.15%	1,126	42.85%	2,628	376	14.30%
Cape May	750	72.46%	285	27.54%	1,035	465	44.92%
Cumberland	1,567	53.96%	1,337	46.04%	2,904	230	7.92%
Essex	5,385	59.86%	3,611	40.14%	8,996	1,774	19.72%
Gloucester	1,484	64.66%	811	35.34%	2,295	673	29.32%
Hudson	1,102	63.37%	637	36.63%	1,739	465	26.74%
Hunterdon	2,545	43.91%	3,251	56.09%	5,796	-706	-12.18%
Mercer	1,830	53.46%	1,593	46.54%	3,423	237	6.92%
Middlesex	2,320	54.18%	1,962	45.82%	4,282	358	8.36%
Monmouth	3,209	47.61%	3,531	52.39%	6,740	-322	-4.78%
Morris	2,832	53.01%	2,510	46.99%	5,342	322	6.02%
Passaic	1,534	56.21%	1,195	43.79%	2,729	339	12.42%
Salem	1,791	54.40%	1,501	45.60%	3,292	290	8.80%
Somerset	2,145	53.34%	1,927	46.66%	218	2,671	6.68%
Sussex	1,274	27.14%	3,421	72.86%	4,695	-2,147	-45.72%
Warren	1,640	37.10%	2,780	62.90%	4,420	-1,140	-25.80%
Total	37,985	50.94%	36,581	49.06%	74,566	1,404	1.88%

=== State Legislative Results ===
The Whigs were able to flip both houses of the state legislature, giving Stratton a trifecta that lasted his entire term. In the General Assembly, Whigs were able to win 40 seats to the Democrats 18, a gain of 17 seats in the lower hose. Meanwhile, in the Senate, Whigs won 13 seats to the Democrats 6, a gain of 7.
