= Cold Spring Presbyterian Church =

Historic church in Cape May County, New Jersey, US

- U.S. National Register of Historic Places
- New Jersey Register of Historic Places
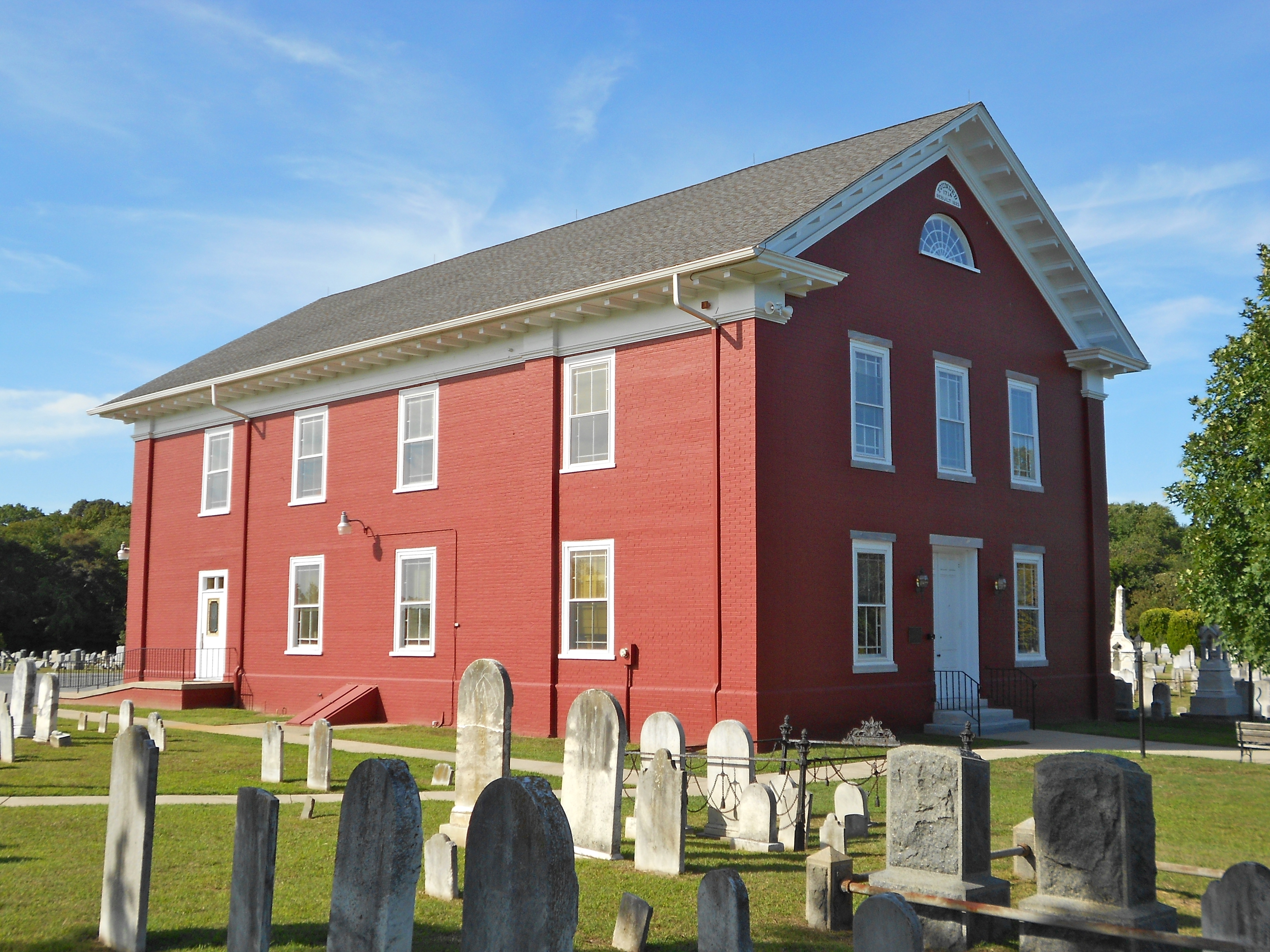

- Location within Cape May County, New Jersey Location within New Jersey Location within the United States
- Location: 780 Seashore Road; Cold Spring, New Jersey
- Coordinates: 38°58′35.26″N 74°54′59.11″W
- Built: 1823
- Architect: Thomas Hurst Hughes
- Architectural style: Federal
- NRHP reference No.: 91000785
- NJRHP No.: 999

Significant dates
- Added to NRHP: June 14, 1991
- Designated NJRHP: May 1, 1991

The Cold Spring Presbyterian Church is a Presbyterian church in Cold Spring, New Jersey, founded in 1714.

== Building ==
The historic two-story red brick building located at 780 Seashore Road in the Cold Spring section of Lower Township, in Cape May County, New Jersey. The current church building, known as "Old Brick", was constructed in 1823 by Thomas H. Hughes, who was also the architect of Congress Hall in Cape May, New Jersey. This red brick building replaced a frame and shingle church erected in 1764, which itself replaced a 1714 log meetinghouse. The church's cemetery, Cold Spring Presbyterian Cemetery, is the site of a 1742 grave (that of Sarah Eldridge Spicer) and of the most Mayflower descendants anywhere outside Massachusetts. The church was added to the National Register of Historic Places on June 14, 1991, for its significance in settlement, architecture, religion, and government.

== History ==
The congregation was founded in 1714. The first regular pastor was John Bradner, who served from 1715 until 1721. Hughston Hughes was pastor for one year, starting in 1726, before being dismissed for "his too free use of intoxicating drinks."

Samuel Finley was pastor for several years. Finley, who was a graduate of the Log College, later became president of the College of New Jersey, the predecessor of Princeton University. Another Log College graduate, Daniel Lawrence, was pastor from 1752 until his death in 1766. His tombstone in the adjacent graveyard was inscribed

In yonder sacred house I spent my breath,
Now, silent, mouldering here I lie in death,
Those silent lips shall wake and yet declare,
A dread amen to truths they publish there

The two hundredth anniversary of the church was celebrated on August 16, 1914. President Woodrow Wilson sent a congratulatory letter.

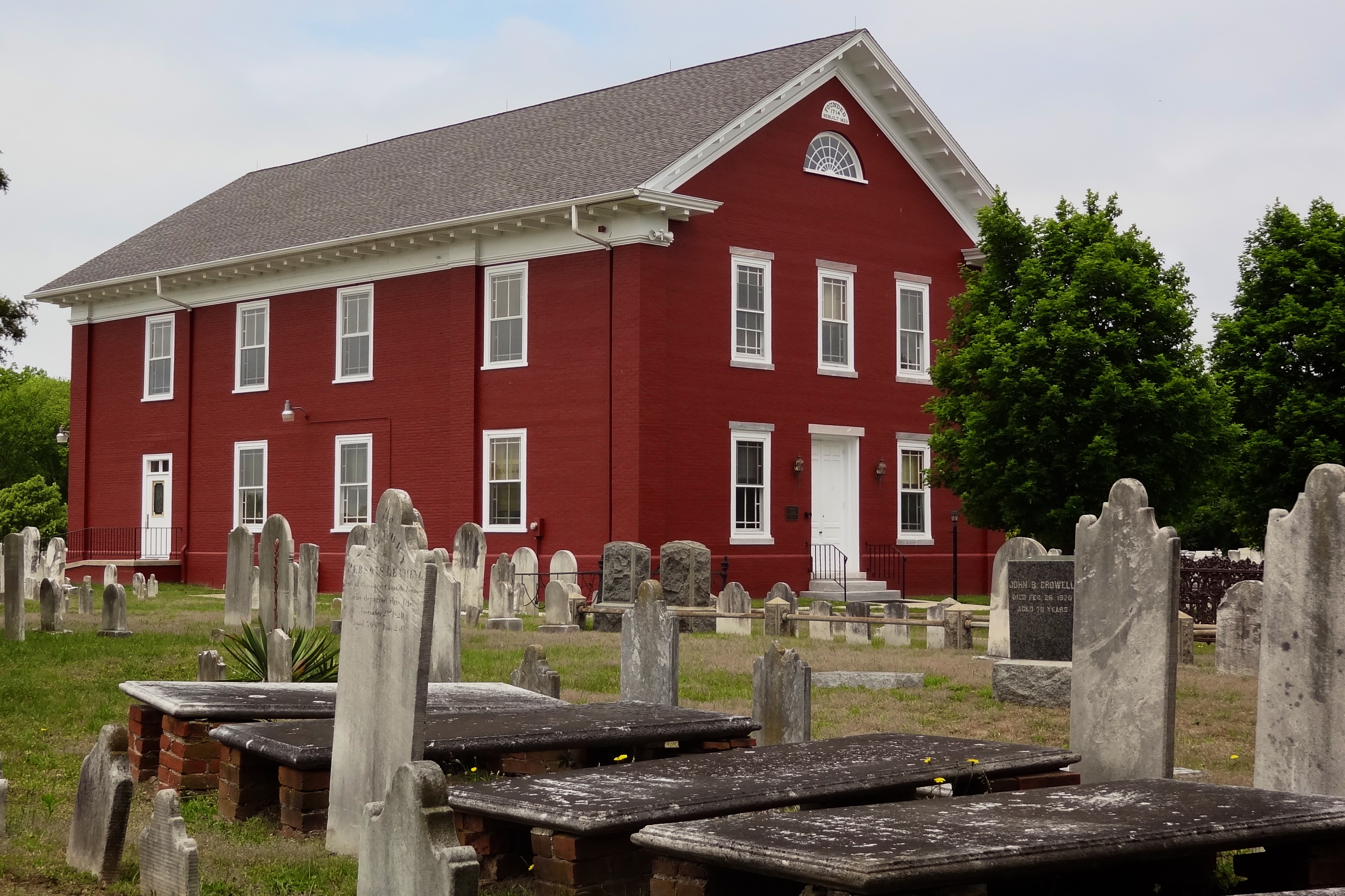
Church and Cemetery

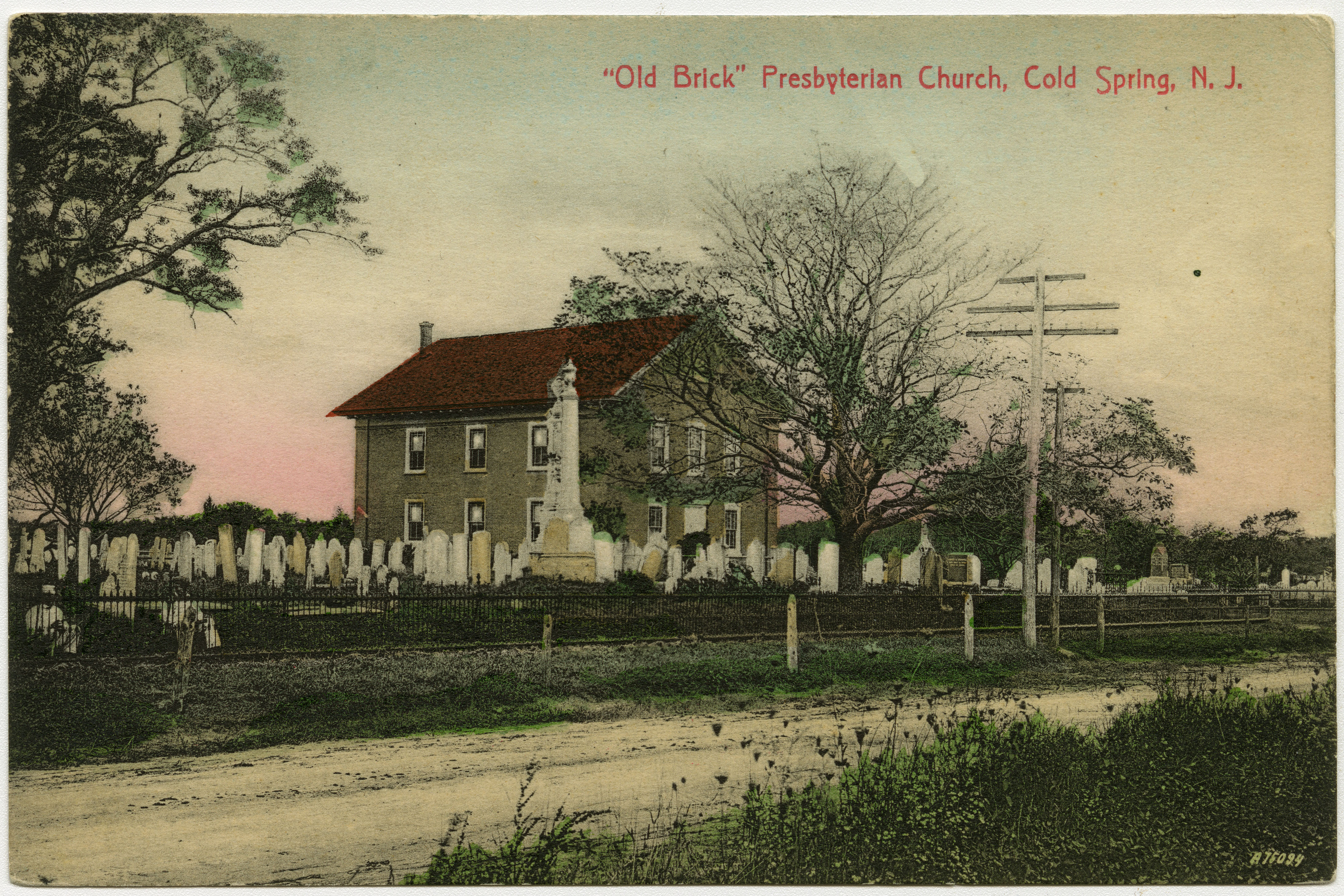
On a pre-1923 postcard

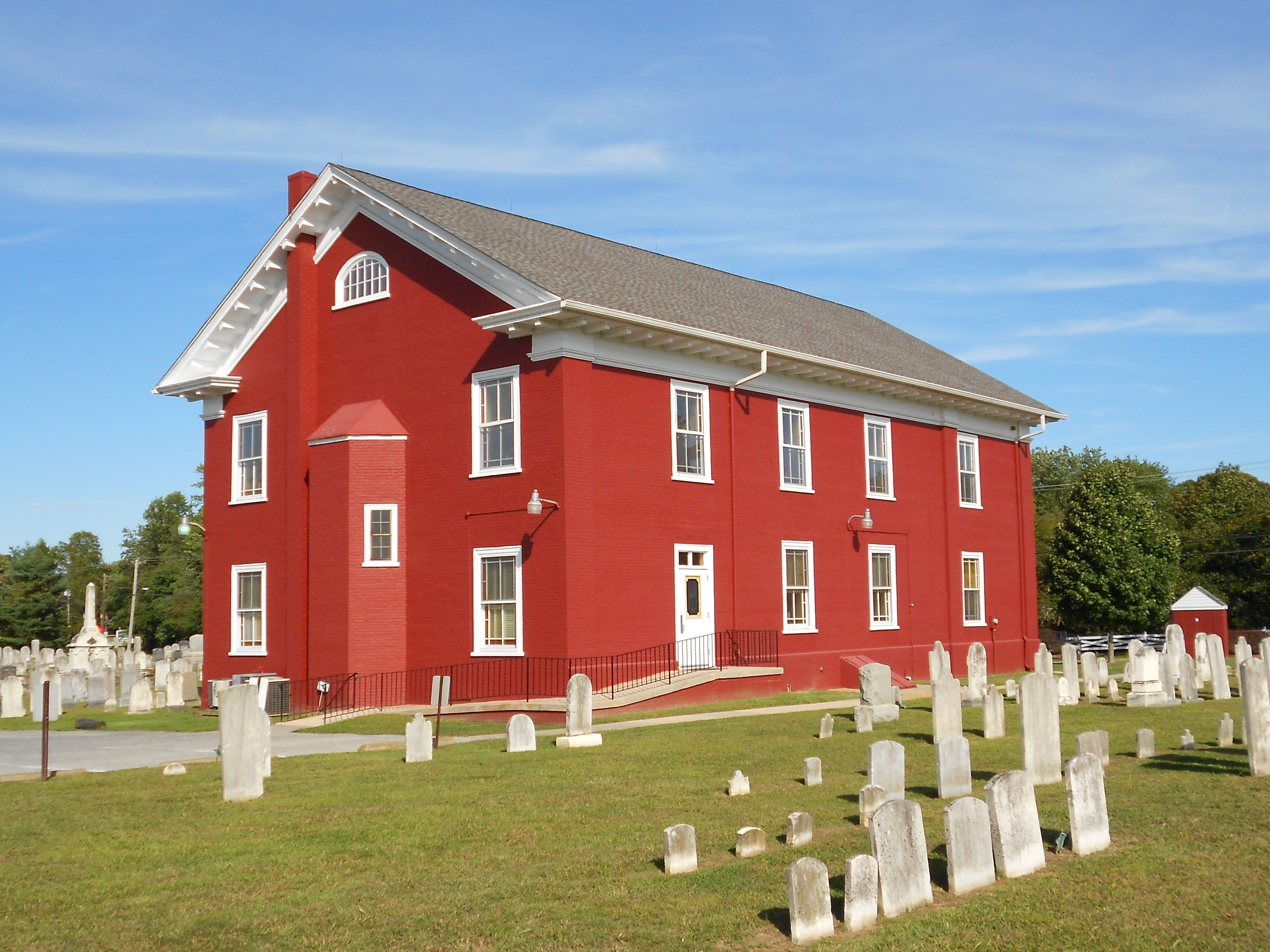
View from the southwest. Note that the rear section was added since the postcard picture

== Notable burials ==
Cold Spring Presbyterian Cemetery
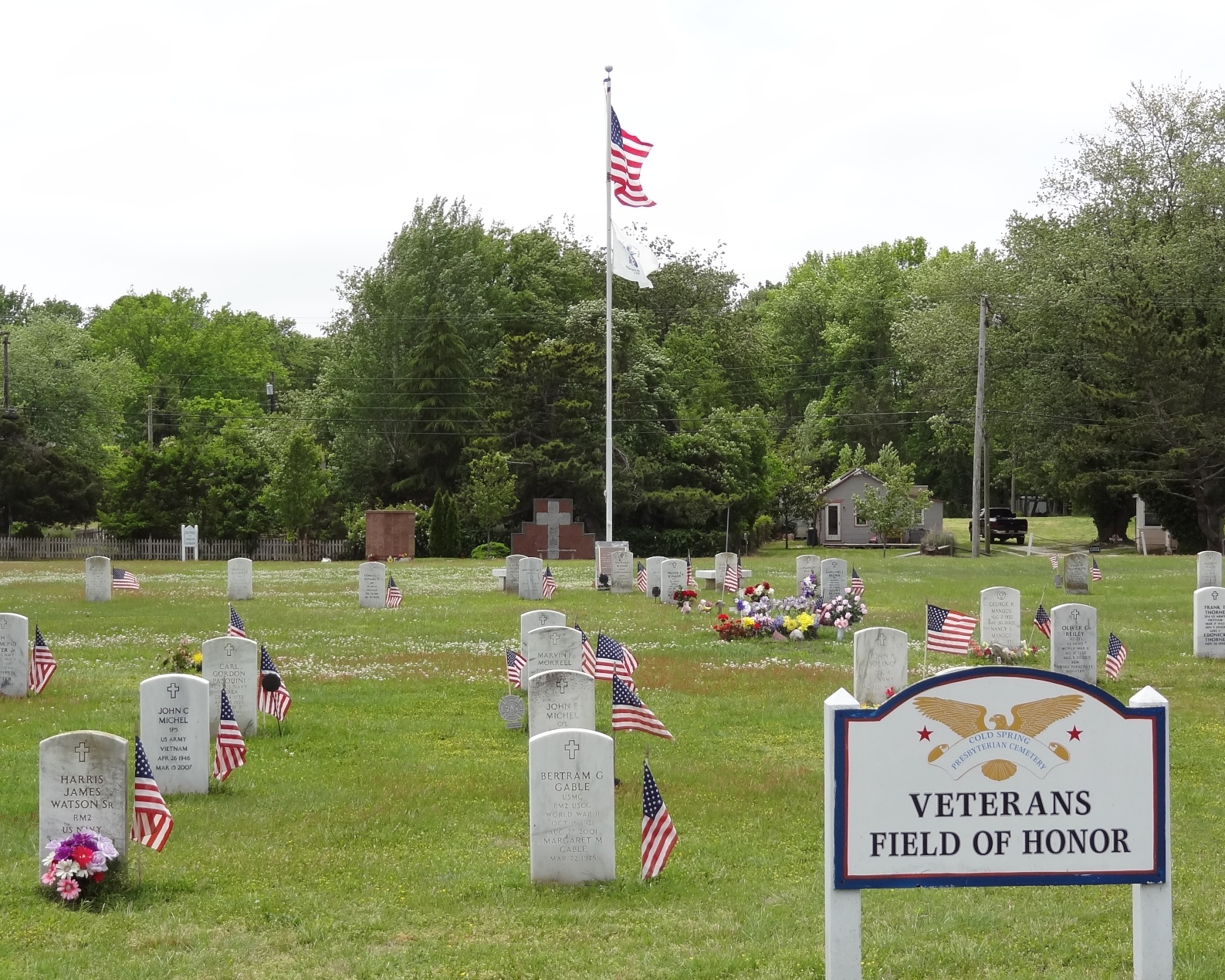
- Veterans Field of Honor at the cemetery
- Interactive map of Cold Spring Presbyterian Cemetery

Details
- Find a Grave: Cold Spring Presbyterian Cemetery

- T. Millet Hand (1902–1956), represented New Jersey's 2nd congressional district in the United States House of Representatives from 1945 to 1957.
- J. Thompson Baker (1847–1919), represented New Jersey's 2nd congressional district in the United States House of Representatives from 1913 to 1915.
- Thomas H. Hughes (1769–1839), represented New Jersey's at-large congressional district in the United States House of Representatives from 1829 to 1833.
- Charles W. Sandman Jr. (1921–1985), represented New Jersey's 2nd congressional district in the United States House of Representatives from 1913 to 1915.
- Lieutenant Richard Wickes (died June 29, 1776) American Revolutionary War, mortally wounded at the Battle of Turtle Gut Inlet.
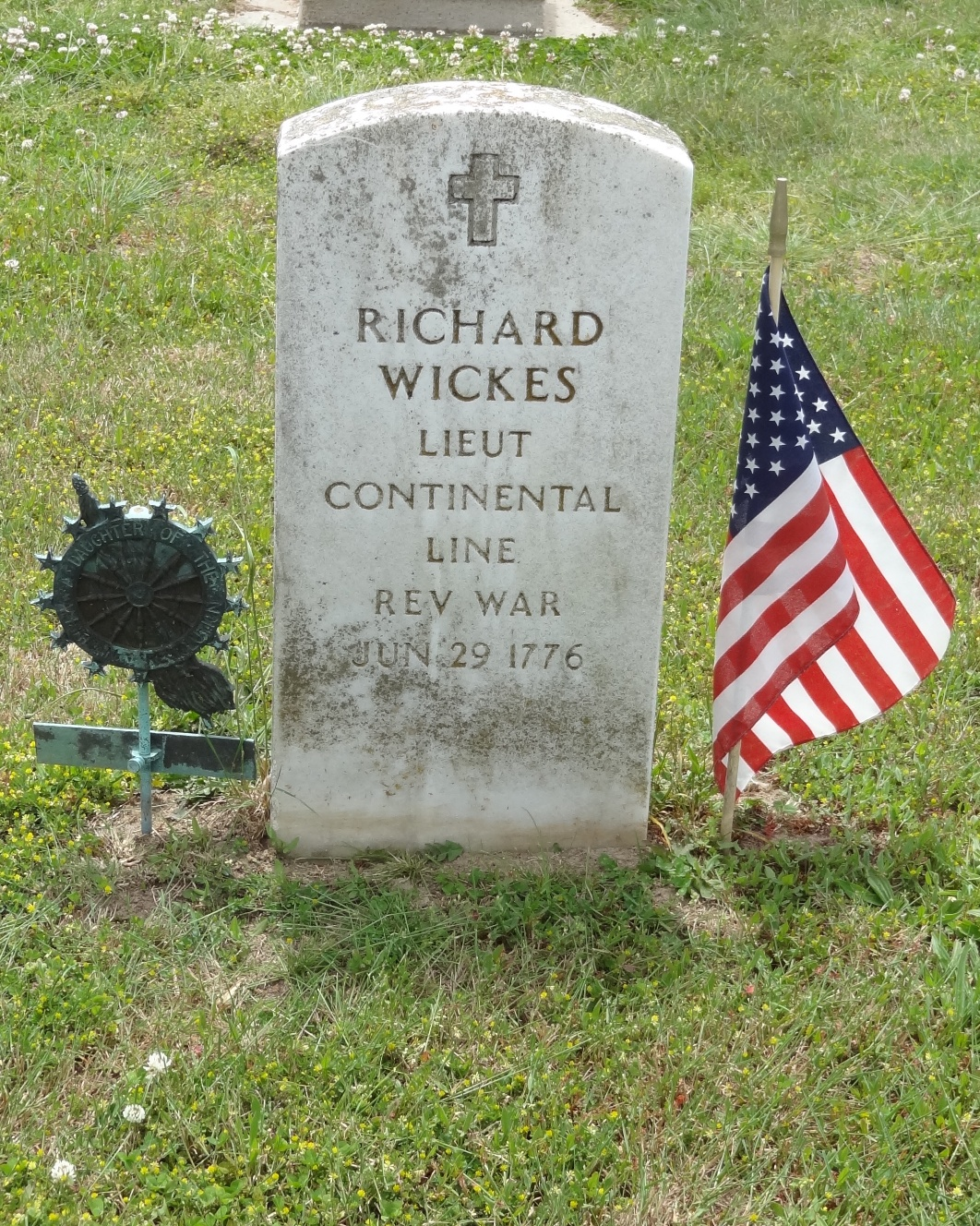
Richard Wickes

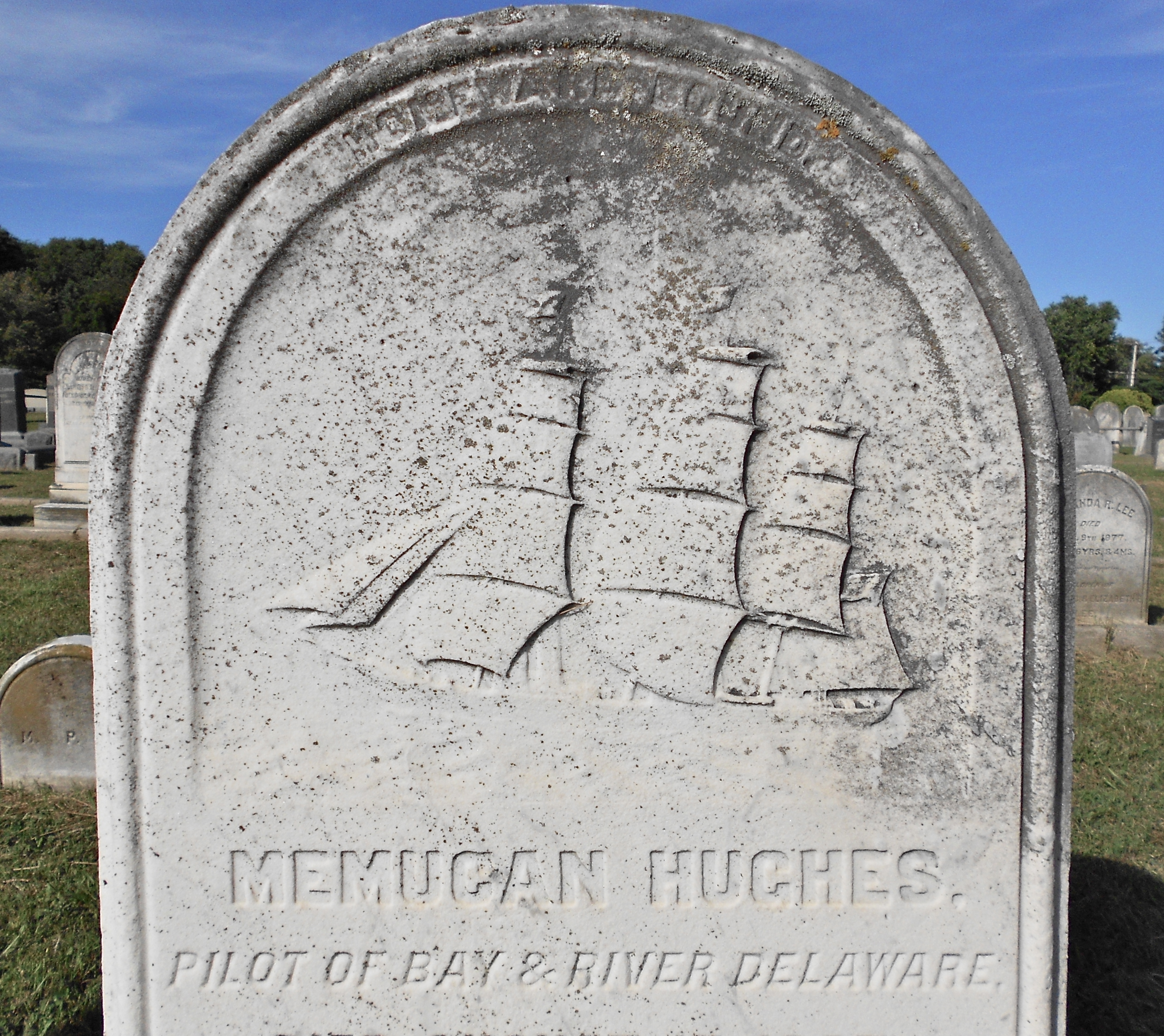
Memucan Hughes, II (1857)

== See also ==
- National Register of Historic Places listings in Cape May County, New Jersey
