= Ebenezer Tucker =

American politician

Ebenezer Tucker (November 15, 1758 – September 5, 1845) was in the United States House of Representatives from New Jersey where he was elected to both the Nineteenth and the Twentieth United States Congress. He was in Congress from March 4, 1825, to March 3, 1829.

Tucker served in the American Revolutionary War under General George Washington at the Battle of Long Island and other engagements. He was a judge of the Court of Common Pleas, justice of Court Of Quarter Sessions and judge of the Orphans Court of Burlington County from 1820 to 1825. He moved to what is now Tuckerton, New Jersey, which was named after him, where he engaged in business and shipbuilding. He was the postmaster of Tuckerton from 1806 to 1825, when he resigned to take up his duties in Congress. After Congress, he was again the postmaster of Tuckerton from 1831 until his death in there in 1845. His grave is marked by a most prominent obelisk.

Tucker was the first collector of revenue of the port of Tuckerton. Tuckerton became the third port of entry of the United States, after New York City and Philadelphia, Pennsylvania. Tucker's commission as collector bears the date March 21, 1791, and was signed by George Washington, President, and Thomas Jefferson, Secretary of State.

U.S. House of Representatives
Preceded by James Matlack	Member of the U.S. House of Representatives from New Jersey's at-large congressional district 1825–1829	Succeeded by Thomas H. Hughes
