= Thomas Preston Carpenter =

American judge

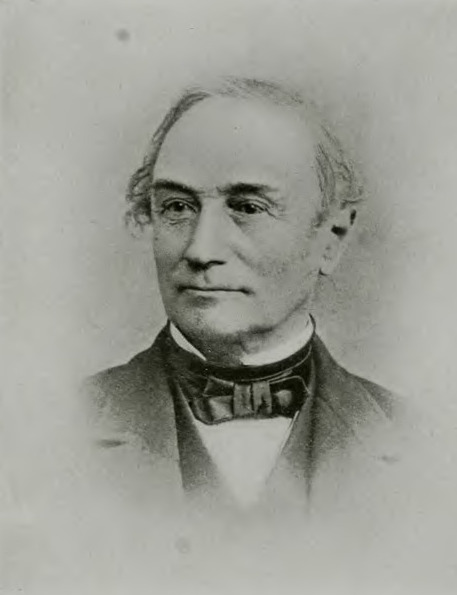
- Born: April 19, 1804; Glassboro
- Died: March 20, 1876 (aged 71); Camden
- Occupation: Lawyer, judge
- Parent(s): Edward Carpenter; Sarah Carpenter
- Position held: Justice of the Supreme Court of New Jersey

Thomas Preston Carpenter (April 19, 1804 – March 20, 1876), was a lawyer and judge of the Supreme Court of New Jersey.

== Personal ==
Carpenter was born at Glassboro, Gloucester County, New Jersey, where his father Edward Carpenter operated a glassworks. He was descendant of Samuel Carpenter, Thomas Lloyd, and Samuel Preston, prominent men in the early days of Pennsylvania. His father dying when he was quite young, Thomas Preston Carpenter spent his early life with his grandfather, at Carpenter's Landing (now Mantua). He married on November 27, 1839 to Rebecca Hopkins of Woodbury, New Jersey. They were the parents of four children. He was an active member of the Protestant Episcopal Church, serving as vestryman, warden, and deputy to the diocesan and general conventions.

== Career ==
After receiving a liberal education, Carpenter studied law with Judge John Moore White of Woodbury, New Jersey, and was admitted as an attorney in September 1830. On October 26, 1838, he was appointed prosecutor of pleas of Gloucester County, New Jersey and took a prominent part in several important trials. In 1845, he was appointed by Governor Charles C. Stratton one of the associate judges of the Supreme Court of New Jersey, his circuit comprising Burlington, Camden, and Gloucester Counties. At his retirement from the judgeship he devoted himself to the practice of law, principally as a counselor, and was eminently successful. At the breaking out of the American Civil War, he joined the Union League of Philadelphia, and gave his entire sympathies to the Union cause.

== Death ==
Thomas Preston Carpenter died at his home in Camden, New Jersey on March 20, 1876.
