= John Runk =

American politician

Member of the U.S. House of Representatives from New Jersey's 3rd district
- In office March 4, 1845 – March 3, 1847
- Preceded by: Isaac G. Farlee
- Succeeded by: Joseph E. Edsall

Personal details
- Born: July 3, 1791 Hunterdon County, New Jersey, U.S.
- Died: September 22, 1872 (aged 81) Lambertville, New Jersey, U.S.
- Party: Whig
- Profession: Politician

John Runk (July 3, 1791 – September 22, 1872) was an American Whig Party politician, who represented New Jersey's 3rd congressional district in the United States House of Representatives from 1845 to 1847.

Runk was born in Milltown (later, Idell), Hunterdon County, New Jersey. He attended the district schools and took charge of the mills and general store on his father's property in Milltown. He was a member of the Board of Chosen Freeholders from Kingwood Township from 1825 to 1833. He was an unsuccessful candidate for sheriff in 1830, and served as high sheriff of Hunterdon County from 1836 to 1838.

Runk was elected as a Whig to the Twenty-ninth United States Congress (March 4, 1845 – March 3, 1847) in an election he won by just 16 votes. His opponent Isaac G. Farlee contested the election on the grounds that Princeton students, ineligible due to residency, had swung the election. A majority of the investigating committee found in Runk's favor, but when his case came before the full House, a motion to remove him and leave the seat vacant failed only after the Speaker cast a tie-breaking vote in his favor, making this the closest contested election in the history of the House. He was an unsuccessful candidate for reelection in 1846, and ran unsuccessfully against Democrat George F. Fort for Governor of New Jersey in 1850.

He moved to Lambertville, New Jersey in 1854 and engaged in the milling business and mercantile pursuits. He died in Lambertville and is interred in Rosemont Cemetery, Rosemont, Hunterdon County, N.J.

Party political offices
| Preceded by William Wright | Whig Nominee for Governor of New Jersey; 1850 | Succeeded by Joel Haywood |
U.S. House of Representatives
| Preceded by Isaac G. Farlee | Member of the U.S. House of Representatives from New Jersey's 3rd congressional district March 4, 1845-March 3, 1847 | Succeeded by Joseph E. Edsall |
