= Daniel Bailey Ryall =

American politician (1798–1864)

Daniel Bailey Ryall (January 30, 1798 – December 17, 1864) was an American Democratic Party politician who represented New Jersey on a general ticket in the United States House of Representatives for one term from 1839 to 1841.

== Early life and education ==
He was born in Trenton, New Jersey where he completed preparatory studies. Later, he attended Trenton Academy. He studied law, was admitted to the bar in 1820, and commenced practice in Freehold Township, New Jersey.

== Political career ==
Ryall was a member of the New Jersey General Assembly in 1831 and 1833–1835 and served as speaker 1833–1835.

Ryall was elected as a Democrat to the Twenty-sixth Congress, serving in office from March 4, 1839, to March 3, 1841.

== After Congress ==
He resumed the practice of law. He died in Freehold, New Jersey in 1864 and was buried there in Maplewood Cemetery.

U.S. House of Representatives
Preceded by Charles C. Stratton	Member of the U.S. House of Representatives from New Jersey's at-large congressional district 1839–1841	Succeeded by Charles C. Stratton
