= William Wright (New Jersey politician) =

American politician

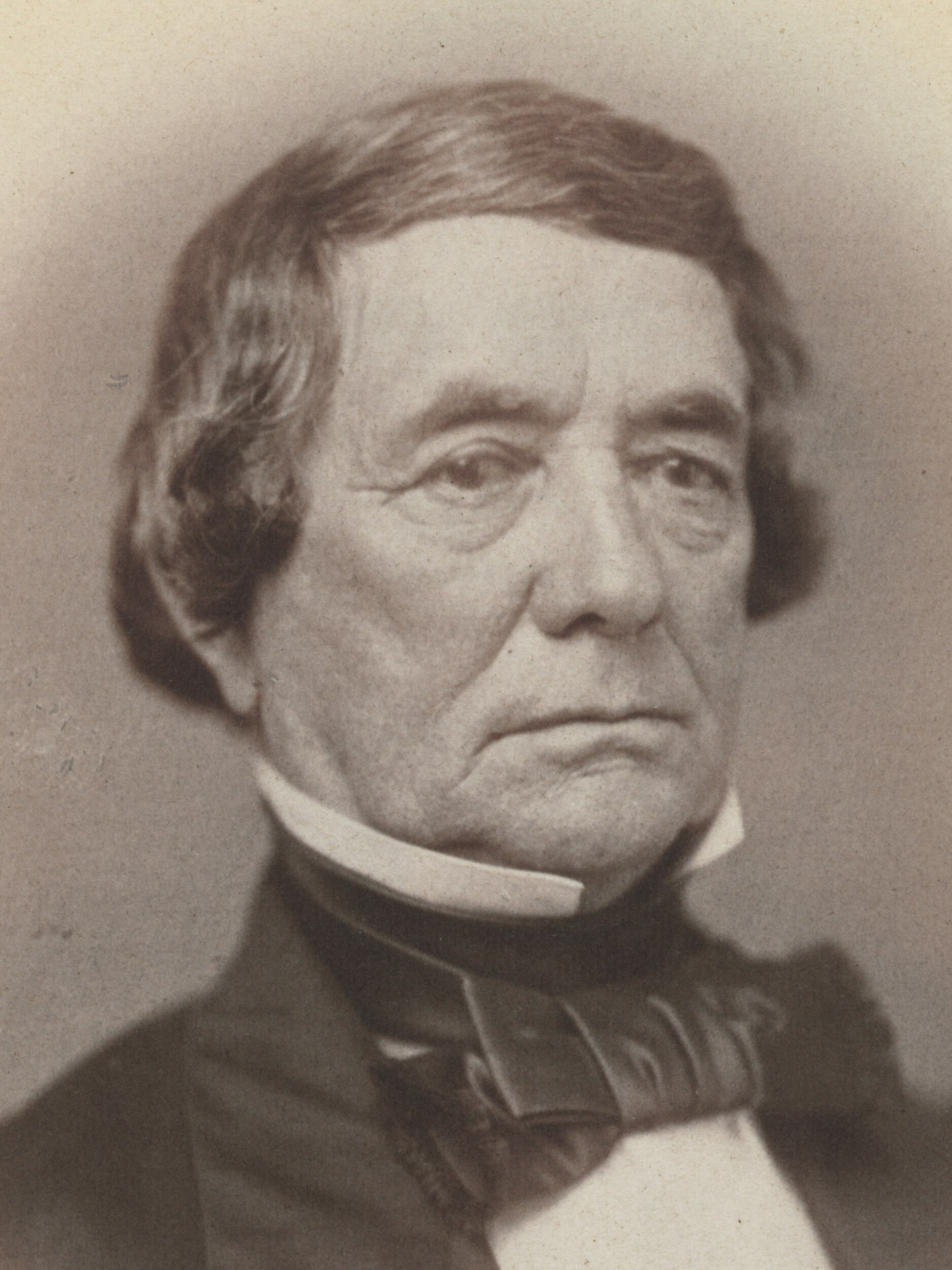
- Wright c. 1859

United States Senator from New Jersey
- In office March 4, 1853 – March 3, 1859
- Preceded by: Jacob W. Miller
- Succeeded by: John C. Ten Eyck
- In office March 4, 1863 – November 1, 1866
- Preceded by: James Walter Wall
- Succeeded by: Frederick T. Frelinghuysen

Member of the U.S. House of Representatives from New Jersey's 5th district
- In office March 4, 1843 – March 3, 1847
- Preceded by: John Bancker Aycrigg; William Halstead; John Patterson Bryan Maxwell; Joseph Fitz Randolph; Charles C. Stratton; Thomas J. Yorke (elected at-large on a Whig Party general ticket)
- Succeeded by: Dudley S. Gregory

Personal details
- Born: November 13, 1794 Clarksville, New York, U.S.
- Died: November 1, 1866 (aged 71) Flemington, New Jersey, U.S.
- Party: Whig (before 1847); Democratic (after 1853)
- Profession: politician

William Wright (November 13, 1794 – November 1, 1866) was an American businessman and politician from New Jersey. He served as the 5th mayor of Newark and represented the state in the United States House of Representatives from 1843 to 1847 and United States Senate from 1853 to 1859 and from 1863 until his death in 1866. Though he was initially a member of the Whig Party, Wright was elected to the House as an independent Whig and ultimately served in the Senate as a member of the Democratic Party.

== Biography ==
He was born in Clarkstown, Rockland County, New York; attended the public schools and Poughkeepsie Academy; was a volunteer for the defense of Stonington, Connecticut, in the War of 1812; learned the saddler's trade and engaged in business in Bridgeport, Connecticut; moved to Newark, New Jersey in 1821 and ran a saddlery and leather business there. He served as mayor of Newark from 1840 to 1843.

On May 25, 1843, Wright was chosen as the second president of the Morris and Essex Railroad to succeed Lewis Condict, a post he held until his death more than twenty years later.

In October 1843, Wright was elected as an Independent Whig to the 28th United States Congress in the new 5th Congressional District (Bergen, Essex, Hudson, and Passaic Counties), and was reelected as a Whig without opposition in 1844 to the 29th United States Congress (March 4, 1845 – March 3, 1847).

He was an unsuccessful candidate for Governor of New Jersey in 1847, and affiliated with the Democratic Party in 1850. Wright was elected as a Democrat to the United States Senate and served from March 4, 1853, to March 3, 1859, but was an unsuccessful candidate for reelection in 1858. He was the chairman, Committee on Manufactures (33rd United States Congress and 34th United States Congress), Committee to Audit and Control the Contingent Expenses (35th United States Congress), Committee on Engrossed Bills (35th Congress); again elected as a Democrat to the United States Senate and served from March 4, 1863 until his death in Newark. He was interred in Mount Pleasant Cemetery in Newark.

== Family ==
In 1819, Wright married Minerva Darrow. They were the parents of three children, Frederick, Catherine, and Edward.

Their son Colonel Edward H. Wright (1824–1913) was a career officer in the United States Army. Edward Wright was the husband of Dorothea Eliza Mason (October 29, 1840 – October 4, 1916). Known as Dora, she was the daughter of Governor Stevens T. Mason. Edward and Dora Wright were the parents of William M. Wright, a U.S. Army officer who attained the rank of lieutenant general.

== See also ==
- List of members of the United States Congress who died in office (1790–1899)

Party political offices
Preceded by Charles C. Stratton	Whig Nominee for Governor of New Jersey; 1847	Succeeded by John Runk
U.S. House of Representatives
Preceded by District re-established	Member of the U.S. House of Representatives from New Jersey's 5th congressional district March 4, 1843-March 3, 1847	Succeeded by Dudley S. Gregory
U.S. Senate
Preceded by Jacob W. Miller	U.S. senator (Class 2) from New Jersey; 1853–1859; Served alongside: John R. Thomson	Succeeded by John C. Ten Eyck
Preceded by James W. Wall	U.S. senator (Class 1) from New Jersey; 1863–1866; Served alongside: John C. Ten Eyck, John P. Stockton, Alexander G. Cattell	Succeeded by Frederick T. Frelinghuysen
