= Matoaca Gay =

American writer and literary scholar

- Born: 20 October 1841; Henrico County, Virginia
- Died: March 26, 1915 (aged 73–74); Rockville, Maryland, USA
- Known for: Society writer, Shakespeare scholar

Matoaca Gay (1841 - 1915) was an American writer and literary scholar. She was born in Henrico County, Virginia to Edward S. Gay, and Catherine Tazewell Gay. Seventh in a direct line from Pocahontas Matoaka Rebecca Rolfe, for whom she was named, Matoaca was the eldest of six children.

She moved to Washington, D.C. in 1882, on the advice of her friend Sue Virginia Swearingen, the wife of Supreme Court Justice Field.

== Society writer ==
Matoaca Gay wrote a society column under the name of "Bric-a-Brac".

== Shakespearean scholar ==
Matoaca Gay became interested in acting when she lived in Richmond, Virginia. She contacted noted Shakespearean actor Lawrence Barrett, who provided books, advice, and became a life-long friend.

Her long running private Shakespeare study group was made up of Washington society women. Among others:

- Josephine Ward Thomson
- Julia Peete Bate, wife of Senator William B. Bate
- Mary "Polly" Condit-Smith

The gatherings included lectures, group readings of the plays, and guest lectures from some of the leading Shakespearean actors of the time, including Lawrence Barrett and Edwin Booth.

By 1897 she was teaching Shakespeare at the Gunston Institute, a boarding and day school for girls in Washington D. C.

In 1906, she was quoted as saying that she had "taught Shakespeare to everybody in the world except the Pope and the President!"

== Pocahontas Foundation ==
Because of her relationship to Pocahontas, Matoaca Gay was made the honorary president of the Pocahontas Memorial Association. This group began collecting money in 1906, to build the Pocahontas Memorial in Jamestown.
