= Pleasant Plains, New Jersey =

Populated place in Somerset County, New Jersey, US

- Census-designated place
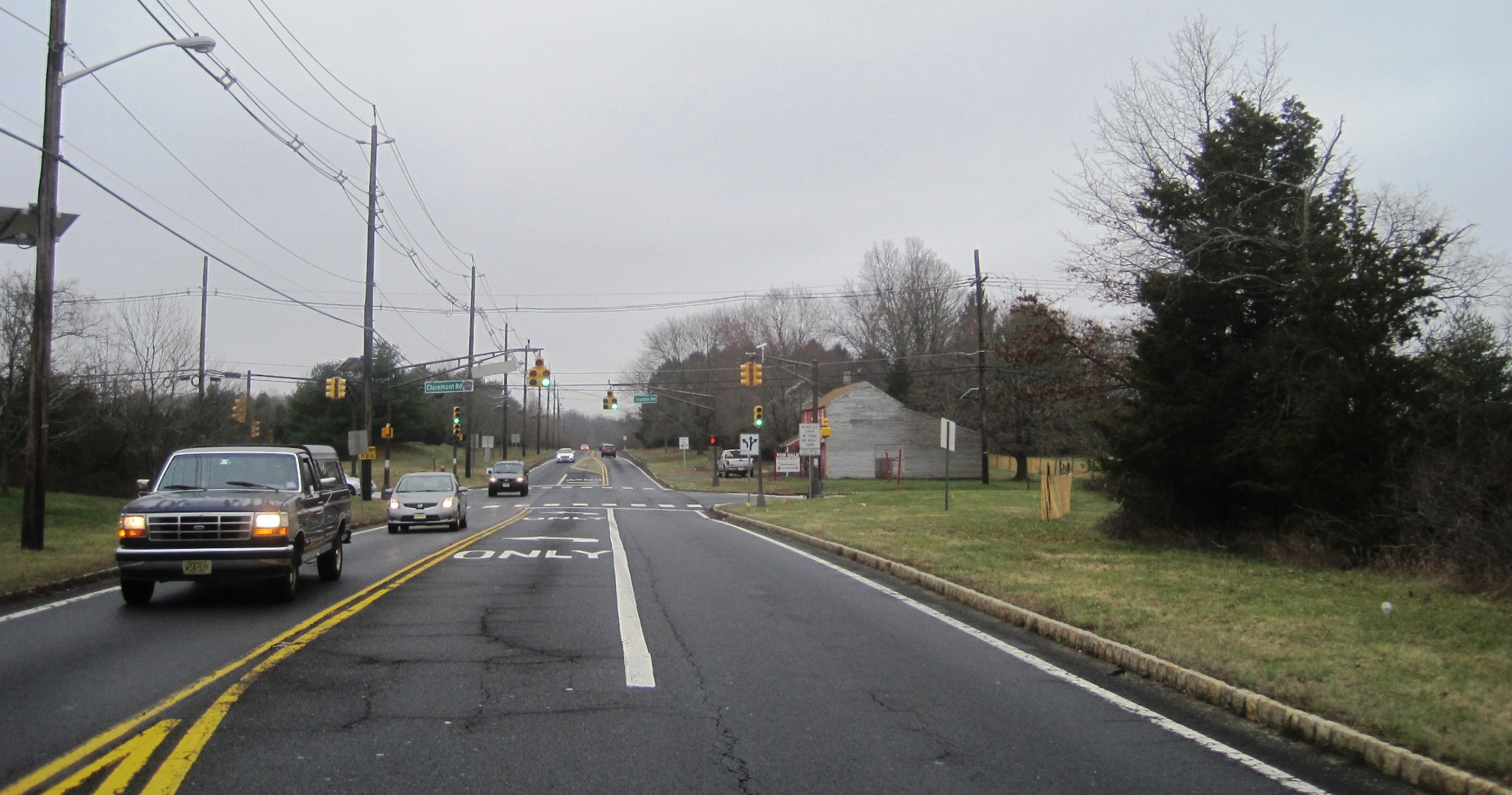
- Looking south along South Middlebush Road (CR 615) approaching Claremont Road (CR 648)

- Location in Somerset County Location in New Jersey Location in the United States
- Coordinates: 40.453121°N 74.576459°W
- Country: United States
- state: New Jersey
- County: Somerset
- Township: Franklin

Area
  - Total: 3.22 sq mi (8.34 km^{2})
  - Land: 3.22 sq mi (8.33 km^{2})
  - Water: 0.0039 sq mi (0.01 km^{2}) 0.17%
- Elevation: 95 ft (29 m)

Population (2020)
  - Total: 792
  - Density: 246.3/sq mi (95.11/km^{2})
- Time zone: UTC−05:00 (Eastern (EST))
  - Summer (DST): UTC−04:00 (Eastern (EDT))
- Area codes: 609/640 and 732/848
- FIPS code: 34-59500
- GNIS feature ID: 02584018

Pleasant Plains is an unincorporated community and census-designated place (CDP) located in Franklin Township, in Somerset County, in the U.S. state of New Jersey. As of the 2020 census, Pleasant Plains had a population of 792. Having no distinct boundaries, a large area in the center of Franklin Township centered on the intersections of South Middlebush Road (County Route 615) with Claremont and Suydam Roads (the former also CR 648) is generally considered Pleasant Plains.

== History ==
Prior to the development of K. Hovnanian's Town and Country Estates in 1998, the area included little more than a collection of 18th and 19th century farms and rural lanes. Its historic rural character may be seen in an estimate from 1882 which listed the Pleasant Plains population at 46.

An icon in the area has been the early 19th century general store and blacksmith shop buildings known since the late 1800s as Laird's Brothers Hardware and Laird's Corner Store.

Another area feature is the Pleasant Plains Cemetery on South Middlebush Road just south of Laird's Corner that has been in use from early settlement of the area until the present day.

Since the early 19th century (and possibly even earlier), the area featured a one-room schoolhouse known as the Pleasant Plains School. Located on the north side of Suydam Road about a half mile west of Laird's Corner, it remained in use until about 1931 when the Township started decommissioning its one-room schoolhouses in favor of larger regional schools. Moved across the road on log rollers, it was converted into a residence and used until the late 20th century when it was threatened with demolition to make way for the Town and County development. Instead, it was moved to the Township's Municipal Complex on DeMott Lane where it awaits further rehabilitation.

The Six Mile Run Historic District listed on the New Jersey and National Register of Historic Places includes a number of properties in the Pleasant Plains area.

== Geography ==
According to the United States Census Bureau, Pleasant Plains had a total area of 3.221 square miles (8.342 km^{2}), including 3.215 square miles (8.328 km^{2}) of land and 0.006 square miles (0.014 km^{2}) of water (0.17%).

== Demographics ==
Historical population
Census	Pop.	Note	%±
2010	922		—
2020	792		−14.1%
Population sources: 2010 2020

Pleasant Plains first appeared as a census designated place in the 2010 U.S. census.

=== 2020 census ===
Pleasant Plains CDP, New Jersey – Racial and ethnic composition Note: the US Census treats Hispanic/Latino as an ethnic category. This table excludes Latinos from the racial categories and assigns them to a separate category. Hispanics/Latinos may be of any race.
Race / Ethnicity (NH = Non-Hispanic)	Pop 2010	Pop 2020	% 2010	% 2020
White alone (NH)	346	256	37.53%	32.32%
Black or African American alone (NH)	198	162	21.48%	20.45%
Native American or Alaska Native alone (NH)	2	2	0.22%	0.25%
Asian alone (NH)	310	309	33.62%	39.02%
Native Hawaiian or Pacific Islander alone (NH)	0	0	0.00%	0.00%
Other race alone (NH)	6	3	0.65%	0.38%
Mixed race or Multiracial (NH)	13	26	1.41%	3.28%
Hispanic or Latino (any race)	47	34	5.10%	4.29%
Total	922	792	100.00%	100.00%

=== 2010 census ===
The 2010 United States census counted 922 people, 254 households, and 236 families in the CDP. The population density was 286.8 per square mile (110.7/km^{2}). There were 257 housing units at an average density of 79.9 per square mile (30.8/km^{2}). The racial makeup was 40.13% (370) White, 21.80% (201) Black or African American, 0.22% (2) Native American, 33.62% (310) Asian, 0.00% (0) Pacific Islander, 2.82% (26) from other races, and 1.41% (13) from two or more races. Hispanic or Latino of any race were 5.10% (47) of the population.

Of the 254 households, 57.1% had children under the age of 18; 85.0% were married couples living together; 5.5% had a female householder with no husband present and 7.1% were non-families. Of all households, 5.9% were made up of individuals and 0.8% had someone living alone who was 65 years of age or older. The average household size was 3.63 and the average family size was 3.73.

30.4% of the population were under the age of 18, 5.6% from 18 to 24, 23.6% from 25 to 44, 32.9% from 45 to 64, and 7.5% who were 65 years of age or older. The median age was 41.1 years. For every 100 females, the population had 97.0 males. For every 100 females ages 18 and older there were 93.4 males.

== Cemetery ==
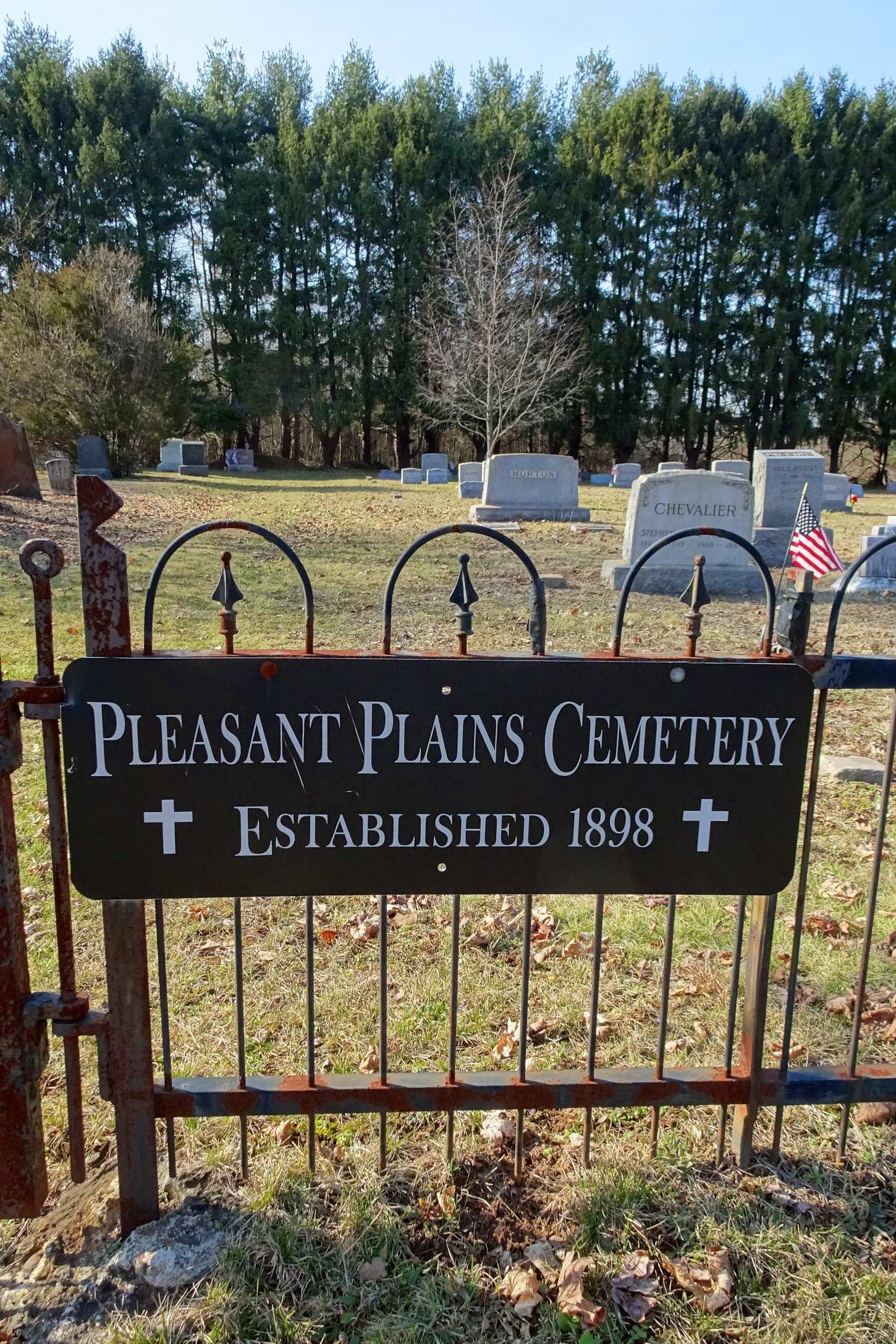
Cemetery information sign

The Pleasant Plains Cemetery, located on South Middlebush Road just south of Laird's Corner, was established in 1898.

== Sources ==
- Brahms, William B. Franklin Township, Somerset County, NJ: A History, Franklin Township Public Library, 1998; ISBN 0-9668586-0-3
