= John Renshaw Thomson =

American politician

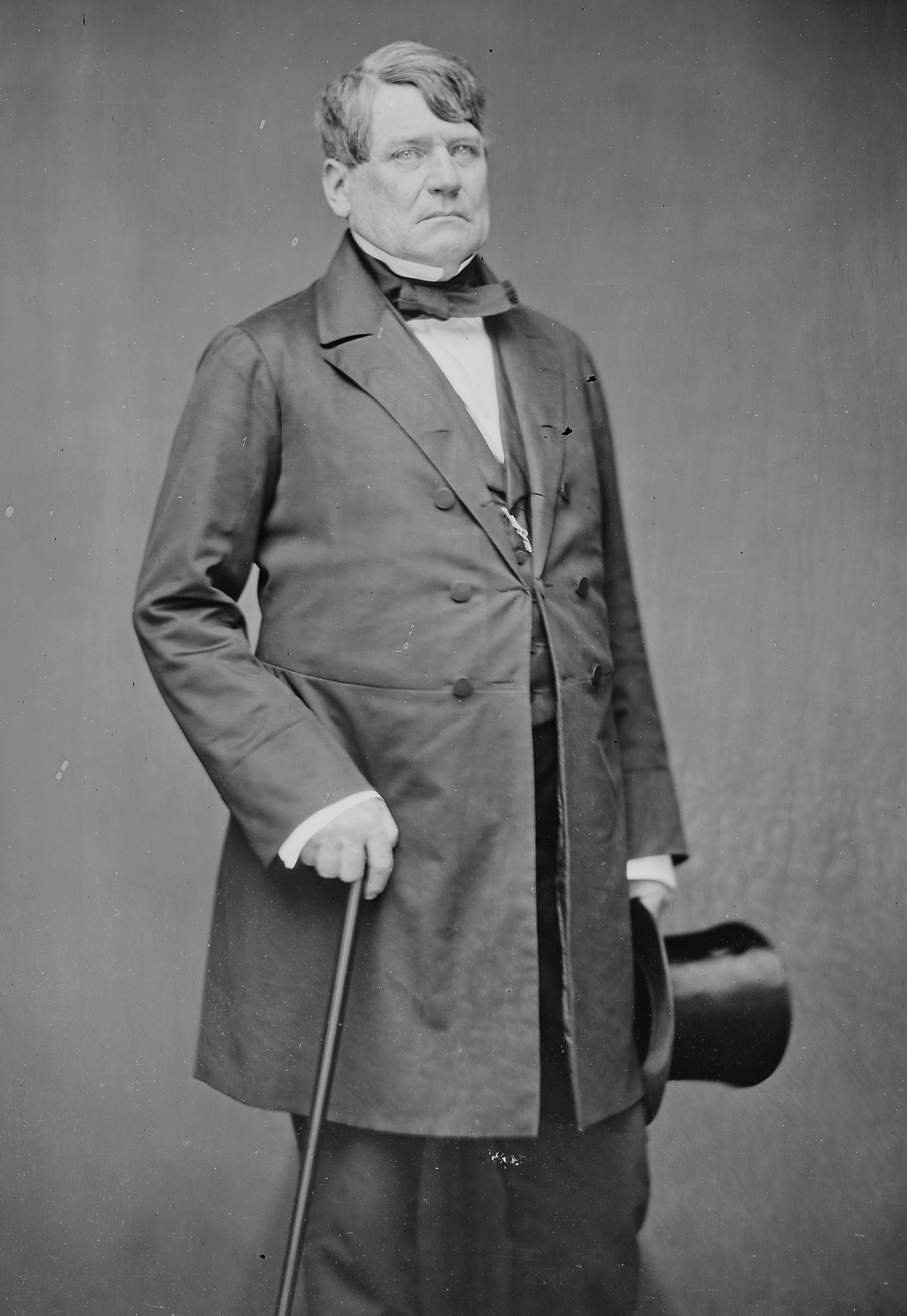

United States Senator from New Jersey
- In office March 4, 1853 – September 12, 1862
- Preceded by: Robert F. Stockton
- Succeeded by: Richard S. Field

Personal details
- Born: September 25, 1800 Philadelphia, Pennsylvania, U.S.
- Died: September 12, 1862 (aged 61) Princeton, New Jersey, U.S.
- Resting place: Princeton Cemetery, Princeton, New Jersey
- Party: Democratic
- Spouse(s): Annis Stockton (m. 1825–1842, her death); Josephine A. Ward (m. 1845-1862, his death)
- Relations: Richard Stockton (father-in-law); Robert F. Stockton (brother-in-law); Aaron Ward (father-in-law)
- Education: Princeton University (attended)
- Occupation: Businessman

John Renshaw Thomson (September 25, 1800 – September 12, 1862) was an American merchant who worked in the China Trade and supported emerging industries in New Jersey through his positions on a regional canal company and the Philadelphia and Trenton Railroad. He was elected as a United States senator, serving from 1853 to his death in 1862.

== Life ==
Thomson was born in Philadelphia, Pennsylvania, the son of Edward Thomson (1771-1853) and Ann Renshaw (1773-1842). Among his siblings was a brother Richard Renshaw Thomson (1799-1824).

Their father and his brother, George Thomson, were shipowners extensively involved in the China Trade. Both the named sons eventually worked with their father in China, and Edward succeeded in lobbying Secretary of State John Quincy Adams to appoint first his son Richard as U.S. consul to Canton in 1822, and then to appoint his son John to succeed his deceased brother in 1824 before returning to the U.S. in March 1825.

Thomson attended the common schools in Princeton, New Jersey, and the College of New Jersey (now Princeton University). In 1817, Thomson went to China and assisted his father in the mercantile trade. The son Thomson was appointed as the United States Consul to Canton from 1823 to 1825. He succeeded his late brother Richard Renshaw Thomson, whose sudden death left the position vacant.

In 1825–1826, the father Edward Thomson's business failed. John Thomson returned to the United States and, in the winter of 1825, married Annis Stockton. She was a daughter of Senator Richard Stockton (- NJ). She was a granddaughter of Continental Congressman Richard Stockton and poet Annis Boudinot Stockton. The match brought many financial and political advantages. The young couple settled in Princeton.

Thomson became a director and secretary of the Delaware and Raritan Canal Company. He also became president, and later treasurer, of the Philadelphia and Trenton Railroad. He appointed as a delegate to the New Jersey State Constitutional Convention of 1844. That same year, he was the unsuccessful Democratic candidate for Governor of New Jersey.

Thomson's wife Annis died in 1842. In 1845, he married Josephine A. Ward, daughter of Congressman Aaron Ward of New York. Thomson had no children with either wife.

Thomson was elected as a Democrat to the United States Senate to fill the vacancy caused by the resignation in early 1853 of his brother-in-law Robert F. Stockton. Thomson was re-elected in 1857, and altogether occupied the seat from March 4, 1853, until his death in Princeton, New Jersey in 1862.

He was chairman of the Committee on Patents and the Patent Office (36th United States Congress) and the Committee on Pensions (Thirty-sixth Congress). Thomson was a friend of President James Buchanan, and supported repeal of the Missouri Compromise on the grounds that slavery was permitted under the United States Constitution. He also supported the candidacy of John C. Breckinridge in the 1860 United States Presidential Election. But when southern states began to form the Confederate States of America after the election of Abraham Lincoln, Thomson supported the Union. Although he was a friend of Buchanan, he deserted the former president and his party after the capture of Fort Sumter by the secessionists.

He was interred in Princeton Cemetery. In 1878, his widow Josephine married Maryland governor Thomas Swann. Two years later they separated.

== See also ==
- List of members of the United States Congress who died in office (1790–1899)

U.S. Senate
Preceded by Robert F. Stockton	U.S. senator (Class 1) from New Jersey; March 4, 1853 – September 12, 1862; Served alongside: William Wright, John C. Ten Eyck	Succeeded by Richard S. Field
Party political offices
Preceded by First	Democratic nominee for Governor of New Jersey; 1844	Succeeded by Daniel Haines
