= Joseph Fitz Randolph =

American judge

Joseph Fitz Randolph (March 14, 1803 – March 20, 1873) was an American Whig Party politician who represented New Jersey in the United States House of Representatives from 1837 to 1843 as part of a general ticket covering the entire state.

== Early life and education ==
Randolph was born in New York City on March 14, 1803, and moved in his early childhood with his parents to Piscataway, New Jersey. He was educated by private tutors and in private schools, and prepared for the class of 1825 in Rutgers College, but did not enter. He studied law; was admitted to the bar in 1825 and commenced practice in Freehold Township, New Jersey as a prosecuting attorney for Monmouth County, New Jersey about 1836.

== Career ==
=== U.S. Congress ===
Randolph was elected as a Whig to the Twenty-fifth, Twenty-sixth and Twenty-seventh Congresses, serving in office from March 4, 1837, to March 3, 1843. He served as chairman, Committee on Revolutionary Claims in the Twenty-sixth Congress. He was not a candidate for renomination in 1842.

=== Law ===
After leaving Congress, he moved to New Brunswick in 1843 and resumed the practice of law. He was a delegate to the State constitutional convention in 1844, and served as a member of the committee appointed by the Governor in 1844 to revise the statutes of New Jersey.

He moved to Trenton in 1845 and was an associate justice of the New Jersey Supreme Court from 1845 to 1852. He was a member of the Peace Conference of 1861 held in Washington, D.C., in 1861 in an effort to prevent the impending war.

== Death ==
Randolph moved to Jersey City in 1864, where he died in on March 20, 1873. He was interred in Easton Cemetery in Easton, Pennsylvania.

U.S. House of Representatives
Preceded by James Parker	Member of the U.S. House of Representatives from New Jersey's at-large congressional district 1837–1843	Succeeded by District inactive
