= Political party strength in New Jersey =

Politics in the US state of New Jersey

== Partisan identification in the electorate ==
On November 1, 2025, the New Jersey Department of State reported 6,632,260 registered voters. Among these, 2,526,861 (38.1%) were registered Democrats, 1,673,397 (25.3%) were registered Republicans, 2,358,288 (35.6%) were registered unaffiliated, and 73,714 (1.1%) were registered with other parties.

== Partisan affiliation of elected officials ==
The following table indicates the party of elected officials in the U.S. state of New Jersey:

- Governor
- Lieutenant Governor

The table also indicates the historical party composition in the:

- State Senate
- State General Assembly
- State delegation to the U.S. Senate
- State delegation to the U.S. House of Representatives

For years in which a presidential election was held, the table indicates which party's nominees received the state's electoral votes.

== 1776–2009 ==
Year	Executive office	State Legislature		United States Congress			Electoral votes
Year	Governor	Senate	Assembly	Senator (Class I)	Senator (Class II)	House	Electoral votes
1776	William Livingston (F)			began in 1789			
...	William Livingston (F)			began in 1789			
1788	William Livingston (F)			began in 1789			
1789	William Livingston (F)	F majority	F majority	Jonathan Elmer (PA)	William Paterson (PA)	4PA	George Washington (I) ✓
1790	Elisha Lawrence (F) (Note: Acting.)	F majority	F majority	Jonathan Elmer (PA)	William Paterson (PA)	4PA	George Washington (I) ✓
1790	William Paterson (F)	F majority	F majority	Jonathan Elmer (PA)	William Paterson (PA)	4PA	George Washington (I) ✓
1791	William Paterson (F)	F majority	F majority	John Rutherfurd (PA)	Philemon Dickinson (PA)	3PA, 1I	George Washington (I) ✓
1792	William Paterson (F)	F majority	DR majority	John Rutherfurd (PA)	Philemon Dickinson (PA)	3PA, 1I	George Washington (I) ✓
1793	Thomas Henderson (F)	F majority	DR majority	John Rutherfurd (PA)	Frederick Frelinghuysen (PA)	5PA	George Washington (I) ✓
1793	Richard Howell (F)	F majority	DR majority	John Rutherfurd (PA)	Frederick Frelinghuysen (PA)	5PA	George Washington (I) ✓
1794	Richard Howell (F)	F majority	DR majority	John Rutherfurd (PA)	Frederick Frelinghuysen (PA)	4PA, 1I (Note: Abraham Clark, a member of the Pro-Administration Party, died September 15, 1794, and Aaron Kitchell was elected to fill his vacancy.)	George Washington (I) ✓
1795	Richard Howell (F)	F majority	DR majority	John Rutherfurd (F)	Frederick Frelinghuysen (F)	4F, 1I	George Washington (I) ✓
1796	Richard Howell (F)	F majority	DR majority	John Rutherfurd (F)	Frederick Frelinghuysen (F)	4F, 1I	John Adams/ Thomas Pinckney (F) ✓
1797	Richard Howell (F)	DR majority	F majority	Franklin Davenport (F)	Richard Stockton (F)	5F	John Adams/ Thomas Pinckney (F) ✓
1798	Richard Howell (F)	DR majority	DR majority	Franklin Davenport (F)	Richard Stockton (F)	5F	John Adams/ Thomas Pinckney (F) ✓
1799	Richard Howell (F)	F majority	F majority	James Schureman (F)	Jonathan Dayton (F)	3DR, 2F	John Adams/ Thomas Pinckney (F) ✓
1800	Richard Howell (F)	F majority	F majority	James Schureman (F)	Jonathan Dayton (F)	3DR, 2F	John Adams/ Charles Cotesworth Pinckney (F) ✗
1801	Joseph Bloomfield (DR)	9F, 4DR	28F, 11DR	Aaron Ogden (F)	Jonathan Dayton (F)	5DR	John Adams/ Charles Cotesworth Pinckney (F) ✗
1802	John Lambert (DR)	7F, 6DR	24DR, 16F	Aaron Ogden (F)	Jonathan Dayton (F)	5DR	John Adams/ Charles Cotesworth Pinckney (F) ✗
1803	Joseph Bloomfield (DR)	8DR, 5F	20F, 19DR, 1? (Note: A Federalist, William Coxe Jr., was elected Speaker, and the Federalists organized the chamber.)	John Condit (DR)	Jonathan Dayton (F)	6DR	John Adams/ Charles Cotesworth Pinckney (F) ✗
1804	Joseph Bloomfield (DR)	8DR, 5F	25DR, 14F, 1?	John Condit (DR)	Jonathan Dayton (F)	6DR	Thomas Jefferson/ George Clinton (DR) ✓
1805	Joseph Bloomfield (DR)	9DR, 4F	28DR, 12F	John Condit (DR)	Aaron Kitchell (DR)	6DR	Thomas Jefferson/ George Clinton (DR) ✓
1806	Joseph Bloomfield (DR)	8DR, 5F	25DR, 14F, 1OR	John Condit (DR)	Aaron Kitchell (DR)	6DR	Thomas Jefferson/ George Clinton (DR) ✓
1807	Joseph Bloomfield (DR)	7F, 6DR	21DR, 19F	John Condit (DR)	Aaron Kitchell (DR)	6DR	Thomas Jefferson/ George Clinton (DR) ✓
1808	Joseph Bloomfield (DR)	9DR, 4F	25DR, 15F	John Condit (DR)	Aaron Kitchell (DR)	6DR	James Madison/ George Clinton (DR) ✓
1809	Joseph Bloomfield (DR)	7DR, 6F	23DR, 17F	John Lambert (DR)	John Condit (DR)	6DR	James Madison/ George Clinton (DR) ✓
1810	Joseph Bloomfield (DR)	8DR, 5F	24DR, 16F	John Lambert (DR)	John Condit (DR)	6DR	James Madison/ George Clinton (DR) ✓
1811	Joseph Bloomfield (DR)	8DR, 5F	26DR, 14F	John Lambert (DR)	John Condit (DR)	6DR	James Madison/ George Clinton (DR) ✓
1812	Aaron Ogden (F)	9DR, 4F	30DR, 10F	John Lambert (DR)	John Condit (DR)	6DR	DeWitt Clinton/ Jared Ingersoll (F) ✗
1813	William Sanford Pennington (DR)	7F, 6DR	23F, 17DR	John Lambert (DR)	John Condit (DR)	4F, 2DR	DeWitt Clinton/ Jared Ingersoll (F) ✗
1814	William Sanford Pennington (DR)	7DR, 6F	23DR, 17F	John Lambert (DR)	John Condit (DR)	3DR, 3F (Note: Jacob Hufty, a Federalist, died on May 20, 1814, and was replaced by Thomas Bines, a Democratic-Republican, on November 2, 1814.)	DeWitt Clinton/ Jared Ingersoll (F) ✗
1815	Mahlon Dickerson (DR)	7DR, 6F	22DR, 18F	James J. Wilson (DR)	John Condit (DR)	6DR	DeWitt Clinton/ Jared Ingersoll (F) ✗
1816	Mahlon Dickerson (DR)	7DR, 6F	27DR, 15F	James J. Wilson (DR)	John Condit (DR)	6DR	James Monroe/ Daniel D. Tompkins (DR) ✓
1817	Isaac Halstead Williamson (D)	8DR, 5F	23DR, 18F	James J. Wilson (DR)	Mahlon Dickerson (DR)	6DR	James Monroe/ Daniel D. Tompkins (DR) ✓
1818	Isaac Halstead Williamson (D)	8DR, 5F	26DR, 16F	James J. Wilson (DR)	Mahlon Dickerson (DR)	6DR	James Monroe/ Daniel D. Tompkins (DR) ✓
1819	Isaac Halstead Williamson (D)	8DR, 5F	27DR, 16F	Samuel L. Southard (DR)	Mahlon Dickerson (DR)	6DR	James Monroe/ Daniel D. Tompkins (DR) ✓
1820	Isaac Halstead Williamson (D)	9DR, 4F	31DR, 12F	Samuel L. Southard (DR)	Mahlon Dickerson (DR)	6DR	James Monroe/ Daniel D. Tompkins (DR) ✓
1821	Isaac Halstead Williamson (D)	9DR, 4F	36DR, 7F	Samuel L. Southard (DR)	Mahlon Dickerson (DR)	6DR	James Monroe/ Daniel D. Tompkins (DR) ✓
1822	Isaac Halstead Williamson (D)	9DR, 4F	30DR, 13F	Samuel L. Southard (DR)	Mahlon Dickerson (DR)	6DR	James Monroe/ Daniel D. Tompkins (DR) ✓
1823	Isaac Halstead Williamson (D)	9DR, 4F	31DR, 12F	Joseph McIlvaine (DR)	Mahlon Dickerson (DR)	6DR	James Monroe/ Daniel D. Tompkins (DR) ✓
1824	Isaac Halstead Williamson (D)	8DR, 5F	29DR, 14F	Joseph McIlvaine (DR)	Mahlon Dickerson (DR)	6DR	Andrew Jackson/ John C. Calhoun (DR) ✗
1825	Isaac Halstead Williamson (D)	J majority	J majority	Joseph McIlvaine (NR)	Mahlon Dickerson (J)	3J, 2NR, 1I	Andrew Jackson/ John C. Calhoun (DR) ✗
1826	Isaac Halstead Williamson (D)	J majority	J majority	Joseph McIlvaine (NR)	Mahlon Dickerson (J)	3J, 2NR, 1I	Andrew Jackson/ John C. Calhoun (DR) ✗
1827	Isaac Halstead Williamson (D)	NR majority	NR majority	Ephraim Bateman (NR)	Mahlon Dickerson (J)	3NR, 2I, 1J	Andrew Jackson/ John C. Calhoun (DR) ✗
1828	Isaac Halstead Williamson (D)	NR majority	NR majority	Ephraim Bateman (NR)	Mahlon Dickerson (J)	3NR, 2I, 1J	John Quincy Adams/ Richard Rush (NR) ✗
1829	Peter Dumont Vroom (D)	9NR, 5J	25NR, 18J	Mahlon Dickerson (J)	Theodore Frelinghuysen (NR)	6NR	John Quincy Adams/ Richard Rush (NR) ✗
1830	Peter Dumont Vroom (D)	8J, 6NR	28J, 15NR	Mahlon Dickerson (J)	Theodore Frelinghuysen (NR)	6NR	John Quincy Adams/ Richard Rush (NR) ✗
1831	Peter Dumont Vroom (D)	10J, 4NR	37J, 13NR	Mahlon Dickerson (J)	Theodore Frelinghuysen (NR)	6NR	John Quincy Adams/ Richard Rush (NR) ✗
1832	Samuel L. Southard (W)	7NR, 7J (Note: A Whig, Elias P. Seeley, was elected as Vice President of the Legislative Council.)	26J, 24NR	Mahlon Dickerson (J)	Theodore Frelinghuysen (NR)	6NR	Andrew Jackson/ Martin Van Buren (D) ✓
1833	Elias P. Seeley (W)	8NR, 6J	33NR, 17J	Samuel L. Southard (NR)	Theodore Frelinghuysen (NR)	6J	Andrew Jackson/ Martin Van Buren (D) ✓
1833	Peter Dumont Vroom (D)	8NR, 6J	33NR, 17J	Samuel L. Southard (NR)	Theodore Frelinghuysen (NR)	6J	Andrew Jackson/ Martin Van Buren (D) ✓
1834	Peter Dumont Vroom (D)	13D, 1NR	41D, 9NR	Samuel L. Southard (NR)	Theodore Frelinghuysen (NR)	6J	Andrew Jackson/ Martin Van Buren (D) ✓
1835	Peter Dumont Vroom (D)	8D, 6W	28D, 21W, 1?	Samuel L. Southard (NR)	Garret D. Wall (J)	5J, 1W	Andrew Jackson/ Martin Van Buren (D) ✓
1836	Philemon Dickerson (D)	9D, 5W	34D, 16W	Samuel L. Southard (NR)	Garret D. Wall (J)	5J, 1W	William Henry Harrison/ Francis Granger (W) ✗
1837	William Pennington (W)	7D, 7W (Note: A Democrat, Jeptha B. Munn, was elected as Vice President of the Legislative Council with the absence of a Whig member of the Council.)	31D, 19W	Samuel L. Southard (W)	Garret D. Wall (D)	6W	William Henry Harrison/ Francis Granger (W) ✗
1838	William Pennington (W)	10W, 6D	35W, 18D	Samuel L. Southard (W)	Garret D. Wall (D)	6W	William Henry Harrison/ Francis Granger (W) ✗
1839	William Pennington (W)	10W, 7D	33W, 20D	Samuel L. Southard (W)	Garret D. Wall (D)	5D, 1W	William Henry Harrison/ Francis Granger (W) ✗
1840	William Pennington (W)	10W, 7D	33W, 20D	Samuel L. Southard (W)	Garret D. Wall (D)	5D, 1W	William Henry Harrison/ John Tyler (W) ✓
1841	William Pennington (W)	13W, 5D	41W, 12D	William L. Dayton (W)	Jacob W. Miller (W)	6W	William Henry Harrison/ John Tyler (W) ✓
1842	William Pennington (W)	9D, 9W (Note: A Democrat, John Cassedy, was elected as Vice President of the Legislative Council.)	34W, 24D	William L. Dayton (W)	Jacob W. Miller (W)	6W	William Henry Harrison/ John Tyler (W) ✓
1843	Daniel Haines (D)	10W, 8D	32W, 26D	William L. Dayton (W)	Jacob W. Miller (W)	4D, 1W	William Henry Harrison/ John Tyler (W) ✓
1844	Daniel Haines (D)	12D, 6W	35D, 23W	William L. Dayton (W)	Jacob W. Miller (W)	4D, 1W	Henry Clay/ Theodore Frelinghuysen (W) ✗
1845	Charles C. Stratton (W)	13W, 6D	40W, 18D	William L. Dayton (W)	Jacob W. Miller (W)	4W, 1D	Henry Clay/ Theodore Frelinghuysen (W) ✗
1846	Charles C. Stratton (W)	12W, 7D	30W, 27D, 1A	William L. Dayton (W)	Jacob W. Miller (W)	3W, 2D	Henry Clay/ Theodore Frelinghuysen (W) ✗
1847	Charles C. Stratton (W)	12W, 7D	40W, 18D	William L. Dayton (W)	Jacob W. Miller (W)	4W, 1D	Henry Clay/ Theodore Frelinghuysen (W) ✗
1848	Daniel Haines (D)	12W, 7D	38W, 20D	William L. Dayton (W)	Jacob W. Miller (W)	4W, 1D	Zachary Taylor/ Millard Fillmore (W) ✓
1849	Daniel Haines (D)	12W, 7D	39W, 19D	William L. Dayton (W)	Jacob W. Miller (W)	4W, 1D	Zachary Taylor/ Millard Fillmore (W) ✓
1850	Daniel Haines (D)	10W, 9D	33W, 25D	William L. Dayton (W)	Jacob W. Miller (W)	4W, 1D	Zachary Taylor/ Millard Fillmore (W) ✓
1851	George F. Fort (D)	10D, 10W (Note: A Democrat, Silas D. Canfield, was elected as President of the Senate.)	30D, 28W	Robert F. Stockton (D)	Jacob W. Miller (W)	4D, 1W	Zachary Taylor/ Millard Fillmore (W) ✓
1852	George F. Fort (D)	13D, 7W	45D, 15W	Robert F. Stockton (D)	Jacob W. Miller (W)	4D, 1W	Franklin Pierce/ William R. King (D) ✓
1853	George F. Fort (D)	13D, 7W	39D, 21W	John Renshaw Thomson (D)	William Wright (D)	4D, 1W	Franklin Pierce/ William R. King (D) ✓
1854	Rodman M. Price (D)	13D, 7W	40D, 20W	John Renshaw Thomson (D)	William Wright (D)	4D, 1W	Franklin Pierce/ William R. King (D) ✓
1855	Rodman M. Price (D)	10D, 9W, 1KN (Note: A Democrat, William Cowper Alexander, was elected to be Senate President.)	29D, 25W, 6KN (Note: A coalition of Whigs and Know-Nothings elected a Whig, William Parry, as Speaker, and organized the chamber.)	John Renshaw Thomson (D)	William Wright (D)	4O, 1D	Franklin Pierce/ William R. King (D) ✓
1856	Rodman M. Price (D)	11D, 5W, 4KN	31D, 15KN, 14W	John Renshaw Thomson (D)	William Wright (D)	4O, 1D	James Buchanan/ John C. Breckinridge (D) ✓
1857	William A. Newell (R)	11D, 6O, 3KN	38D, 22R	John Renshaw Thomson (D)	William Wright (D)	3D, 2R	James Buchanan/ John C. Breckinridge (D) ✓
1858	William A. Newell (R)	15D, 6O	35D, 25R	John Renshaw Thomson (D)	William Wright (D)	3D, 2R	James Buchanan/ John C. Breckinridge (D) ✓
1859	William A. Newell (R)	13D, 8O	36O, 24D	John Renshaw Thomson (D)	John C. Ten Eyck (R)	3R, 2D	James Buchanan/ John C. Breckinridge (D) ✓
1860	Charles Smith Olden (R)	12D, 8R, 1KN	30D, 28R, 2KN (Note: A Democrat, Austin H. Patterson, was elected Speaker.)	John Renshaw Thomson (D)	John C. Ten Eyck (R)	3R, 2D	4 – Abraham Lincoln/ Hannibal Hamlin (R) ✓ 3 – Stephen A. Douglas/ Herschel V. Johnson (D) ✗
1861	Charles Smith Olden (R)	11R, 10D	32D, 28R	Richard Stockton Field (R)	John C. Ten Eyck (R)	3D, 2R	4 – Abraham Lincoln/ Hannibal Hamlin (R) ✓ 3 – Stephen A. Douglas/ Herschel V. Johnson (D) ✗
1862	Charles Smith Olden (R)	10D, 10R, 1I (Note: A War Democrat, Joseph T. Crowell, was elected President of the Senate with Republican support.)	36D, 24R	James Walter Wall (D)	John C. Ten Eyck (R)	3D, 2R	4 – Abraham Lincoln/ Hannibal Hamlin (R) ✓ 3 – Stephen A. Douglas/ Herschel V. Johnson (D) ✗
1863	Joel Parker (D)	13D, 8R	45D, 15R	William Wright (D)	John C. Ten Eyck (R)	4D, 1R	4 – Abraham Lincoln/ Hannibal Hamlin (R) ✓ 3 – Stephen A. Douglas/ Herschel V. Johnson (D) ✗
1864	Joel Parker (D)	14D, 7R	40D, 20R	William Wright (D)	John C. Ten Eyck (R)	4D, 1R	George B. McClellan/ George H. Pendleton (D) ✗
1865	Joel Parker (D)	13D, 8R	30D, 30R (Note: After some days of discussion, a Democrat, Joseph T. Crowell, was elected Speaker.)	William Wright (D)	John P. Stockton (D)	3D, 2R	George B. McClellan/ George H. Pendleton (D) ✗
1866	Marcus Lawrence Ward (R)	11R, 10D	36R, 24D	William Wright (D)	John P. Stockton (D)	3D, 2R	George B. McClellan/ George H. Pendleton (D) ✗
1867	Marcus Lawrence Ward (R)	13R, 8D	33R, 27D	Frederick T. Frelinghuysen (R)	Alexander G. Cattell (R)	3R, 2D	George B. McClellan/ George H. Pendleton (D) ✗
1868	Marcus Lawrence Ward (R)	11D, 10R	46D, 14R	Frederick T. Frelinghuysen (R)	Alexander G. Cattell (R)	3R, 2D	Horatio Seymour/ Francis Preston Blair Jr. (D) ✗
1869	Theodore F. Randolph (D)	12D, 9R	32D, 28R	John P. Stockton (D)	Alexander G. Cattell (R)	3D, 2R	Horatio Seymour/ Francis Preston Blair Jr. (D) ✗
1870	Theodore F. Randolph (D)	13D, 8R	34D, 26R	John P. Stockton (D)	Alexander G. Cattell (R)	3D, 2R	Horatio Seymour/ Francis Preston Blair Jr. (D) ✗
1871	Theodore F. Randolph (D)	12R, 9D	34R, 26D	John P. Stockton (D)	Frederick T. Frelinghuysen (R)	3R, 2D	Horatio Seymour/ Francis Preston Blair Jr. (D) ✗
1872	Joel Parker (D)	12R, 9D	36R, 24D	John P. Stockton (D)	Frederick T. Frelinghuysen (R)	3R, 2D	Ulysses S. Grant/ Henry Wilson (R) ✓
1873	Joel Parker (D)	14R, 7D	44R, 16D	John P. Stockton (D)	Frederick T. Frelinghuysen (R)	6R, 1D	Ulysses S. Grant/ Henry Wilson (R) ✓
1874	Joel Parker (D)	14R, 7D	32R, 28D	John P. Stockton (D)	Frederick T. Frelinghuysen (R)	6R, 1D	Ulysses S. Grant/ Henry Wilson (R) ✓
1875	Joseph D. Bedle (D)	13R, 8D	41D, 19R	Theodore F. Randolph (D)	Frederick T. Frelinghuysen (R)	5D, 2R	Ulysses S. Grant/ Henry Wilson (R) ✓
1876	Joseph D. Bedle (D)	12R, 9D	37R, 23D	Theodore F. Randolph (D)	Frederick T. Frelinghuysen (R)	5D, 2R	Samuel J. Tilden/ Thomas A. Hendricks (D) ✗
1877	Joseph D. Bedle (D)	11D, 10R	30D, 30R (Note: After several days of ballots, a Democrat, Rudolph Rabe, was elected Speaker of the Assembly.)	Theodore F. Randolph (D)	John R. McPherson (D)	4D, 3R	Samuel J. Tilden/ Thomas A. Hendricks (D) ✗
1878	George B. McClellan (D)	12D, 9R	33D, 27R	Theodore F. Randolph (D)	John R. McPherson (D)	4D, 3R	Samuel J. Tilden/ Thomas A. Hendricks (D) ✗
1879	George B. McClellan (D)	11R, 9D, 1I	33R, 27D	Theodore F. Randolph (D)	John R. McPherson (D)	4R, 3D	Samuel J. Tilden/ Thomas A. Hendricks (D) ✗
1880	George B. McClellan (D)	12R, 9D	35R, 25D	Theodore F. Randolph (D)	John R. McPherson (D)	4R, 3D	Winfield Scott Hancock/ William Hayden English (D) ✗
1881	George C. Ludlow (D)	15R, 5D, 1I	34R, 26D	William J. Sewell (R)	John R. McPherson (D)	4R, 3D	Winfield Scott Hancock/ William Hayden English (D) ✗
1882	George C. Ludlow (D)	12R, 9D	35D, 25R	William J. Sewell (R)	John R. McPherson (D)	4R, 3D	Winfield Scott Hancock/ William Hayden English (D) ✗
1883	George C. Ludlow (D)	12R, 9D	35D, 25R	William J. Sewell (R)	John R. McPherson (D)	4R, 3D	Winfield Scott Hancock/ William Hayden English (D) ✗
1884	Leon Abbett (D)	12R, 9D	34D, 26R	William J. Sewell (R)	John R. McPherson (D)	4R, 3D	Grover Cleveland/ Thomas A. Hendricks (D) ✓
1885	Leon Abbett (D)	11R, 10D	34R, 26D	William J. Sewell (R)	John R. McPherson (D)	4R, 3D	Grover Cleveland/ Thomas A. Hendricks (D) ✓
1886	Leon Abbett (D)	13R, 8D	31R, 29D	William J. Sewell (R)	John R. McPherson (D)	4R, 3D	Grover Cleveland/ Thomas A. Hendricks (D) ✓
1887	Robert S. Green (D)	12R, 9D	32R, 28D	Rufus Blodgett (D)	John R. McPherson (D)	5R, 2D	Grover Cleveland/ Thomas A. Hendricks (D) ✓
1888	Robert S. Green (D)	12R, 9D	37R, 23D	Rufus Blodgett (D)	John R. McPherson (D)	5R, 2D	Grover Cleveland/ Allen G. Thurman (D) ✗
1889	Robert S. Green (D)	11D, 10R	32D, 28R	Rufus Blodgett (D)	John R. McPherson (D)	4R, 3D	Grover Cleveland/ Allen G. Thurman (D) ✗
1890	Leon Abbett (D)	11R, 10D	37D, 23R	Rufus Blodgett (D)	John R. McPherson (D)	4R, 3D	Grover Cleveland/ Allen G. Thurman (D) ✗
1891	Leon Abbett (D)	14D, 7R	40D, 20R	Rufus Blodgett (D)	John R. McPherson (D)	5D, 2R	Grover Cleveland/ Allen G. Thurman (D) ✗
1892	Leon Abbett (D)	16D, 5R	42D, 18R	Rufus Blodgett (D)	John R. McPherson (D)	5D, 2R	Grover Cleveland/ Adlai Stevenson I (D) ✓
1893	George Theodore Werts (D)	16D, 5R	39D, 21R	James Smith Jr. (D)	John R. McPherson (D)	6D, 2R	Grover Cleveland/ Adlai Stevenson I (D) ✓
1894	George Theodore Werts (D)	11R, 10D	39R, 21D	James Smith Jr. (D)	John R. McPherson (D)	6D, 2R	Grover Cleveland/ Adlai Stevenson I (D) ✓
1895	George Theodore Werts (D)	16R, 5D	54R, 6D	James Smith Jr. (D)	William J. Sewell (R)	8R	Grover Cleveland/ Adlai Stevenson I (D) ✓
1896	John W. Griggs (R) (Note: Resigned in order to become United States Attorney General.)	18R, 3D	53R, 7D	James Smith Jr. (D)	William J. Sewell (R)	8R	William McKinley/ Garret Hobart (R) ✓
1897	John W. Griggs (R)	18R, 3D	56R, 4D	James Smith Jr. (D)	William J. Sewell (R)	8R	William McKinley/ Garret Hobart (R) ✓
1898	Foster McGowan Voorhees (R)	14R, 7D	37R, 23D	James Smith Jr. (D)	William J. Sewell (R)	8R	William McKinley/ Garret Hobart (R) ✓
1898	David Ogden Watkins (R)	14R, 7D	37R, 23D	James Smith Jr. (D)	William J. Sewell (R)	8R	William McKinley/ Garret Hobart (R) ✓
1899	Foster McGowan Voorhees (R)	14R, 7D	37R, 23D	John Kean (R)	William J. Sewell (R)	6R, 2D	William McKinley/ Garret Hobart (R) ✓
1900	Foster McGowan Voorhees (R)	14R, 7D	43R, 17D	John Kean (R)	William J. Sewell (R)	6R, 2D	William McKinley/ Theodore Roosevelt (R) ✓
1901	Foster McGowan Voorhees (R)	17R, 4D	38R, 22D	John Kean (R)	John F. Dryden (R)	6R, 2D	William McKinley/ Theodore Roosevelt (R) ✓
1902	Franklin Murphy (R)	17R, 4D	46R, 14D	John Kean (R)	John F. Dryden (R)	6R, 2D	William McKinley/ Theodore Roosevelt (R) ✓
1903	Franklin Murphy (R)	14R, 7D	38R, 22D	John Kean (R)	John F. Dryden (R)	7R, 3D	William McKinley/ Theodore Roosevelt (R) ✓
1904	Franklin Murphy (R)	14R, 7D	38R, 22D	John Kean (R)	John F. Dryden (R)	7R, 3D	Theodore Roosevelt/ Charles W. Fairbanks (R) ✓
1905	Edward C. Stokes (R)	14R, 7D	46R, 14D	John Kean (R)	John F. Dryden (R)	9R, 1D	Theodore Roosevelt/ Charles W. Fairbanks (R) ✓
1906	Edward C. Stokes (R)	17R, 4D	57R, 3D	John Kean (R)	John F. Dryden (R)	9R, 1D	Theodore Roosevelt/ Charles W. Fairbanks (R) ✓
1907	Edward C. Stokes (R)	15R, 6D	31D, 29R	John Kean (R)	Frank O. Briggs (R)	6R, 4D	Theodore Roosevelt/ Charles W. Fairbanks (R) ✓
1908	John Franklin Fort (R)	14R, 7D	40R, 20D	John Kean (R)	Frank O. Briggs (R)	6R, 4D	William Howard Taft/ James S. Sherman (R) ✓
1909	John Franklin Fort (R)	13R, 8D	45R, 15D	John Kean (R)	Frank O. Briggs (R)	7R, 3D	William Howard Taft/ James S. Sherman (R) ✓
1910	John Franklin Fort (R)	15R, 6D	41R, 19D	John Kean (R)	Frank O. Briggs (R)	7R, 3D	William Howard Taft/ James S. Sherman (R) ✓
1911	Woodrow Wilson (D) (Note: Resigned in order to become President of the United States.)	12R, 9D	42D, 18R	James E. Martine (D)	Frank O. Briggs (R)	7D, 3R	William Howard Taft/ James S. Sherman (R) ✓
1912	Woodrow Wilson (D)	11R, 10D	37R, 23D	James E. Martine (D)	Frank O. Briggs (R)	7D, 3R	Woodrow Wilson/ Thomas R. Marshall (D) ✓
1913	James Fairman Fielder (D)	12D, 9R	52D, 8R	James E. Martine (D)	William Hughes (D)	11D, 1R	Woodrow Wilson/ Thomas R. Marshall (D) ✓
1913	Leon Rutherford Taylor (D)	12D, 9R	52D, 8R	James E. Martine (D)	William Hughes (D)	11D, 1R	Woodrow Wilson/ Thomas R. Marshall (D) ✓
1914	James Fairman Fielder (D)	11D, 10R	37D, 23R	James E. Martine (D)	William Hughes (D)	11D, 1R	Woodrow Wilson/ Thomas R. Marshall (D) ✓
1915	James Fairman Fielder (D)	11R, 10D	38R, 22D	James E. Martine (D)	William Hughes (D)	8R, 4D	Woodrow Wilson/ Thomas R. Marshall (D) ✓
1916	James Fairman Fielder (D)	13R, 8D	40R, 20D	James E. Martine (D)	William Hughes (D)	8R, 4D	Charles Evans Hughes/ Charles W. Fairbanks (R) ✗
1917	Walter E. Edge (Note: Resigned in order to become a United States senator.)	15R, 6D	44R, 16D	Joseph S. Frelinghuysen Sr. (R)	David Baird Sr. (R)	9R, 3D	Charles Evans Hughes/ Charles W. Fairbanks (R) ✗
1918	Walter E. Edge	15R, 6D	46R, 17D	Joseph S. Frelinghuysen Sr. (R)	David Baird Sr. (R)	9R, 3D	Charles Evans Hughes/ Charles W. Fairbanks (R) ✗
1919	William Nelson Runyon (R)	15R, 6D	30R, 30D (Note: With the split chamber between the parties, a Republican, Arthur N. Pierson, was selected as Speaker after his name was drawn from a hat.)	Joseph S. Frelinghuysen Sr. (R)	Walter E. Edge (R)	8R, 4D	Charles Evans Hughes/ Charles W. Fairbanks (R) ✗
1920	Clarence E. Case (R)	15R, 6D	33R, 27D	Joseph S. Frelinghuysen Sr. (R)	Walter E. Edge (R)	8R, 4D	Warren G. Harding/ Calvin Coolidge (R) ✓
1920	Edward I. Edwards (D)	15R, 6D	33R, 27D	Joseph S. Frelinghuysen Sr. (R)	Walter E. Edge (R)	8R, 4D	Warren G. Harding/ Calvin Coolidge (R) ✓
1921	Edward I. Edwards (D)	15R, 6D	59R, 1D	Joseph S. Frelinghuysen Sr. (R)	Walter E. Edge (R)	11R, 1D	Warren G. Harding/ Calvin Coolidge (R) ✓
1922	Edward I. Edwards (D)	16R, 5D	45R, 15D	Joseph S. Frelinghuysen Sr. (R)	Walter E. Edge (R)	11R, 1D	Warren G. Harding/ Calvin Coolidge (R) ✓
1923	George Sebastian Silzer (D)	17R, 4D	44R, 16D	Edward I. Edwards (D)	Walter E. Edge (R)	6R, 6D	Warren G. Harding/ Calvin Coolidge (R) ✓
1924	George Sebastian Silzer (D)	17R, 4D	42R, 18D	Edward I. Edwards (D)	Walter E. Edge (R)	6R, 6D	Calvin Coolidge/ Charles G. Dawes (R) ✓
1925	George Sebastian Silzer (D)	18R, 3D	47R, 13D	Edward I. Edwards (D)	Walter E. Edge (R)	10R, 2D	Calvin Coolidge/ Charles G. Dawes (R) ✓
1926	A. Harry Moore (D)	18R, 3D	46R, 14D	Edward I. Edwards (D)	Walter E. Edge (R)	10R, 2D	Calvin Coolidge/ Charles G. Dawes (R) ✓
1927	A. Harry Moore (D)	17R, 4D	47R, 13D	Edward I. Edwards (D)	Walter E. Edge (R)	9R, 3D	Calvin Coolidge/ Charles G. Dawes (R) ✓
1928	A. Harry Moore (D)	18R, 3D	46R, 14D	Edward I. Edwards (D)	Walter E. Edge (R)	9R, 3D	Herbert Hoover/ Charles Curtis (R) ✓
1929	Morgan Foster Larson (R)	18R, 3D	48R, 12D	Hamilton F. Kean (R)	David Baird Jr. (R)	10R, 2D	Herbert Hoover/ Charles Curtis (R) ✓
1930	Morgan Foster Larson (R)	17R, 4D	46R, 14D	Hamilton F. Kean (R)	David Baird Jr. (R)	10R, 2D	Herbert Hoover/ Charles Curtis (R) ✓
1931	Morgan Foster Larson (R)	17R, 4D	46R, 14D	Hamilton F. Kean (R)	Dwight Morrow (R)	8R, 4D	Herbert Hoover/ Charles Curtis (R) ✓
1932	A. Harry Moore (D)	15R, 6D	34D, 26R	Hamilton F. Kean (R)	Dwight Morrow (R)	8R, 4D	Franklin D. Roosevelt/ John Nance Garner (D) ✓
1933	A. Harry Moore (D)	15R, 6D	38R, 22D	Hamilton F. Kean (R)	W. Warren Barbour (R)	10R, 4D	Franklin D. Roosevelt/ John Nance Garner (D) ✓
1934	A. Harry Moore (D)	15R, 6D	33R, 27D	Hamilton F. Kean (R)	W. Warren Barbour (R)	10R, 4D	Franklin D. Roosevelt/ John Nance Garner (D) ✓
1935	Clifford Ross Powell (R)	15R, 6D	34R, 26D	A. Harry Moore (D)	W. Warren Barbour (R)	10R, 4D	Franklin D. Roosevelt/ John Nance Garner (D) ✓
1935	Horace Griggs Prall (R)	15R, 6D	34R, 26D	A. Harry Moore (D)	W. Warren Barbour (R)	10R, 4D	Franklin D. Roosevelt/ John Nance Garner (D) ✓
1935	Harold G. Hoffman (R)	15R, 6D	34R, 26D	A. Harry Moore (D)	W. Warren Barbour (R)	10R, 4D	Franklin D. Roosevelt/ John Nance Garner (D) ✓
1936	Harold G. Hoffman (R)	13R, 8D	42R, 18D	A. Harry Moore (D)	W. Warren Barbour (R)	10R, 4D	Franklin D. Roosevelt/ John Nance Garner (D) ✓
1937	Harold G. Hoffman (R)	11R, 10D	39D, 21R	John Milton (D)	William H. Smathers (D)	7R, 7D	Franklin D. Roosevelt/ John Nance Garner (D) ✓
1938	A. Harry Moore (D)	13R, 8D	41R, 19D	John Milton (D)	William H. Smathers (D)	7R, 7D	Franklin D. Roosevelt/ John Nance Garner (D) ✓
1939	A. Harry Moore (D)	15R, 6D	45R, 15D	W. Warren Barbour (R)	William H. Smathers (D)	11R, 3D	Franklin D. Roosevelt/ John Nance Garner (D) ✓
1940	A. Harry Moore (D)	15R, 6D	45R, 15D	W. Warren Barbour (R)	William H. Smathers (D)	11R, 3D	Franklin D. Roosevelt/ Henry A. Wallace (D) ✓
1941	Charles Edison (D)	17R, 4D	44R, 16D	W. Warren Barbour (R)	William H. Smathers (D)	10R, 4D	Franklin D. Roosevelt/ Henry A. Wallace (D) ✓
1942	Charles Edison (D)	17R, 4D	44R, 16D	W. Warren Barbour (R)	William H. Smathers (D)	10R, 4D	Franklin D. Roosevelt/ Henry A. Wallace (D) ✓
1943	Charles Edison (D)	18R, 3D	44R, 16D	Arthur Walsh (D)	Albert W. Hawkes (R)	11R, 3D	Franklin D. Roosevelt/ Henry A. Wallace (D) ✓
1944	Walter E. Edge (R)	18R, 3D	44R, 16D	Arthur Walsh (D)	Albert W. Hawkes (R)	11R, 3D	Franklin D. Roosevelt/ Harry S. Truman (D) ✓
1945	Walter E. Edge (R)	17R, 4D	42R, 18D	H. Alexander Smith (R)	Albert W. Hawkes (R)	12R, 2D	Franklin D. Roosevelt/ Harry S. Truman (D) ✓
1946	Walter E. Edge (R)	17R, 4D	41R, 19D	H. Alexander Smith (R)	Albert W. Hawkes (R)	12R, 2D	Franklin D. Roosevelt/ Harry S. Truman (D) ✓
1947	Alfred E. Driscoll (R)	15R, 6D	48R, 12D	H. Alexander Smith (R)	Albert W. Hawkes (R)	12R, 2D	Franklin D. Roosevelt/ Harry S. Truman (D) ✓
1948	Alfred E. Driscoll (R)	17R, 4D	45R, 15D	H. Alexander Smith (R)	Albert W. Hawkes (R)	12R, 2D	Thomas E. Dewey/ Earl Warren (R) ✗
1949	Alfred E. Driscoll (R)	15R, 6D	44R, 16D	H. Alexander Smith (R)	Robert C. Hendrickson (R)	9R, 5D	Thomas E. Dewey/ Earl Warren (R) ✗
1950	Alfred E. Driscoll (R)	14R, 7D	38R, 22D	H. Alexander Smith (R)	Robert C. Hendrickson (R)	9R, 5D	Thomas E. Dewey/ Earl Warren (R) ✗
1951	Alfred E. Driscoll (R)	14R, 7D	38R, 22D	H. Alexander Smith (R)	Robert C. Hendrickson (R)	9R, 5D	Thomas E. Dewey/ Earl Warren (R) ✗
1952	Alfred E. Driscoll (R)	16R, 5D	43R, 17D	H. Alexander Smith (R)	Robert C. Hendrickson (R)	9R, 5D	Dwight D. Eisenhower/ Richard Nixon (R) ✓
1953	Alfred E. Driscoll (R)	16R, 5D	43R, 17D	H. Alexander Smith (R)	Robert C. Hendrickson (R)	8R, 6D	Dwight D. Eisenhower/ Richard Nixon (R) ✓
1954	Robert B. Meyner (D)	17R, 4D	40R, 20D	H. Alexander Smith (R)	Robert C. Hendrickson (R)	8R, 6D	Dwight D. Eisenhower/ Richard Nixon (R) ✓
1955	Robert B. Meyner (D)	17R, 4D	40R, 20D	H. Alexander Smith (R)	Clifford P. Case (R)	8R, 6D	Dwight D. Eisenhower/ Richard Nixon (R) ✓
1956	Robert B. Meyner (D)	14R, 7D	40R, 20D	H. Alexander Smith (R)	Clifford P. Case (R)	8R, 6D	Dwight D. Eisenhower/ Richard Nixon (R) ✓
1957	Robert B. Meyner (D)	14R, 7D	40R, 20D	H. Alexander Smith (R)	Clifford P. Case (R)	10R, 4D	Dwight D. Eisenhower/ Richard Nixon (R) ✓
1958	Robert B. Meyner (D)	13R, 8D	42D, 18R	H. Alexander Smith (R)	Clifford P. Case (R)	10R, 4D	Dwight D. Eisenhower/ Richard Nixon (R) ✓
1959	Robert B. Meyner (D)	13R, 8D	42D, 18R	Harrison A. Williams (D)	Clifford P. Case (R)	9R, 5D	Dwight D. Eisenhower/ Richard Nixon (R) ✓
1960	Robert B. Meyner (D)	11R, 10D	34D, 26R	Harrison A. Williams (D)	Clifford P. Case (R)	9R, 5D	John F. Kennedy/ Lyndon B. Johnson (D) ✓
1961	Robert B. Meyner (D)	11R, 10D	34D, 26R	Harrison A. Williams (D)	Clifford P. Case (R)	8R, 6D	John F. Kennedy/ Lyndon B. Johnson (D) ✓
1962	Richard J. Hughes (D)	11R, 10D	38D, 22R	Harrison A. Williams (D)	Clifford P. Case (R)	8R, 6D	John F. Kennedy/ Lyndon B. Johnson (D) ✓
1963	Richard J. Hughes (D)	11R, 10D	38D, 22R	Harrison A. Williams (D)	Clifford P. Case (R)	8R, 7D	John F. Kennedy/ Lyndon B. Johnson (D) ✓
1964	Richard J. Hughes (D)	15R, 6D	33R, 27D	Harrison A. Williams (D)	Clifford P. Case (R)	8R, 7D	Lyndon B. Johnson/ Hubert Humphrey (D) ✓
1965	Richard J. Hughes (D)	15R, 6D	33R, 27D	Harrison A. Williams (D)	Clifford P. Case (R)	11D, 4R	Lyndon B. Johnson/ Hubert Humphrey (D) ✓
1966	Richard J. Hughes (D)	19D, 10R	41D, 19R	Harrison A. Williams (D)	Clifford P. Case (R)	11D, 4R	Lyndon B. Johnson/ Hubert Humphrey (D) ✓
1967	Richard J. Hughes (D)	19D, 10R	41D, 19R	Harrison A. Williams (D)	Clifford P. Case (R)	9D, 6R	Lyndon B. Johnson/ Hubert Humphrey (D) ✓
1968	Richard J. Hughes (D)	31R, 9D	58R, 22D	Harrison A. Williams (D)	Clifford P. Case (R)	9D, 6R	Richard Nixon/ Spiro Agnew (R) ✓
1969	Richard J. Hughes (D)	31R, 9D	58R, 22D	Harrison A. Williams (D)	Clifford P. Case (R)	9D, 6R	Richard Nixon/ Spiro Agnew (R) ✓
1970	William T. Cahill (R)	31R, 9D	59R, 21D	Harrison A. Williams (D)	Clifford P. Case (R)	9D, 6R	Richard Nixon/ Spiro Agnew (R) ✓
1971	William T. Cahill (R)	31R, 9D	59R, 21D	Harrison A. Williams (D)	Clifford P. Case (R)	9D, 6R	Richard Nixon/ Spiro Agnew (R) ✓
1972	William T. Cahill (R)	24R, 16D	40D, 39R, 1I (Note: Although the Democrats were the largest party, four Democrats led by David Friedland cut a deal to elect Republican Thomas Kean Speaker in exchange for leading various House committees and becoming a part of their caucus.)	Harrison A. Williams (D)	Clifford P. Case (R)	9D, 6R	Richard Nixon/ Spiro Agnew (R) ✓
1973	William T. Cahill (R)	24R, 16D	40D, 39R, 1I	Harrison A. Williams (D)	Clifford P. Case (R)	8D, 7R	Richard Nixon/ Spiro Agnew (R) ✓
1974	Brendan Byrne (D)	29D, 10R, 1I	66D, 14R	Harrison A. Williams (D)	Clifford P. Case (R)	8D, 7R	Richard Nixon/ Spiro Agnew (R) ✓
1975	Brendan Byrne (D)	29D, 10R, 1I	66D, 14R	Harrison A. Williams (D)	Clifford P. Case (R)	12D, 3R	Richard Nixon/ Spiro Agnew (R) ✓
1976	Brendan Byrne (D)	29D, 10R, 1I	49D, 31R	Harrison A. Williams (D)	Clifford P. Case (R)	12D, 3R	Gerald Ford/ Bob Dole (R) ✗
1977	Brendan Byrne (D)	29D, 10R, 1I	49D, 31R	Harrison A. Williams (D)	Clifford P. Case (R)	11D, 4R	Gerald Ford/ Bob Dole (R) ✗
1978	Brendan Byrne (D)	27D, 13R	54D, 26R	Harrison A. Williams (D)	Clifford P. Case (R)	11D, 4R	Gerald Ford/ Bob Dole (R) ✗
1979	Brendan Byrne (D)	27D, 13R	54D, 26R	Harrison A. Williams (D)	Bill Bradley (D)	10D, 5R	Gerald Ford/ Bob Dole (R) ✗
1980	Brendan Byrne (D)	26D, 14R	44D, 36R	Harrison A. Williams (D)	Bill Bradley (D)	10D, 5R	Ronald Reagan/ George H. W. Bush (R) ✓
1981	Brendan Byrne (D)	26D, 14R	44D, 36R	Harrison A. Williams (D)	Bill Bradley (D)	8D, 7R	Ronald Reagan/ George H. W. Bush (R) ✓
1982	Thomas Kean (R)	22D, 18R	43D, 37R	Harrison A. Williams (D)	Bill Bradley (D)	8D, 7R	Ronald Reagan/ George H. W. Bush (R) ✓
1982	Thomas Kean (R)	22D, 18R	43D, 37R	Nicholas F. Brady (R)	Bill Bradley (D)	8D, 7R	Ronald Reagan/ George H. W. Bush (R) ✓
1983	Thomas Kean (R)	22D, 18R	43D, 37R	Frank Lautenberg (D)	Bill Bradley (D)	9D, 5R	Ronald Reagan/ George H. W. Bush (R) ✓
1984	Thomas Kean (R)	23D, 17R	44D, 36R	Frank Lautenberg (D)	Bill Bradley (D)	9D, 5R	Ronald Reagan/ George H. W. Bush (R) ✓
1985	Thomas Kean (R)	23D, 17R	44D, 36R	Frank Lautenberg (D)	Bill Bradley (D)	8D, 6R	Ronald Reagan/ George H. W. Bush (R) ✓
1986	Thomas Kean (R)	23D, 17R	50R, 30D	Frank Lautenberg (D)	Bill Bradley (D)	8D, 6R	Ronald Reagan/ George H. W. Bush (R) ✓
1987	Thomas Kean (R)	23D, 17R	50R, 30D	Frank Lautenberg (D)	Bill Bradley (D)	8D, 6R	Ronald Reagan/ George H. W. Bush (R) ✓
1988	Thomas Kean (R)	24D, 16R	42R, 38D	Frank Lautenberg (D)	Bill Bradley (D)	8D, 6R	George H. W. Bush/ Dan Quayle (R) ✓
1989	Thomas Kean (R)	24D, 16R	42R, 38D	Frank Lautenberg (D)	Bill Bradley (D)	8D, 6R	George H. W. Bush/ Dan Quayle (R) ✓
1990	James Florio (D)	23D, 17R	42D, 38R	Frank Lautenberg (D)	Bill Bradley (D)	8D, 6R	George H. W. Bush/ Dan Quayle (R) ✓
1991	James Florio (D)	23D, 17R	42D, 38R	Frank Lautenberg (D)	Bill Bradley (D)	8D, 6R	George H. W. Bush/ Dan Quayle (R) ✓
1992	James Florio (D)	27R, 13D	58R, 22D	Frank Lautenberg (D)	Bill Bradley (D)	8D, 6R	Bill Clinton/ Al Gore (D) ✓
1993	James Florio (D)	27R, 13D	58R, 22D	Frank Lautenberg (D)	Bill Bradley (D)	7D, 6R	Bill Clinton/ Al Gore (D) ✓
1994	Christine Todd Whitman (R) (Note: Resigned to become Administrator of the Environmental Protection Agency.)	24R, 16D	53R, 27D	Frank Lautenberg (D)	Bill Bradley (D)	7D, 6R	Bill Clinton/ Al Gore (D) ✓
1995	Christine Todd Whitman (R)	24R, 16D	53R, 27D	Frank Lautenberg (D)	Bill Bradley (D)	8R, 5D	Bill Clinton/ Al Gore (D) ✓
1996	Christine Todd Whitman (R)	24R, 16D	50R, 30D	Frank Lautenberg (D)	Bill Bradley (D)	8R, 5D	Bill Clinton/ Al Gore (D) ✓
1997	Christine Todd Whitman (R)	24R, 16D	50R, 30D	Frank Lautenberg (D)	Robert Torricelli (D)	7R, 6D	Bill Clinton/ Al Gore (D) ✓
1998	Christine Todd Whitman (R)	24R, 16D	48R, 32D	Frank Lautenberg (D)	Robert Torricelli (D)	7R, 6D	Bill Clinton/ Al Gore (D) ✓
1999	Christine Todd Whitman (R)	24R, 16D	48R, 32D	Frank Lautenberg (D)	Robert Torricelli (D)	7D, 6R	Bill Clinton/ Al Gore (D) ✓
2000	Christine Todd Whitman (R)	24R, 16D	45R, 35D	Frank Lautenberg (D)	Robert Torricelli (D)	7D, 6R	Al Gore/ Joe Lieberman (D) ✗
2001	Christine Todd Whitman (R)	24R, 16D	45R, 35D	Jon Corzine (D) (Note: Resigned after election as governor.)	Robert Torricelli (D)	7D, 6R	Al Gore/ Joe Lieberman (D) ✗
2001	Donald DiFrancesco (R) (Note: State Senate president who held the title of acting governor.) (Note: Per legislation signed by Codey on January 10, 2006, any acting Governor who serves for at least 6 months would officially have the title "governor." This law applied retroactively to DiFrancesco as well.)	24R, 16D	45R, 35D	Jon Corzine (D)	Robert Torricelli (D)	7D, 6R	Al Gore/ Joe Lieberman (D) ✗
2002	Various (Note: From January 8 to January 15, 2002, four men served as Acting Governor. Upon the resignation of Acting Gov. Donald DiFrancesco (R) and before the swearing in of the General Assembly, Attorney General John Farmer Jr. (R) served as Acting Governor for approximately 90 minutes. Upon the swearing of the General Assembly, Robert E. Littell (R), the longest-serving member of the State Senate, assumed the title of President of the Senate (and therefore Acting Governor) for just a few minutes before swearing in the Co-Presidents of the New Jersey Senate, John O. Bennett (R) and Richard Codey (D), who agreed to split the remaining time in Todd Whitman's term evenly, each serving as Acting Governor for three and a half days.)	20D, 20R (Note: A power-sharing agreement was negotiated, with John O. Bennett and Richard Codey running the chamber as co-Presidents. Each committee also had split party control.)	44D, 36R	Jon Corzine (D)	Robert Torricelli (D)	7D, 6R	Al Gore/ Joe Lieberman (D) ✗
2002	Jim McGreevey (D) (Note: Resigned in August 2004, effective November 15, 2004.)	20D, 20R	44D, 36R	Jon Corzine (D)	Robert Torricelli (D)	7D, 6R	Al Gore/ Joe Lieberman (D) ✗
2003	Jim McGreevey (D)	20D, 20R	44D, 36R	Jon Corzine (D)	Frank Lautenberg (D)	7D, 6R	Al Gore/ Joe Lieberman (D) ✗
2004	Jim McGreevey (D)	22D, 18R	47D, 33R	Jon Corzine (D)	Frank Lautenberg (D)	7D, 6R	John Kerry/ John Edwards (D) ✗
2004	Richard Codey (D) (Note: Became acting governor on November 15, 2004, following resignation of McGreevey.)	22D, 18R	47D, 33R	Jon Corzine (D)	Frank Lautenberg (D)	7D, 6R	John Kerry/ John Edwards (D) ✗
2005	Richard Codey (D)	22D, 18R	47D, 33R	Jon Corzine (D)	Frank Lautenberg (D)	7D, 6R	John Kerry/ John Edwards (D) ✗
2006	Jon Corzine (D)	22D, 18R	49D, 31R	Bob Menendez (D) (Note: Appointed to fill a vacancy.)	Frank Lautenberg (D)	6D, 6R	John Kerry/ John Edwards (D) ✗
2006	Jon Corzine (D)	22D, 18R	49D, 31R	Bob Menendez (D)	Frank Lautenberg (D)	7D, 6R	John Kerry/ John Edwards (D) ✗
2007	Jon Corzine (D)	22D, 18R	49D, 31R	Bob Menendez (D)	Frank Lautenberg (D)	7D, 6R	John Kerry/ John Edwards (D) ✗
2008	Jon Corzine (D)	23D, 17R	48D, 32R	Bob Menendez (D)	Frank Lautenberg (D)	7D, 6R	Barack Obama/ Joe Biden (D) ✓
2009	Jon Corzine (D)	23D, 17R	48D, 32R	Bob Menendez (D)	Frank Lautenberg (D)	8D, 5R	Barack Obama/ Joe Biden (D) ✓

== 2010–present ==
Year	Executive offices		State Legislature		United States Congress			Electoral votes
Year	Governor	Lt. Governor (Note: Article V, Section I, paragraph 10 as amended requires the Lieutenant Governor to be appointed as head of a cabinet-level department or administrative agency (not Attorney General).)	Senate	Assembly	Senator (Class I)	Senator (Class II)	House	Electoral votes
2010	Chris Christie (R)	Kim Guadagno (R) (Note: Also appointed as Secretary of State of New Jersey.)	23D, 17R	47D, 33R	Bob Menendez (D) (Note: Resigned following his conviction in a federal corruption trial.)	Frank Lautenberg (D) (Note: Died in office)	8D, 5R	Barack Obama/ Joe Biden (D) ✓
2011	Chris Christie (R)	Kim Guadagno (R)	24D, 16R (Note: Appointed State Senator Tom Goodwin (R) was defeated by Assemblywoman Linda R. Greenstein (D) in a special election.)	47D, 33R	Bob Menendez (D)	Frank Lautenberg (D)	7D, 6R	Barack Obama/ Joe Biden (D) ✓
2012	Chris Christie (R)	Kim Guadagno (R)	24D, 16R	48D, 32R	Bob Menendez (D)	Frank Lautenberg (D)	7D, 6R	Barack Obama/ Joe Biden (D) ✓
2013	Chris Christie (R)	Kim Guadagno (R)	24D, 16R	48D, 32R	Bob Menendez (D)	Frank Lautenberg (D)	6D, 6R	Barack Obama/ Joe Biden (D) ✓
2013	Chris Christie (R)	Kim Guadagno (R)	24D, 16R	48D, 32R	Bob Menendez (D)	Jeffrey Chiesa (R)	6D, 6R	Barack Obama/ Joe Biden (D) ✓
2013	Chris Christie (R)	Kim Guadagno (R)	24D, 16R	48D, 32R	Bob Menendez (D)	Cory Booker (D)	6D, 6R	Barack Obama/ Joe Biden (D) ✓
2014	Chris Christie (R)	Kim Guadagno (R)	24D, 16R	48D, 32R	Bob Menendez (D)	Cory Booker (D)	6R, 5D (Note: Representative Rob Andrews, Democrat of New Jersey's 1st congressional district, resigned.)	Barack Obama/ Joe Biden (D) ✓
2015	Chris Christie (R)	Kim Guadagno (R)	24D, 16R	48D, 32R	Bob Menendez (D)	Cory Booker (D)	6D, 6R	Barack Obama/ Joe Biden (D) ✓
2016	Chris Christie (R)	Kim Guadagno (R)	24D, 16R	52D, 28R	Bob Menendez (D)	Cory Booker (D)	6D, 6R	Hillary Clinton/ Tim Kaine (D) ✗
2017	Chris Christie (R)	Kim Guadagno (R)	24D, 16R	52D, 28R	Bob Menendez (D)	Cory Booker (D)	7D, 5R	Hillary Clinton/ Tim Kaine (D) ✗
2018	Phil Murphy (D)	Sheila Oliver (D) (Note: Also appointed as Commissioner of New Jersey Department of Community Affairs.)	25D, 15R	54D, 26R	Bob Menendez (D)	Cory Booker (D)	7D, 5R	Hillary Clinton/ Tim Kaine (D) ✗
2019	Phil Murphy (D)	Sheila Oliver (D)	25D, 15R	54D, 26R	Bob Menendez (D)	Cory Booker (D)	11D, 1R	Hillary Clinton/ Tim Kaine (D) ✗
2019	Phil Murphy (D)	Sheila Oliver (D)	26D, 14R (Note: Republican Senator Dawn Addiego switched to the Democratic Party.)	54D, 26R	Bob Menendez (D)	Cory Booker (D)	11D, 1R	Hillary Clinton/ Tim Kaine (D) ✗
2020	Phil Murphy (D)	Sheila Oliver (D)	25D, 15R	52D, 28R	Bob Menendez (D)	Cory Booker (D)	10D, 2R (Note: Democratic Representative Jeff Van Drew switched to the Republican Party.)	Joe Biden/ Kamala Harris (D) ✓
2021	Phil Murphy (D)	Sheila Oliver (D)	25D, 15R	52D, 28R	Bob Menendez (D)	Cory Booker (D)	10D, 2R	Joe Biden/ Kamala Harris (D) ✓
2022	Phil Murphy (D)	Sheila Oliver (D)	24D, 16R	46D, 34R	Bob Menendez (D)	Cory Booker (D)	10D, 2R	Joe Biden/ Kamala Harris (D) ✓
2023	Phil Murphy (D)	Sheila Oliver (D)	25D, 15R (Note: Republican Senator Samuel D. Thompson switched to the Democratic Party.)	46D, 34R	Bob Menendez (D)	Cory Booker (D)	9D, 3R	Joe Biden/ Kamala Harris (D) ✓
2023	Phil Murphy (D)	Tahesha Way (D)	25D, 15R	46D, 34R	Bob Menendez (D)	Cory Booker (D)	9D, 3R	Joe Biden/ Kamala Harris (D) ✓
2024	Phil Murphy (D)	Tahesha Way (D)	25D, 15R	52D, 28R	Bob Menendez (D)	Cory Booker (D)	9D, 3R	Kamala Harris/ Tim Walz (D) ✗
2024	Phil Murphy (D)	Tahesha Way (D)	25D, 15R	52D, 28R	George Helmy (D)	Cory Booker (D)	9D, 3R	Kamala Harris/ Tim Walz (D) ✗
2025	Phil Murphy (D)	Tahesha Way (D)	25D, 15R	52D, 28R	Andy Kim (D)	Cory Booker (D)	9D, 3R	Kamala Harris/ Tim Walz (D) ✗
2026	Mikie Sherrill (D)	Dale Caldwell (D) (Note: Resigned.)	25D, 15R	57D, 23R	Andy Kim (D)	Cory Booker (D)	9D, 3R	Kamala Harris/ Tim Walz (D) ✗
2026	Mikie Sherrill (D)	Shirley Emehelu (D)	25D, 15R	57D, 23R	Andy Kim (D)	Cory Booker (D)	9D, 3R	Kamala Harris/ Tim Walz (D) ✗
2027	Mikie Sherrill (D)	Shirley Emehelu (D)	25D, 15R	57D, 23R	Andy Kim (D)	Cory Booker (D)	11D, 1R	Kamala Harris/ Tim Walz (D) ✗

== See also ==
- Politics in New Jersey
- Politics of New Jersey
- Elections in New Jersey
- Law of New Jersey
