= List of elections in 1829 =

The following elections occurred in the year 1829.

- 1829 Chilean parliamentary election
- 1829 Chilean presidential election
- 1829 Norwegian parliamentary election
- 1829–30 Serbian parliamentary election
- 1829 conclave

== North America ==
=== United States ===
==== United States Senate ====
- 1828 and 1829 United States Senate elections
- United States Senate special election in New York, 1829

==== United States House of Representatives ====
- 1828 and 1829 United States House of Representatives elections

==== United States lieutenant gubernatorial ====
- 1829 Connecticut lieutenant gubernatorial election

==== United States gubernatorial ====
- 1829 Alabama gubernatorial election
- 1829 Connecticut gubernatorial election
- 1829 Delaware gubernatorial election
- 1829 Georgia gubernatorial election
- 1829 Maine gubernatorial election
- 1829 Maryland gubernatorial election
- 1829 Massachusetts gubernatorial election
- 1829 Mississippi gubernatorial election
- 1829 New Hampshire gubernatorial election
- 1829 New Jersey gubernatorial election
- 1829 North Carolina gubernatorial election
- 1829 Pennsylvania gubernatorial election
- 1829 Rhode Island gubernatorial election
- 1829 Tennessee gubernatorial election
- 1829 Vermont gubernatorial election

==== United States mayoral elections ====
- 1829 Boston mayoral election

== South America ==
- 1829 Costa Rican Head of State election

== See also ==
- Category:1829 elections
