= Peter Vroom =

Peter Vroom may refer to:

- Peter D. Vroom (1791–1873), American Democratic Party politician
- Peter D. Vroom (U.S. Army officer) (1842–1926), U.S. Army officer
- Peter Vroom, actor most known for playing the fictional character Lance Smart
