= 1829 New Jersey gubernatorial election =

- October 30, 1829
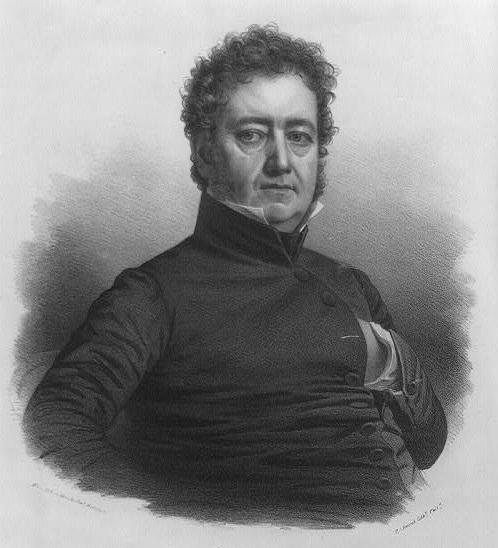

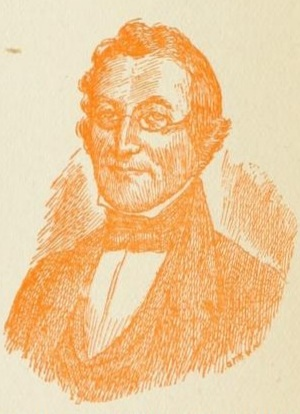
Nominee	Garret D. Wall	Isaac Halstead Williamson
Party	Democratic	Democratic-Republican
Popular vote	39	15
Percentage	69.64%	26.79%
Governor before election
Isaac Halstead Williamson
Democratic-Republican
Elected Governor
Peter Dumont Vroom
Democratic

The 1829 New Jersey gubernatorial election was held on October 30, 1829, in order to elect the governor of New Jersey. Democratic nominee and incumbent United States Attorney for the District of New Jersey Garret D. Wall was elected by the New Jersey General Assembly against incumbent Democratic-Republican governor Isaac Halstead Williamson. Wall however, declined to assume the office of governor on November 2, 1829, whereupon incumbent Democratic member of the New Jersey General Assembly Peter Dumont Vroom was instead elected, by a vote of 42 to Williamson's 13, to replace Wall as governor on November 6, 1829.

== General election ==
On election day, October 30, 1829, Democratic nominee Garret D. Wall was elected by the New Jersey General Assembly by a margin of 24 votes against incumbent Democratic-Republican governor Isaac Halstead Williamson, thereby gaining Democratic control over the office of governor. Wall however, declined to assume the office of governor on November 2, 1829, whereupon incumbent Democratic member of the New Jersey General Assembly Peter Dumont Vroom was instead elected, by a vote of 42 to Williamson's 13, to replace Wall as governor on November 6, 1829. Vroom was sworn in as the 9th governor of New Jersey that same day.

=== Results ===
New Jersey gubernatorial election, 1829
Party	Candidate	Votes	%
Democratic	Garret D. Wall	39	69.64%
Democratic-Republican	Isaac Halstead Williamson (incumbent)	15	26.79%
Democratic	John Joseph Chetwood	2	3.57%
Total votes		56	100.00%
Democratic gain from Democratic-Republican			
