= Carol Levine =

Carol Levine is a home health-care advocate and the Director of the Families and Health Care Project of the United Hospital Fund.

== Career ==
In 1991, she founded The Orphan Project: Families and Children in the HIV Epidemic. From 1987 to 1991, she was the director of the Citizens Commission on AIDS in New York City. She is a fellow of the Hastings Center, an independent bioethics research institution.

Levine is the editor of Always on Call: When Illness Turns Families into Caregivers, The Cultures of Caregiving, and Living in the Land of Limbo.

== Awards ==
- 1993 MacArthur Fellows Program
- 2009 Purpose Prize Fellow

== Works ==
- "President Obama’s Groundbreaking Order on Hospital Visitation and Decision-making", Bioethics Forum, 19 April 2010
- The Cultures of Caregiving: Conflict and Common Ground Among Families, Health Professionals, and Policy Makers, Editors Carol Levine, Thomas H. Murray, JHU Press, 2004, ISBN 978-0-8018-7863-3
- Always on Call: When Illness Turns Families into Caregivers, United Hospital Fund of New York, 2000, ISBN 978-1-881277-53-8
- A generation at risk: the global impact of HIV/AIDS on orphans and vulnerable children, Editors Geoff Foster, Carol Levine, John Williamson, Cambridge University Press, 2005, ISBN 978-0-521-65264-3
- "AIDS and the Ethics of Human Subjects Research", AIDS & ethics, Editor Frederic G. Reamer, Columbia University Press, 1991, ISBN 978-0-231-07358-5
