= Governor Williamson =

Governor Williamson may refer to:

- Isaac Halstead Williamson (1767–1844), 8th Governor of New Jersey
- William D. Williamson (1779–1846), 2nd Governor of Maine
