= Stephen Hart Barlow =

Stephen Hart Barlow (February 1, 1895 – July 8, 1962) was the Quartermaster General of New Jersey until 1942.

== Biography ==
He was born on February 1, 1895. He was the Quartermaster General of New Jersey from 1934 to 1942.
