= George Macculloch Miller =

American lawyer

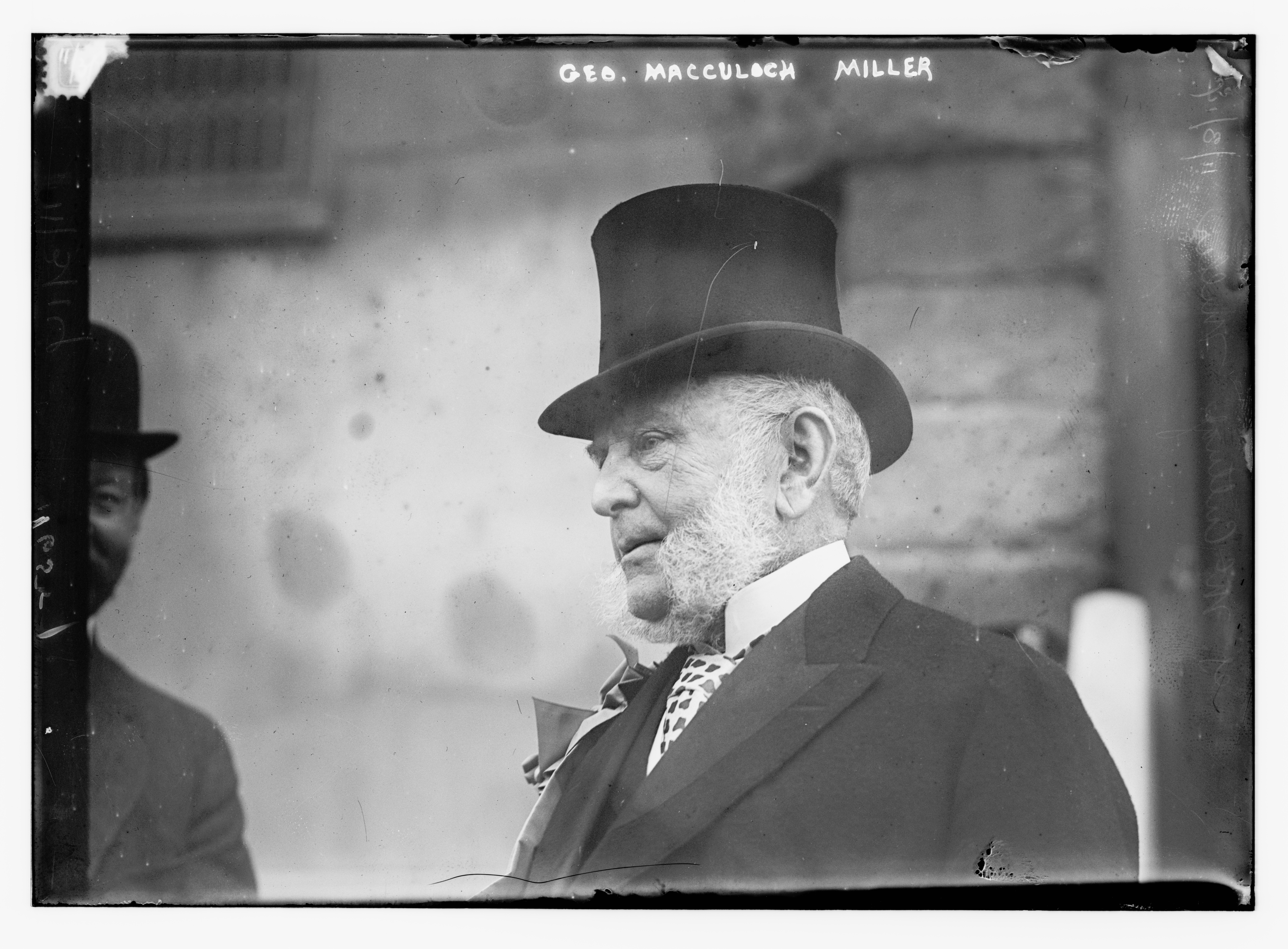
- Born: May 4, 1832; Morristown, New Jersey, U.S.
- Died: November 14, 1917 (aged 85); Manhattan, New York, U.S.
- Education: Burlington College
- Alma mater: Harvard Law School
- Spouse: Elizabeth Odgen Hoffman
- Children: 6
- Parent(s): Jacob W. Miller; Mary Louisa Macculloch

George Macculloch Miller (May 4, 1832 – November 14, 1917), was an American lawyer, and secretary of the Cathedral of St. John the Divine.

== Early life ==
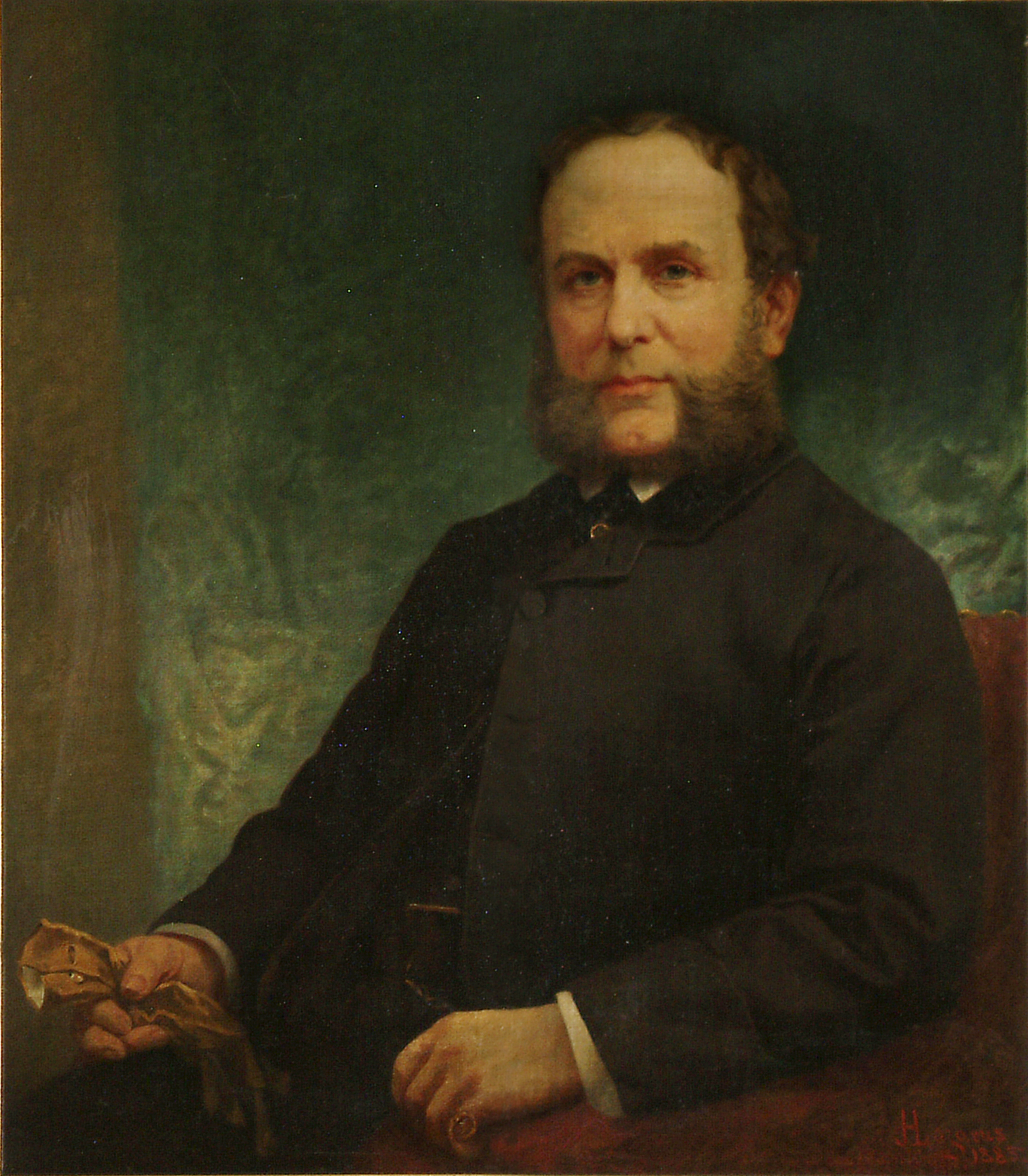
Portrait of Miller, 1855

George Macculloch Miller was born in 1832 in Morristown, New Jersey. He was a son of politician Jacob W. Miller and Mary Louisa Macculloch. His father and J. Pierpont Morgan were directors of the New York, New Haven and Hartford Railroad. He graduated from the Burlington College in New Jersey in 1850 and later Harvard Law School.

== Career ==
George Macculloch Miller and several others began a series of charitable collections among churches and business groups in as early as 1882. In 1893, a committee was appointed "to take steps to have Hospital Saturday and Sunday observed throughout the United States." Members of the committee included Miller, Charles Lanier, Morris K.Jesup, Samuel D. Babcock, Cornelius Vanderbilt, Jesse Seligman, Jacob H. Schiff, and Charles Stewart Smith. The goal of this organization was to have a second collection in churches across the United States and have the money disbursed to hospitals for assistance to indigents. This developed into a larger organization eventually becoming the United Hospital Fund.

== Personal life ==
He married Elizabeth Odgen Hoffman. She was the daughter of Lindley Murray Hoffman and Susan Ogden. Together they had:

- Hoffman Miller
- Mary Louisa Miller
- Leverett Saltonstall Miller
- Elizabeth Agnes Miller, who married tennis player Godfrey Brinley in 1902
- George Macculloch Miller Jr., who died in infancy.
- Edith Macculloch Miller

He died on November 14, 1917, at his home, 270 Madison Avenue in Manhattan.

=== Descendants ===
His grandson, George Macculloch Miller III (d. 1972) married Flora Payne Whitney in Cairo, Egypt in 1927.
