= Quartermaster General of New Jersey =

The following persons were appointed as Quartermaster General of the New Jersey National Guard. The position has no term-limit:

- Stephen Hart Barlow (1895–?) 1934 to 1942.
- C. Edward Murray ? to 1934
- Richard Grant Augustus Donnelly (1834–1905) circa 1898.
- James Jefferson Wilson (1775–1824) 1821 to 1824.
- Garret Dorset Wall (1783–1850) 1815 to 1837(?).
