= William L. Dayton =

American politician (1807–1864)

William Dayton
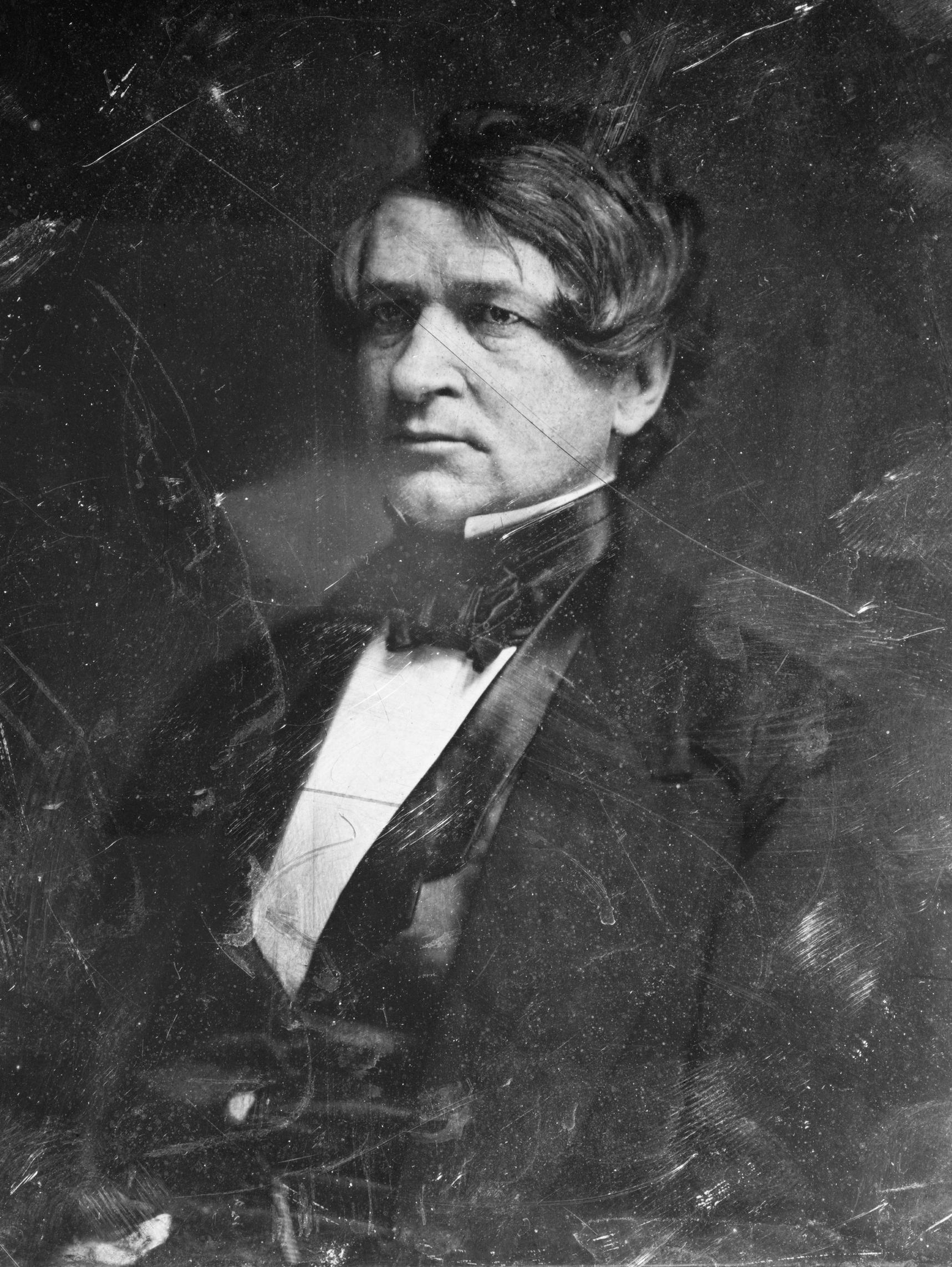
- Dayton circa 1856

United States Minister to France
- In office May 19, 1861 – December 1, 1864
- President: Abraham Lincoln
- Preceded by: Charles J. Faulkner
- Succeeded by: John Bigelow

21st Attorney General of New Jersey
- In office January 20, 1857 – March 18, 1861
- Governor: William A. Newell; Charles Smith Olden
- Preceded by: Richard Thompson
- Succeeded by: Frederick Frelinghuysen

United States Senator from New Jersey
- In office July 2, 1842 – March 3, 1851
- Preceded by: Samuel L. Southard
- Succeeded by: Robert F. Stockton

Personal details
- Born: William Lewis Dayton; February 17, 1807 Basking Ridge, New Jersey, U.S.
- Died: December 1, 1864 (aged 57) Paris, France
- Party: Whig (Before 1854); Republican (1854–1864)
- Spouse: Margaret Dayton
- Education: Princeton University (BA)

William Lewis Dayton (February 17, 1807 – December 1, 1864) was an American politician, active first in the Whig Party and later in the Republican Party. In the 1856 presidential election, he became the first Republican vice-presidential nominee when nominated alongside John C. Frémont. The Republican Party lost that campaign. During the American Civil War, Dayton served as the United States Ambassador to France, a position in which he worked to prevent French recognition of the Confederate States of America.

== Early life ==
Dayton was born in the Basking Ridge of Bernards Township, New Jersey, to farmer Joel Dayton and Nancy (Lewis) Dayton. His father worked as a farmer and mechanic, and was not well off, but the extended Dayton family was long prominent in New Jersey. William L. Dayton was the grand-nephew of Elias Dayton and second cousin of Jonathan Dayton. He graduated from the College of New Jersey (now Princeton University) in 1825. He then studied law with Peter Dumont Vroom, was admitted to the bar in 1830, and became an attorney in Freehold Township, New Jersey.

== Political career ==
In 1837, Dayton was elected to the New Jersey Legislative Council, and he became an associate judge of the New Jersey Supreme Court in 1838. Following the death of U.S. Senator Samuel L. Southard, he was appointed to the United States Senate starting July 2, 1842, and elected to finish the term ending in 1845. As a Senator, Dayton opposed attempts at tariff reduction, arguing it would harm farmers and businesses if enacted. Although he found negotiations for Oregon territory "agreeable," Dayton condemned the annexation of Texas as an attempt to spread slavery and regarded the Mexican-American War as dishonorable. Following the conflict's conclusion, Dayton supported the Wilmot Proviso and voted against the 1850 Compromise, believing it conceded too much to pro-slavery interests. He was re-elected by the New Jersey Legislature as a Whig in 1845 but lost in 1851, ending his service on March 3, 1851.

In 1856, Dayton was selected by the nascent Republican Party as their first nominee for Vice President of the United States over Abraham Lincoln at the Philadelphia Convention. He and his running mate, John C. Fremont, lost to the Democratic ticket of James Buchanan and John C. Breckinridge. Afterwards, he served as New Jersey Attorney General until 1861.

== Ambassador ==
Upon his inaugural, President Lincoln, Dayton's former rival, appointed him Minister to France. He served from May 1861 until his death in December 1864. His service spanned most of the American Civil War, and Dayton served a key role in preventing French intervention in the War.

In France, Dayton was part of a successful lobbying campaign to prevent the government of Napoleon III from recognizing the independence of the Confederacy or allowing Confederate use of French ports.

Dayton died in Paris and was buried in Riverview Cemetery, Trenton, New Jersey.

== Legacy ==
His son, William Lewis Dayton Jr., graduated from Princeton in 1858 and served as President Chester A. Arthur's Ambassador to the Netherlands from 1882–1885.

Later, the town of Dayton, New Jersey, was named in his honor. Dayton Street in Trenton, New Jersey, also memorializes him.

U.S. Senate
Preceded by Samuel L. Southard	U.S. Senator (Class 1) from New Jersey; 1842–1851; Served alongside: Jacob W. Miller	Succeeded by Robert F. Stockton
Preceded by John Leeds Kerr	Chair of the Senate Public Buildings Committee; 1842–1845	Succeeded by Simon Cameron
Party political offices
New political party	Republican nominee for Vice President of the United States; 1856	Succeeded by Hannibal Hamlin
Legal offices
Preceded by Richard Thompson	Attorney General of New Jersey; 1857–1861	Succeeded by Frederick Frelinghuysen
Diplomatic posts
Preceded by Charles J. Faulkner	United States Minister to France; 1861–1864	Succeeded by John Bigelow
