= James J. Wilson =

American politician (1775–1824)

James Jefferson Wilson

United States Senator from New Jersey
- In office March 4, 1815 – January 8, 1821
- Preceded by: John Lambert
- Succeeded by: Samuel L. Southard

Member of the New Jersey General Assembly
- In office 1804

Personal details
- Born: 1775 Essex County, New Jersey
- Died: July 28, 1824 (aged 48–49) Trenton, New Jersey, US
- Party: Democratic-Republican

James Jefferson Wilson (1775 – July 28, 1824) was a U.S. senator from New Jersey from 1815 to 1821.

== Biography ==
Wilson was born in Essex County, New Jersey, where he attended the common schools. He was editor and publisher of the True American of Trenton, New Jersey 1801–1824; clerk in the New Jersey General Assembly in 1804; judge advocate and captain, Hunterdon Brigade, New Jersey Militia, in 1806; surrogate of Hunterdon County, New Jersey in 1808; member of the General Assembly 1809–1811; brigadier general and Adjutant General of New Jersey from 1810–1812, and reappointed in 1814; captain in the Third Regiment, Hunterdon Brigade 1814; captain in the New Jersey Militia 1814; brigadier general and Quartermaster General of New Jersey from 1821 to 1824.

Wilson was elected as a Democratic-Republican to the United States Senate and served from March 4, 1815, to January 8, 1821, when he resigned; was an unsuccessful candidate for reelection; chairman of the Committee on Post Office and Post Roads (Fourteenth and Fifteenth Congresses), Committee on Claims (Sixteenth Congress); appointed Postmaster of Trenton, New Jersey, in 1821 and served until his death in that city; interment in the First Baptist Church Cemetery, Trenton.

== Bibliography ==
- Wilson, James Jefferson, comp. A National Song-Book, Being a Collection of Patriotic, Martial, and Naval Songs and Odes. Trenton, N.J.: James J. Wilson, 1813.

U.S. Senate
| Preceded by John Lambert | U.S. senator (Class 1) from New Jersey; 1815–1821; Served alongside: John Condit, Mahlon Dickerson | Succeeded by Samuel L. Southard |
