= 1829 Connecticut lieutenant gubernatorial election =

- April 9, 1829
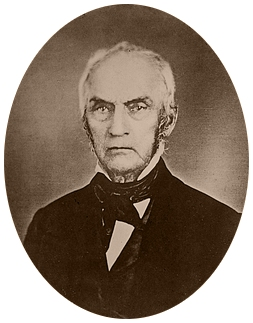

Nominee	John Samuel Peters	William J. Williams
Party	National Republican	Independent
Popular vote	5,199	2,545
Percentage	64.80%	31.70%
Lieutenant Governor before election
John Samuel Peters
National Republican
Elected Lieutenant Governor
John Samuel Peters
National Republican

The 1829 Connecticut lieutenant gubernatorial election was held on April 9, 1829, in order to elect the lieutenant governor of Connecticut. Incumbent National Republican lieutenant governor John Samuel Peters won re-election against Independent candidate William J. Williams and several others.

== General election ==
On election day, April 9, 1829, incumbent National Republican lieutenant governor John Samuel Peters won re-election with 64.80% of the vote, thereby retaining National Republican control over the office of lieutenant governor. Peters was sworn in for his third term on May 6, 1829.

=== Results ===
Connecticut lieutenant gubernatorial election, 1829
Party	Candidate	Votes	%
National Republican	John Samuel Peters (incumbent)	5,199	64.80
Independent	William J. Williams	2,545	31.70
	Scattering	276	3.50
Total votes		8,020	100.00
National Republican hold			
