= Peter D. Vroom (U.S. Army officer) =

U.S. Army brigadier general

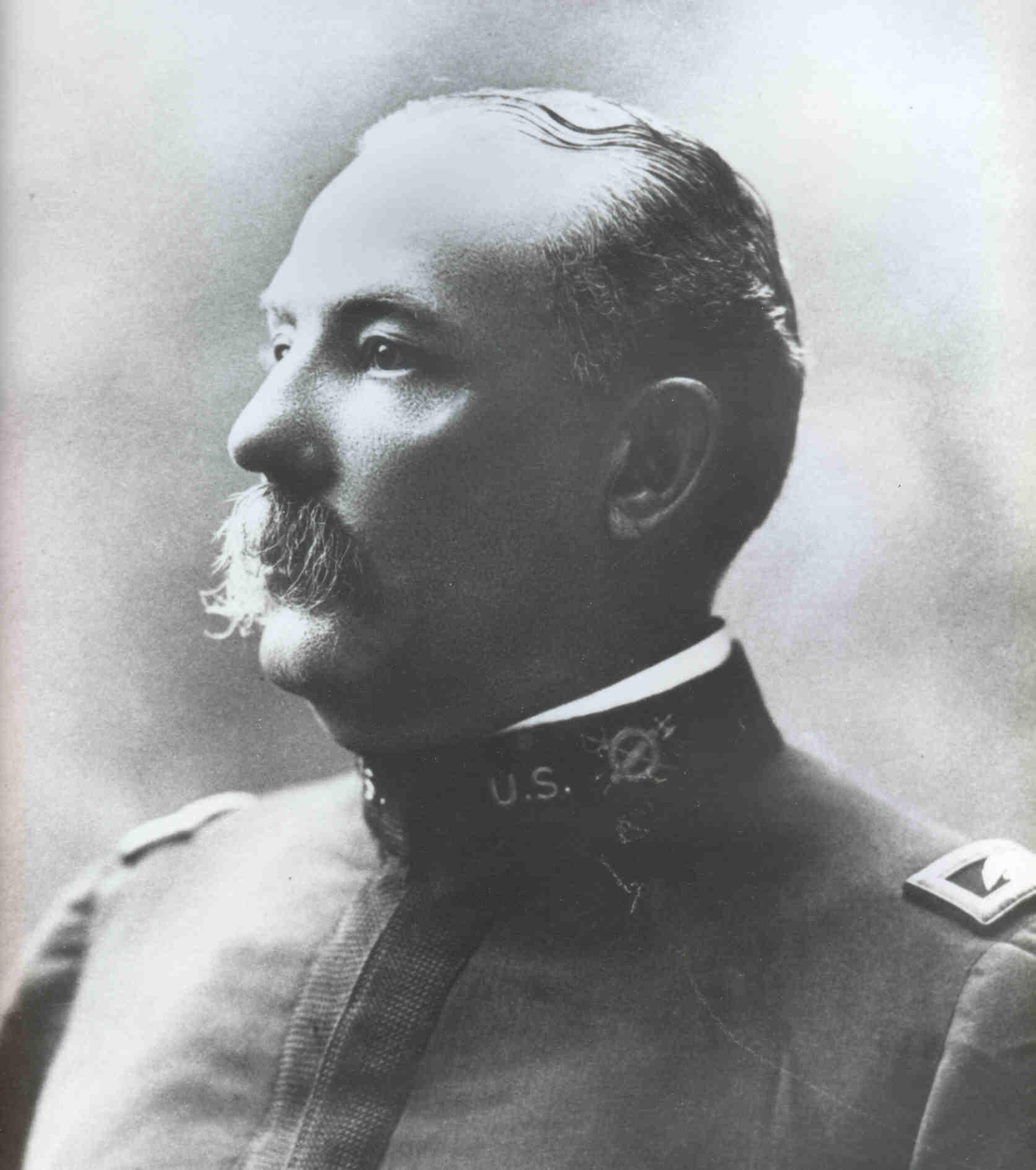
- Vroom, c. 1903
- Born: April 18, 1842; Trenton, New Jersey, U.S.
- Died: March 19, 1926 (aged 83); Atlantic City, New Jersey, U.S.
- Burial place: Arlington National Cemetery
- Alma mater: Rensselaer Polytechnic Institute
- Spouse: Margaret Emily Wood (m. 1893–1901, her death)
- Relatives: Peter Dumont Vroom (father); Garret D. Wall (grandfather)
- Military career
- Allegiance: Union (American Civil War); United States
- Branch: U.S. Army Cavalry Branch
- Service years: 1862–1866 (Union); 1866–1903 (Army)
- Rank: Brigadier General
- Unit: Office of the Inspector General of the United States Army
- Commands: Troop L, 3rd Cavalry Regiment; Fort Robinson; Inspector General of the United States Army
- Conflicts: American Civil War; Battle of South Mountain; Battle of Fredericksburg; Battle of Gettysburg; American Indian Wars; Great Sioux War of 1876; Battle of the Rosebud; Spanish–American War; Philippine–American War

Peter D. Vroom (April 18, 1842 – March 19, 1926) was a career officer in the United States Army. A veteran of the American Civil War, American Indian Wars, and Spanish–American War, he served from 1862 to 1903, attained the rank of brigadier general, and was most notable for his service as Inspector General of the United States Army.

== Biography ==
Peter Dumont Vroom was born in Trenton, New Jersey on April 18, 1842, a son of Peter Dumont Vroom and Maria Matilda (Wall) Vroom. Garret D. Wall was his maternal grandfather. Vroom was educated in Trenton and graduated from Rensselaer Polytechnic Institute in 1862 with a civil engineering (CE) degree. Contemporary news accounts described Vroom as noticeably handsome, with one stating that at six feet four inches and generously proportioned, he was one of the army's most distinguished looking men.

== Start of career ==
In August 1862, Vroom joined the Union Army for the American Civil War and received his commission as a first lieutenant in the 1st New Jersey Infantry Regiment. He was wounded at the September 1862 Battle of South Mountain, and participated in the December 1862 Battle of Fredericksburg and July 1863 Battle of Gettysburg. In September 1863, he was commissioned as a major in the 2nd New Jersey Cavalry Regiment. At the end of the war, Vroom was serving as inspector of the XVI Corps Cavalry force commanded by Benjamin Grierson in Mississippi. In November 1867, he received promotion to lieutenant colonel by brevet in recognition of his superior wartime service. In December 1867, he received brevet promotion to colonel.

== Continued career ==
Vroom was discharged from the Union Army in April 1866 and was appointed in the regular army as a second lieutenant in the 3rd Cavalry Regiment. He was promoted to first lieutenant in July 1866 and served throughout the western United States during the American Indian Wars. He received promotion to captain in May 1876 and participated in the June 1876 Battle of the Rosebud as commander of the 3rd Cavalry's Troop L. In the late 1870s, Vroom was commander of the post at Fort Robinson, Nebraska.

In the 1880s, Vroom was transferred to Inspector General duties, and he was promoted to major in December 1888. His subsequent inspector general postings included the Department of the Platte, Department of the Missouri, Department of the East, and Department of Texas. In 1890, Vroom was assigned to temporary duty in the office of the Army's Inspector General, and carried out inspections of the military departments at Maryland Agricultural College, St. John's College, Delaware College, and Pennsylvania Military Academy.

Vroom married Margaret Emily Wood (1867–1901), the daughter of Brigadier General Palmer Gaylord Wood, and he was promoted to lieutenant colonel in 1895. During the Spanish–American War, he served in Puerto Rico as inspector general of the force commanded by Nelson A. Miles. He contracted malaria during the war, and after convalescence was again assigned as inspector general of the Department of the East.

== Later career ==
Vroom was promoted to colonel in January 1900, and in July 1902 he was assigned as inspector general of the Philippine Division during the Philippine–American War. An issue of seniority arose when Inspector General of the U.S. Army Joseph Cabell Breckinridge Sr. was scheduled to retire in April 1903; Vroom was second in seniority to George H. Burton within the Inspector general's office, but had more time in grade as a colonel. The issue was resolved when Vroom agreed to accept promotion to brigadier general, then immediately retire. On April 12, he was promoted and assigned as the army's Inspector General while en route from the Philippines. He retired the same day, and Burton was appointed to succeed him.

Vroom died in Atlantic City, New Jersey on March 19, 1926. He was buried at Arlington National Cemetery.
