= Samuel L. Southard =

American statesman (1787–1842)

Samuel Lewis Southard
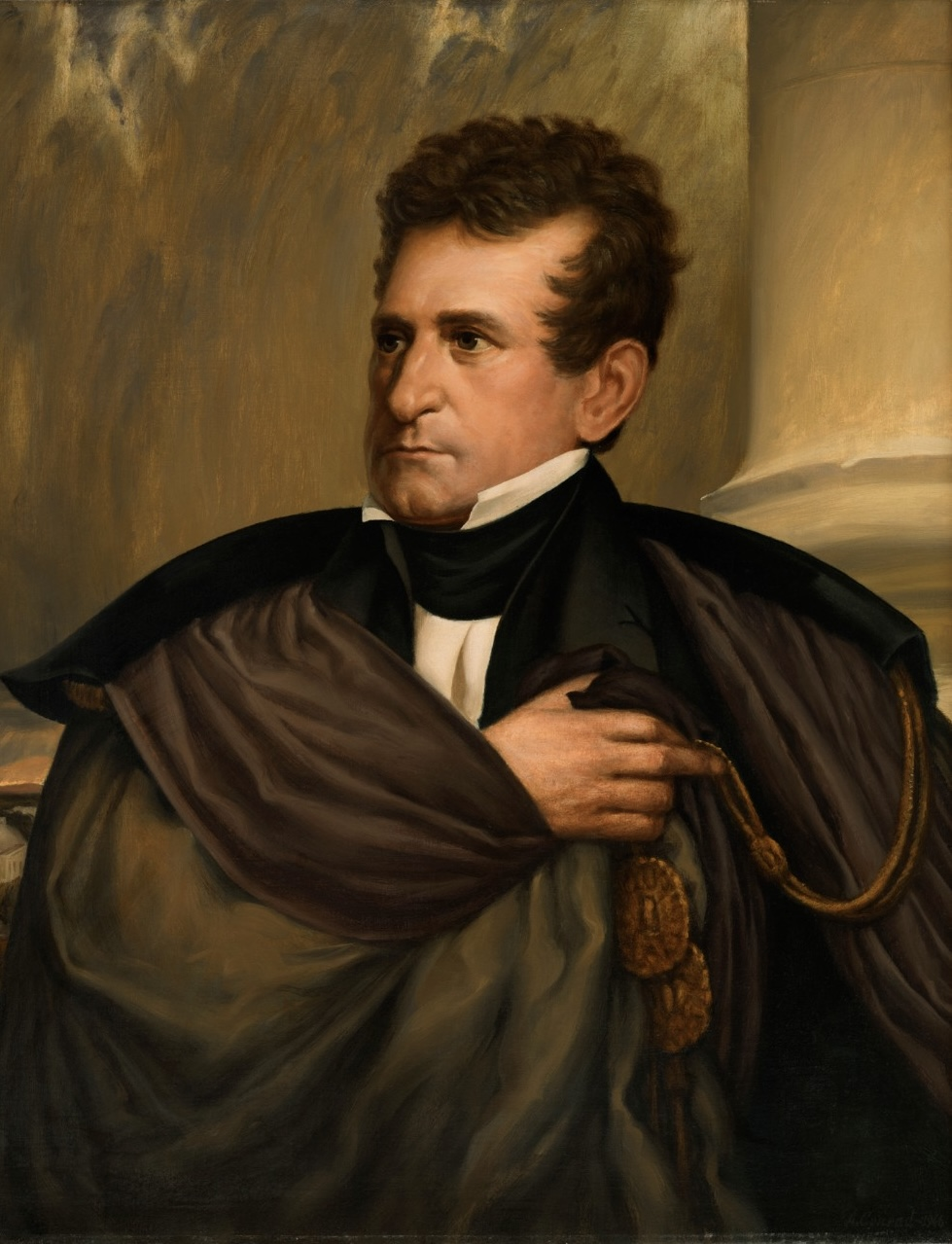

President pro tempore of the United States Senate
- In office March 11, 1841 – May 31, 1842
- Preceded by: William R. King
- Succeeded by: Willie Person Mangum

United States Senator from New Jersey
- In office March 4, 1833 – June 26, 1842
- Preceded by: Mahlon Dickerson
- Succeeded by: William L. Dayton
- In office January 26, 1821 – March 3, 1823
- Preceded by: James J. Wilson
- Succeeded by: Joseph McIlvaine

10th Governor of New Jersey
- In office October 26, 1832 – February 27, 1833
- Preceded by: Peter Dumont Vroom
- Succeeded by: Elias P. Seeley

New Jersey Attorney General
- In office 1829-1833
- Preceded by: Theodore Frelinghuysen
- Succeeded by: John Moore White

7th United States Secretary of the Navy
- In office September 16, 1823 – March 4, 1829
- President: James Monroe; John Quincy Adams
- Preceded by: Smith Thompson
- Succeeded by: John Branch

Personal details
- Born: Samuel Lewis Southard; June 9, 1787 Basking Ridge, New Jersey, U.S.
- Died: June 26, 1842 (aged 55) Fredericksburg, Virginia, U.S.
- Resting place: Congressional Cemetery
- Party: Democratic-Republican (Before 1825); National Republican (1825–1834); Whig (1834–1842)
- Spouse: Rebecca Harrow
- Education: Princeton University (BA)

Samuel Lewis Southard (June 9, 1787 – June 26, 1842) was an American statesman of the early 19th century, serving as a U.S. senator, secretary of the Navy, and the tenth governor of New Jersey. He also served as president pro tempore of the Senate, and was briefly first in the presidential line of succession due to concurrent vacancies in the offices of vice president and speaker of the House.

== Biography ==
The son of Henry Southard and Sarah (Lewis) Southard, Henry was born in the Basking Ridge section of Bernards Township, New Jersey, on June 9, 1787. Southard's ancestors included Anthony Janszoon van Salee, one of the earliest settlers of New Amsterdam (of partial Moorish descent), and his siblings included Isaac Southard. Southard attended the Brick Academy classical school and graduated from Princeton University in 1804.

=== Early career ===
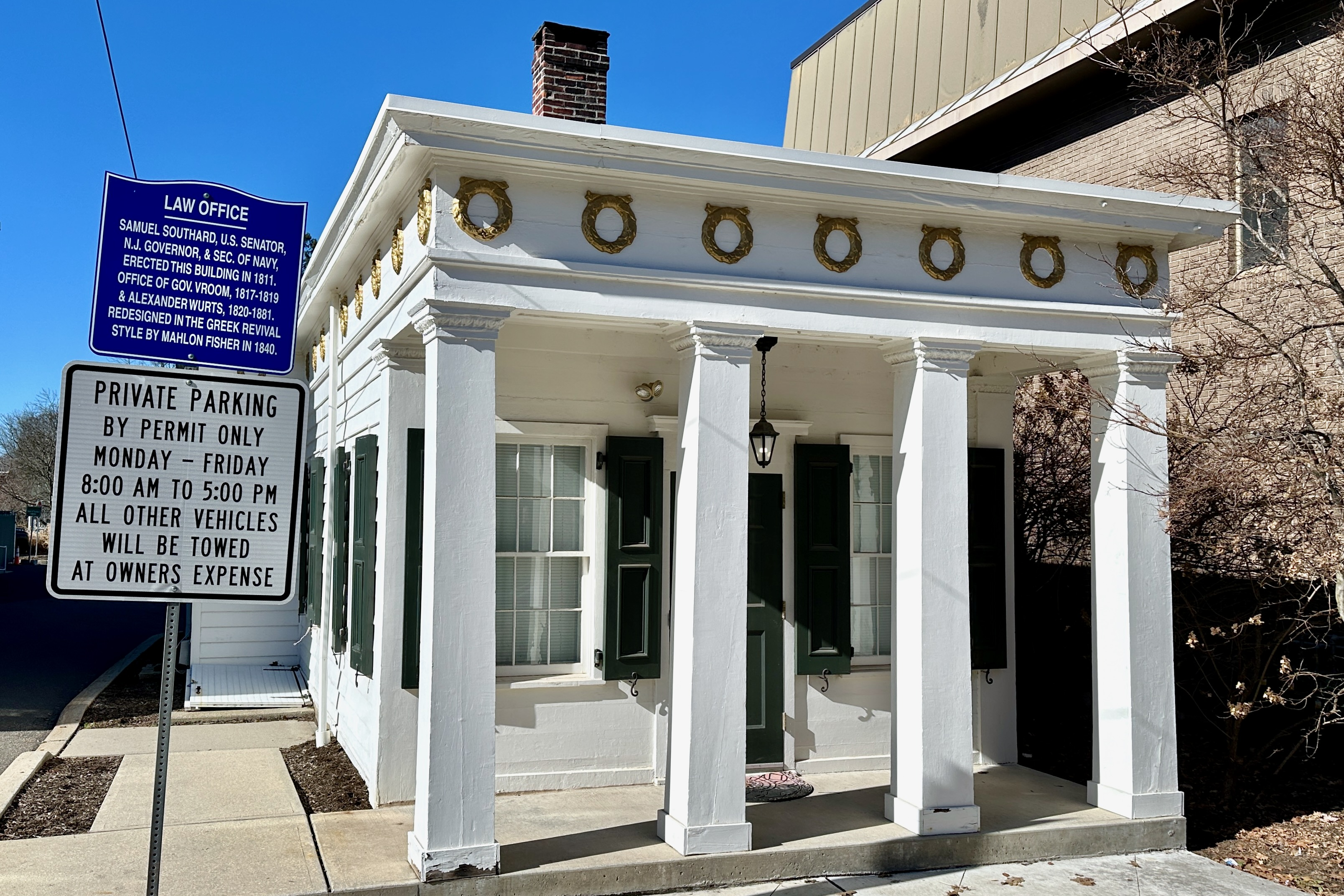
Law office built by Southard in Flemington, New Jersey, in 1811

After teaching in New Jersey, he worked for several years as a tutor in the Virginia home of John Taliaferro, his father's congressional colleague. While living in Virginia, Southard studied law with Francis T. Brooke and Judge Williams, both of Fredericksburg. Upon being admitted to the bar, he returned to New Jersey, and started his practice in Flemington in 1811. He was appointed law reporter by the New Jersey Legislature in 1814. Elected to the New Jersey General Assembly in 1815, Southard was appointed to the New Jersey Supreme Court to succeed Mahlon Dickerson shortly thereafter, and in 1820 served as a presidential elector. He was elected to a seat in the United States Senate over James J. Wilson, and was appointed to the remainder of Wilson's term After Wilson resigned. Southard served in office from January 26, 1821, to March 3, 1823, when he resigned. During this time, he was a member of the committee that produced the Missouri Compromise.

=== Navy career ===
President James Monroe selected Senator Southard to be Secretary of the Navy in September 1823, and he remained in office under President John Quincy Adams. During these years, he also served briefly as ad interim Secretary of the Treasury (1825) and Secretary of War (1828). Southard proved to be one of the most effective of the Navy's early Secretaries. He endeavored to enlarge the Navy and improve its administration, purchased land for the first Naval Hospitals, began construction of the first Navy dry docks, undertook surveys of U.S. coastal waters and promoted exploration in the Pacific Ocean. Responding to actions by influential officers, including David Porter, he reinforced the American tradition of civilian control over the military establishment. Also on Southard's watch, the Navy grew by some 50% in personnel and expenditures and expanded its reach into waters that had not previously seen an American man-of-war.

=== Political life ===
In 1829 Southard became New Jersey Attorney General, succeeding Theodore Frelinghuysen. In 1832, the state legislature elected him Governor over Peter D. Vroom by a vote of 40 to 24. In 1833, he was again elected to the U.S. Senate. During the next decade, he was a leader of the Whig Party and attained national prominence as chairman of the Committee on Naval Affairs. As President pro tempore of the Senate, he was first in the presidential line of succession after the death of William Henry Harrison and the accession of Vice President John Tyler to the presidency.

Failing health forced Southard to resign from the Senate in 1842.

=== Societies ===
During the 1820s, Southard was a member of the prestigious society, Columbian Institute for the Promotion of Arts and Sciences, who counted among their members former presidents Andrew Jackson and John Quincy Adams and many prominent men of the day, including well-known representatives of the military, government service, medical and other professions. In 1839, he was elected to the American Philosophical Society.

== Death and burial ==
He died in Fredericksburg, Virginia, on June 26, 1842. Southard was buried in Washington's Congressional Cemetery.

== Legacy ==
The destroyer USS Southard (DD-207), (later DMS-10), 1919–1946, was named in his honor. There is also a public park in Basking Ridge, New Jersey, named after him. There is also a street named after him in Key West, FL as well as Southard Street in Trenton, New Jersey.

== See also ==
- List of members of the United States Congress who died in office (1790–1899)

== Sources ==
- Dictionary of American Biography.
- Birkner, Michael. Samuel L. Southard: Jeffersonian Whig. Rutherford, N.J.: Fairleigh Dickinson University Press, 1984.
- Ershkowitz, Herbert. Samuel L. Southard: A Case Study of Whig Leadership in the Age of Jackson. New Jersey History 88 (Spring 1970): 5-24.
- "Samuel L. Southard Papers (1783-1893),(bulk 1802-1846), Finding Aid C0250", consisting of 170 boxes and 73.6 lineal feet of original documents of financial and personal affairs, including correspondence from Charles Muir Campbell of Princeton, NJ. Most boxes are organized by year and subject. Access to these documents is via Princeton University Library, Department of Rare Books and Special Collections, Manuscripts Division.

U.S. Senate
Preceded by James J. Wilson	U.S. Senator (Class 1) from New Jersey; 1821–1823; Served alongside: Mahlon Dickerson	Succeeded by Joseph McIlvaine
Preceded by Mahlon Dickerson	U.S. Senator (Class 1) from New Jersey; 1833–1842; Served alongside: Theodore Frelinghuysen, Garret D. Wall, Jacob W. Miller	Succeeded by William L. Dayton
Preceded by George M. Dallas	Chair of the Senate Naval Affairs Committee; 1833–1836	Succeeded by William Cabell Rives
Political offices
Preceded by Smith Thompson	United States Secretary of the Navy; 1823–1829	Succeeded by John Branch
Preceded by Peter Dumont Vroom	Governor of New Jersey; 1832–1833	Succeeded by Elias P. Seeley
Preceded by William R. King	President pro tempore of the United States Senate; 1841–1842	Succeeded by Willie Person Mangum
Legal offices
Preceded by Theodore Frelinghuysen	Attorney General of New Jersey; 1829–1833	Succeeded by John Moore White
