= John Lambert (politician) =

American politician from New Jersey (1746–1823)

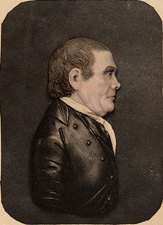

United States Senator from New Jersey
- In office March 4, 1809 – March 3, 1815
- Preceded by: John Condit
- Succeeded by: James J. Wilson

Acting Governor of New Jersey
- In office October 28, 1802 – October 29, 1803
- Preceded by: Joseph Bloomfield as Governor
- Succeeded by: Joseph Bloomfield as Governor

Member of the U.S. House of Representatives from New Jersey's at-large congressional district
- In office March 4, 1805 – March 3, 1809
- Preceded by: James Mott
- Succeeded by: James Cox

Personal details
- Born: February 24, 1746 Amwell Township, Province of New Jersey, British America (located in modern Lambertville, New Jersey)
- Died: February 4, 1823 (aged 76) Lambertville, New Jersey, U.S.
- Party: Democratic-Republican

John Lambert (February 24, 1746 – February 4, 1823), was a New Jersey politician who served as a Representative, a U.S. Senator and as acting governor of New Jersey.

== Early life ==
Born in Amwell Township in the Province of New Jersey (in what is today known as Lambertville, New Jersey), he pursued an academic course and engaged in agricultural pursuits.

== Politics ==
Lambert was a member of the New Jersey General Assembly from 1780 to 1785, and in 1788. He was a member of the New Jersey Legislative Council from 1790 to 1804, and served as vice president from 1801 to 1804. Lambert was the Acting Governor of New Jersey in 1802 and 1803, serving in 1802 due to a deadlocked vote in the gubernatorial election. He was elected as a Democratic-Republican to the Ninth United States Congress and Tenth United States Congress, serving in office from March 4, 1805, to March 3, 1809. Lambert was elected to the United States Senate and served a single term, from March 4, 1809, to March 3, 1815. On June 17, 1812, he voted against war with Britain.

What is now the city of Lambertville, New Jersey was named in his honor in 1814 when the community's first post office was established.

Lambert owned and managed a plantation. He was an avid reader, and was known for owning one of the most esteemed libraries in Hunterdon County,

== Death ==
Lambert died near Lambertville, and was interred in Barber's Burying Ground, Delaware Township, Hunterdon County, New Jersey.

Political offices
Preceded by Joseph Bloomfield; Governor	Acting Governor of New Jersey; 1802–1803	Succeeded by Joseph Bloomfield; Governor
U.S. House of Representatives
Preceded by James Mott	Member of the U.S. House of Representatives from New Jersey's at-large congressional district March 4, 1805 – March 3, 1809	Succeeded by James Cox
U.S. Senate
Preceded by John Condit	U.S. senator (Class 1) from New Jersey; 1809–1815; Served alongside: Aaron Kitchell, John Condit	Succeeded by James J. Wilson
