= Elias P. Seeley =

American politician (1791–1846)

Elias Petty Seeley
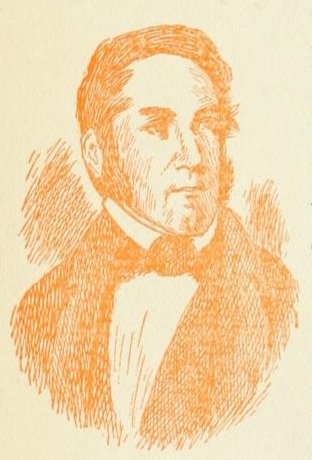

11th Governor of New Jersey
- In office February 27, 1833 – October 23, 1833
- Preceded by: Samuel L. Southard
- Succeeded by: Peter Dumont Vroom

Personal details
- Born: November 10, 1791; Bridgeton, New Jersey
- Died: August 23, 1846 (aged 54); Trenton, New Jersey
- Political party: Whig
- Spouse: Jane E. Champney

Elias Petty Seeley (November 10, 1791 in Bridgeton, New Jersey – August 23, 1846) was an American Whig Party politician who served as the 11th governor of New Jersey in 1833.

== Politics ==
Seeley was named to serve as governor after Samuel L. Southard stepped down from office to take a seat in the United States Senate. Seeley represented Cumberland County in the New Jersey Legislative Council from 1829 through 1833.

== Death ==
Seeley died on August 23, 1846, and was interred in Old Broad Street Presbyterian Church Cemetery in Bridgeton, New Jersey.

== See also ==
- List of governors of New Jersey

Political offices
Preceded by Samuel L. Southard	Governor of New Jersey; February 27, 1833 – October 23, 1833	Succeeded by Peter Dumont Vroom
