= United Hospital Fund =

United Hospital Fund of New York
- Founded: 1879
- Type: non profit
- Location: New York City
- Key people: Oxiris Barbot, President; George Macculloch Miller (First President)
- Endowment: $117 million
- Website: www.uhfnyc.org

The United Hospital Fund of New York (UHF) is a nonprofit organization that focuses on improving health care in New York. It conducts health policy research and supports numerous health care initiatives through fundraising, grant-making, and collaboration with other health care organizations. Since August 2017, the organization is led by Oxiris Barbot.

== Founding and early program history ==
The United Hospital Fund was founded as a charitable organization in 1879, raising money for New York hospitals that provided health care for people who could not otherwise afford it. Originally called the Hospital Saturday and Sunday Association of New York City, it was formed "to obtain benevolent gifts for the hospitals of New York... and to provide for distributing these gifts... among such hospitals." Its first president was George Macculloch Miller. The organization changed its name to the United Hospital Fund of New York in 1916.

In 1935, the Fund established the Associated Hospital Service of New York (AHS), which later became Blue Cross and Blue Shield of Greater New York. It also helped found organizations that became the Greater New York Hospital Association (1904), United Way of New York City (1938), and the New York Blood Center (1956).

== Recent research and notable activities ==
In accordance with its mission, the Fund's research, policy analysis, and grant-making focus on health care and health equity, primarily in New York. Its research addresses health insurance coverage, health care quality, and patient safety. It is committed to reorienting health care services toward the needs of particular populations: the aging, people with HIV/AIDS, the chronically ill, and family caregivers.

Since 2005, the Medicaid Institute at United Hospital Fund has published numerous reports and studies exploring ways to improve New York's Medicaid program. Separately, the Fund's health insurance project has published a series of reports on the logistical and policy implications of setting up a health insurance exchange in the state following the passage of the Affordable Care Act.

Working with the Greater New York Hospital Association, the Fund has led and participated in numerous efforts focused on quality improvement and patient safety at New York hospitals. These initiatives have led to lower incidence of central-line associated bloodstream infections and cardiac arrest, as well as lower mortality rates from severe sepsis.

The Fund's Aging in Place initiative, begun in 2000, explores ways to provide health care and social services to seniors in their homes and communities, particularly in naturally occurring retirement communities (NORCs). In 2008, the Fund set up the Next Step in Care campaign, which provides informational resources for family caregivers and works to build effective partnerships between caregivers and health care providers and professionals.

Following the events of September 11, the Fund allocated $1 million to an initiative focused on Disaster Relief Medicaid, which helped get temporary health insurance coverage to 340,000 New Yorkers.

The Fund hosts an annual gala to recognize those who are making notable contributions to improving health care.

Between 2019 and 2024, the Fund awarded $2.6 million in grants.
