= Garret D. Wall =

American judge (1783-1850)

Garret Dorset Wall
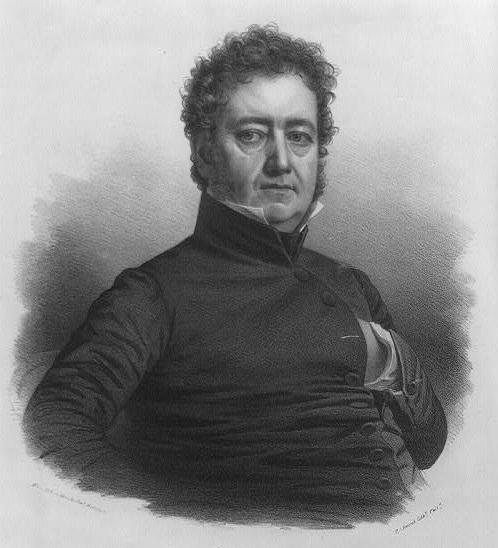

United States Senator from New Jersey
- In office March 4, 1835 – March 3, 1841
- Preceded by: Theodore Frelinghuysen
- Succeeded by: Jacob W. Miller

United States Attorney for the District of New Jersey
- In office 1829–1835
- President: Andrew Jackson
- Preceded by: Lucius Elmer
- Succeeded by: James S. Green

Member of the New Jersey General Assembly
- In office 1827

Personal details
- Born: March 10, 1783 Middletown Township, New Jersey, U.S.
- Died: November 22, 1850 (aged 67) Burlington, New Jersey, U.S.
- Party: Democratic-Republican, Democrat
- Profession: Politician, Lawyer, Judge

Garret Dorset Wall (March 10, 1783 – November 22, 1850) was a military officer and Senator from New Jersey. He was elected as governor of New Jersey, but refused to assume office.

== Early career ==
Born in Middletown Township, he completed preparatory studies, studied law, was licensed as an attorney in 1804 and as a counselor in 1807, and commenced practice in Burlington, New Jersey. He served in the War of 1812 and commanded a volunteer regiment from Trenton.

== Politics ==
He was clerk of the New Jersey Supreme Court from 1812 to 1817, and was Quartermaster General of New Jersey from 1815 to 1837. He was a member of the New Jersey General Assembly in 1827 and was U.S. Attorney for the District of New Jersey in 1829; Wall was elected Governor of New Jersey in 1829, but declined to serve; he was then elected as a Jacksonian (later, a Democrat) to the U.S. Senate and served from March 4, 1835, to March 3, 1841; he was an unsuccessful candidate for reelection. While in the Senate, he was chairman of the Committee on the Militia (Twenty-fourth and Twenty-fifth Congresses) and a member of the Committees on the Judiciary (Twenty-fifth and Twenty-sixth Congresses) and Military Affairs (Twenty-fifth Congress).

Wall was a judge of the New Jersey Court of Errors and Appeals of New Jersey from 1848 until his death in Burlington in 1850. He was buried in Saint Mary's Episcopal Churchyard in Burlington.

== Relatives ==
Garret D. Wall was the father of James Walter Wall, also a U.S. Senator from New Jersey. His daughter Maria Matilda Wall was the wife of Peter Dumont Vroom and mother of Peter D. Vroom.

== Legacy ==
Wall Township, New Jersey is named in his honor.

U.S. Senate
Preceded by Theodore Frelinghuysen	U.S. senator (Class 2) from New Jersey; March 4, 1835 – March 3, 1841; Served alongside: Samuel L. Southard	Succeeded by Jacob W. Miller
