= 1829–30 Serbian parliamentary election =

Parliamentary elections were held in Serbia in 1829 and 1830 to elect members of the Grand National Assembly. It was the first National Assembly whose members were elected by its citizens.

== Background ==
Following the Russian victory in the Russo-Turkish War of 1828–29, the Russian and Ottoman Empire signed the Treaty of Adrianople in September 1829. One element of this was the granting of autonomy to the Ottoman-controlled Principality of Serbia.

On 15 and 17 November Prince Miloš issued an order to carry out elections for Grand National Assembly that would convene in Kragujevac on 24 January 1830.

The elections were held in each nahiyah on different days, with the local Nahi elders determining the electoral date.

== Aftermath ==
The new Assembly convened on the morning of 24 January and was held in an open field next to the church in Kragujevac. Miloš read out the hatt-i humayun of 1829, which confirmed the outcome of the Treaty of Adrianople and the establishment of Serbian autonomy. It remained in session until 28 January.

== Sources ==
- Bataković, Dušan T. (2014). The Foreign Policy of Serbia (1844-1867): Ilija Garašanin's Načertanije. Institute for Balkan Studies. ISBN 9788671790895.
- Mitrinović, Čedomil; Brašić, Miloš N. (1937). Jugoslovenske narodne skupštine i sabori [Yugoslavian National Assemblies and Parliaments] (in Serbo-Croatian). pp. 28–29.
