= Jacob W. Miller =

American politician (1800–1862)

Jacob Welsh Miller
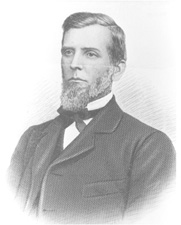

United States Senator from New Jersey
- In office March 4, 1841 – March 3, 1853
- Preceded by: Garret D. Wall
- Succeeded by: William Wright

Member of the New Jersey Senate
- In office 1839–1840

Personal details
- Born: August 29, 1800 Washington Township, New Jersey, U.S.
- Died: September 30, 1862 (aged 62) Morristown, New Jersey, U.S.
- Party: Whig
- Children: George Macculloch Miller

Jacob Welsh Miller (August 29, 1800 – September 30, 1862) was a United States senator from New Jersey.

== Early life ==
In 1800, Miller was born in the German Valley section of Washington Township, Morris County, New Jersey, United States. He was admitted to the bar in 1823, and practiced in Morristown.

== Career ==
In 1832, Miller was elected to the New Jersey General Assembly. From 1839 to 1840, he then represented Morris County in the New Jersey Legislative Council (now the New Jersey Senate).

In 1839, Miller was elected as a Whig to the state Senate, and to the U.S. Senate in 1841. He was reelected in 1847, and served from March 4, 1841, to March 3, 1853. While in the Senate, he was chairman of the committee on the District of Columbia (Twenty-seventh and Twenty-eighth Congresses).

He joined the Republican Party in 1855.

== Personal life ==
In 1825, Miller married Mary Louisa Macculloch, the daughter of George P. Macculloch, a wealthy Morristown engineer and businessman who had designed and built the Morris Canal. They had nine children, including attorney George Macculloch Miller, and Captain Lindley Miller, who served as an officer of a black infantry regiment during the Civil War and wrote "Marching Song of the First Arkansas".

In 1862, Miller died in Morristown, New Jersey. He was interred in St. Peter's Parish Churchyard.

== Bibliography ==
- United States Congress. "Jacob W. Miller (id: M000731)". Biographical Directory of the United States Congress.
- Macculloch-Miller Family Archives, Macculloch Hall Historical Museum, Morristown, NJ.

U.S. Senate
Preceded by Garret D. Wall	U.S. senator (Class 2) from New Jersey; 1841–1853; Served alongside: Samuel L. Southard, William L. Dayton, Robert F. Stockton	Succeeded by William Wright
