= Isaac Halstead Williamson =

American politician (1767–1844)

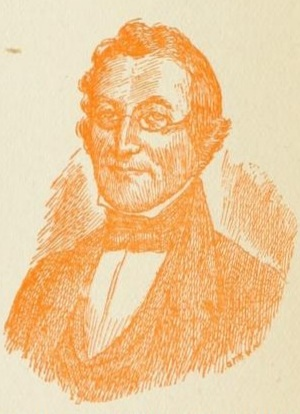

8th Governor of New Jersey
- In office February 6, 1817 – October 30, 1829
- Preceded by: Mahlon Dickerson
- Succeeded by: Peter Dumont Vroom

Personal details
- Born: September 27, 1767 Elizabethtown, Province of New Jersey, British America
- Died: July 10, 1844 (aged 76) Elizabethtown, New Jersey, U.S.
- Spouse: Anne Crossdale Jouet (1777–1853)
- Children: 2

Isaac Halstead Williamson (September 27, 1767 – July 10, 1844) was an American lawyer, jurist, and politician who served two terms as the eighth governor of New Jersey, from 1817 to 1829.

== Early life and education ==
Isaac Halstead Williamson was born in 1767 in Elizabethtown in the Province of New Jersey. He later studied law with his brother Matthias and became a leading lawyer in New Jersey.

== Early career ==
He received his attorney's license in 1791, followed by his counselor's license five years later, and in 1804, he was called to be a sergeant-at-law. In 1808, he married Anne Crossdale Jouet (1777–1853), and together they had two sons, Benjamin in 1809 and Isaac Halstead in 1811. In 1815, without knowledge that his name was on the ticket, Isaac was elected as the Democratic representative for Essex County.

== Governor ==
Two years later he was elected Governor of New Jersey and was re-elected every year from 1818 to 1829. As part of his duties as governor, Williamson served as the judge of the Prerogative Court of New Jersey. Williamson was Mayor of Elizabethtown, New Jersey from 1830 to 1833. In 1831 and 1832, he was elected to represent Essex County as a member of the New Jersey Legislative Council (now known as the New Jersey Senate).

Despite holding these political offices, Williamson continued to practice law. In 1844, he was unanimously elected to be President of the convention that framed the revised New Jersey State Constitution. However, he had to relinquish this position due to poor health.

=== Death ===
By the end of the year, he died in Elizabethtown. His collection of the Chinese Export Armorial Porcelain dinnerware that belonged to his wife's family and bears the Jouet coat-of-arms is archived at the New Hope, Pennsylvania Historical Society.

Political offices
Preceded by Mahlon Dickerson	Governor of New Jersey; February 6, 1817 – October 30, 1829	Succeeded by Peter Dumont Vroom
