= Peter D. Vroom =

American politician (1791–1873)

Peter Dumont Vroom
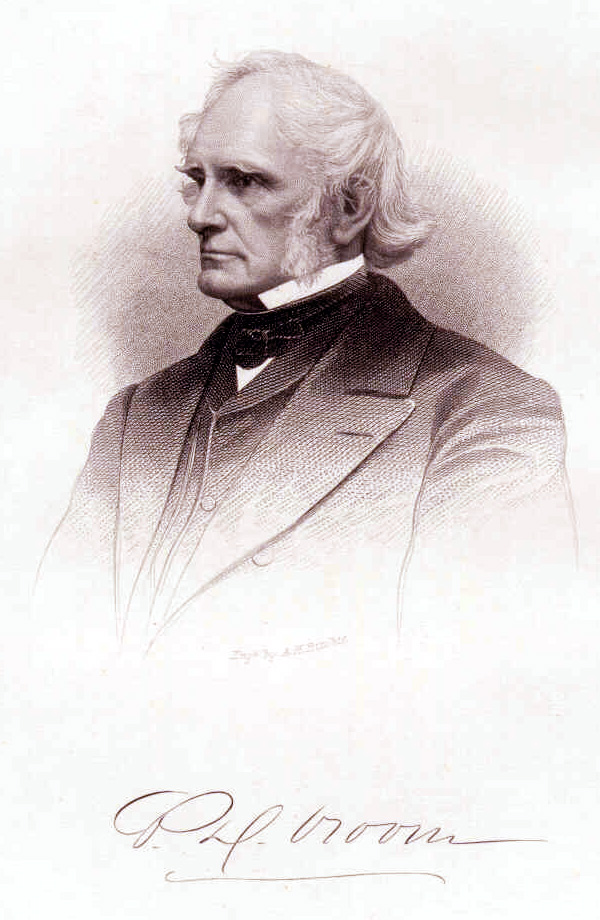

9th Governor of New Jersey
- In office November 6, 1829 – October 26, 1832
- Preceded by: Isaac Halstead Williamson
- Succeeded by: Samuel L. Southard
- In office October 25, 1833 – October 28, 1836
- Preceded by: Elias P. Seeley
- Succeeded by: Philemon Dickerson

Member of the U.S. House of Representatives from New Jersey's at-large congressional district
- In office March 4, 1839 – March 3, 1841
- Preceded by: Thomas J. Yorke
- Succeeded by: Thomas J. Yorke

Member of the New Jersey General Assembly
- In office 1826–1829

Personal details
- Born: December 12, 1791 Hillsborough Township, New Jersey, US
- Died: November 18, 1873 (aged 81) Trenton, New Jersey, US
- Party: Democratic
- Spouse(s): Anna Dumont; Maria Matilda Wall
- Children: 11 (including Peter D. Vroom)

Peter Dumont Vroom (December 12, 1791 – November 18, 1873), an American Democratic Party politician, served as the ninth governor of New Jersey (serving two terms in office; from 1829–1832 and 1833–1836) and as a member of the United States House of Representatives for a single term, from 1839 to 1841.

== Early life ==
He was born in Hillsborough Township, New Jersey, the son of Col. Peter Dumont Vroom (d.1831) who represented Somerset County as an Assemblyman (1790–91, 1794–96, and 1811–13) and in the Legislative Council from 1798 to 1804 as a Federalist. The younger Vroom graduated from Columbia College, New York in 1808. At Columbia, Peter Dumont Vroom was a member of the Philolexian Society. After studying law at Somerville Academy he was admitted to the bar in 1813.

== Politics ==
=== Governorship of New Jersey ===
Vroom was a member of the New Jersey General Assembly from 1826 to 1829. He then served as governor of New Jersey from 1829 to 1832 and 1833 to 1836. As governor, Vroom supported the establishment of the Camden and Amboy Railroad and the Delaware and Raritan Canal.

=== Congress ===
In 1838, Vroom was one of five Democratic candidates for Congress to become involved in the Broad Seal War controversy. Disputed election results caused the U.S. House of Representatives to challenge the Whig candidates certified by Governor William Pennington. After a lengthy fight, Vroom and the four other Democrats were seated in place of the Whigs. Vroom lost his bid for reelection in 1840.

=== Ministership ===
He then served as a delegate to the New Jersey State Constitutional Convention in 1844. He was appointed by President Franklin Pierce as United States Minister to Prussia from November 4, 1853, through August 10, 1857.

== Death and legacy ==
Vroom died in Trenton, New Jersey, and was buried in the Dumont Burying Ground off River Road in Hillsborough Township, New Jersey. Vroom Street in Trenton is named in his honor.

Political offices
Preceded by Isaac Halstead Williamson	Governor of New Jersey; November 6, 1829 – October 26, 1832	Succeeded by Samuel L. Southard
Preceded by Elias P. Seeley	Governor of New Jersey; October 25, 1833 – October 28, 1836	Succeeded by Philemon Dickerson
U.S. House of Representatives
Preceded by John Bancker Aycrigg, William Halstead, John Patterson Bryan Maxwell, Joseph Fitz Randolph, Charles C. Stratton, Thomas Jones Yorke	Member of the U.S. House of Representatives from New Jersey's at-large congressional district March 4, 1839 – March 3, 1841; Served alongside: William Raworth Cooper, Philemon Dickerson, Joseph Kille, Joseph Fitz Randolph, Daniel Bailey Ryall	Succeeded by John Bancker Aycrigg, William Halstead, John Patterson Bryan Maxwell, Joseph Fitz Randolph, Charles C. Stratton, Thomas Jones Yorke
Diplomatic posts
Preceded by Daniel D. Barnard	United States Envoy to Prussia; November 4, 1853 – August 10, 1857	Succeeded by Joseph A. Wright
