= Charles Pettit McIlvaine =

American bishop (1799–1873)

The Right Reverend Charles Pettit McIlvaine D.D., D.C.L., LL.D.
- Bishop of Ohio
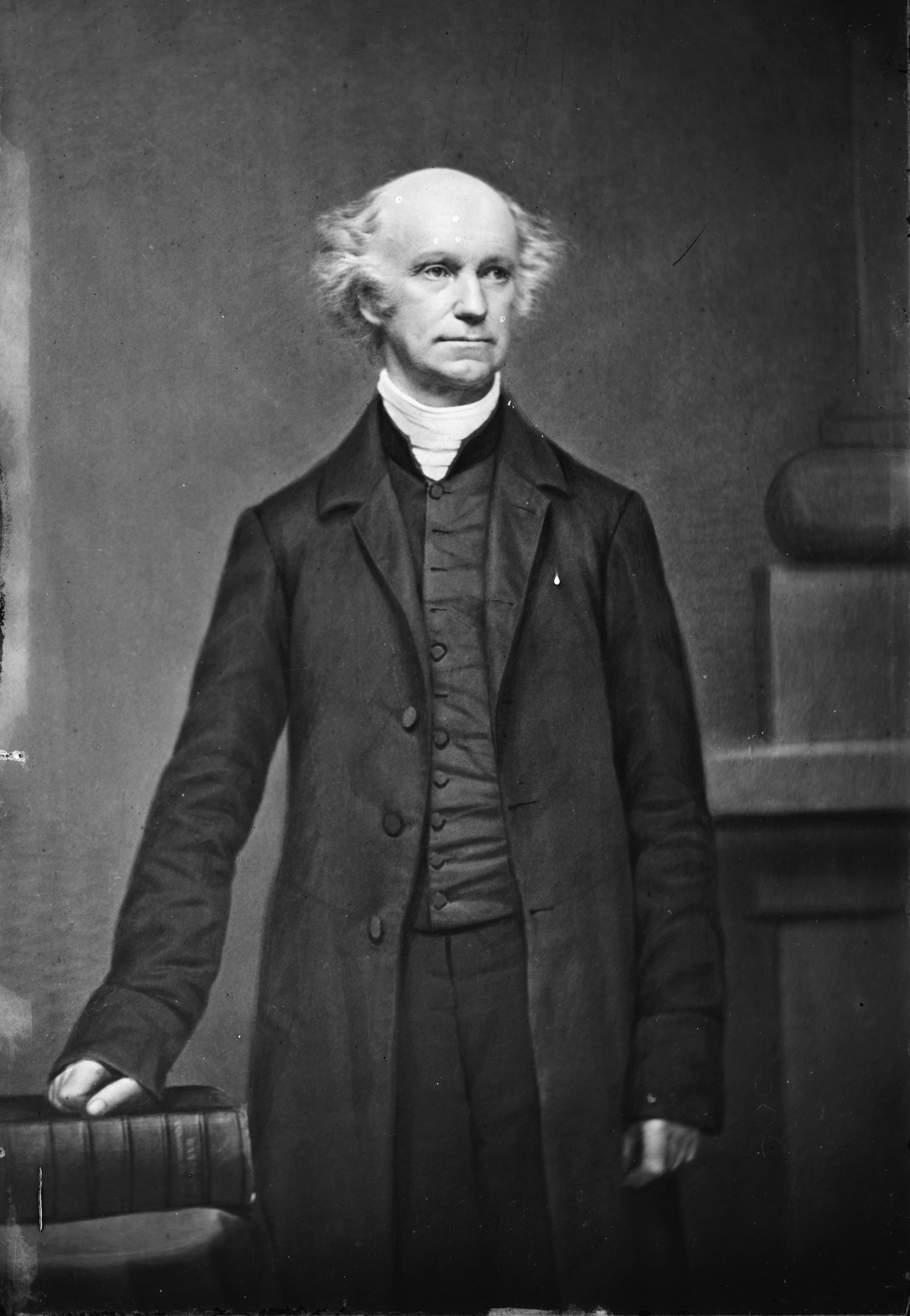
- Church: Episcopal Church
- Diocese: Ohio
- Elected: September 7, 1832
- In office: 1832–1873
- Predecessor: Philander Chase
- Successor: Gregory T. Bedell

Orders
- Ordination: March 20, 1821 by William White
- Consecration: October 31, 1832 by William White

Personal details
- Born: January 18, 1799 Burlington, New Jersey, United States
- Died: March 13, 1873 (aged 74) Florence, Kingdom of Italy
- Buried: Spring Grove Cemetery
- Denomination: Anglican
- Parents: Joseph McIlvaine & Maria Reed
- Spouse: Emily Coxe (m. 1822)
- Children: 4
- Education: Princeton University

Charles Pettit McIlvaine (January 18, 1799 – March 13, 1873) was an Episcopal bishop, author, educator and twice Chaplain of the United States Senate.

== Early life and family ==
McIlvaine was born on January 18, 1799, in Burlington, New Jersey to Joseph McIlvaine (later United States Senator from New Jersey) and Maria Reed (daughter of Bowes Reed, the Secretary of State of New Jersey, and niece of Joseph Reed, Continental Congressman and Governor of Pennsylvania). His father was of Scottish origin, from the MacIlvaines of Ayrshire.

McIlvaine was educated at Burlington Academy and entered the College of New Jersey (later Princeton University), where he graduated in 1816. The following year, he entered the theological seminary attached to the First Presbyterian Church of Princeton.

== Career ==
In 1820 he was ordained to the diaconate in Philadelphia, and was soon after called to Christ Church in Georgetown, Washington, D.C. In 1822 he was appointed chaplain to the U.S. Senate.

From 1825 to 1827, McIlvaine served as chaplain and professor of ethics at the United States Military Academy at West Point, where his students included Robert E. Lee and Jefferson Davis.

In 1827 McIlvaine declined the presidency of The College of William & Mary but accepted a call to St. Ann's Church in Brooklyn, New York. In 1831 he was named professor of the evidences of revealed religion at the University of the City of New York.

In 1832, he became the 2nd president of Kenyon College in Gambier, Ohio, and also the second Bishop of Ohio.

He was a leading advocate of Evangelicalism, and wrote a noted rebuttal of the Oxford Movement, Oxford Divinity Compared with That of the Romish and Anglican Churches.

He was the 28th bishop consecrated in The Episcopal Church.

Bishop McIlvaine was so highly respected internationally (for his opposition to the Catholic-leaning Oxford movement within the Episcopal Church) that, shortly after the outbreak of the Civil War, President Lincoln asked him to go to England with Archbishop Hughes and Peter Force to argue against British recognition of the Confederacy. He often had coffee at Buckingham Palace, lunched with faculty members at Oxford, conversed with cabinet members, and influenced debate in the House of Commons.

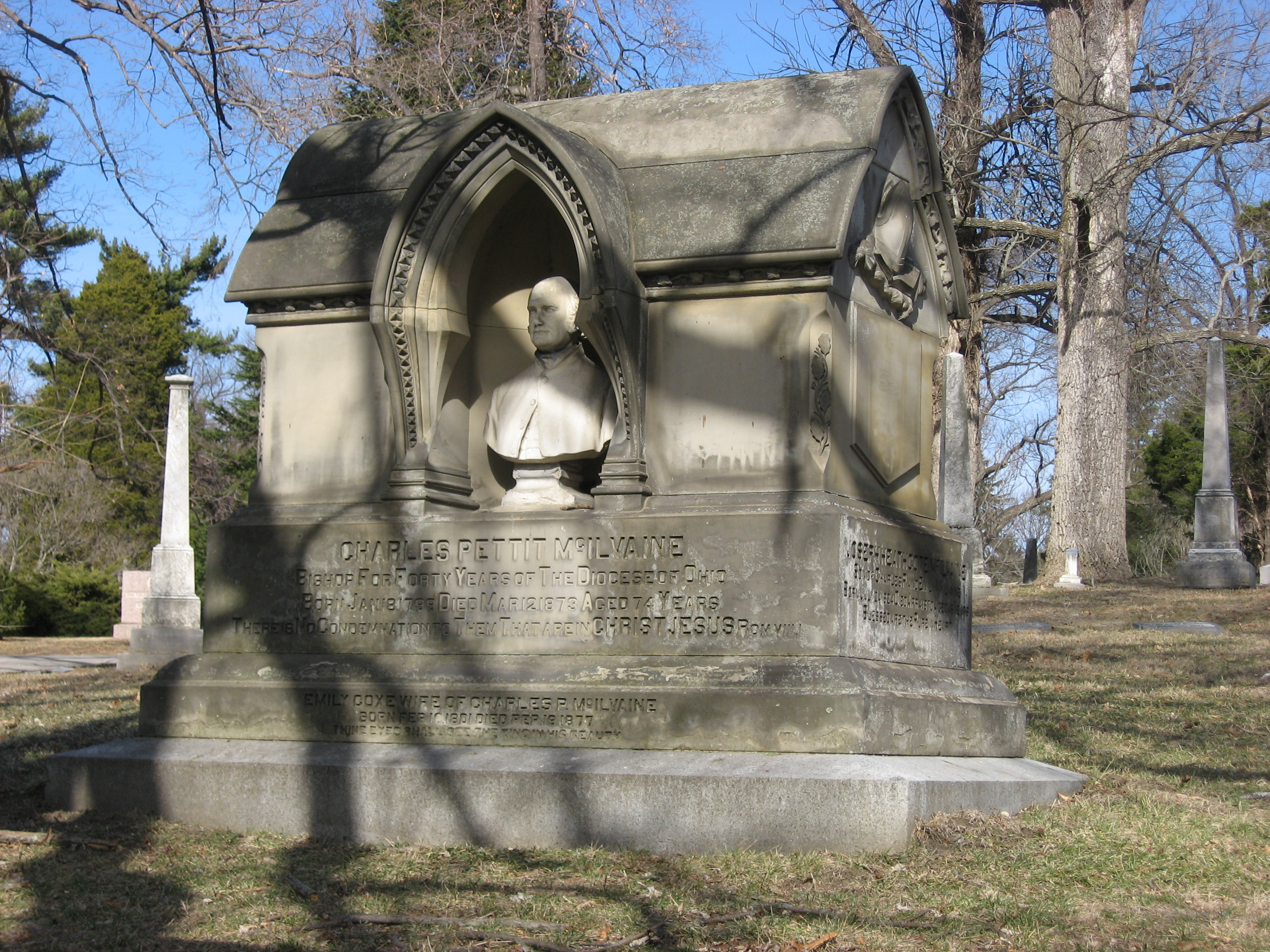
McIlvaine's grave in Spring Grove Cemetery

== Death ==
McIlvaine died in Florence, Italy on March 13, 1873. His body, carried through England on its journey home to Ohio, was honored for four days in Westminster Abbey, the only American to this day to lie-in-state at Westminster.

== See also ==
- Historical list of bishops of the Episcopal Church in the United States of America

Episcopal Church (USA) titles
Preceded by William Ryland	Chaplain of the United States Senate; December 9, 1822 – December 9, 1823	Succeeded by William Staughton
Preceded by William Staughton	Chaplain of the United States Senate; December 14, 1824 – December 11, 1825	Succeeded by William Staughton
Preceded by Philander Chase	2nd Bishop of Ohio; 1832–1873	Succeeded by Gregory Thurston Bedell
Academic offices
Preceded by Philander Chase	President of Kenyon College (and Bexley Hall); 1832–1840	Succeeded by David Bates Douglass
