= William Staughton =

American Baptist clergyman (1770–1829)

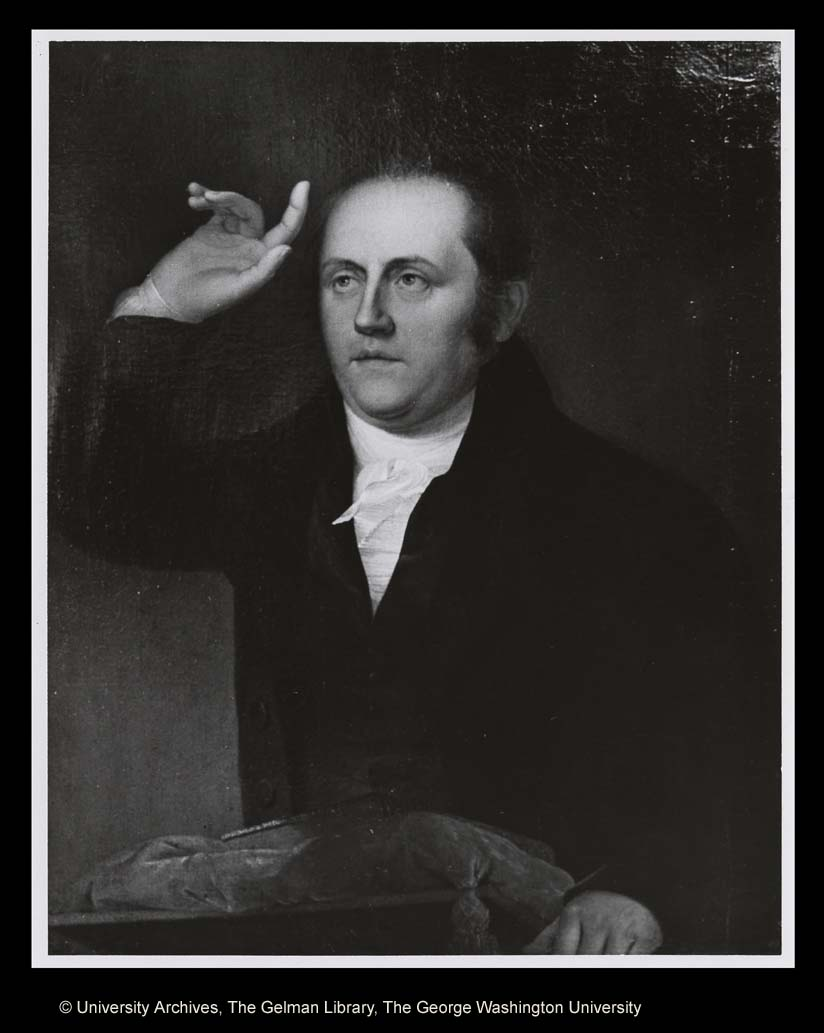
William Staughton

William Staughton (January 4, 1770 – December 12, 1829) was a Baptist clergyman, educator, and music composer. He was also a Chaplain of the United States Senate and the first President of Columbian College from 1821-1827, which is the original name and oldest division (1821) of The George Washington University.

== Life ==
Staughton was born on January 4, 1770, in Coventry, Warwickshire, England, to Sutton and Keziah Staughton. In 1792, he graduated from Bristol Baptist College. He became a preacher in Northampton, and in 1792 helped found the Baptist Missionary Society.

Staughton moved to Charleston, South Carolina, in 1793. After marrying Maria Hanson shortly after his arrival, he preached in Georgetown, South Carolina, for approximately two years. In 1795, Staughton moved to York City and then to Bordentown, New Jersey, where he preached at a Baptist church, headed an academy, and was ordained a Baptist minister on June 17, 1797. He continued his educational studies at Princeton University and received a Doctor of Divinity in 1801. From 1805 to 1811, Staughton fulfilled pastorship positions at the First Baptist Church in Philadelphia, Pennsylvania (1805–1811) and the Sansom Street Church (1811–1822). Concurrently, Staughton also acted as the designated tutor of the Baptist Education Society of America of the Middle States, was one of the founding members of the Bible Society at Philadelphia (now known as the Pennsylvania Bible Society), helped organize the Triennial Convention from 1814-1826, and served as the Principal of the Theological Department of the Triennial Convention in 1817.

When the Columbian College opened on January 9, 1822, William Staughton presided as president. He also taught theological and classical courses at the college, including general history, belles lettres, rhetoric, moral philosophy and divinity, and pulpit eloquence. During his tenure as president, Staughton simultaneously served as chaplain of the Congress for two sessions. After five years serving as president, Staughton resigned due to the college's financial troubles and dispute among the board of trustees regarding the theology and classic departments.

In 1826, he was sent, along with Samuel Wait, future first president of Wake Forest University, to New Bern, North Carolina, to raise funds for the church.

William accepted a position as president of the Literary and Theological Institution of Georgetown College in Georgetown, Kentucky, in September 1829. However, while making the journey to the college, Staughton died on December 12, 1829. He was originally buried in the District of Columbia's Episcopal cemetery, but his body was later moved to Philadelphia's Sansom Street Church Cemetery.

== Works ==
In addition to his pastoral and educator careers, Staughton also wrote poems, sermons, discourses, lyrics, and hymns. In fact, several of his hymns can be found in the Baptist Hymn Book of 1825. He made literary contributions to The Latter Day Luminary and edited The Works of Virgil, as well as A Compendious System of Greek Grammar by Edward Wetenhall. In 1808, Staughton was also a member of the American Philosophical Society.

A collection of documents and artifacts associated with Staughton is maintained by the Special Collections Research Center at The George Washington University. The collection includes correspondence, writings, photographs of paintings, and biographical information on the Staughton family.

Religious titles
Preceded by Charles Pettit McIlvaine	Chaplain of the United States Senate; December 10, 1823 – December 13, 1824	Succeeded by Charles Pettit McIlvaine
Preceded by Charles Pettit McIlvaine	Chaplain of the United States Senate; December 12, 1825 – December 7, 1826	Succeeded by William Ryland
