= Ezra Baker =

American politician

Member of the U.S. House of Representatives from New Jersey's at-large district
- In office March 4, 1815 – March 3, 1817
- Preceded by: Adam Boyd
- Succeeded by: Joseph Bloomfield

Personal details
- Born: c. 1765 Tuckerton, Province of New Jersey, British America
- Died: New Orleans, Louisiana, U.S.
- Party: Democratic-Republican
- Profession: Politician, physician

Ezra Baker was an American politician and physician who served a single term in the United States House of Representatives, representing the at-large congressional district of New Jersey from 1815 to 1817 as a member of the Democratic-Republican Party.

== Early life and education ==
Baker was born in Tuckerton in the Province of New Jersey around the year 1765. He was educated for the medical profession.

== Career ==
Baker commenced practice and moved to Absecon, New Jersey, in 1799.

Baker served as collector of customs at the port of Great Egg Harbor from February 18, 1813 to March 1, 1815.

Baker was elected as a Democratic-Republican to a single term in the United States House of Representatives. He served from March 4, 1815 to March 3, 1817, representing New Jersey's at-large congressional district in the 14th United States Congress.

Following his tenure in Congress, Baker moved westward with his sons in 1818. He engaged in the culture of castor beans for the New Orleans market.

== Death ==
Baker died in New Orleans.

== See also ==
- List of United States representatives who served a single term

U.S. House of Representatives
Preceded by Adam Boyd	Member of the U.S. House of Representatives from New Jersey's at-large congressional district 1815–1817	Succeeded by Joseph Bloomfield
