= Gregory T. Bedell =

American bishop

The Right Reverend Gregory Thurston Bedell D.D.
- Bishop of Ohio
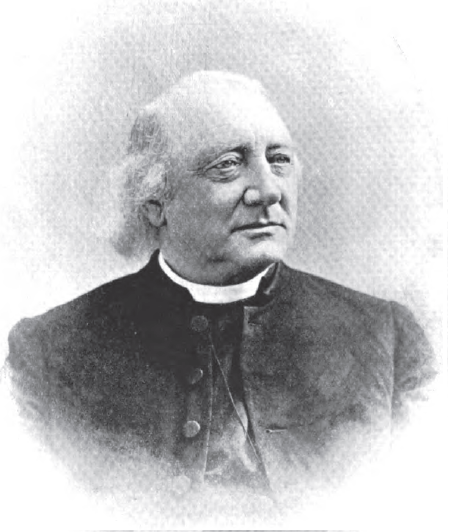
- Church: Episcopal Church
- Diocese: Ohio
- In office: 1873–1889
- Predecessor: Charles Pettit McIlvaine
- Successor: William Andrew Leonard
- Previous post: Assistant Bishop of Ohio (1859-1873)

Orders
- Ordination: August 29, 1841 by Richard Channing Moore
- Consecration: October 13, 1859 by William Meade

Personal details
- Born: August 27, 1817 Hudson, New York, United States
- Died: March 11, 1892 (aged 74) New York City, New York), United States
- Buried: Kenyon College Cemetery
- Denomination: Anglican
- Parents: Gregory Townsend Bedell & Penelope Thurston
- Spouse: Julia Strong (m. 1845)
- Children: 2

Gregory Thurston Bedell (August 27, 1817 – March 11, 1892) was the third Episcopal Bishop of Ohio.

== Early life ==
Bedell was born in Hudson, New York in 1817, the son of Rev. Gregory Townsend Bedell of Staten Island and his wife, Penelope Thurston Bedell. While an infant, Bedell's family moved to Fayetteville, North Carolina. In 1822, they moved again to Philadelphia where his father became the rector of St. Andrew's Episcopal Church. Bedell was given a thorough preparation for college in Dr. Muhlenberg's increasingly admired school in Queen's County, New York. After gaining the diploma from the Institute at Flushing, Bedell attended Bristol College, an Episcopal institution not destined for a long life. He graduated in 1836 and headed to Alexandria to be prepared for ordination at the Virginia Theological Seminary, graduating in 1840.

Bedell was ordained deacon that same year by his great-uncle, Bishop Richard Channing Moore, and was ordained priest by the same bishop in 1841. After his ordination to the priesthood, he served as rector of Church of the Holy Trinity in West Chester, Pennsylvania. Two years later, Bedell moved to Church of the Ascension in New York City, where he remained until his elevation to the episcopate. While there, Bedell earned a doctorate of divinity from Norwich University. In 1845, Bedell married Julia Strong. They had three children, all of whom died in infancy.

== Bishop of Ohio ==
Bedell was consecrated coadjutor Bishop of Ohio in 1859. He was the 67th bishop in the ECUSA, and was consecrated in St. Paul's Church, Richmond, Virginia by Bishops William Meade, Charles Pettit McIlvaine, and John Johns, along with other co-consecrators. He served as coadjutor bishop for fourteen years and, during the American Civil War, preached loyalty to the Union. When Bishop McIlvaine died in 1873, Bedell succeeded him as the third Bishop of Ohio. In 1875, the diocese was divided into northern and southern parts, and Bedell remained bishop of the northern part, which retained the name "Ohio". Theologically, Bedell leaned toward the evangelical side of the Episcopal Church, in contrast to the growing Tractarian movement. That one coming out of Muhlenberg's Church Institute at Flushing (and from 1836, College Point NY) sympathized more with the evangelical element of Anglican Christianity should not surprise us; for Muhlenberg called himself an "Evangelical Catholic" Christian. The first half of the term connoted the spontaneous, Spirit-driven aspect of the Faith; the latter stood for order, structure, and the orthodox dogmas of the historic Catholic Church of the Creed. While many of the Flushing and College Point alumni identified with the High Church and (later) Anglo-Catholic wings of the PECUSA, many did not.

Bedell resigned his episcopal duties in 1889, owing to physical infirmity, and died in 1892.
