= William Griffith (New Jersey attorney) =

United States federal judge (1766–1826)

Judge of the United States Circuit Court for the Third Circuit
- In office February 20, 1801 – July 1, 1802
- Appointed by: John Adams
- Preceded by: Seat established by 2 Stat. 89
- Succeeded by: Seat abolished

Personal details
- Born: William Griffith; 1766 Bound Brook, Province of New Jersey, British America
- Died: June 7, 1826 (aged 59–60) Burlington, New Jersey
- Education: read law

William Griffith (1766 – June 7, 1826) was a United States circuit judge of the United States Circuit Court for the Third Circuit.

== Education and career ==
Born in 1766, in Bound Brook, Province of New Jersey, British America, Griffith read law in 1788. He entered private practice in Burlington, New Jersey from 1789 to 1801. He was a surrogate for Burlington County, New Jersey from 1790 to 1799. He was a member of the Burlington Common Council from 1793 to 1797. In 1796, he published A treatise on the jurisdiction and proceedings of justices of the peace in civil suits (Burlington, Elderkin & Miller, 1796) and in 1797 The Scriveners Guide (Newark, Printed by John Woods, 1797)

== Federal judicial service ==
Griffith was nominated by President John Adams on February 18, 1801, to the United States Circuit Court for the Third Circuit, to a new seat authorized by 2 Stat. 89. He was confirmed by the United States Senate on February 20, 1801, and received his commission the same day. His service terminated on July 1, 1802, due to abolition of the court.

== Later career and death ==
Following his departure from the federal bench, Griffith resumed private practice in Burlington from 1802 to 1826. He was a member of the New Jersey General Assembly from 1818 to 1819, and from 1823 to 1824. He was the Mayor of Burlington from 1824 to 1826. Griffith was appointed Clerk of the Supreme Court of the United States in 1826, but died before assuming his duties. He died on June 7, 1826, in Burlington.

== Sources ==
Legal offices
Preceded by Seat established by 2 Stat. 89	Judge of the United States Circuit Court for the Third Circuit; 1801–1802	Succeeded by Seat abolished
