= Ann Wood Henry =

American public office holder (1786–1734)

Ann Wood Henry (née Wood; January 21, 1734 – March 8, 1799) served as treasurer of Lancaster County, Pennsylvania, and became the first woman in Pennsylvania's history to hold public office. She was the wife of William Henry, a gunsmith, inventor, delegate to the Continental Congress, and patriot in the American Revolution.

== Background ==
Born Ann Wood in Burlington, Province of New Jersey on January 21, 1734, she married William Henry in 1756; the couple had thirteen children, including John Joseph Henry (1758–1811), a judge; William Henry, who moved to Nazareth, Province of Pennsylvania and carried on his father's gunsmith business; and Benjamin West Henry (1777–1806), a painter, named after the famous painter who had, in 1756, lodged in the Henry home. Benjamin West painted portraits of both Ann and William Henry, as well as the precocious "Death of Socrates", which was passed down in the Henry family until 1989 (when the will of Mary Henry Stites bequeathed it to the Historical Society of Pennsylvania).

According to the best available information, Ann Henry was an upper-class woman with means who was primarily focused on attending to the domestic sphere of her and her husband's household. When William went to fight during the war, Ann was responsible for taking over his duties. William held multiple leadership positions in the state in judicial, legislative, and military spheres. The couple and their 13 children were reportedly deeply involved in the church.

The Henry household during the Revolutionary War was an important military and intellectual center. During the British occupation of Philadelphia, David Rittenhouse, then Treasurer for the Commonwealth of Pennsylvania, stayed in the Henry home, as did Thomas Paine, who wrote his fifth Crisis there. According to John Joseph Henry, who was in Lancaster recuperating from injuries suffered while serving with Benedict Arnold in Quebec, Paine's indolence and irreligion disgusted Ann Henry. William Henry continuously fought sickness and eventually died from it which left Ann as his widow.

After the death of her husband, Ann took the position of treasurer (like William had been) of Lancaster County, Pennsylvania. She served the rest of his term as well as her own. Evidently, Ann was the first woman in Pennsylvania's history to become a public official. She died on January 8, 1799, and was buried two days later in the Moravian cemetery in Lancaster.
