= John Joseph Henry =

American lawyer (1758–1811)

John Joseph Henry (November 4, 1758 – April 15, 1811) was an American private soldier, lawyer, and judge from Pennsylvania in the American Revolutionary War.

== Biography ==
Henry, the son of William Henry of Lancaster and Ann Wood Henry, was born in Lancaster, Pennsylvania. His father, an important gunsmith, apprenticed him at the age of 14 to an uncle, also a gunsmith, who moved with John Joseph to Detroit. Perhaps due to lack of business, the young man returned to Lancaster, on foot, with a guide who died in the wilderness along the way.

At age sixteen he enlisted as a rifleman in the Pennsylvania state troops and marched with Benedict Arnold's expedition to Quebec in 1775. Taken prisoner during the ill-fated attempt to storm the city on January 1, 1776, Henry remained confined for nine months. He was confined for a time aboard HMS Pearl in New York's harbor; while imprisoned there he witnessed the Great Fire of New York. He spent two years recuperating from his injuries at his father's home in Lancaster, and never healed completely.

Henry began to study law and, after clerking for Stephen Chambers, a prominent Lancaster attorney, he was admitted to the bar in 1785. In 1793 he was appointed president judge of the second district of Pennsylvania.

Henry married Chambers's younger sister, Jane. His will indicates that he had at least eight children: Anne-Mary, Caroline, Elisabeth, Harriet-Sidney, Amelia-Catherine, Lydia-Chambers, and Julian. The eighth and eldest, Stephen Chambers Henry, was "for good causes...absolutely exclude[d] and disinherit[ed]" in his father's will. Stephen Chambers Henry (January 4, 1786 – August 12, 1834) earned his M.D. from the University of Pennsylvania and in 1809 moved to Detroit, where he was a surgeon during the War of 1812 and, like his father, taken prisoner. He died of cholera in 1834.

John Joseph Henry's career as a lawyer and judge was cut short by the recurrence of the injuries that he had suffered during the march on Quebec. These injuries prevented his attendance at court, and in 1809 the legislature debated, only to reject, a petition to remove him from office. He resigned his office in January 1811. In his final years he wrote An Accurate and Interesting Account of the Hardships and Sufferings of That Band of Heroes, Who Traversed the Wilderness in the Campaign Against Quebec in 1775, published in 1812 after his death. His account of the Arnold expedition has been often quoted and frequently reprinted.
