= Joseph McIlvaine =

American politician (1769–1826)

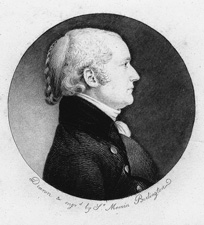

United States Senator from New Jersey
- In office November 12, 1823 – August 19, 1826
- Preceded by: Samuel L. Southard
- Succeeded by: Ephraim Bateman

United States Attorney for the District of New Jersey
- In office 1804–1824
- President: Thomas Jefferson, James Madison, and James Monroe
- Preceded by: William Sanford Pennington
- Succeeded by: Lucius Elmer

Personal details
- Born: October 2, 1769; Bristol, Pennsylvania
- Died: August 19, 1826 (aged 56); Burlington, New Jersey
- Political party: National Republican

Joseph McIlvaine (October 2, 1769 – August 19, 1826) was a United States senator from New Jersey from 1823 until his death. He served as the mayor of Burlington, New Jersey, from 1816 to 1823.

== Biography ==
McIlvaine was born in Bristol, Pennsylvania, to Col. Joseph Mcllvaine (1749–1787) and Catherine Swan. His father's sister, Mary McIlvaine (1752–1818), married Joseph Bloomfield, later Governor of New Jersey.

After pursuing an academic course and studying law, he was admitted to the bar of New Jersey in 1790 and commenced practice in Burlington, New Jersey in 1791.

He was clerk of Burlington County, New Jersey from 1796 to 1800; clerk of the Burlington County Court from 1800 to 1823; and U.S. Attorney for the District of New Jersey from 1804 to 1820. He was appointed as a judge to the New Jersey Superior Court in 1818, but declined.

He was elected to the United States Senate to fill the vacancy caused by the resignation of Samuel L. Southard and served from November 12, 1823, until his death in Burlington, New Jersey, where he was buried at Saint Mary's Episcopal Churchyard.

== Family ==
On September 19, 1793, McIlvaine married Maria Reed, daughter of Bowes Reed, Secretary of State of New Jersey, and niece of Joseph Reed, Continental Congressman and Governor of Pennsylvania. They had three children:

1. Bowes Reed McIlvaine b: 1794
2. Joseph McIlvaineIII b: c. 1796 in Burlington, New Jersey
3. Reverend Charles Pettit McIlvaine (1798–1873), Bishop of the Episcopal Diocese of Ohio
4. Bloomfield McIlvaine b: c. 1799 d-1826 in Burlington, New Jersey
5. Henry McIlvaine: c. 1805 in Burlington, New Jersey
6. William McIlvaine b: c. 1806
7. Emerson McIlvaine b: c. 1807
8. Edward McIlvaine b: c. 1808
9. Mary McIlvaine b: c. 1809
10. Ellen McIlvaine b: c. 1810

== See also ==
- List of members of the United States Congress who died in office (1790–1899)

U.S. Senate
Preceded by Samuel L. Southard	U.S. senator (Class 1) from New Jersey; November 12, 1823 – August 19, 1826; Served alongside: Mahlon Dickerson	Succeeded by Ephraim Bateman
