= Samuel W. Stockton =

American politician (1751-1795)

Samuel Witham Stockton (February 4, 1751 – June 27, 1795) was an American lawyer, diplomat and public servant who served as Secretary of State of New Jersey from 1794 to 1795.

== Biography ==
Stockton was born in 1751, the youngest of the eight children of John Stockton and his wife Abigail, at Morven, the family estate in Princeton, New Jersey. He was the brother of Richard Stockton, a signer of the Declaration of Independence.

Stockton studied law at the College of New Jersey (now Princeton University), receiving a Bachelor of Arts degree in 1767 and a Master of Arts degree in 1770. In 1775 he went to London to continue his legal studies and was still abroad when the Revolutionary War broke out.

Remaining in Europe, he served as secretary to William Lee in 1777 when the Continental Congress appointed Lee commissioner at the Courts of Vienna and Berlin in an unsuccessful attempt to win the support of Austria and Prussia in the war. In 1778 Stockton was instrumental in negotiating a secret treaty between the United States and the Dutch Republic that, when discovered by the British, sparked the Fourth Anglo-Dutch War. He returned to New Jersey in 1779.

Like his Brother Richard, Samuel was a Freemason. He was a member of Trenton Lodge No. 5, in Trenton, NJ.

He unsuccessfully ran for secretary of the House of Representatives when the 1st United States Congress was organized in 1789.

In 1792 he was an Alderman of Trenton, New Jersey. In 1794 he was named Secretary of State of New Jersey after the death of Bowes Reed. He died in office on June 27, 1795 at the age of 44, after being thrown from his carriage in Trenton.

Political offices
Preceded by Bowes Reed	Secretary of State of New Jersey; 1794 – 1795	Succeeded by John Beatty
