= Charles Pettit =

American politician (1736–1806)

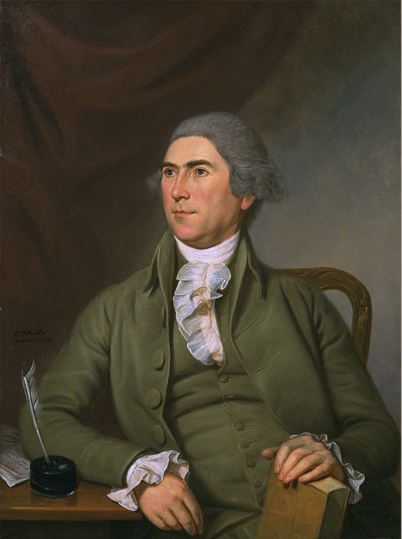
Charles Pettit (1792)

Charles Pettit (1736 – September 4, 1806) was an American lawyer and merchant from New Jersey and Philadelphia, Pennsylvania. He served as a delegate for Pennsylvania to the Confederation Congress from 1785 to 1787.

== Biography ==
Charles Pettit was born in 1736. His parents were Andrew and Dinah (Woolverton) Pettit of Hunterdon County, New Jersey.

In 1758 he married Sarah Reed, a half-sister of Joseph Reed. Reed exerted considerable influence on Pettit's later career, bringing him into politics.

In 1767 Pettit accepted the first of many public service positions as a deputy surrogate for the province to assist his brother-in-law, Reed, who was Secretary. When Reed resigned in 1769, Pettit was appointed as the colony's secretary.

After studying with an established firm, Pettit was admitted to the bar in 1770. In 1773 he was selected as a member of the Governor's Council.

Pettit served as a personal secretary to Governor William Franklin from 1772 to 1774, and moved to South Amboy, New Jersey. As the Revolution neared, he resigned his post.

He returned to it in 1776 when appointed as secretary to the revolutionary governor, William Livingston. From 1776 to 1778 Pettit held the office of provincial secretary (a title specified by the 1776 New Jersey State Constitution and later known as Secretary of State of New Jersey).

In 1777, his brother-in-law Joseph Reed again influenced his career. Reed was then serving in the Continental Congress and worked on the committee that recommended an overhaul of the quartermaster's function. In 1778, Pettit was appointed deputy quartermaster general, essentially a civilian post. But it came with a commission as a colonel in the Continental Army, a perk which offended some of the army's line officers. Pettit kept the accounts for the corps from then until his resignation in 1781. He also moved to Philadelphia to be closer to the Congress, which was temporarily meeting in New York.

After his military service, Pettit resumed a mercantile career, this time in Philadelphia. He had been a member of the American Philosophical Society, based in that city, since 1779. He was elected to represent Philadelphia in the state's House of Representatives in 1784 and 1785. The legislature twice selected him as a delegate to the Continental Congress, where he served from 1785 to 1787, and he was a candidate for the U.S. House of Representatives in 1788. He also was appointed a trustee for the University of the State of Pennsylvania in 1786; he continued in the post after it merged to create the University of Pennsylvania in 1791.

Pettit died in Philadelphia in 1806.

Political offices
| Preceded by Position created | Secretary of State of New Jersey; 1776–1778 | Succeeded by Bowes Reed |
