= Joseph Bloomfield =

American general and 4th Governor of New Jersey (1753–1823)

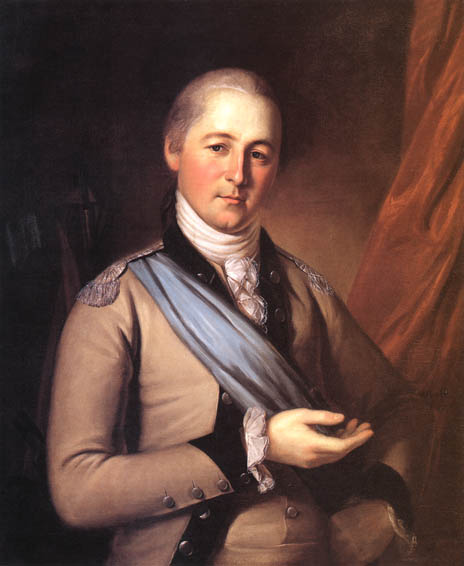
- painting by Charles Willson Peale

4th Governor of New Jersey
- In office October 29, 1803 – October 29, 1812
- Preceded by: John Lambert (acting)
- Succeeded by: Aaron Ogden
- In office October 31, 1801 – October 28, 1802
- Preceded by: Richard Howell
- Succeeded by: John Lambert (acting)

Member of the U.S. House of Representatives from New Jersey's at-large congressional district
- In office March 4, 1817 – March 3, 1821
- Preceded by: Ezra Baker
- Succeeded by: George Cassedy

Mayor of Burlington, New Jersey
- In office 1795–1800
- Preceded by: Bowes Reed
- Succeeded by: James Sterling

Personal details
- Born: October 18, 1753 Woodbridge, Province of New Jersey, British America
- Died: October 3, 1823 (aged 69) Burlington, New Jersey, U.S.
- Resting place: Saint Mary's Episcopal Churchyard
- Party: Democratic-Republican
- Spouse(s): Mary McIlvaine (1752–1818); Isabella Ramsey (1779–1871)

Joseph Bloomfield (October 18, 1753 – October 3, 1823) was the fourth governor of New Jersey. He also served two terms in the United States House of Representatives from 1817 to 1821.

The township of Bloomfield, New Jersey, is named for him.

== Birth ==
Joseph Bloomfield was born in Woodbridge in the Province of New Jersey to Moses Bloomfield, a physician, and Sarah Ogden on October 18, 1753. Moses Bloomfield was a surgeon and an abolitionist who represented Middlesex County in the Provincial Congress of New Jersey.

== Education and military service ==
Coat of Arms of Joseph Bloomfield

Joseph was educated at Reverend Enoch Green's school in Deerfield Township, New Jersey, where Green was the pastor of the local Presbyterian Church. Bloomfield studied law, was admitted to the bar in 1775 and began his law practice in Bridgeton, New Jersey. He entered the Continental Army as captain of the 3rd New Jersey Regiment on February 9, 1776. He attained the rank of major on November 28, 1776, and was appointed judge advocate of the northern army. He was wounded at the Battle of Brandywine in September 1777. He resigned from the Continental Army on October 28, 1778, after he was elected clerk of the New Jersey General Assembly.

In 1794, Bloomfield led Federal and New Jersey state troops to put down the Whiskey Rebellion, a popular uprising conducted by Appalachian settlers who resisted the excise tax on liquor and distilled drinks, near Pittsburgh, Pennsylvania. From 1795 to 1800 he served as Mayor of Burlington, New Jersey.

At the start of the War of 1812 Bloomfield was commissioned as a brigadier general in the United States Army on March 13, 1812. He served until June 15, 1815, along the Canada–US border.

== Marriages ==
Joseph married Mary McIlvaine (1752–1818), the daughter of William McIlvaine (1722–1770), a physician from Burlington, New Jersey. Her brother, Col. Joseph McIlvaine (1749–1787), was the father of Joseph McIlvaine (1769–1826), United States Senator from New Jersey. They had no children.

After the death of his first wife, he married Isabella Ramsey (1779–1871), the daughter of John Ramsey.

== Public life ==
At the close of the Revolutionary War, Bloomfield became one of the founding members of The Society of the Cincinnati in the state of New Jersey, and served as the State Society's president from 1808 until his death in 1823.

He practiced law in Burlington, New Jersey, and was the registrar of the admiralty court from 1779 to 1783.

=== Elected office ===
He served as the New Jersey attorney general from 1783 to 1792 and as a trustee of Princeton College from 1793 until his death. He was elected Governor of New Jersey as a Democratic-Republican and served in office from 1801 to 1802 and from 1803 to 1812.

In 1814, Bloomfield was elected a member of the American Antiquarian Society.

=== Congress ===
Bloomfield was elected as a Democratic-Republican to the Fifteenth United States Congress and reelected to the Sixteenth Congress from March 4, 1817, through March 3, 1821, where he represented New Jersey's at-large congressional district. While in Congress, he led the Committee on Revolutionary Pensions. Bloomfield ran for, but was not elected to, the Seventeenth Congress. He also previously ran in the 1795 and 1797 elections for the at-large seat, both of in which the top 5 would win; he finished 7th both times.

== Death and burial ==
Bloomfield died in Burlington, New Jersey, on October 3, 1823, and was buried in Saint Mary's Episcopal Churchyard in Burlington.

== Legacy ==
In 1796, what had been known as the Old First Church was formed and was named the Presbyterian Society of Bloomfield in honor of Joseph Bloomfield. When the Township of Bloomfield was formed, the name was taken from the name of the church.

Legal offices
Preceded by William Paterson (judge)	New Jersey Attorney General; 1783–1792	Succeeded by Aaron Woodruff
Political offices
Preceded by Richard Howell	Governor of New Jersey; October 31, 1801 – October 28, 1802	Succeeded by John Lambert; Acting Governor
Preceded by John Lambert; Acting Governor	Governor of New Jersey; October 29, 1803 – October 29, 1812	Succeeded by Aaron Ogden
U.S. House of Representatives
Preceded by Ezra Baker; Ephraim Bateman	Member of the U.S. House of Representatives from New Jersey's at-large congressional district March 4, 1817 – March 3, 1821 alongside Ephraim Bateman	Succeeded by At-large; Ephraim Bateman; George Cassedy; Lewis Condict; George Holcombe; James Matlack; Samuel Swan
