= Mayor of Burlington, New Jersey =

Political office in the United States

Burlington, New Jersey was incorporated on December 21, 1784. It is governed within the Faulkner Act (formally known as the Optional Municipal Charter Law) under the Mayor-Council form of municipal government (Plan 4), implemented based on the recommendations of a Charter Study Commission as of January 1, 1992. The governing body consists of a mayor and a seven-member Common Council, all elected on a partisan basis in a vote held as part of the November general election. The Mayor serves a four-year term of office. The Common Council consists of seven members, each serving four-year terms of office: three at-large Councilpersons representing the entire City and one representing each of the four voting wards, with the at||large and mayoral seats up for election as a group and the ward seats up for vote two years later. The term for mayor runs from January 1 to December 31.

== Mayors ==
Mayors are as follows:

Mayor	Term start	Term end	Notes
Bowes Reed	1785	1794	Burlington, New Jersey was incorporated on December 21, 1784. Bowes Reed was the first mayor of Burlington, New Jersey. (November 1740 – July 20, 1794) was a Revolutionary officer, politician, and public servant from New Jersey. He was the brother of Joseph Reed, a member of the Continental Congress and President of the Supreme Executive Council of Pennsylvania (equivalent to Governor).
Joseph Bloomfield	1795	1800	(October 18, 1753 – October 3, 1823) was the fourth Governor of New Jersey. The township of Bloomfield, New Jersey is named for him.
James Sterling (mayor)	1801	1806	
William Coxe, Jr.	1807	1815	(May 3, 1762 – February 25, 1831) was a pioneer pomologist and a U.S. Representative from New Jersey.
Joseph McIlvaine	1816	1823	(October 2, 1769 – August 19, 1826) was a United States senator from New Jersey from 1823 until his death.
William Griffith	1824	1826	(1766 – June 7, 1826) was a United States federal judge.
John E. Harris	1827	1833	
John Larzalere	1834	1836	
Samuel W. Earl	1837	1841	
William R. Allen	1842	1850	
James Walter Wall	1851	1854	(May 26, 1820 – June 9, 1872) was a United States senator from New Jersey during the American Civil War. He was the son of U.S. Senator Garret Dorset Wall.
Archibald W. Burns	1855	1857	
William R. Allen	1858	1862	
Henry H. Hollembaek	1863	1866	He died on November 5, 1896. He attended Thomas Jefferson University for his medical degree.
Joseph L. Powell (mayor)	1867	1869	
Henry Moffett	1870	1872	
Joseph L. Powell (mayor)	1873	1875	
Hamilton McDowell	1876	1878	
George Rigg (mayor)	1879	1882	
Albert H. Silpath	1883	1891	
Joseph P. Woolman	1892	1894	
William E. McNeal	1895	1898	
Charles Y. Flanders	1899	1903	
George A. Allinson	1904	1907	
C. Taylor Rue	1908	1909	
Charles P. Farner	1910	1912	
Elsworth E. Mount	1913	1921	
Thomas S. Mooney	1922	1927	
...	1928	1929	
Harold Voorhees Holmes	1930	1934	He was a Republican. He defeated George Gunn, the Democratic opponent.
...	1935	1949	
Richard P. Hughes	1950		
...	1951		
Anthony T. Greski	?	1966	
Herman Thomas Costello	1967	1991	
...	1992	1995	
Herman Thomas Costello	1996	2007	
Darlene A. Scocca	2007	2007	
James Fazzone	2008	2015	
Barry W. Conaway	2016	2023	Barry W. Conaway is the current mayor of Burlington, New Jersey.
