= Burlington, New Jersey =

City in Burlington County, New Jersey, US

- City
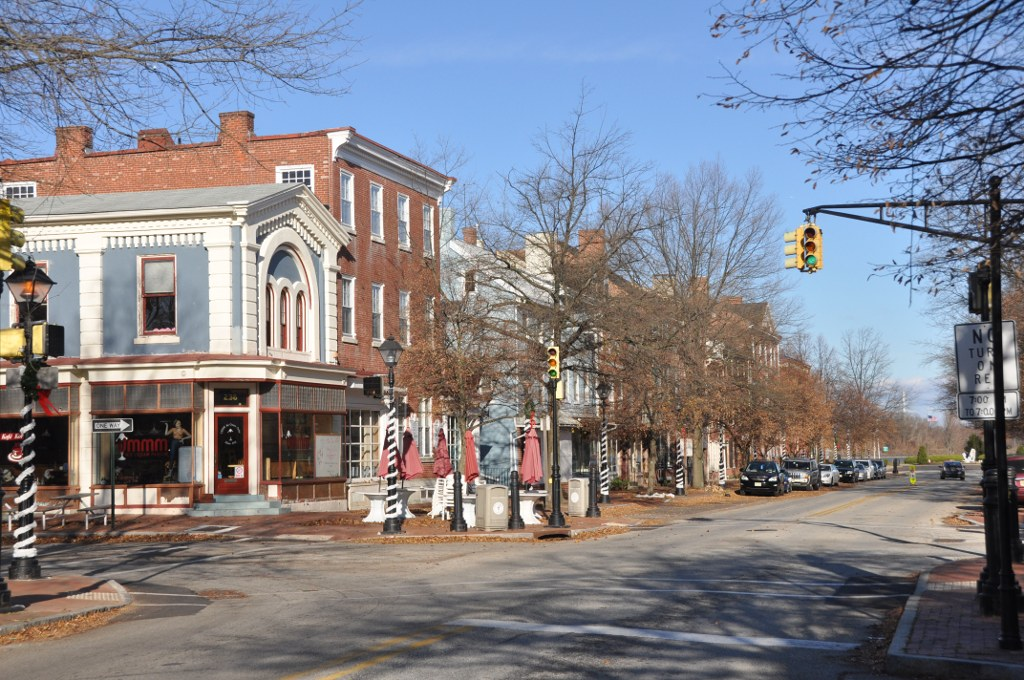
- The High Street Historic District in Burlington

- Seal

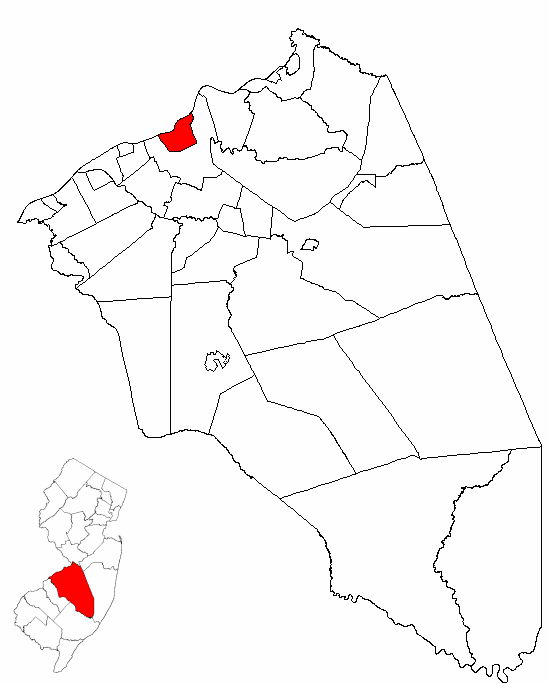
- Location of Burlington in Burlington County highlighted in red (right). Inset map: Location of Burlington County in New Jersey highlighted in red (left).

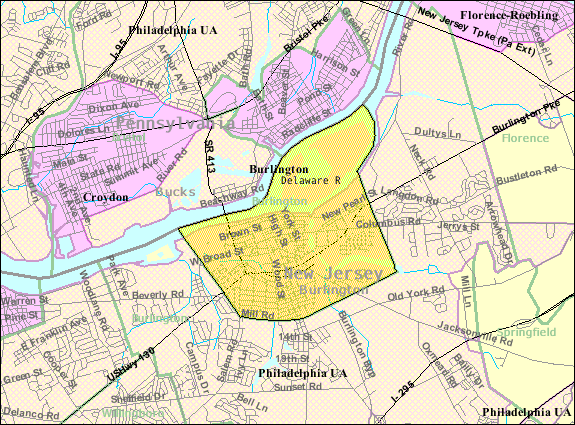
- Census Bureau map of Burlington, New Jersey

- Location in Burlington County Location in New Jersey Location in the United States
- Coordinates: 40.078307°N 74.853328°W
- Country: United States
- State: New Jersey
- County: Burlington
- Formed: October 24, 1693
- Royal charter: May 7, 1733
- Incorporated: December 21, 1784
- Reincorporated: March 14, 1851
- Named after: Bridlington, England

Government
  - Type: Faulkner Act (mayor–council)
  - Body: City Council
  - Mayor: Barry W. Conaway (D, term ends December 31, 2027)
  - Administrator: Johanna S. Conyer
  - Municipal clerk: Cindy A. Crivaro

Area
  - Total: 3.75 sq mi (9.72 km^{2})
  - Land: 3.03 sq mi (7.86 km^{2})
  - Water: 0.72 sq mi (1.86 km^{2}) 19.05%
  - Rank: 306th of 565 in state 28th of 40 in county
- Elevation: 10 ft (3.0 m)

Population (2020)
  - Total: 9,743
  - Estimate (2023): 10,024
  - Rank: 251st of 565 in state 16th of 40 in county
  - Density: 3,210.2/sq mi (1,239.5/km^{2})
  - Rank: 209th of 565 in state 10th of 40 in county
- Time zone: UTC−05:00 (Eastern (EST))
  - Summer (DST): UTC−04:00 (Eastern (EDT))
- ZIP Code: 08016
- Area code: 609
- FIPS code: 3400508920
- GNIS feature ID: 0885174
- Website: www.burlingtonnj.us

Burlington is a city situated on the banks of the Delaware River in Burlington County, in the U.S. state of New Jersey. It is a suburb of Philadelphia. As of the 2020 United States census, the city's population was 9,743, a decrease of 177 (−1.8%) from the 9,920 recorded at the 2010 census, which in turn reflected an increase of 184 (+1.9%) from the 9,736 counted in the 2000 census. The city, and all of Burlington County, is a part of the Philadelphia metropolitan area.

Burlington was first incorporated on October 24, 1693, and was reincorporated by Royal charter on May 7, 1733. After American independence, the city was incorporated by the State of New Jersey on December 21, 1784. On March 14, 1851, the city was reincorporated and enlarged with portions of the surrounding township.

Burlington was originally the county seat of Burlington County. In 1796, in response to the growth of population to the east away from the Delaware River, the county seat was moved to Mount Holly Township, a more central location.

== History ==
The council of West Jersey Proprietors purchased roughly 30 miles (48 km) of riverfront land in 1676 from the Lenape Native Americans. Burlington was founded on part of that land by English settlers (primarily Quakers) in 1677. It served as the capital of the province until 1702, when West Jersey and East Jersey were combined into a single Crown Colony.

Burlington takes its name (including the county name) from the town of Bridlington, England of which Burlington was a district. It is now amalgamated into the larger Bridlington town.

The Quakers formally established their congregation in 1678. Initially, they met in private homes; between 1683 and 1687, Francis Collings constructed a hexagonal meeting house of brick. Over the next century, the membership grew substantially and a larger building was needed. The present meeting house on High Street was built in 1783 in front of the old meeting house and cemetery. The cemetery predated the first building. A tablet commemorates that the Lenape chief King Ockanickon, a loyal friend of the English settlers, was buried here in 1681. The oldest gravestone is inscribed "D.B. 1726." Many notable Quakers are buried here.

One of the oldest buildings in Burlington is known as the Revell House. Originally built in 1685 for George Hutchinson, it stood on East Pearl Street. The property was purchased by Thomas Revell, one of the original Anglo-European settlers. Local tradition associates this house with the young Benjamin Franklin, who received gingerbread from the household while traveling from Boston to Philadelphia.

In the early 20th century, the house was purchased by the Annis Stockton Chapter of the Daughters of the American Revolution for use as their clubhouse. The Colonial Burlington Foundation acquired and restored it in the 1950s.

=== 18th century ===
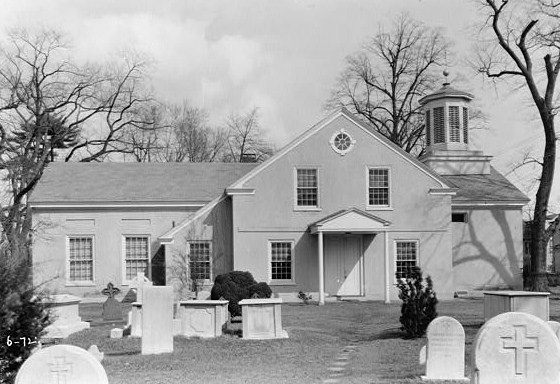
The original St. Mary's Episcopal church, built in 1703, the oldest church in New Jersey

Many institutions established in the 18th century continue to function in the 21st century. After the Quakers, the second oldest religious congregation in Burlington were the Anglicans (later known as Episcopalians). Their original church, Old St. Mary's, is the oldest church in Burlington and New Jersey. The congregation was founded in 1702 by George Keith and John Talbot. Talbot became the first minister and laid the cornerstone for the church in 1703. He served as the church's rector until 1725. The congregation prospered, and the church became the see of the Anglican bishops of New Jersey.

After the Revolution, the Episcopal Church in the United States was established. In 1846, under the leadership of Bishop and Rector George Washington Doane, construction was begun on New St. Mary's. This early Gothic Revival architecture church was designed by Richard Upjohn, who also designed Trinity Church at the foot of Wall Street in Lower Manhattan. In the late 20th century, this building was designated as a National Historic Landmark (NHL).

Bishop Doane founded an Episcopal girls' boarding school, St. Mary's, in Burlington in 1838, at a time when interest in girls' education led to development of schools for them in many areas. Girls from families up and down the East Coast came to study there, from as far as New England, Virginia, and upstate New York. St. Mary's provided a classical education, as well as classes in arts and music.

The Library Company of Burlington was organized in 1757 as a "free" library open to the public as well as members. There were 60 members of the original Library Company, each paying ten shillings per year to support the institution. The Library received a Charter from George II of Great Britain in 1758. The Library's books were kept in members' homes for a few years: Thomas Rodman's at 446 South High Street and, after 1767, Robert Smith's at 218 High Street. In 1789 the Library moved to its own building. In the early 21st century, the Library is housed in a stone building that was built on West Union Street in 1864. The Burlington Library is the oldest continuously operating library in New Jersey and the nation's seventh oldest.

The Endeavor Fire Company was organized in 1795. It was one of the four companies in the Burlington Fire Department when it was organized almost a century later. Endeavor was the first permanent firefighting organization in Burlington and remains one of the oldest fire companies under its original name in the state. By 1882, the company had relocated to its present building, which was erected in 1852 as a Market House.

Burlington has been the home of many notable people including John Lawrence, a politician and his son, Captain James Lawrence. The elder Lawrence served in the State Assembly, as Mayor of Burlington, New Jersey in 1769, and as a member of the Provincial Council from 1771 to 1775. He was suspected of being a Loyalist during the American Revolution, which ended his career. His son was born on October 1, 1781, and fought during the War of 1812. Lawyer and writer James Fenimore Cooper, who wrote The Last of the Mohicans, was also from Burlington. His father was a merchant there before buying land and developing Cooperstown, New York after the Revolution.

=== 19th century ===
As education for girls and young women became emphasized in the 19th century, Bishop George Washington Doane founded St. Mary's Hall in 1837 in association with the Episcopal diocese as the first Episcopal boarding school offering a classical education for girls and the first such school in New Jersey. In the 20th century, a boys' school was added. It is now known as Doane Academy and is a private, co-educational school for grades from Pre-K through 12th.

The building at 301 High Street houses the oldest continuously operating pharmacy in New Jersey. Originally a dwelling, the ground floor was converted to commercial use around 1845 by William Allinson, a druggist, local historian, and leading Quaker abolitionist. He used the building as a center of anti-slavery activity. John Greenleaf Whittier denounced slavery from the doorstep, and local tradition holds that fugitive slaves hid in tunnels under the building in their passage on the Underground Railroad. New Jersey ended slavery, but many fugitives wanted to go farther north, beyond the reach of slave catchers.

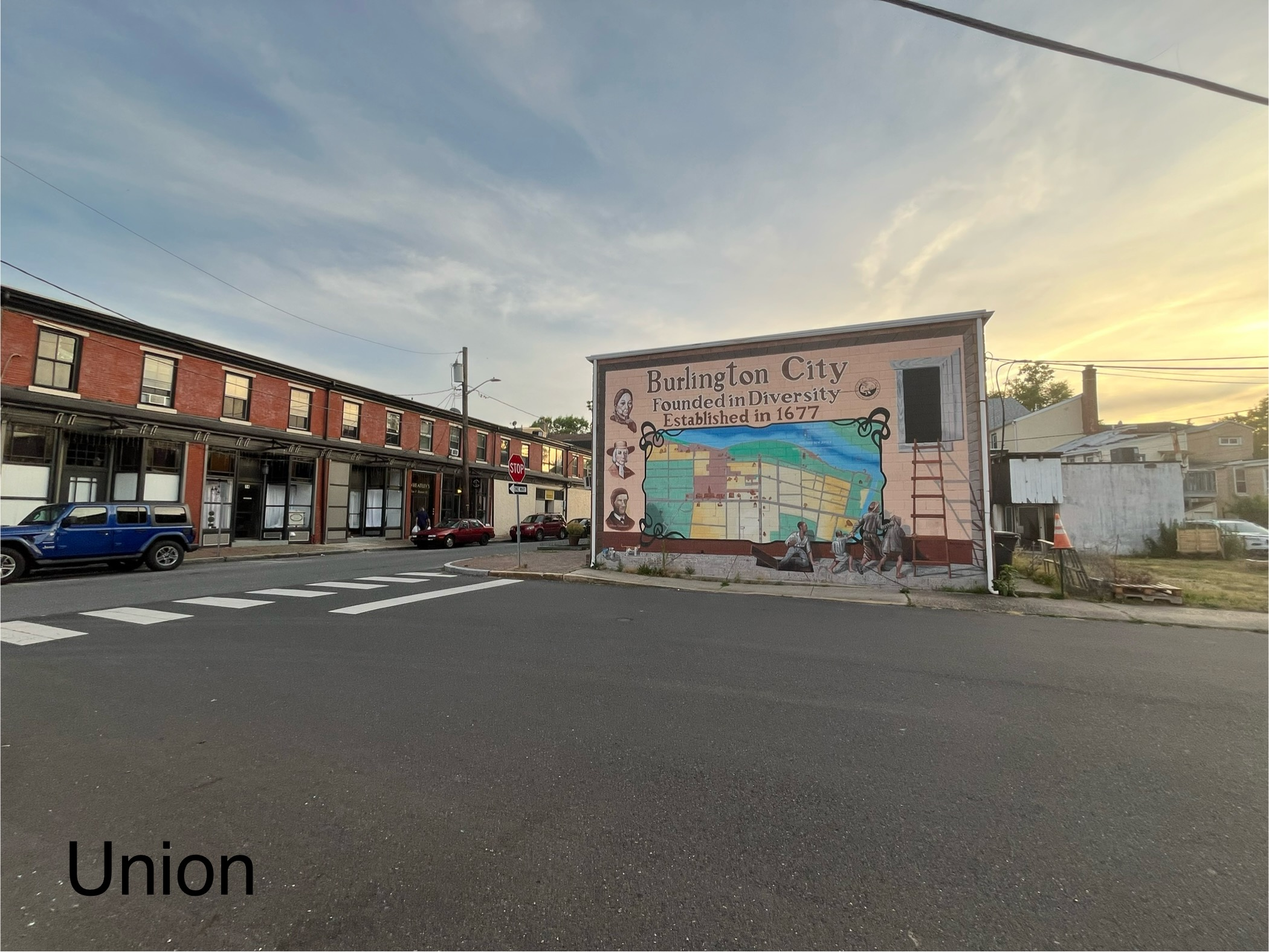
A building painting of the underground railroad off Union Street

During the 19th century, Burlington City was known for the quality and quantity of its manufacturing. The shoe industry rivaled shipbuilding and canning in prominence. The 1850 United States census indicates that the largest number of men were employed in the shoe industry, followed closely by carpentry and bricklaying. J. Frank Budd got his start in the shoe business at a Burlington shoe company just after the Civil War. In 1887, J.F. Budd broke ground for a children's "shoeworks" at the corner of Penn and Dilwyn streets. The company employed approximately 325 people and operated six days a week for ten hours a day. The J.F. Budd Baby Shoe Company billed itself as the "largest baby shoe plant in the world."

The commercial activity provided revenues for the city's cultural activity. In 1839, a Lyceum was erected as a venue for lectures, concerts, and public meetings. It served in that capacity until 1851, when it was turned over to the city to be used as the City Hall. The municipal offices' move was concurrent with the adoption of a new City charter.

The Oneida Boat Club was organized in 1873 by a group of 10 members. It is named for one of the original Five Nations of the Iroquois Confederacy, based in New York. Over the next few years, membership in the club grew rapidly. In 1876, they dedicated their newly built clubhouse on the banks of the Delaware River at York Street. The Oneida is the oldest continuously operating boat club located on the Delaware River.

During the 19th century, the City of Burlington developed in a grid pattern from the main crossroads of High and Broad streets. Blocks of attached rowhouses built in the latest architectural style characterize the city as a 19th-century town. Ferries carried traffic across the Delaware River to Pennsylvania before bridges were built.

=== 20th century ===
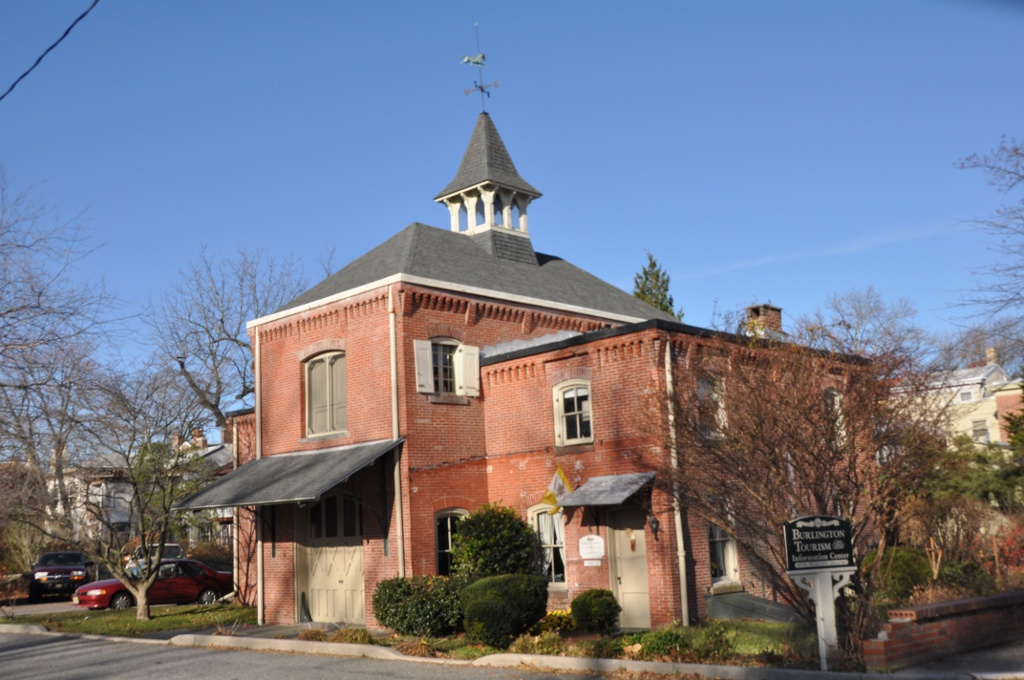
This historic carriage house now houses the local tourism office in Burlington.

Burlington's waterfront park along the river was developed as a result of urban renewal and flood control projects in the late 1960s and 1970s. The shoreline improvements—revetments, walkways, etc.—span the city's Delaware riverfront from the Burlington-Bristol Bridge to Assiscunk Creek.

The remains of former waterfront industries, ferry terminals, and docks were demolished. Development of an open, grassy park with a tree-lined waterfront esplanade has reconnected city residents to the riverfront for recreation. This also ensures that business properties are not at risk during floods and reduces damages.

In this period, the United States federal and state governments began to value their historic assets more highly, and efforts were made to preserve structures that were significant to the layered history of places. In addition to recognition of individual structures, such as the National Historic Landmark St. Mary's Church, the city has two historic districts listed on the National Register of Historic Places, with multiple contributing buildings: the Burlington Historic District includes structures from both the eighteenth and nineteenth centuries. It is adjacent to the city's High Street Historic District.

The Oneida Clubhouse narrowly escaped demolition during the urban renewal campaign. It was saved and renovated. As the new esplanade was built on fill that added land between the building and river's edge, it created a landlocked clubhouse for the boat club.

Burlington Coat Factory was founded in 1924 as a wholesaler of ladies' coats and outerwear. The modern company was formed in 1972 when Monroe Milstein purchased a warehouse in the outskirts of the city of Burlington. He started selling coats and outerwear there at discount prices. The company gradually added other apparel, including suits, shoes, and accessories, and has branched out to include baby items and linens, all at discount prices. The company's corporate headquarters was moved from the city to Burlington Township in 1988. The Burlington Coat Factory relocated to a new store site in the fall of 2008.

== Geography ==
According to the United States Census Bureau, the city had a total area of 3.78 square miles (9.79 km^{2}), including 3.06 square miles (7.93 km^{2}) of land and 0.72 square miles (1.87 km^{2}) of water (19.05%).

Unincorporated communities, localities and place names located partially or completely within the city include Burlington Island and East Burlington.

Burlington borders Burlington Township in Burlington County and both Bristol and Bristol Township across the Delaware River in Pennsylvania.

The Burlington-Bristol Bridge crosses the Delaware River, connecting Burlington to Bristol.

== Demographics ==
Historical population
Census	Pop.	Note	%±
1850	4,536		—
1860	5,174		14.1%
1870	5,817		12.4%
1880	6,090		4.7%
1890	7,264		19.3%
1900	7,392		1.8%
1910	8,336		12.8%
1920	9,049		8.6%
1930	10,844		19.8%
1940	10,905		0.6%
1950	12,051		10.5%
1960	12,687		5.3%
1970	12,010		−5.3%
1980	10,246		−14.7%
1990	9,835		−4.0%
2000	9,736		−1.0%
2010	9,920		1.9%
2020	9,743		−1.8%
2023 (est.)	10,024		2.9%
Population sources: 1850–2000 1850–1920; 1850–1890 1850–1870; 1850 1870 1880–1890; 1890–1910 1850–1930; 1940–2000 2000; 2010 2020

=== 2020 census ===
As of the 2020 census, Burlington had a population of 9,743. The median age was 39.2 years. 21.3% of residents were under the age of 18 and 16.3% of residents were 65 years of age or older. For every 100 females there were 93.1 males, and for every 100 females age 18 and over there were 90.1 males age 18 and over.

100.0% of residents lived in urban areas, while 0.0% lived in rural areas.

There were 4,004 households in Burlington, of which 28.2% had children under the age of 18 living in them. Of all households, 34.0% were married-couple households, 22.6% were households with a male householder and no spouse or partner present, and 34.9% were households with a female householder and no spouse or partner present. About 33.4% of all households were made up of individuals and 13.7% had someone living alone who was 65 years of age or older.

There were 4,500 housing units, of which 11.0% were vacant. The homeowner vacancy rate was 4.7% and the rental vacancy rate was 6.9%.

Racial composition as of the 2020 census
Race	Number	Percent
White	4,587	47.1%
Black or African American	3,547	36.4%
American Indian and Alaska Native	30	0.3%
Asian	231	2.4%
Native Hawaiian and Other Pacific Islander	3	0.0%
Some other race	478	4.9%
Two or more races	867	8.9%
Hispanic or Latino (of any race)	1,098	11.3%

=== 2010 census ===
The 2010 United States census counted 9,920 people, 3,858 households, and 2,438 families in the city. The population density was 3,239.1 per square mile (1,250.6/km^{2}). There were 4,223 housing units at an average density of 1,378.9 per square mile (532.4/km^{2}). The racial makeup was 58.92% (5,845) White, 32.98% (3,272) Black or African American, 0.18% (18) Native American, 2.03% (201) Asian, 0.04% (4) Pacific Islander, 2.29% (227) from other races, and 3.56% (353) from two or more races. Hispanic or Latino of any race were 6.50% (645) of the population.

Of the 3,858 households, 27.3% had children under the age of 18; 37.6% were married couples living together; 20.0% had a female householder with no husband present and 36.8% were non-families. Of all households, 30.8% were made up of individuals and 13.9% had someone living alone who was 65 years of age or older. The average household size was 2.53 and the average family size was 3.18.

23.9% of the population were under the age of 18, 8.6% from 18 to 24, 25.5% from 25 to 44, 26.4% from 45 to 64, and 15.7% who were 65 years of age or older. The median age was 38.9 years. For every 100 females, the population had 87.7 males. For every 100 females ages 18 and older there were 83.8 males.

The Census Bureau's 2006–2010 American Community Survey showed that (in 2010 inflation-adjusted dollars) median household income was $48,317 (with a margin of error of +/− $3,334) and the median family income was $62,049 (+/− $6,446). Males had a median income of $43,146 (+/− $7,469) versus $40,929 (+/− $3,562) for females. The per capita income for the borough was $24,612 (+/− $1,541). About 10.6% of families and 11.8% of the population were below the poverty line, including 13.0% of those under age 18 and 7.4% of those age 65 or over.

=== 2000 census ===
As of the 2000 United States census there were 9,736 people, 3,898 households, and 2,522 families residing in the city. The population density was 3,245.1 inhabitants per square mile (1,252.9/km^{2}). There were 4,181 housing units at an average density of 1,393.6 per square mile (538.1/km^{2}). The racial makeup of the city was 68.18% White, 26.62% African American, 0.27% Native American, 1.28% Asian, 0.01% Pacific Islander, 1.29% from other races, and 2.34% from two or more races. Hispanic or Latino of any race were 3.41% of the population.

There were 3,898 households, out of which 27.8% had children under the age of 18 living with them, 41.6% were married couples living together, 17.8% had a female householder with no husband present, and 35.3% were non-families. 29.9% of all households were made up of individuals, and 14.3% had someone living alone who was 65 years of age or older. The average household size was 2.48 and the average family size was 3.09.

In the city the population was spread out, with 23.9% under the age of 18, 7.7% from 18 to 24, 29.8% from 25 to 44, 21.8% from 45 to 64, and 16.8% who were 65 years of age or older. The median age was 38 years. For every 100 females, there were 90.2 males. For every 100 females age 18 and over, there were 84.3 males.

The median income for a household in the city was $43,115, and the median income for a family was $47,969. Males had a median income of $38,012 versus $28,022 for females. The per capita income for the city was $20,208. About 5.4% of families and 8.0% of the population were below the poverty line, including 11.2% of those under age 18 and 7.0% of those age 65 or over.

== Government ==
=== Local government ===
The City of Burlington is governed within the Faulkner Act (formally known as the Optional Municipal Charter Law) under the Mayor-Council form of municipal government (Plan 4), implemented based on the recommendations of a Charter Study Commission as of January 1, 1992. The city is one of 42 municipalities (of the 564) statewide that use this form of government. The governing body is comprised of the Mayor and the seven-member Common Council, all elected on a partisan basis in balloting held in odd-numbered years as part of the November general election. The Mayor serves a four-year term of office. The Common Council is comprised of seven members, each serving four-year terms of office: three at-large Councilmembers are elected to represent the entire city, while four are elected from single-member districts, known as wards. The three at-large and mayoral seats are up for election in one cycle, and the ward seats are elected together two years later.

As of 2024, the Mayor of Burlington City is Democrat Barry W. Conaway, whose term of office ends December 31, 2027. Members of the Common Council are David H. Ballard (at-large; D, 2027), Dawn Bergner-Thompson (Ward 3; D, 2025 - elected to an unexpired term), George Chachis (Ward 1; D, 2025), Geneva Rijs (Ward 2; D, 2025 - appointed to serve an unexpired term), Xavier Roque (Ward 4; D, 2025), Richard Spaulding (at-large; D, 2027) and Suzanne Johnson Woodard (at-large; D, 2027).

In February 2024, the common council appointed Geneva Rijs to fill the Ward 2 seat expiring in December 2025 that had been held by J. Roosevelt Smith until he resigned from office the previous month; Rijs will serve on an interim basis until the November 2024 general election, when voters will choose a candidate to serve the balance of the term of office.

In April 2022, Dawn Bergner-Thompson was appointed to the Ward 3 seat expiring in December 2025 that had been held by Helen Hatala until she died the previous month. Bergner-Thompson served on an interim basis until the November 2022 general election, when she was elected to serve the balance of the term of office.

In January 2016, the City Council appointed George Chachis to fill the Ward 1 seat expiring in 2017 that had been held by Barry Conaway until he was appointed as mayor.

=== Federal, state and county representation ===
Burlington City is located in New Jersey's 3rd congressional district. It is part of New Jersey's 7th state legislative district.

For the 119th United States Congress, New Jersey's 3rd congressional district is currently represented Herb Conaway (D, Delran Township). New Jersey is represented in the United States Senate by Democrats Cory Booker (Newark, term ends 2027) and Andy Kim (Moorestown, term ends 2031).

For the 2026–2027 session, the 7th legislative district of the New Jersey Legislature is represented in the State Senate by Troy Singleton (D, Palmyra) and in the General Assembly by Carol A. Murphy (D, Mount Laurel) and Balvir Singh (D, Burlington Township).

Burlington County is governed by a Board of County Commissioners comprised of five members who are chosen at-large in partisan elections to serve three-year terms of office on a staggered basis, with either one or two seats coming up for election each year; at an annual reorganization meeting, the board selects a director and deputy director from among its members to serve a one-year term. As of 2026, Burlington County's Commissioners are: Director Felicia Hopson (D, Willingboro Township, term as commissioner ends December 31, 2027; term as director ends 2026), Deputy Director Allison Eckel (D, Medford, term as commissioner ends 2028; term as deputy director ends 2026), Randy Brolo (D, Lumberton, 2026; elected to an unexpired term), Tyler Burrell (D, Delran Township, 2027) and Tom Pullion (D, Edgewater Park, 2026).

Burlington County's constitutional officers are Clerk Joanne Schwartz (D, Southampton Township, 2028), Sheriff James H. Kostoplis (D, Bordentown, 2028) and Surrogate Brian J. Carlin (D, Burlington Township, 2026).

=== Politics ===
United States presidential election results for Burlington 2024 2020 2016 2012 2008 2004
Year	Republican		Democratic		Third party(ies)	
Year	No.	%	No.	%	No.	%
2024	1,271	29.73%	2,938	68.73%	66	1.54%
2020	1,406	29.62%	3,294	69.39%	47	0.99%
2016	1,244	30.07%	2,757	66.64%	136	3.29%
2012	1,146	26.53%	3,138	72.66%	35	0.81%
2008	1,308	28.14%	3,285	70.68%	55	1.18%
2004	1,486	34.22%	2,819	64.92%	37	0.85%

As of March 2011, there were a total of 5,765 registered voters in Burlington City, of which 2,813 (48.8% vs. 33.3% countywide) were registered as Democrats, 795 (13.8% vs. 23.9%) were registered as Republicans and 2,150 (37.3% vs. 42.8%) were registered as Unaffiliated. There were 7 voters registered as Libertarians or Greens. Among the city's 2010 Census population, 58.1% (vs. 61.7% in Burlington County) were registered to vote, including 76.4% of those ages 18 and over (vs. 80.3% countywide).

Gubernatorial election results for Burlington
Year	Republican		Democratic		Third party(ies)	
Year	No.	%	No.	%	No.	%
2025	878	26.57%	2,402	72.68%	25	0.76%
2021	931	36.50%	1,596	62.56%	24	0.94%
2017	703	30.57%	1,540	66.96%	57	2.48%
2013	1,422	51.97%	1,284	46.93%	30	1.10%
2009	881	32.87%	1,622	60.52%	177	6.60%
2005	905	30.73%	1,900	64.52%	140	4.75%

In the 2012 presidential election, Democrat Barack Obama received 3,138 votes here (72.0% vs. 58.1% countywide), ahead of Republican Mitt Romney with 1,146 votes (26.3% vs. 40.2%) and other candidates with 35 votes (0.8% vs. 1.0%), among the 4,356 ballots cast by the city's 6,097 registered voters, for a turnout of 71.4% (vs. 74.5% in Burlington County). In the 2008 presidential election, Democrat Barack Obama received 3,285 votes here (69.9% vs. 58.4% countywide), ahead of Republican John McCain with 1,308 votes (27.8% vs. 39.9%) and other candidates with 55 votes (1.2% vs. 1.0%), among the 4,697 ballots cast by the city's 6,117 registered voters, for a turnout of 76.8% (vs. 80.0% in Burlington County). In the 2004 presidential election, Democrat John Kerry received 2,819 votes here (64.2% vs. 52.9% countywide), ahead of Republican George W. Bush with 1,486 votes (33.8% vs. 46.0%) and other candidates with 37 votes (0.8% vs. 0.8%), among the 4,390 ballots cast by the city's 5,832 registered voters, for a turnout of 75.3% (vs. 78.8% in the whole county).

In the 2013 gubernatorial election, Republican Chris Christie received 1,422 votes here (50.9% vs. 61.4% countywide), ahead of Democrat Barbara Buono with 1,284 votes (46.0% vs. 35.8%) and other candidates with 30 votes (1.1% vs. 1.2%), among the 2,793 ballots cast by the city's 6,115 registered voters, yielding a 45.7% turnout (vs. 44.5% in the county). In the 2009 gubernatorial election, Democrat Jon Corzine received 1,622 ballots cast (59.6% vs. 44.5% countywide), ahead of Republican Chris Christie with 881 votes (32.4% vs. 47.7%), Independent Chris Daggett with 129 votes (4.7% vs. 4.8%) and other candidates with 48 votes (1.8% vs. 1.2%), among the 2,723 ballots cast by the city's 6,010 registered voters, yielding a 45.3% turnout (vs. 44.9% in the county).

United States Senate election results for Burlington1
Year	Republican		Democratic		Third party(ies)	
Year	No.	%	No.	%	No.	%
2024	992	24.49%	2,952	72.87%	107	2.64%
2018	1,078	32.26%	2,028	60.68%	236	7.06%
2012	1,029	25.17%	3,017	73.78%	43	1.05%
2006	870	33.87%	1,633	63.57%	66	2.57%

United States Senate election results for Burlington2
Year	Republican		Democratic		Third party(ies)	
Year	No.	%	No.	%	No.	%
2020	1,284	27.91%	3,233	70.27%	84	1.83%
2014	688	28.87%	1,648	69.16%	47	1.97%
2013	449	29.56%	1,046	68.86%	24	1.58%
2008	1,114	26.83%	2,928	70.52%	110	2.65%

== Education ==
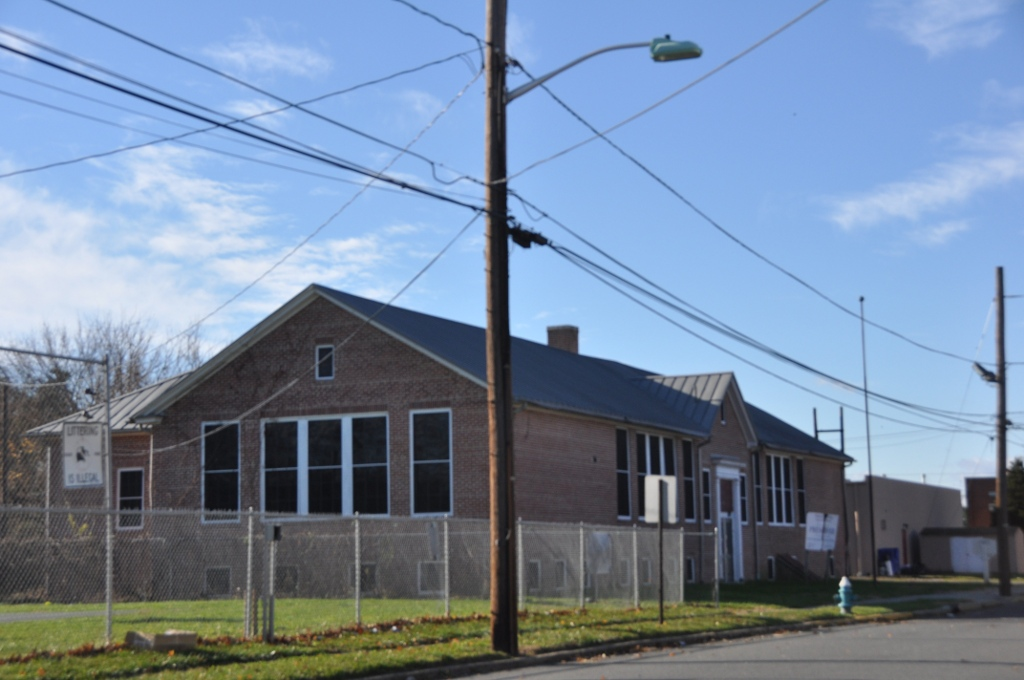
The historic William R. Allen School was originally built for the education of black children.

The City of Burlington Public School District serves students in pre-kindergarten through twelfth grade. The district is one of 31 former Abbott districts statewide that were established pursuant to the decision by the New Jersey Supreme Court in Abbott v. Burke which are now referred to as "SDA Districts" based on the requirement for the state to cover all costs for school building and renovation projects in these districts under the supervision of the New Jersey Schools Development Authority. As of the 2020–21 school year, the district, comprised of four schools, had an enrollment of 1,740 students and 170.9 classroom teachers (on an FTE basis), for a student–teacher ratio of 10.2:1. The schools in the district (with 2020–21 enrollment data from the National Center for Education Statistics) are Captain James Lawrence Elementary School with 238 students in grades Pre-K–2, Samuel Smith Elementary School with 281 students in grades Pre-K–2, Wilbur Watts Intermediate School with 444 students in grades 3–6 and Burlington City High School with 727 students in grades 7–12. In 2018, the district closed Elias Boudinot Elementary School, which had served grades K–2, citing declining enrollment, the opportunities to reduce costs and the potential to raise funds by selling the site. The district's high school serves as a receiving school for students in grade nine through twelve from Edgewater Park Township, as part of a sending/receiving relationship with the Edgewater Park School District.

Students from Burlington City, and from all of Burlington County, are eligible to attend the Burlington County Institute of Technology, a countywide public school district that serves the vocational and technical education needs of students at the high school and post-secondary level at its campuses in Medford and Westampton.

Doane Academy, a co-educational, Episcopal college-preparatory school, was founded as St. Mary's Hall, a boarding school for girls, by George Washington Doane in 1837. The name was shortened from St. Mary's Hall-Doane Academy in March 2008. All Saints Catholic Grade School (Pre-K though 8th grade) closed in June 2006 with several other Catholic schools in the Roman Catholic Diocese of Trenton due to low enrollment, after 75 years of operation, based on recommendations issued in 2005 to help improve diocese finances.

St. Paul Grammar School serves students in grades PreK-8 and operates under the auspices of the Roman Catholic Diocese of Trenton.

== Transportation ==
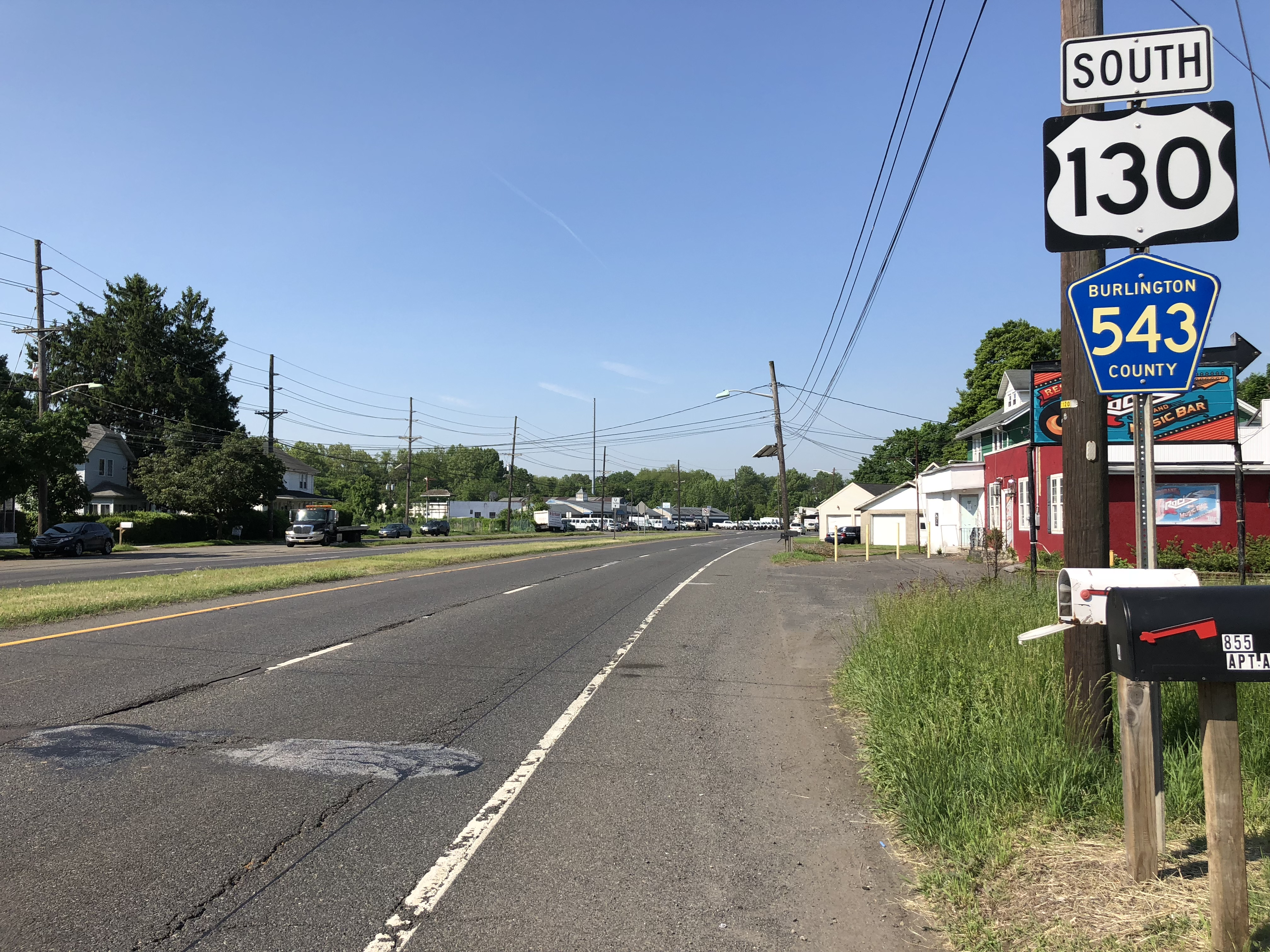
U.S. Route 130 and County Route 543 in Burlington

=== Roads and highways ===
As of May 2010, the city had a total of 42.76 miles (68.82 km) of roadways, of which 35.71 miles (57.47 km) were maintained by the municipality, 4.36 miles (7.02 km) by Burlington County, 2.30 miles (3.70 km) by the New Jersey Department of Transportation, and 0.39 miles (0.63 km) by the Burlington County Bridge Commission.

Main roads directly serving Burlington include U.S. Route 130, New Jersey Route 413, County Route 541 and County Route 543. Interstate 95, Interstate 295 and the New Jersey Turnpike all pass fairly close to the city and are easily accessible from Burlington.

The Burlington-Bristol Bridge, part of Route 413, crosses the Delaware River, connecting Burlington to Bristol Township, Pennsylvania, and is operated by the Burlington County Bridge Commission. Construction of the bridge started on April 1, 1930, and the bridge opened to traffic on May 1, 1931. The bridge carries NJ 413 and Pennsylvania Route 413.

=== Public transportation ===
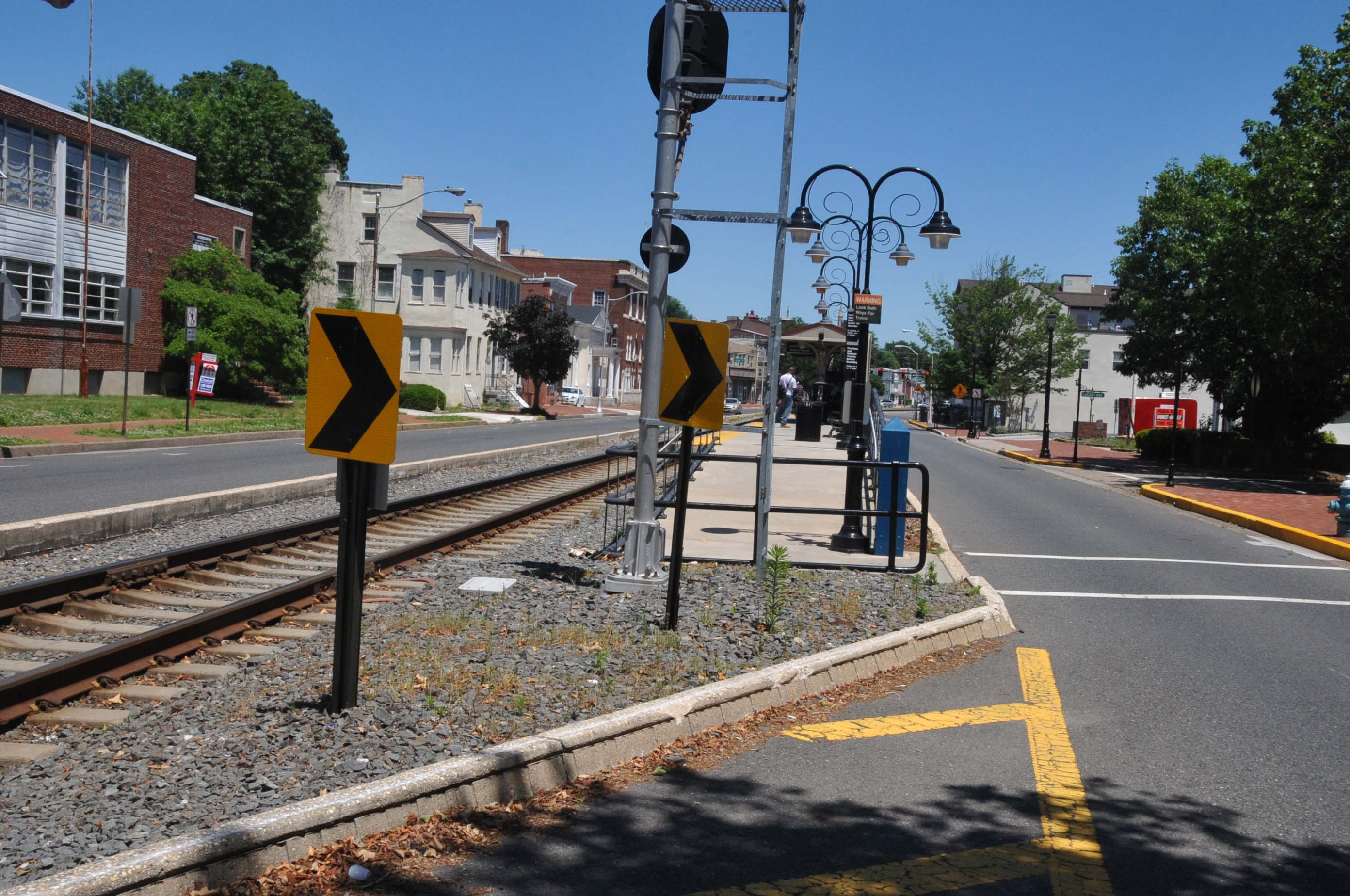
River Line

NJ Transit provides bus service in the city between Trenton and Philadelphia on the 409 and 418 routes and between Burlington and Camden on the 413 and 419 routes.

The NJ River Line light rail system provides transportation between the Trenton Transit Center in Trenton and the Walter Rand Transportation Center (and other stations) in Camden, with stops at Burlington South and Burlington Towne Centre.

== Points of interest ==
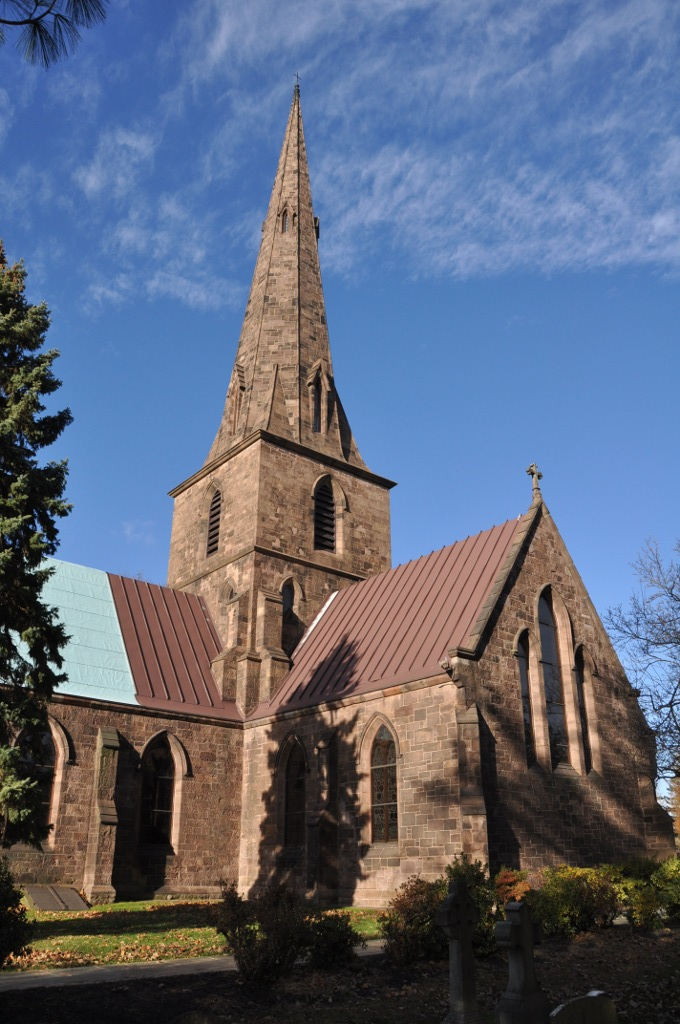
The new St. Mary's Church is a national historic landmark.

- Burlington Island, an island in the Delaware River between Burlington and Bristol, Pennsylvania. Plans were announced in 2012 to create an historic amusement park on the site.
- Doane Academy
- Elias Boudinot House – located at 207 W. Broad Street.
- James Lawrence House – located at 459 High Street and constructed in 1742, it was the home of the hero of the War of 1812, whose dying command has been paraphrased as "Don't give up the ship!".
- James Fenimore Cooper House
- Library Company of Burlington
- Odd Fellows Cemetery, at 4527 Route 130 South
- Old City Hall
- Quaker Meeting House
- Revell House
- St. Mary's Episcopal Church – the congregation's original church was constructed in 1703 and a new church building was added in 1854. The church's new building was added to the National Register of Historic Places in 1972 and was declared a National Historic Landmark in 1986.
- Waterfront Park and Oneida Boat Clubhouse – located at York Street on the Delaware riverfront, the club is the oldest continuously operated club on the river.

== Notable people ==
People who were born in, residents of, or otherwise closely associated with Burlington include:

- Eric Alejandro (born 1986), athlete representing Puerto Rico who competes mostly in the 400 meters hurdles
- Eddie Blair (1871–1913), football player / coach and physician, who was an early professional football player with the Latrobe Athletic Association
- Joseph Bloomfield (1753–1823), captain in Revolutionary War, New Jersey Attorney General, Chief Justice of the New Jersey Vice-Admiralty Court, president of the first Society for the Abolition of Slavery, Mayor from 1795 to 1800, Governor of New Jersey (1801–1802 and 1803–1812), a brigadier general in the War of 1812 and U.S. Representative from 1817 to 1821
- Elias Boudinot (1740–1821), President of the Continental Congress from 1782 to 1783
- William Bradford (1755–1795), fought in the American Revolution and became attorney general and justice of the Pennsylvania Supreme Court
- D'Lo Brown (born 1970), WWE Wrestler
- John L. Burns (1793–1872), veteran of the War of 1812, who at age 69 fought as a civilian combatant with the Union Army at the Battle of Gettysburg during the American Civil War.
- Cyrus Bustill (1732–1806), African-American brewer and baker, abolitionist and community leader
- Isaac Collins (1746–1817), King's Printer who printed colonial currency, almanacs and a quarto Bible far more error-free than most of its contemporary editions

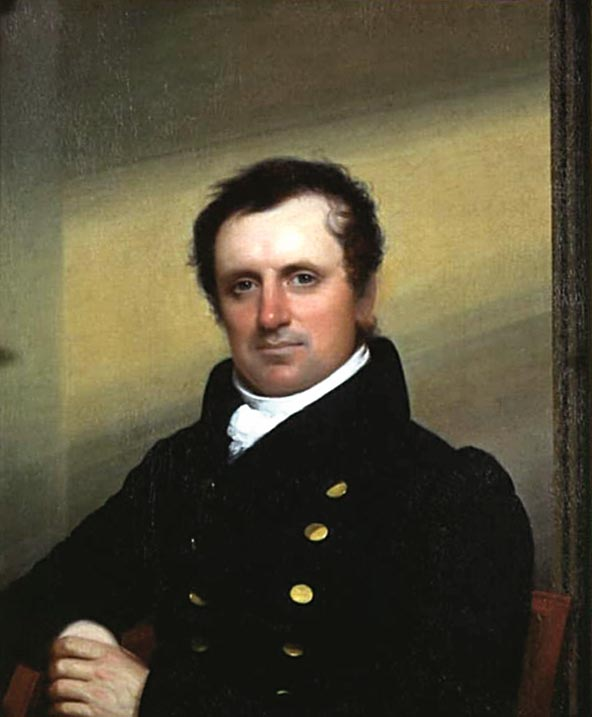
James Fenimore Cooper was born in Burlington.

- James Fenimore Cooper (1789–1851), novelist
- William Coxe Jr. (1762–1831), early pomologist who was a U.S. Representative from New Jersey from 1813 to 1815
- Oliver Cromwell (1752–1853), African-American soldier, who served with the 2nd New Jersey Regiment of the Continental Army during the American Revolutionary War
- George Washington Doane (1799–1859), established St. Mary's Hall and Burlington College
- Franklin D'Olier (1877–1953), first national commander of the American Legion
- Howard Eastwood (1884–1976), Justice of the New Jersey Supreme Court from 1946 to 1948
- Jehu Eyre (1738–1781), figure of the American Revolution
- Margaret Ellen Fox (born 1960), missing person who disappeared in the area, and whose case is still open
- William Franklin (1731–1813), estranged son of Benjamin Franklin and last colonial governor of New Jersey
- Ulysses S. Grant (1822–1885), Union Army general and the eighteenth President of the United States (1869–1877)
- Danny Green (1876–1914), early Major League Baseball outfielder who played for both Chicago baseball teams
- William Griffith (1766–1826), judge who served on the United States circuit court and was Mayor from 1824 to 1826
- Edward Burd Grubb Jr. (1841–1913), Civil War General and later United States Ambassador to Spain
- Edward Burd Grubb Sr. (1810–1867), ironmaster
- Ann Wood Henry (1734–1799), wife of William Henry, a gunsmith, inventor, and patriot in the American Revolution
- Ka'dar Hollman (born 1994), NFL cornerback for the Houston Texans
- Vanessa Kara (born 1996), professional soccer player who plays as a forward for National Women's Soccer League club Racing Louisville
- James Kinsey (1731–1803), lawyer who served in the Continental Congress and as Chief Justice of the New Jersey Supreme Court
- Dennis Landolt (born 1986), offensive tackle who has played in the NFL with the New York Jets
- James Lawrence (1781–1813), War of 1812 naval officer
- Joseph McIlvaine (1769–1826), United States Senator from New Jersey from 1823 until his death
- John Silva Meehan (1790–1863), publisher, printer and newspaper editor, who served as the fourth Librarian of Congress, from 1829 to 1861
- George Middleton (1800–1888), represented New Jersey's 2nd congressional district from 1863 to 1865
- Eddie Miksis (1926–2005), second baseman / outfielder who played for 14 seasons in Major League Baseball
- William Moraley (1699–1762), an indentured servant to Isaac Pearson in the eighteenth century who authored the book The Infortunate, about his experiences
- Alex Pitko (1914–2011), outfielder who played two seasons in Major League Baseball
- John H. Pugh (1827–1905), represented New Jersey's 2nd congressional district in the United States House of Representatives from 1877 to 1879
- Bowes Reed (1740–1794), lieutenant colonel in the New Jersey Militia who served as mayor of Burlington
- William R. Rockhill (1793–1865), politician who represented Indiana's 10th congressional district in the United States House of Representatives from 1847 to 1849
- Maria Rodriguez-Gregg (born 1981), politician who was the first Republican Hispanic woman to be elected to the New Jersey Legislature
- Balvir Singh, teacher at BCHS and politician who has represented the 7th Legislative District in the New Jersey General Assembly since 2025
- John Skene (died 1690), Deputy Governor of West Jersey who was the first Freemason in North America
- Richard Smith (1735–1803), member of the Continental Congress from 1774 to 1776
- Rod Streater (born 1988), NFL wide receiver for the Oakland Raiders
- Anthony Taylor (1837–1894), awarded the Medal of Honor for his actions during the Civil War
