= Bowes Reed =

American politician (1740–1794)

Bowes Reed (November 1740 – July 20, 1794) was an American Revolutionary War officer, politician, and public servant from New Jersey. He was the brother of Joseph Reed, a member of the Continental Congress and President of the Supreme Executive Council of Pennsylvania (equivalent to Governor).

== Early life and career ==
Reed was born in November 1740 in Trenton, New Jersey (then part of Hunterdon County) to Andrew Reed, a shopkeeper and merchant, and Theodosia Bowes. In 1767, he was appointed surrogate of Hunterdon County, and he later resided in Burlington. In 1773, he was licensed as an attorney-at-law, but he never became a counsellor.

== Career ==
In June 1776, at the beginning of the American Revolution, the Provincial Congress of New Jersey appointed Reed Lieutenant Colonel of the battalion to be raised in Gloucester, Salem, Cumberland and Burlington counties. One of his duties was the guarding of William Franklin, the last Colonial Governor of New Jersey, who had been taken prisoner. In September 1776, he was commissioned Colonel of the First Regiment of Burlington, resigning in March 1778.

Reed served in a number of other capacities during the Revolution. He was appointed Clerk of the Supreme Court of New Jersey in 1776, and he served as a Justice of the Peace of Burlington County from 1777 to 1779. In 1778, he was named Deputy Secretary of State of New Jersey, and later that year, upon the resignation of Charles Pettit (the husband of Reed's sister Sarah), he was elevated to the position of Secretary of State.

Reed continued as Secretary of State after the War, serving until his death in 1794. In 1784, the New Jersey Legislature appointed him Mayor of Burlington, New Jersey. He was reappointed in 1789 and served until his death.

== Personal life and death ==
By his first wife, Margaret Johnstone, Reed had four children:

- Maria Reed (born November 11, 1775, married Joseph McIlvaine, United States Senator from New Jersey)
- Charles Pettit Reed (born April 6, 1778)
- Ann Burnet Reed (October 31, 1784 – November 3, 1787)
- Margaret Reed (December 1786 – January 23, 1788)

After his first wife died during childbirth in December 1786, he married Caroline Moore, daughter of Dr. Alexander Moore of Bordentown. Caroline died on November 6, 1789.

Reed died on July 20, 1794, aged 53. The executors of his will were his brother-in-law Charles Pettit and his son-in-law Joseph McIlvaine; Joseph Bloomfield, later Governor of New Jersey, was one of the witnesses. Reed is buried in Saint Mary's Episcopal Churchyard, Burlington, New Jersey.

Political offices
Preceded by Charles Pettit	Secretary of State of New Jersey; 1778 – 1794	Succeeded by Samuel W. Stockton
