= William Henry (gunsmith) =

Pennsylvania delegate to the Continental Congress (1729–1786)

- Born: May 19, 1729; Downingtown, Pennsylvania
- Died: December 15, 1786 (aged 57); Lancaster, Pennsylvania
- Occupations: Inventor, gunsmith, American revolutionary
- Spouse: Ann Wood Henry
- Children: John Joseph Henry

William Henry (May 19, 1729 – December 15, 1786) was an American gunsmith, engineer, politician, and merchant from Lancaster, Pennsylvania, and a delegate for Pennsylvania to the Continental Congress in 1784, 1785, and 1786. Henry is also noted for his contributions in the development of the first steam engines.

== Biography ==
William Henry was born near Downingtown, Pennsylvania to a family of Scots-Irish extraction. Prior to his service in the Continental Congress, Henry was a gunsmith and provided rifles to the British during the French and Indian War: Henry himself, serving as armorer, accompanied troops on John Forbes's successful mission to retake Fort Duquesne in 1758. By 1760, according to Scott Paul Gordon, Henry had largely abandoned his occupation of gunsmith and had become a successful ironmonger and merchant in Lancaster.

Henry later served in many positions of public responsibility, including Assistant Commissary General to the Continental Army for the district of Lancaster and, in 1779, Commissary of Hides for Pennsylvania, Delaware, and Maryland. In these positions, Henry managed vast sums of money and acquired and transferred enormous amounts of material. (He was no longer producing guns, but he did acquire them—along with shoes, hats, flour—to supply them to state and continental troops.) In 1780 Henry informed Joseph Reed that he had "laid out…between Sixty & Seventy Thousand Pound" just to "purchase Leather and Paying Workmens Wages at the Shoe-Factory[s]" he had established "at Philadelphia, Allentown and Lancaster." His correspondence is filled with letters from Army leaders, including George Washington, begging for arms and other materials. Henry was the Treasurer of Lancaster Country for many years, a position filled by his wife, Ann Wood Henry, after Henry's death in 1786.

Henry was an intellectual who helped found Lancaster's Juliana Library-Company in 1759, which during the Revolution and after was housed in his residence, and he held membership in the American Philosophical Society in Philadelphia, whose first Transactions (1771) printed Henry's account of his invention of a "Description of a Self-Moving or Sentinel Register" to regulate the flue of a furnace. Henry invented a screw auger, manufactured and sold exclusively at his Lancaster store, and some credit him with inventing the steamboat: the twelve-year-old Robert Fulton, a Lancaster neighbor, visited Henry in 1777, who had been experimenting since 1763 on boats with steam engines on the Conestoga River (Fulton's own experiments began only in 1786 in England). Henry and his family were members of the Moravian Congregation at Lancaster.

Henry was the earliest patron of painter Benjamin West, who lodged in Henry's home in Lancaster in 1756 and painted portraits of William and Ann Henry, probably shortly after their marriage. More significantly, Henry encouraged West to paint The Death of Socrates (1756), perhaps the first history painting produced in the colonies; West credited Henry with having initiated the painter's interest in history painting, the genre for which the painter became famous.

== Legacy ==
Henry's sons carried on his gun business, in Lancaster, in Philadelphia, in Nazareth, Pennsylvania, and then in Boulton, PA. One of his sons, John Joseph Henry, served as a sixteen-year-old rifleman on Benedict Arnold's march on Quebec in the fall and winter of 1775 (he was captured and imprisoned for much of 1776), and later served as president judge of the second District in Pennsylvania from 1795 to 1811.

== See also ==
- Gelelemend
