= George M. Robeson =

American politician (1829–1897)

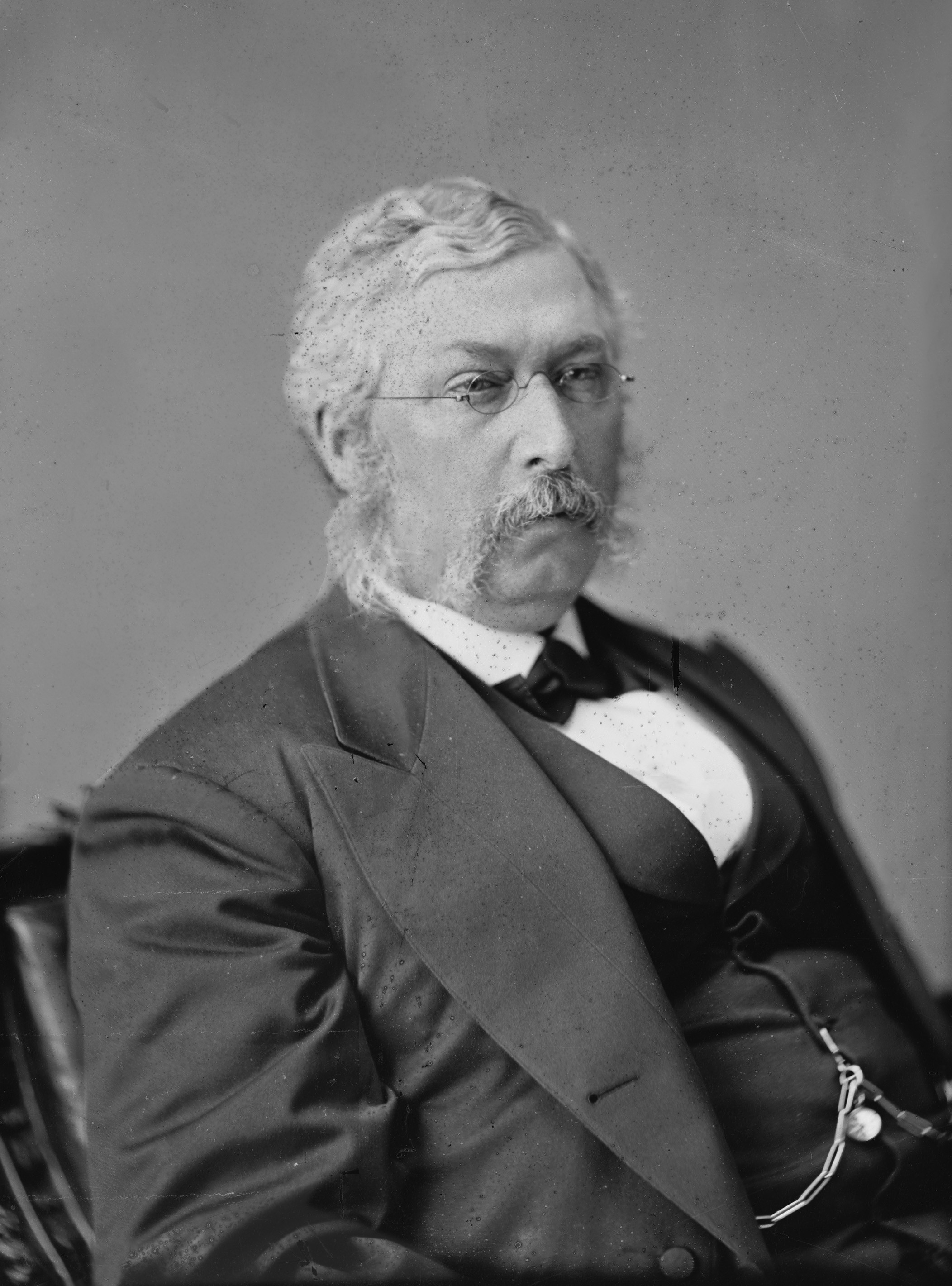

Chairman of the House Republican Conference
- In office March 4, 1881 – March 3, 1883
- Speaker: J. Warren Keifer
- Preceded by: William P. Frye
- Succeeded by: Joseph G. Cannon

Member of the U.S. House of Representatives from New Jersey's 1st district
- In office March 4, 1879 – March 3, 1883
- Preceded by: Clement Hall Sinnickson
- Succeeded by: Thomas M. Ferrell

26th United States Secretary of the Navy
- In office June 25, 1869 – March 12, 1877
- President: Ulysses S. Grant
- Preceded by: Adolph E. Borie
- Succeeded by: Richard W. Thompson

Attorney General of New Jersey
- In office 1867–1869
- Governor: Marcus Lawrence Ward
- Preceded by: Frederick Frelinghuysen
- Succeeded by: Robert Gilchrist Jr.

Personal details
- Born: George Maxwell Robeson; March 16, 1829 Oxford Furnace, New Jersey, U.S.
- Died: September 27, 1897 (aged 68) Trenton, New Jersey, U.S.
- Resting place: Belvidere Cemetery in Belvidere, New Jersey
- Party: Republican
- Education: College of New Jersey (BA)

Military service
- Allegiance: United States
- Branch/service: United States Army
- Rank: Brigadier General
- Unit: New Jersey Militia
- Battles/wars: American Civil War

George Maxwell Robeson (March 16, 1829 – September 27, 1897) was an American politician and lawyer from New Jersey. He served as Attorney General for the State of New Jersey from 1867 to 1869, until being appointed as Secretary of the Navy by President Ulysses S. Grant, in 1869, remaining in that post until 1877. A member of the Republican Party, he also served two terms as a U.S. Representative for New Jersey from 1879 to 1883.

== Early life ==
George M. Robeson was born on March 16, 1829, in Oxford Furnace, New Jersey, near Belvidere in Warren County. Robeson's family was of Scottish origin, and was long-established in New Jersey; he was a descendant of Andrew Robeson, who served as surveyor-general of New Jersey in 1668. His father was Philadelphia Judge William Penn Robeson and his mother was the daughter of U.S. Congressman George C. Maxwell, who served in the 12th U.S. Congress from 1811 to 1813 representing Hunterdon, New Jersey. His brother William P. Robeson Jr. was a brevetted Brigadier general in the Union Army. Robeson was the nephew of U.S. Congressman John Patterson Bryan Maxwell.

Robeson received a bachelor's degree from the College of New Jersey (now Princeton University) at the age of 18 in 1847. Upon graduation, he studied law in Newark in former New Jersey Chief Justice Joseph C. Hornblower's law office. Hornblower, at the time, was involved in an abortive attempt to create a law school at the College of New Jersey; it is not clear whether Robeson's continuing education was related to this effort, but in any case, Robeson received a master's degree from the college in 1850, and was admitted to the bar in the same year. He was admitted as a legal counselor in 1854. He initially set up his law practice in Newark, but then moved his practice to Jersey City. In 1858, he was appointed public prosecutor for Camden County.

== Civil War ==
By the outbreak of the Civil War Robeson had become associated with the Republican party. During the war he served on the state's Sanitary Commission and worked at recruiting and organizing troops for the New Jersey militia. For this latter work, late in the war he was given a commission as a brigadier general in the New Jersey Militia by Gov. Joel Parker; this appointment was essentially ceremonial, and did not involve service on active duty during the war.

== Attorney General of New Jersey (1867–1869) ==
Robeson was appointed Attorney General of New Jersey by Gov. Marcus L. Ward in 1867. Perhaps the most significant event of Robeson's relatively short career as Attorney General was his prosecution of Bridget Durgan, a young Irish immigrant working as a maid, for the murder of Mary Ellen Coriell, wife of her employer. Robeson was able to gain a conviction of Durgan on circumstantial evidence, persuading the jury not to factor in Durgan's age and gender during their deliberations. The jury took only one hour to convict Durgan of murder, and sentenced her to death. Robeson gained national attention for securing a death sentence for a young woman, something that 19th-century juries were reluctant to specify. Durgan was hanged on August 30.

Robeson resigned as attorney general on June 22, 1869, to become United States Secretary of the Navy.

== Secretary of the Navy (1869–1877) ==
On June 25, 1869, President Ulysses S. Grant appointed Robeson Secretary of the Navy, replacing Adolph E. Borie, who had resigned earlier that same day. Borie had found the duties of running the Navy Department demanding, and had apparently never particularly wanted the job anyway; one source suggests that he had taken the job as a courtesy to Grant for having offered it, and had spent his weeks in office simply waiting for an appropriate moment to resign. Robeson's appointment to the position was pushed by New Jersey Senator Alexander G. Cattell. The change came as a surprise to the general public, all the more so because Robeson was, at the time, largely unknown outside of New Jersey. He ended up serving in the position from June 26, 1869, until March 12, 1877, making him one of the longest-serving Naval secretaries of the 19th century, second only to Lincoln's secretary, Gideon Welles. Robeson came to the job with no previous experience related to maritime matters.

As a cabinet member Robeson expressed support for the administration's reconstruction policies, including emancipation and granting of citizenship, complete with voting rights, for African-Americans. During an 1870 speech in Norfolk, Virginia, a very strong expression of such support—perhaps ill-advised in a Southern city—helped start a riot, involving, at first, the throwing of eggs at Robeson, and later gunfire. He filled in for Grant at certain public events, notably the 1873 dedication of a site in Philadelphia for the Centennial Exposition, which was successfully staged in 1876—Later, in 1874, he supported Senate Bill S.617, dubbed the "inflation bill," under which $400 million in greenbacks (paper currency) was to be placed into circulation, along with an equivalent amount of specie-backed money. Both houses overwhelming approved the bill, and Grant was expected to quickly sign it. However, after some deliberation, the President vetoed the bill, and an attempt to override the veto failed in the Senate.

=== Departmental control (1869) ===
Robeson's predecessor, Adolph Borie, had had little interest in running the Navy Department and let the service's seniormost uniformed officer, Vice Admiral David Dixon Porter, exercise unprecedented authority over the department. Porter proved to be an autocratic administrator, and caused considerable mischief during Borie's 14-week tenure at the department. One particularly controversial move involved changing a long-standing interpretation of a law defining the rank and standing of non-line officers within the navy, effectively demoting all these officers by one or more ranks so that all would be outranked by all line officers with comparable seniority. This would cause bitterness and have an adverse effect on the development of engineering and other specializations within the navy for decades to come.

Soon after his appointment Robeson took steps to rein in Porter. Porter was discouraged from appearing personally at the Navy Department Office building, only visiting four times during Robeson's tenure. On November 16, 1870, Robeson wrote Porter a letter outlining the limits on Porter's authority, and ordering the admiral to report regularly to Robeson's Naval Office in writing. Porter became a staunch critic of Robeson for the remainder of his career, accusing him of corruption on a massive scale; nonetheless, on many policy matters (notably on the proper organization of the force, around monitors for coast defense and unarmored sailing vessels with auxiliary steam power for high-seas commerce raiding) the two had similar ideas, and Robeson's first annual report to Congress in 1869 reflected many of the ideas of Porter. Porter's influence would decline over time, while that of Rear Admiral Daniel Ammen, a close friend to President Grant, would increase.

=== Exploration ===
==== Arctic Exploration: the Polaris Expedition (1871-1873) ====
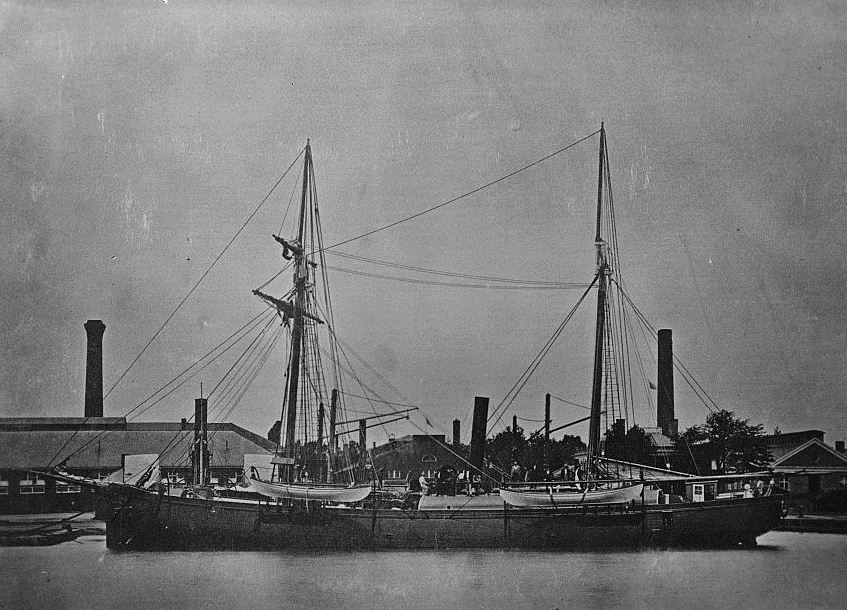
USS Polaris in 1871

During his term as Secretary Robeson authorized a number of exploratory missions. Prominent among these was the Polaris Expedition, the United States' first serious attempt at arctic exploration, an attempt to be the first nation to reach the North Pole. Despite Congress' general reluctance to spend money, Robeson was able to obtain $50,000 in funding for the expedition. On June 29, 1871, at 7 pm, USS Polaris, sailed from the New York Naval Yard, with Charles Francis Hall, a veteran of two previous arctic expeditions, in command.

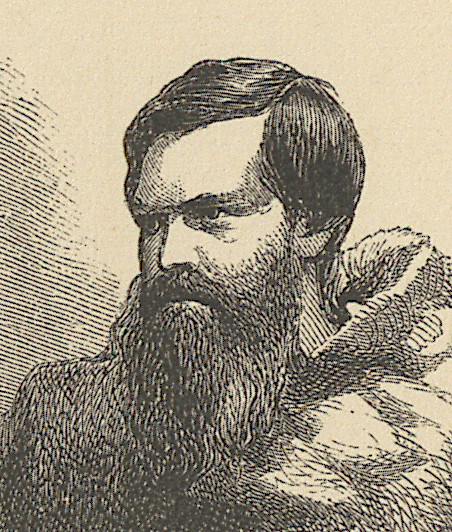
Charles Francis Hall

The expedition soon fell into disarray. On October 24 Hall fell sick after drinking a cup of coffee, and died two weeks later. After a perfunctory attempt to reach the pole by dog sled, in June 1872 the crew abandoned the mission and turned south. They were stopped by pack ice, and ended up split into two parties; one group rode an ice floe southward, while the other had to overwinter aboard ship, but both parties were ultimately rescued.

Upon the crew's return, Robeson, on June 5, 1873, opened an investigation into what had happened. While circumstantial evidence suggested that Hall had been murdered, lacking a body and most of the expedition's journals, the entire crew was cleared of wrongdoing. However, In 1968, Hall's body was recovered, and modern scientific testing revealed he had been poisoned with arsenic.

Hall, before his death, named Robeson Channel in honor of Secretary Robeson.

==== Survey for a Nicaraguan Canal ====
Another mission undertaken during Robeson's term was an 1872-73 expedition to Nicaragua to investigate possible routes for a canal linking the Atlantic and Pacific oceans. The expedition, led by Commander Alexander F. Crosman, USN, departed the United States for Nicaragua on March 10, 1872, and arriving at Greytown, Nicaragua on April 7. Five days later the expedition suffered a major setback when Crosman drowned in a boat accident; he was temporarily replaced by Commander Chester Hatfield, commander of USS Kansas, the screw steamer that had delivered the crew to Nicaragua, and later, after a brief withdrawal for regrouping, by Commander Edward P. Lull. Over the next year three principal route options were surveyed and evaluated by civil engineers and a Navy hydrographer, while biological and geological studies were produced and samples gathered. Hatfield, back in command of the Kansas, made detailed climate observations over a six-month period. A historical essay on previous efforts to initiate canal development (most of which never got beyond the drawing board) was produced by historian J. P. Nourse of the U. S. Naval Observatory. Late in the expedition, in April 1873, a partially successful attempt was made to blast away several obstructions in the Rio San Juan, using kegs of gunpowder and several "torpedoes" (in this case, still meaning mines, being used here as simple explosive charges) acquired from the recently established Torpedo Station at Newport. The expedition had returned to the United States and submitted a preliminary report by December 1, 1874.

The routes believed most promising were not sea-level routes. These surveys did not lead to any serious attempt at building a canal.

=== Submarine and torpedo testing (1869–1875) ===
==== Submarines ====
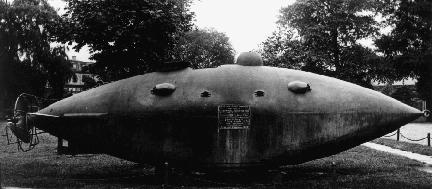
Intelligent Whale, currently on display at the Washington Navy Yard

During Robeson's tenure as Navy secretary, the development of submarine and torpedo technologies was encouraged by the U.S. Navy. Though not the first submarine to be offered to the Navy, a hand-crank-powered submarine called Intelligent Whale was evaluated during Robeson's term. Built in 1863, partly with government funds (available because one of the promoters, Oliver Halstead, had connections within the Lincoln administration), the vessel was privately tested in 1866, with a man successfully exiting the craft while submerged, attaching an explosive charge to a scow, re-entering the craft, and detonating the charge, destroying the scow. Difficulty finding a crew to man the vessel, and a protracted dispute over ownership (which ended with Halstead in possession of the craft), delayed further testing. Finally, in October 1869, the vessel's existence was brought to the attention of Secretary Robeson; and after a committee appointed by Robeson gave a favorable opinion on the boat's merits, on October 29 Robeson signed an agreement with Halstead to purchase the submarine for $50,000--$12,500 up front, another $12,500 upon successful completion of testing, and the final $25,000 when all "secrets and inventions" connected with the craft were signed over. Actual testing did not take place until 1872; this was judged to be unsuccessful, as the vessel leaked profusely, and the initial payment was the only money the Navy would end up spending on the vessel.

Of more importance in the long term, John Holland, who would, in the 1890s, produce the first operational submarines for both Britain and the United States, submitted his first (unsuccessful) design to the U. S. Navy during Robeson's tenure.

==== Torpedoes ====
In mid-1869 either Robeson or his predecessor Borie (sources differ) ordered the establishment of a research facility, the United States Naval Torpedo Station, on Goat Island, in the harbor of Newport, Rhode Island. This facility was dedicated to the development of torpedoes and torpedo equipment, explosives, and electrical equipment. Through the 1870s its efforts focused on the refinement of fixed and towed mines and spar torpedoes. With regard to self-propelled torpedoes, while engineers at the facility did study the design of the Whitehead torpedo (developed by English expatriate Robert Whitehead at his workshop at Fiume, in the Austro-Hungarian Empire, and marketed to world navies from 1866), they rejected it and embarked on developing a very similar machine, with a design incorporating essentially all that they knew about the Whitehead, with gaps in the available information being filled in by the station's staff.

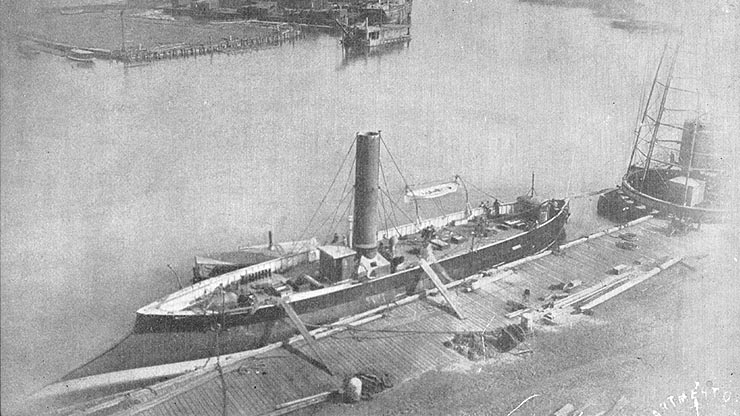
USS Alarm was the United States' first purpose-built ramming spar torpedo warship, commissioned in 1873, during Robeson's term in office

Robeson issed a vague specification calling for this torpedo, which became known (along with other contemporary, fully submerged, self-propelled torpedoes) as "the Fish," to be able to go underwater for a considerable distance, at a fair speed, maintaining a straight course, while remaining submerged. The Fish produced by the Newport facility was 12 1/2 feet (3.8 m) long, weighed 480 pounds (220 kg), carried 70–90 pounds (32–41 kg) of guncotton as its warhead, and had a range of 300–400 yards (270–370 m). Compressed air drove a 1-foot (0.30 m) diameter, four-bladed propeller. Initial testing showed that the torpedo worked, although there were problems with leakage and azimuth control. The depth mechanism worked well. Development of the Fish appears to have ended when the man in charge of the project, Lt. Cdr. Matthews, was transferred out of Newport in 1874.

Several other types of self-propelled torpedo were evaluated at Newport during Robeson's tenure. In the summer of 1872, inventor-entrepreneur John L. Lay, who had patented numerous inventions related to torpedoes since 1865, conducted a test of a remote-controlled, self-propelled torpedo powered by superheated carbonic acid gas at the Newport facility. Although the test ostensibly went well, the torpedo itself proved so complex and expensive ($15,000 per unit in 1872 dollars) that it was not, in the end, adopted by the U. S. Navy. The Peruvian Navy did, however, adopt the type, and used it in combat at the Second Battle of Antofagasta in 1879, while the Russian government undertook licensed manufacture on a very small scale at an unspecified date. Also tested during this period were the rocket-powered Barber Torpedo, of 1873, and the Ericsson Torpedo, powered by compressed air supplied to the machine through a hose from shore. However, of all the self-propelled torpedoes assessed at the Newport facility during this period, only one, the flywheel-powered Howell torpedo (developed between 1870 and 1889), actually entered service, serving from 1889 to 1898, being phased out after a much-improved version of the Whitehead torpedo was adopted in 1894.

==== Torpedo Delivery Systems ====
In connection with the torpedo research, during Robeson's tenure the Navy commissioned two experimental seagoing torpedo vessels, USS Alarm (1873) and USS Intrepid (1874). Neither appears to have been closely associated with the development of self-propelled torpedoes; neither was assigned to the Newport facility for more than a few months (in 1877-78 and late 1874, respectively) during their careers (both working entirely with spar torpedoes during those periods), and while Alarm spent much of her career doing experimental work for the Bureau of Ordnance in Washington, Intrepid, after only a few months active, spent most of her remaining life laid up in New York. While some sources say that Intrepid was intended to carry self-propelled torpedoes operationally, others state that, during her relatively brief 1874 association with the Torpedo Station, and later during two months of testing at various locations along the east coast, Intrepid exercised only with spar torpedoes. Given that the Navy did not have an operational self-propelled torpedo until 1889, the idea that this vessel did much, if any, work with self-propelled torpedoes in the 1870s seems unlikely.

Of more significance was a small (58-foot-long), much faster (19 knot maximum; 16-16.5 knot sustained) vessel called Steam Launch #6 or, informally, Lightning. This vessel participated in some experiments with deploying spar torpedoes on a fast vessel, but the lasting significance of this boat was that, in purchasing it in 1876, the Navy established a lasting relationship with a local Rhode Island boat builder, the Herreschoff Manufacturing Company, a firm which would, in succeeding decades, play a major role in the development of torpedo boats and destroyers to deliver the new weapons.

By 1875 all U.S. naval cruisers were outfitted with spar and towed torpedoes, and naval officers were trained in their deployment.

=== Virginius incident and war crisis (1873) ===
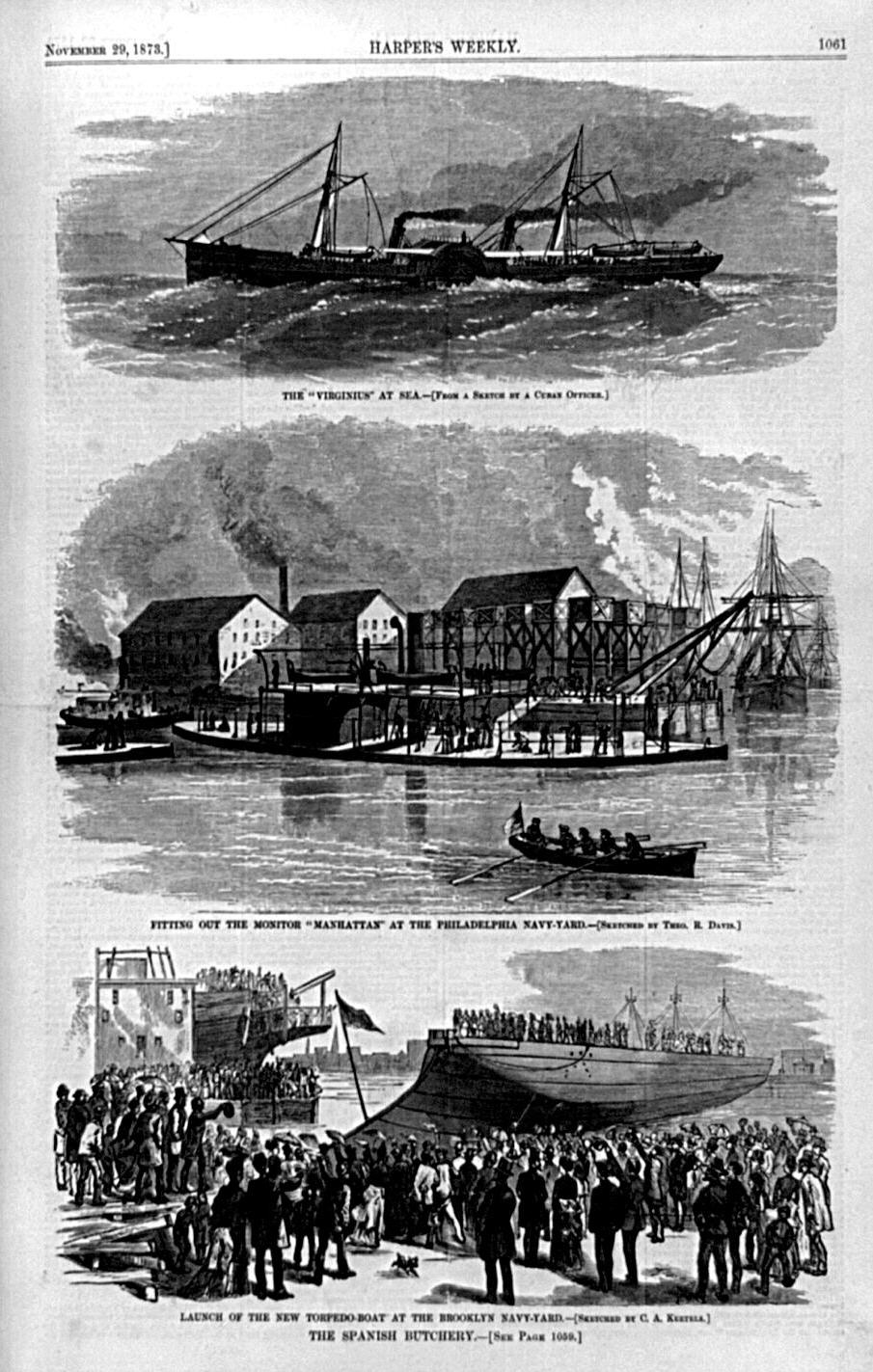
The Spanish Butchery: illustrations of the U.S. naval response over the Virginius incident (Harper's Weekly, 1873)

Starting in 1870 the former Confederate blockade runner SS Virgin, renamed SS Virginius, operating under whatever national flag best served its operators' interests at any given moment, made several trips to Cuba, delivering weapons to revolutionaries fighting the Ten Years' War, the first of three late-19th-century uprisings against Spanish rule over the island. On October 31, 1873, the Spanish warship Tornado finally ran down and captured Virginius during another such smuggling expedition. The ship was taken to Santiago, Cuba, and initially caused only a minor diplomatic stir. However, over the next few days news began to reach the outside world that some of the crewmen and passengers from the ship, including numerous British and American citizens, had been taken ashore, hastily tried, and executed by firing squad. Both the U.S. and Britain sent naval vessels to Cuba to halt the executions, but before they arrived two additional groups of men from the vessel were executing, bringing the total number killed to 53, out of 155 people on board. This caused outrage among many Americans, and with war a real possibility, on November 14, 1873, President Grant ordered the Navy to be put on a war footing. Accordingly, Secretary Robeson ordered a number of U.S. warships, elements of the North Atlantic Squadron, to proceed to Key West, Florida, 90 miles from Cuba, and prepare for action. Because the ships involved were operating independently, and were widely dispersed, the force did not finish assembling until late January 1874, by which time the crisis had largely passed, as the questionably legal nature of Virginius' activities became more fully understood. Changes within the Spanish government (including the restoration of the monarchy, ending an experiment in democratic rule that had lasted little more than a year) drew out the final negotiations, regarding (mainly) indemnities for the families of the executed crew members and passengers, until early 1875.

=== Identifying and Addressing Weaknesses in the Navy ===
With the wind-down of the Virginius crisis, in January 1874 it was decided that, with a large group of front-line ships assembled (at Key West) for the first time in years, it would be an appropriate time for the U.S. Navy to stage a series of maneuvers, to test new and unproven tactical doctrines adopted since the end of the Civil War. The maneuvers, conducted in February and March, became a fiasco: the assembled force, made up of four monitors and 12 unarmored screw sloops (with other vessels filling in at times), had a great deal of difficulty keeping formation, and when in formation could move at a speed of only four and a half knots.

If this was not proof enough of the U.S. Navy"s lack of readiness, while the Virginius Affair was unfolding many Americans took notice of a state-of-the-art Spanish broadside ironclad, the Arapiles, which was undergoing repairs at a New York shipyard. Spanish governments of the 1860s and 1870s had, after a long lull, begun to provide funding for a significant modernization program for the Spanish Navy, which included funding for the construction or purchase of seven seagoing ironclads. In contrast, the United States, during its Civil War-era build-up, had spent a great deal of money building large numbers of less elaborate, less expensive types for blockade and coastal work; and when the war was over, Congress had decided that, rather than spending money on new ships, they would wait until the existing ones wore out to purchase new vessels, no matter how far this left the Navy behind technologically in the interim. So long as this state of affairs existed the U.S. Navy would be no match for the navy of Spain, much less those of any of the major powers. One U.S. officer opined that two of the modern Spanish warships could have decimated the entire American flotilla at Key West, the best ships the U.S. Navy could offer at the time.

Further emphasizing this backwardness, a Navy Department exhibit at the 1876 Centennial Exposition was noted mainly for the obsolescence of the technology that was exhibited, in contrast to what the War Department and foreign naval powers put on display.

From the time he came into office George Robeson had been aware of the material shortcomings of the U.S. Fleet, and had tried to obtain funding for new construction. Congress refused to provide such funding, and even after the events surrounding the Virginius Affair shed light on just how badly the service needed competitive ships, funding for new ships was still denied, although some funding for the repair of existing vessels was allocated. Robeson's staff had (ostensibly) already inspected and evaluated these vessels, and determined that most had decayed beyond the point of economical repair. Apparently believing that desperate measures had to be taken, in July 1874 Robeson decided to commit a bold and illegal act: under the guise of rebuilding several ships, Robeson instead delivered five armored ships—four twin-turreted monitors of the Miantonomoh class and the never-completed single-turret monitor USS Puritan—that department surveyors had judged rotted beyond repair to carefully selected shipbuilders, who then laid down five new, broadly similar ships, which were given the same names as the old vessels. These were then represented to Congress and the public as actually being the original vessels, thoroughly overhauled. This was the second time Robeson had arranged for new ships to be built without authorization from Congress: in 1871-72 the Secretary had ordered the construction of six new unarmored vessels, again concealing the fact by turning older vessels with the same names over to the yards that were building the new vessels, and representing the new ones as "rebuilds." In both cases the yards were allowed to scrap the original vessels, along with (over time) dozens of additional vessels deemed unrepairable that had quietly been turned over to them, with the proceeds the yards obtained from the sale of recovered materials supplementing the money paid to the yards for building the new ships.

In spite of this creative accounting, all the funds obtained through various means were still not sufficient to cover the cost of completing the vessels, and this lack of funds, unfortunately for the scheme, delayed construction until past the end of Robeson's term. The scheme was exposed when Robeson's successor, Richard W. Thompson, took office in 1877. In spite of the amount of money that had already been spent, construction of most of the ships involved was halted. A few of the sloops were completed and commissioned promptly, while others were not completed until as late as 1883. As for the monitors, most were left on the slipways, untouched, for nearly 20 years before payment for their completion was finally authorized. These vessels were ultimately commissioned in time to serve in the Spanish-American War, by which time the new ships had themselves become thoroughly obsolete.

Not long after construction of the unauthorized vessels was undertaken, Congress did authorize the construction of eight additional screw sloops, three iron-hulled (the Alert class) and five wooden-hulled (the Enterprise class), which were completed promptly, but were not highly regarded. Robeson's many critics suggested that these vessels were ordered more as a way of obtaining more funds to divert to other projects than for any expected value as warships.

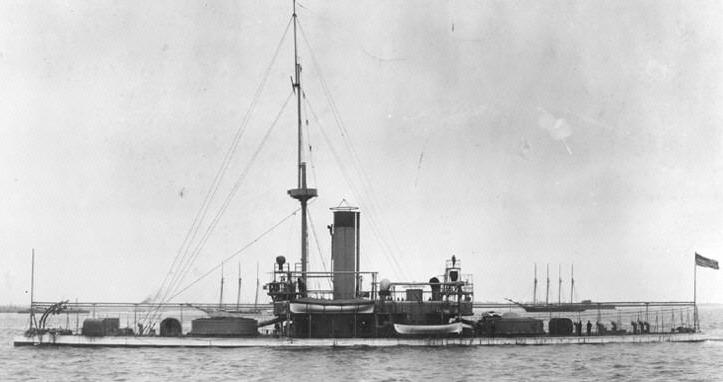
USS Miantonomoh Ordered by Secretary Robeson in 1874 to modernize and strengthen the U.S. Navy. Launched December 5, 1876

=== Report on U.S. Navy (1875) ===
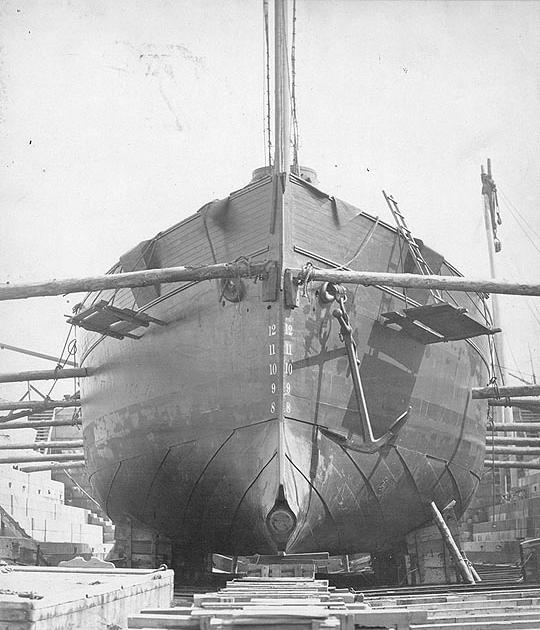
USS Intrepid, the United States' first propelled-torpedo warship, was ordered by Secretary Robeson and commissioned in 1874.

On December 6, 1875, Secretary Robeson released his annual report on the condition of the U.S. Navy. He stated that by 1875 the U.S. Navy was as strong as it had been at any time during Grant's presidency. It included 147 ships of every class and description, including twenty-six sailing vessels without even auxiliary power. Of the 147 ships, 80 were available for war, including sixteen ironclads and two experimental spar-torpedo ships, USS Alarm and USS Intrepid. There was a total of 1,195 guns on all the ships, including Gatling guns (said to be mounted on every ship in the Navy) and experimental breech-loading howitzers; and the Torpedo School at Newport was developing efficient torpedoes (of unspecified types) that could cause great destruction. Concerning the five double-turreted monitors that Robeson had ordered "rebuilt" in June 1874 (the fact that they were actually new ships was still a secret), the Secretary pressed Congress for funding to complete the ships.

Critics, notably Porter, strongly disagreed with much of what Robeson said in his report, pointing out that in 1869 the number of ships in the fleet had been stated as 203, far greater than the 147 total he cited for 1875; how this could be reconciled with Robeson's statement that the Navy was as strong as it had been at any other time during Grant's term was left unclear. As far as ship tonnage was concerned, they accused him of misrepresenting the size of the U.S. fleet by stating the tonnages of American ships and foreign ships in different types of tons. Criticism of attempts to mislead in Robeson's report would play a major role in triggering the Congressional investigation of the following year.

=== House Investigations and Corruption Allegations (1872-1876) ===
==== 1872 Investigation ====
Robeson's management of the Department of the Navy was investigated on multiple occasions. On May 22, 1872, a Select Committee to Investigate Alleged Abuses in the Navy Department, created in response to news reports of impropriety in the department, held a hearing. During this hearing Robeson was accused of having amassed a fortune worth more than $500,000 in the two-and-a-half years since his appointment. Robeson and his political ally, former Senator Alexander Cattell, were both said to have profited immensely (to the tune of more than $1.2 million) from no-bid contracts for the sale of coal, iron plate, timber, and brick to the Navy. Robeson was also accused of drawing $93,000 out of department funds on January 1, 1870, when most of the department's clerical staff had the day off, without proper accounting; he stated that this was to make a long-overdue payment to a shipbuilder who, years earlier, had not been paid for incorporating late-requested modifications into three monitors his firm had built. In the end Robeson's principal accuser, Charles A. Dana, editor of the New York Sun, who had (strangely) been allowed to run the proceedings, failed to produce any witnesses or other proof to back his accusations, and the matter was dropped.

==== 1876 Investigation: Accusations Against the Department ====
The Navy, and Robeson's administration of it, was investigated a second time in July 1876 by the House Committee on Naval Affairs, chaired by Representative Washington C. Whitthorne. This time a very wide array of charges were made, not all aimed directly at Robeson, but virtually all painting his oversight in a bad light. Major charges made against the Navy Department as an institution included:

--letting contracts without any competitive bidding process being required; and when competitive bidding was required, raising prices paid by the Navy by covertly raising the amounts of winning bids after the winners had been announced, simply by erasing the original figure and entering a higher one. The actual winners still won, but were only paid on the basis of their actual bids, leaving the difference to be divided up among department personnel and facilitators;

--failing to get authorization to sell naval property (notably stockpiles of ships' machinery that had been built, but never installed in any ship), and failing to deliver the proceeds from the sale of such commodities to the Treasury, as required by law;

--transferring money appropriated for one specific purpose to another without authorization;

--spending more money than had been allocated during a given year, covering up such occurrences by deferring payment requests into the following year;

--hiring unqualified laborers at Navy Yards just before elections, and paying them to do little or nothing, as a way of bribing them to vote for particular candidates; or to take involuntary political contributions out of those wages;

--failing to enforce the terms of contracts against suppliers who failed to live up to them by levying fines or other punishments against them, in accordance with statutes;

--failing to take proper measures to guard property in their care, notably during the hasty 1874 relocation of the Philadelphia Navy Yard, including all equipment, to a new location; theft was said to have been rampant;

--allowing personnel with conflicts of interest to inspect and assess the value of property being considered for purchase or sale; this often involved condemning Navy-owned property, leading to its being sold at a discount to a collaborator, and then re-evaluating it and approving it for sale back to the Navy at full price;

--allowing people to take multiple jobs, drawing full pay for all of them; in some cases these people were being paid to patrol stands of timber reserved for the Navy, to guard against wildcat harvesting, while holding full-time positions at Navy yards hundreds of miles away;

--and, most notoriously, participating in a scheme under which entirely new ships were built with monies appropriated for repairing existing vessels; the fact that this had been done with some wooden ships laid down in 1872 had come out before the hearing, but the fact that the same thing was being done with five ironclads that had been laid down two years later was still secret at the time.

An additional accusation concerned the spending of $400,000 on the repair of 15 or 16 ironclads; it is not made clear in the majority report what this refers to, but it may be an off-the-mark accusation drawing in both the repair monies diverted toward the construction of new ironclads, and the turning over of old ironclads to the builders of the new ones as additional payment, before the scheme that involved both became known.

==== 1876 Investigation: Accusations Against Robeson ====
Among the accusations made against Robeson personally were that, after awarding A. G. Cattell & Company—a company founded by his political patron, but now apparently run by his brother, E. G. Cattell—a no-bid, $30,000 contract for the purchase of grain, Mr. Cattell had kicked some of the total back to Robeson, and then used the influence thus purchased to secure similar contracts for others, taking "brokerage fees" for doing so. Within an incomprehensible mass of transactions documented in Cattell's books are some payments to Robeson from what was labelled a "gratuity account." The accusers believed that ill-gotten gains had been laundered through real estate transactions, many related to a vacation house, allegedly worth $320,000, at Long Branch, on the New Jersey shore, in which Cattell and Robeson apparently held joint ownership of a 5% share.

Robeson's association with banking issues also came up during the 1876 hearings. Prior to May, 1871 the U. S. Department of the Treasury had, since 1805 (with short interruptions), contracted with a respected London banking house, Baring Brothers & Company, to manage foreign accounts on behalf of the U. S. government, including the Navy. But in May 1871, apparently at Robeson's instigation, the government pulled out of this agreement, and instead contracted with the firm of Cooke, McCullough & Company, a far less well-established firm than Baring Brothers, to handle their overseas banking needs. The principal of the new firm, Jay Cooke, was a prominent American banker who had made a fortune selling war bonds during the Civil War, and had only recently opened up a subsidiary in Britain. Robeson's critics suggest that his cultivation of a relationship with Cooke had little to do with the latter's skill and reputation as a banker, and more to do with his substantial holdings in the United States, which made Cooke and his associates "very powerful friends, where actively interested in the success of the administration, and dangerous enemies . . . when indifferent or unfriendly." Robeson stated that Cooke's firm was chosen largely because it was wholly American-run, but the company was not on a firm financial footing: its initial capitalization had come entirely in the form of personal deposits made by the principals, and once Navy contracts started to move significant amounts of money through the bank, Cooke and his partners quietly withdrew their own money. By 1873 Cooke's influence was on the wane: his American bank, Jay Cooke and Company, went bankrupt in September 1873, helping to precipitate the Panic of 1873. To help shore up what was left of Cooke's remaining finances, Robeson helped get his political backer, former Senator Cattell, appointed as the Treasury's representative in London, placing him in a position to stabilize, but also "control and manipulate," the remaining holdings of Cooke, McCullough & Company.

This did not last for long. When Benjamin Bristow was appointed Secretary of Treasury by Grant in June 1874, he decided that he did not want Cattell to continue as the Treasury's representative abroad and, over Robeson's objection, lobbied Grant to appoint John Bigelow, head of the Treasury Department's Loan Division, instead. Grant accepted Bristow's choice; Bristow then garnered further hostility from Robeson by telling Grant that the Navy Department was financially mismanaged, bringing to his attention Robeson's connection with Cooke and McCullough. Bristow's advisers, apparently believing that this accusation was pushing things too far, warned Bristow to cool things off and take a less confrontational approach.

Lastly, the House committee noted that, between 1872 and 1876, Congress had allocated $56 million to the Navy Department for ship repairs, and now, at the end of that span, some $15 million could not be accounted for. Over the same span Robeson had deposited more than $300,000 into various bank accounts, while claiming that his only source of income was his government salary, which amounted to only $8000 per year. Many on the committee, for obvious reasons, believed there was a connection between Robeson's windfall and the shortfall in the repair budget, but, while his explanation was considered questionable, no witness would testify that the documentary evidence against him was accurate, so no charge was filed against him for this.

==== 1876 Investigation: Recommendations of the Majority ====
Among the majority's recommendations to prevent recurrence of what they considered to be crimes were that a bill be passed requiring that detailed estimates of the cost of any proposed undertaking be provided to Congress before work began, and then be strictly adhered to; a bill eliminating the position of Civil Engineer from the Navy's structure; and the creation of a Board of Naval Commissioners, a board of naval officers that would take control over administrative matters, such as the letting of contracts, from the Secretary of the Navy.

The majority confidently stated that, with these reforms in place, the maintenance of the Navy, as intended by Congress, could be readily achieved for a sum of $12 million per annum, roughly two-thirds of what was being expended under Robeson's administration, if only strict compliance with all laws and regulations could be enforced. As for expansion of the Navy, they opined that all that was needed could be achieved through the expenditure of $3 million more per annum. The majority concluded by recommending that the minutes of the hearing be passed on to the House Committee of the Judiciary, and that if that committee should find that, through whatever loopholes or alternative interpretations, Robeson and other individuals singled out as offenders had not committed any crimes, that they revise the laws to make certain that such offences were, in the future, defined as criminal.

==== 1876 Investigation: Republican Rebuttal ====
In rebuttal, the Republican minority argued that, in the context of the 1870s, strict adherence to statutes would make it impossible to maintain a Navy capable of providing useful service:

"It will not do for the majority, in one breath, to complain of the Secretary of the Navy for not having a larger or more formidable navy, and in the next to deny to him the right to rebuild or remodel even those which he has, without special authority from Congress; to condemn him for not having rifled cannon of the largest caliber, and at the same time deny his power to make experiments even in that direction; to complain that the iron-clads of the country are in an unfinished and worthless condition, and at the same time to declare that he violates the law when he rebuilds and makes them efficient. And yet such is the position taken by the majority of this committee, who have even gone so far in their report as to deny that the Secretary has power to break up a ship of the Navy and use the material taken therefrom to repair and reconstruct other ships of war!"

President Grant, five months after the hearing, would use the same language in defense of Robeson during his final State of the Union Address.

The Republican minority pointed out that some of the department's accusers had themselves violated the very laws that Robeson and his underlings in the department had been accused of violating. One conspicuous example of this was Porter's expenditure, entirely on his own initiative, of $29,500 in Navy funds to refurbish the pre-war yacht America so that it could participate in a race under his Admiral's flag. The Republican members suggested that actions like this, which had motivated Robeson, soon after coming into office, to take steps to curb the Admiral's activities, offered a view of what might happen if the Navy, per the Democratic majority's recommendation, actually created a Board of Commissioners to supersede, or at least directly supervise, the Navy's bureaus, to ensure compliance with regulations. Such a board, made up largely of senior line officers, had existed from 1815 to 1843, but had been abolished because it was realized, even in the 1840s, that such officers lacked an understanding of specialized fields that were becoming critically important, such as steam engineering and extended-range gunnery, as well as a more basic understanding of how quickly new technology was rendering even Civil War-era technology obsolete. The need for technical personnel in senior roles was what brought in the Bureau system in 1843. An example of just how out of date the line officers had become can be found in a prominent argument in the Democratic majority's report: in a lengthy statement the majority argued vigorously against the adoption, for use in Navy vessels, of compound engines, which allowed steam produced by the boilers to be used more than once to power, sequentially, first a high-pressure cylinder and then one or more lower-powered ones, thereby augmenting the power extracted from that steam, and economizing on the use of fuel to heat it. The line officers failed to understand that the difference was not merely in the use of hotter, higher-pressure steam—which, they argued, could simply be applied to engines of the simpler, traditional type, with comparable results. Engineer officers, at home and abroad, knew better, and double- and, later, triple-expansion engines, by c. 1890, would completely supplant single-expansion engines in naval vessels.worldwide.

=== U.S. Senate run (1876) ===
In 1876, Robeson was nominated by the Republican Party to run for the New Jersey U.S. Senate seat. However, corruption charges against Robeson caused him to lose the election.

== Legal career in Camden County ==
Robeson left office a few days after President Grant's departure from office, in March 1877. Having failed in the U.S. Senate bid, Robeson returned to his law practice in Camden County. One of the more prominent cases he dealt with as a private-sector attorney involved his serving on the defense team for Benjamin F. Hunter, who had loaned a music publisher, John M. Armstrong, $12,000, then taken out an insurance policy on Armstrong for $26,000, hired a hit man to murder Armstrong for the insurance money, and set up another man for the crime. Though the man who was set up, Ford W. Davis, was held for a time, ultimately Hunter was indicted for murder and, on June 10, 1878, was put on trial. After a 23-day trial Hunter was convicted, and after his appeal was rejected, he was executed on July 10, 1879.

== U.S. Representative (1879–1883) ==
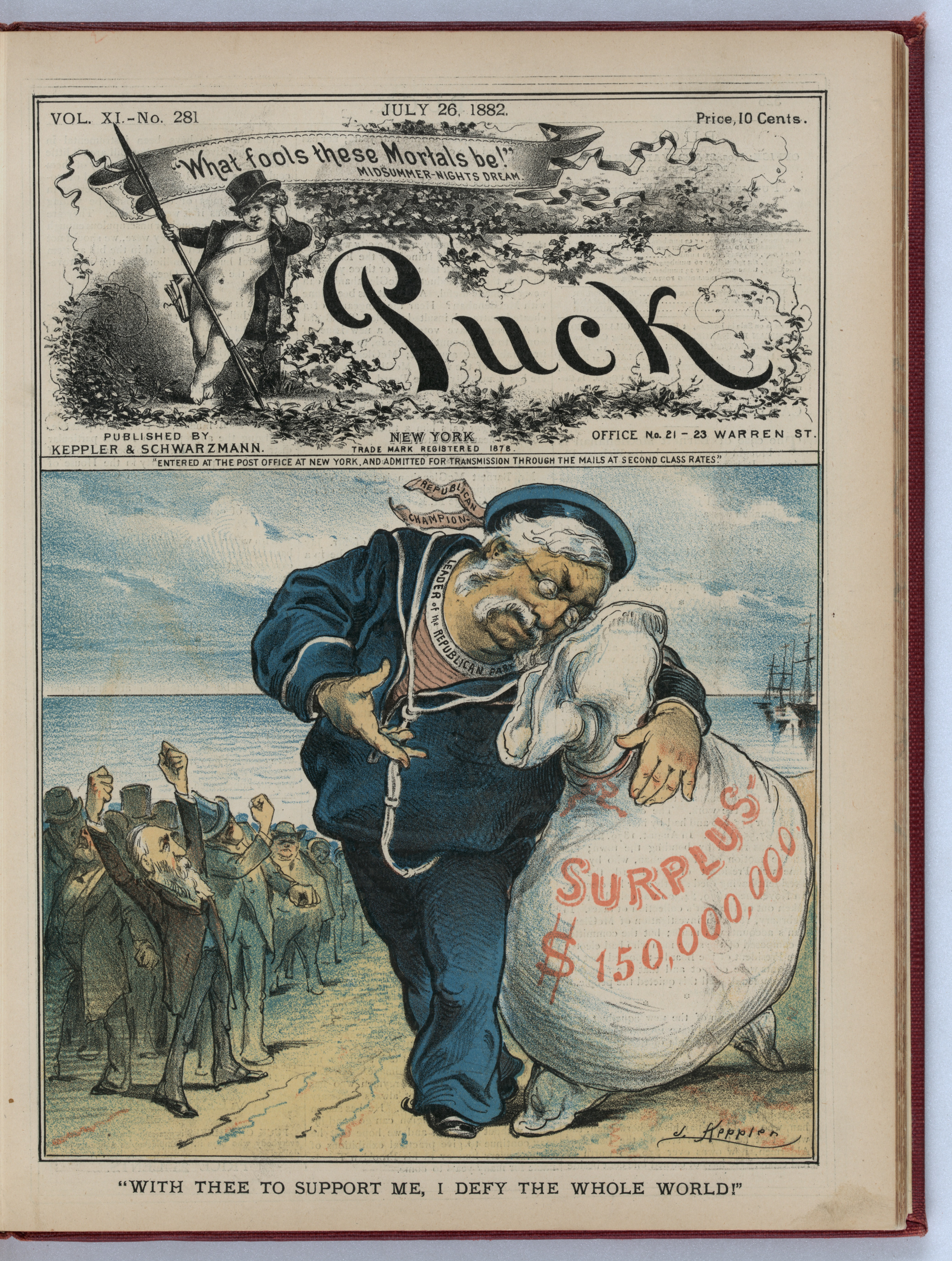
Robeson lampooned by Puck magazine for $150,000,000 surplus. Robeson was Chairman of Naval expenditures. (Keppler 1882)

In 1878, Robeson ran for and was elected to the U.S. Congress, representing New Jersey's 1st Congressional District through two terms, from March 4, 1879, through March 3, 1883. During his second term he served as chairman of both the House Republican Conference and the Committee on Expenditures in the Department of the Navy. Serving in these roles he was criticized in the Democratic-leaning Puck magazine for his role in getting a large surplus allocated to the Navy; however, this allocation would prove to be of great significance to the Navy, as it helped to pay for the service's first steel-hulled ships, known as the ABCD Ships. This event is characterized by historians as marking the birth of the "New Navy." Robeson was defeated in a bid for a third term by Democrat Thomas M. Ferrell; the defeat was reputedly engineered by a fellow Republican, William J. Sewell, who won a Senate seat in the same election.

In 1880, Robeson, while he still serving in the House of Representatives, made another run for the U.S. Senate, but was again defeated.

== Private Life and Death ==
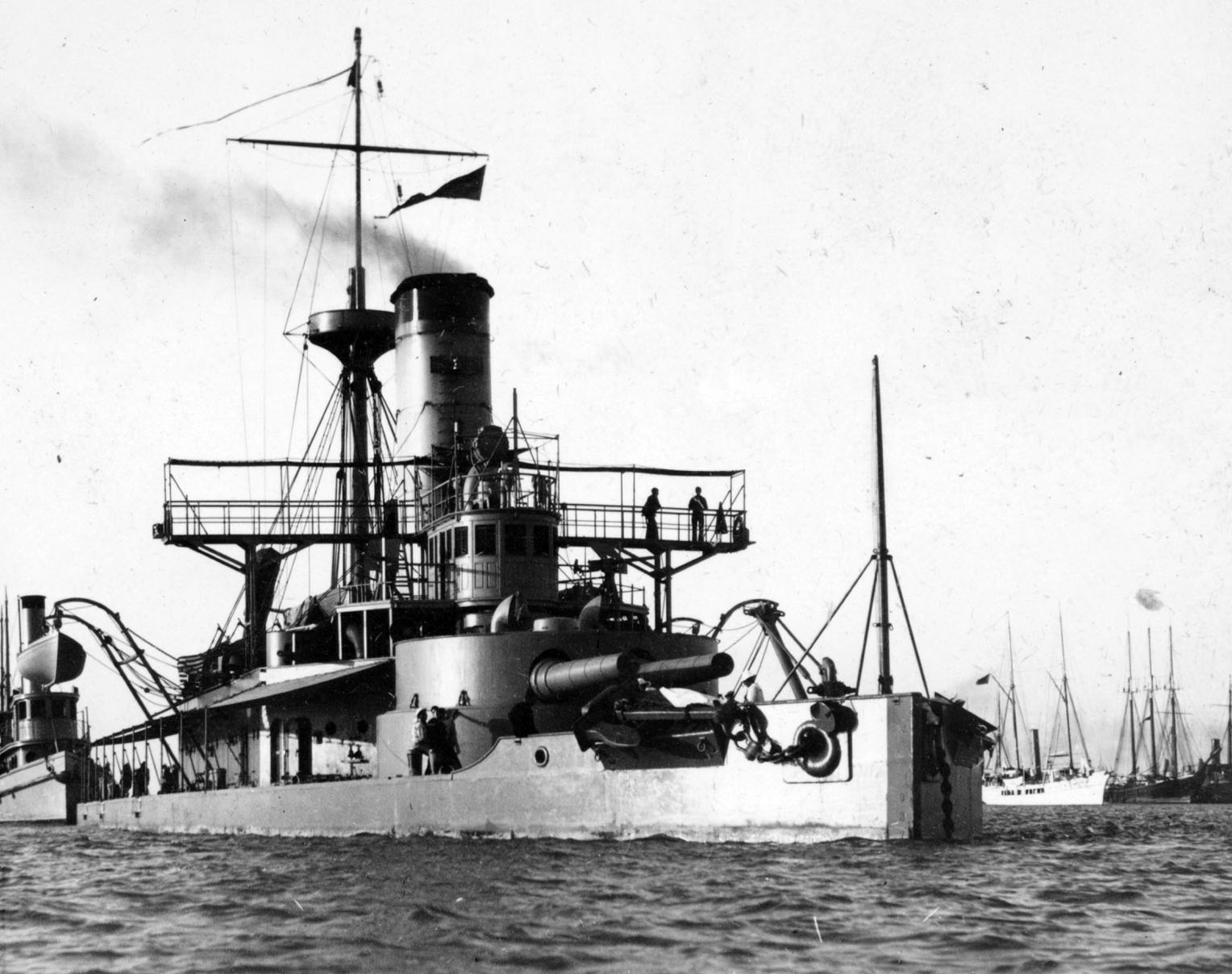
USS Puritan, two guns turreted, laid down in 1874 by Sec. Robeson, actively served during the Spanish–American War, bombarding Matanzas, Cuba on April 27, 1898.

On January 23, 1872, Robeson married Mary Isabella (Ogston) Aulick, a widow with a son, Richmond Aulick. Robeson and Mary had a daughter named Ethel Maxwell Robeson. After Robeson was defeated in a bitter 1882 Congressional race which left him $60,000 in debt, forcing him to sell his Washington D.C. property, including his luxurious mansion, his wife took their daughter to Britain and did not come back. Ethel would marry William Sterling, the son of British Maj. John Barton Sterling, on November 22, 1910, in Christ Church, Mayfair, England. Mary's son, Richmond, remained in the United States, and graduated from the College of New Jersey in 1889.

In New Jersey people began to refer to the now-destitute Robeson derisively as "Poor Roby." However, a friend, James L. Hayes, came to Robeson's aid, helping him to acquire a small house near the State House in Trenton in which he could live and practice law. During this period he served as attorney for the Baltimore and Ohio Railroad.

By 1891 Robeson appeared to be mounting something of a comeback: he took up residence in a much more opulent house, and expressed an interest in running a house seat for the fourth time. However, the Trenton district in which he now lived was content with a Democratic ticket backed by a great deal of power and influence, and nothing became of Robeson's inquiry into public office.

In 1885 Robeson was sued for $278 by a liveryman named James Cambel, and later settled for $50. Robeson continued practicing law until his death at the age of 68 on September 27, 1897. He is buried at Belvidere Cemetery in Belvidere, New Jersey.

== Historical reputation ==
Historians have generally been short on praise for Robeson, although, because the various accusations made against him never led to any action being taken against him, they have rarely been as severe as one might expect. Expectations of him upon his appointment as Secretary of the Navy were apparently low, with contemporaries describing him as a "first-rate judge of wine, a second-rate trout fisherman, and a third-rate New Jersey lawyer;" it was generally believed that the punch line for this sentence was that he would make a fourth-rate Secretary of the Navy. A more recent commentator has described him as a successful businessman whose company Grant enjoyed, who was content to leave naval matters in the hands of the admirals. An early 20th-century historian described him as an impatient and high-strung administrator, while a more recent one more has described him as "a capable if often slipshod administrator, shadowed by suspicions of corruption." Less charitably, a history student from MIT described Robeson as "one of the more corrupt politicians of the period . . . quite a strong claim to make, considering that during Grant's administration scandals involved a Secretary of the Treasury, a Secretary of War, Grant's personal secretary, and the Vice-President of the United States, but it is borne out by the revelations of the Congressional committee which investigated the Navy in 1876, after seven years of Robeson's stewardship"

Historically, Robeson is often mentioned by biographers of Ulysses S. Grant.

== Sources ==
=== Books ===
By Author

- Calhoun, Charles W. (2017). The Presidency of Ulysses S. Grant. Lawrence: University Press of Kansas. ISBN 978-0-7006-2484-3. scholarly review and response by Calhoun at doi:10.14296/RiH/2014/2270
- Chernow, Ron (2017). Grant. New York: Penguin Press. ISBN 978-1-59420-487-6.
- Davis, C.H., ed. (1876). Narrative of the North Polar Expedition: U.S. Ship Polaris, Captain Charles Francis Hall Commanding. Washington: U.S. Naval Observatory.
- Friedman, Norman (1985). U.S. Battleships: An Illustrated Design History. Annapolis, Maryland: United States Naval Institute. ISBN 0-87021-715-1.
- Jolie, E.W. (1978), A Brief History of U. S. Navy Torpedo Development. Naval Underwater Systems Center Technical Document 5436. Available at https://www.maritime.org/doc/jolie/index.php. Accessed December 29, 2025. Naval Underwater Systems Center, Newport, RI.
- McFeely, William S. (1974). Woodward, C. Vann (ed.). Responses of the Presidents to Charges of Misconduct. New York, New York: Delacorte Press. pp. 133–162. ISBN 0-440-05923-2.
- Mowat,
- O'Toole, G.J.A. (1984). The Spanish War: An American Epic--1898. New York, New York: W.W. Norton & Company, Inc. ISBN 0-393-30304-7.
- Parry, Richard (2002), Trial by Ice: The True Story of Murder and Survival on the 1871 Polaris Expedition. Ballantine Books.
- Rentfrow, James C. (2014). Home Squadron: The U.S. Navy on the North Atlantic Station. Annapolis, Maryland: Naval Institute Press.
- Roberts, William Howard. The American Navy, 1865-1882. Unpublished research paper created in partial fulfillment of requirements for a Bachelor of Science degree from the Massachusetts Institute of Technology, February 1973, pp. 23–44. Document No. 2486674O-MIT.pdf. Available at https://www.dspace.mit.edu/bitstream/handle/1721.1/8571O/24866740-MIT.pdf.. Accessed December 25, 2025.
- George M. Robeson, Alexander F. Crosman, Chester Hatfield, and Edward Phelps Lull, Reports on Explorations and Surveys for the Location of a Ship-Canal between the Atlantic and Pacific Oceans through Nicaragua, 1872-'73. Executive Document No. 57, submitted to the U. S. Senate, 43rd Congress, 1st Session, 1874, by the Department of the Navy. Government Printing Office, 1874. DOI reference https://doi.org/10.5479/sil.824949.390880106858
- Smith, Jean Edward (2001). Grant. New York: Simon & Schuster. ISBN 978-0-684-84927-0.
- White, Ronald C. (2016). American Ulysses: A Life of Ulysses S. Grant. Random House Publishing Group. ISBN 978-1-58836-992-5.

By Editor

- John Davison Lawson, ed. (1921). American State Trials. St. Louis: Thomas Law Book Company.

=== Biographical dictionaries ===
- Erdman Jr., Charles R. (1936). "George Maxwell Robeson (1829–1897)". Dictionary of American Biography. 1. New York City: Charles Scribner's Sons: 31–32.
- Rossiter Johnson, ed. (1906). The Biographical Dictionary of America Robeson, George Maxwell. Vol. IX. Boston, American Biographical Society. p. 138.
- Rossiter, Johnson & Howard, John, eds. (1904). "Robeson, George Maxwell". The Twentieth Century Biographical Dictionary of Notable Americans. IX. Boston: The Biographical Society.

=== Websites ===
- Ault, Jonathan. "The "Virginius Incident"". spanamwar.com.
- "George M. Robeson (1869–1877)". millercenter.org. 4 October 2016.
- "George M. Robeson". April 21, 2016. Archived from the original on 2016-04-21.
- Investigations of the Navy Department, July 25, 1876. Hearing before the House Committee on Naval Affairs, 44th Congress, 1st Session. House Report No. 44-784. Available at https://www.loc.gov/resource/llserialsetce/0712_00_oo-163-0784-0000/?st=gallery. Accessed December 29, 2025.
- U.S.S. Intrepid (1874). Available at https://www.dreadnoughtproject.org/index_php/U.S.S._Intrepid_(1874). Accessed January 4, 2026.

Legal offices
| Preceded by Frederick Frelinghuysen | Attorney General of New Jersey; 1867–1869 | Succeeded by Robert Gilchrist Jr. |
Political offices
| Preceded by Adolph E. Borie | United States Secretary of the Navy; 1869–1877 | Succeeded by Richard W. Thompson |
U.S. House of Representatives
| Preceded by Clement Hall Sinnickson | Member of the U.S. House of Representatives from New Jersey's 1st congressional district 1879–1883 | Succeeded by Thomas M. Ferrell |
Party political offices
| Preceded by William P. Frye | Chair of the House Republican Conference; 1881–1883 | Succeeded by Joseph Cannon |
