= Adolph E. Borie =

US merchant and politician (1809–1880)

Adolph Borie
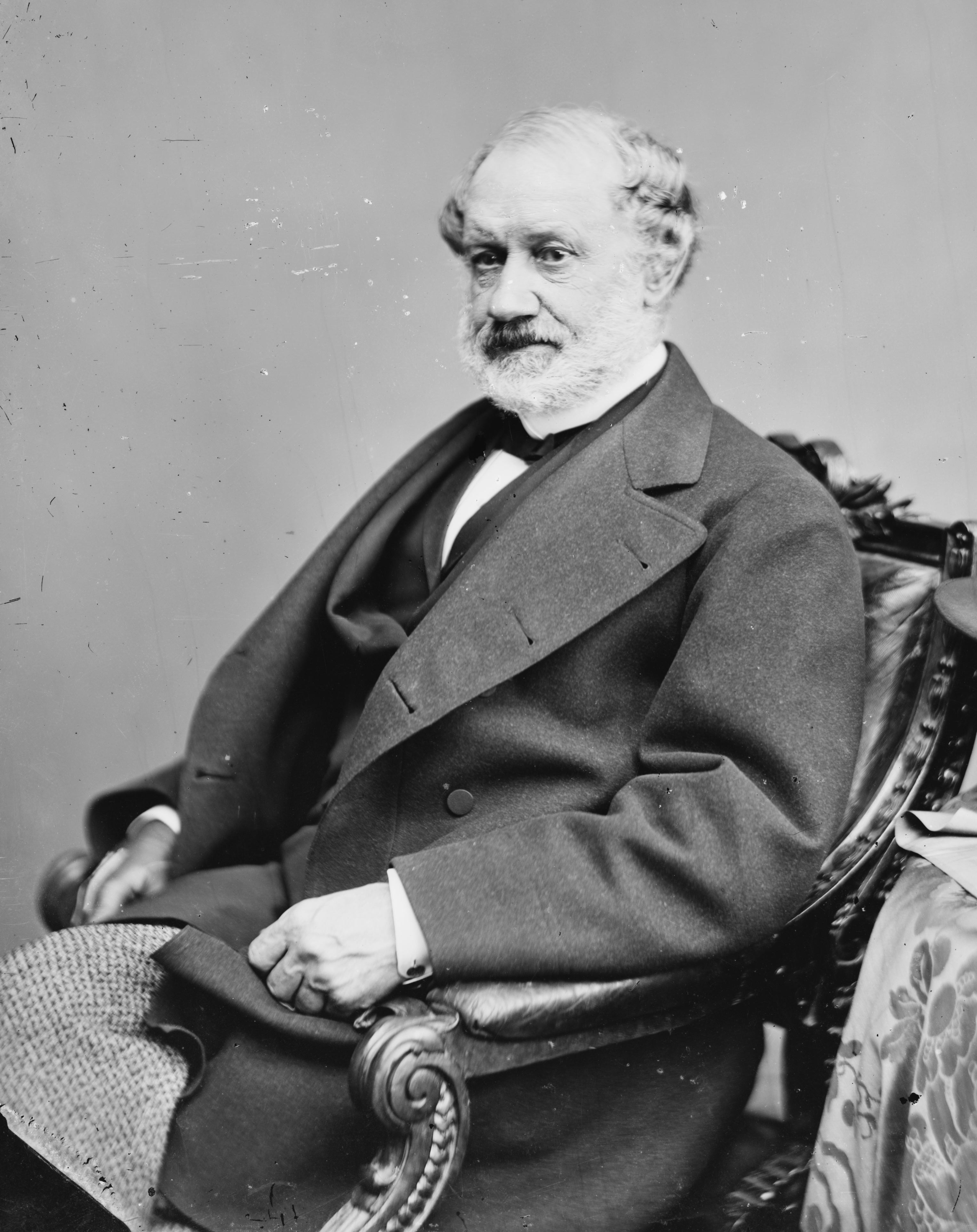

25th United States Secretary of the Navy
- In office March 9, 1869 – June 25, 1869
- President: Ulysses S. Grant
- Preceded by: Gideon Welles
- Succeeded by: George M. Robeson

Personal details
- Born: Adolph Edward Borie; November 25, 1809 Philadelphia, Pennsylvania, U.S.
- Died: February 5, 1880 (aged 70) Philadelphia, Pennsylvania, U.S.
- Resting place: Laurel Hill Cemetery, Philadelphia, Pennsylvania, U.S.
- Party: Whig (Before 1854); Republican (1854–1880)
- Education: University of Pennsylvania (BA)

Adolph Edward Borie (November 25, 1809 – February 5, 1880) was an American merchant and politician who briefly served as Secretary of the Navy in the Ulysses S. Grant administration in 1869.

A native of Philadelphia, Borie was born into the successful mercantile trade business of his father. When the Civil War broke out, Borie became a close associate to General Ulysses S. Grant. Early in Grant's presidential administration, Borie served as Navy Secretary for a few months before stepping down, citing frail health. As Navy Secretary, Borie controversially renamed many naval ships, enforced full pay for an eight-hour work day, and desegregated the Washington Navy Yard, allowing African Americans to freely work alongside whites. He accompanied Grant on his 1877-79 world tour.

Borie died on February 5, 1880, and is buried at Laurel Hill Cemetery in Philadelphia. Two U.S. warships have been named USS Borie.

== Early life, education, and career ==
In 1825, Borie graduated from the University of Pennsylvania at the age of 16.

Borie was born in Philadelphia on November 25, 1809, the eldest of 12 children. He was the son of John Joseph Borie, who emigrated from France's Bordeaux region, settled in Philadelphia and became a leading merchant and manufacturer. His mother was Sophia Beauveau, the daughter of a wealthy Haitian planter who had fled Haiti during the violent Haitian Revolution. Borie came from one of the oldest and most aristocratic families in Pennsylvania.

Borie attended the University of Pennsylvania and graduated in 1825 at the age of 16. At the age of 24 Borie toured Europe and completed his studies in Paris. In 1828, after returning from Europe, Borie entered his father's prestigious mercantile firm McKean Borie & Co. Silk and tea were the emphasized trade commodities during his 30-year tenure in the firm during the epoch of the clipper ships. Borie's firm did trade business with Mexico, the West Indies, and the Far East when Philadelphia foreign trade was at it zenith. Borie was a pioneer in lobbying the federal government for diplomatic and naval support in protecting his business abroad. The magnitude of his business was enormous, identified by $100,000 in property damages incurred during the 1857-58 disturbances of the Second Opium War in China. From 1848 to 1860, Borie was president of The Bank of Commerce and he became the director of several leading business ventures in Philadelphia.

== Marriage ==
On May 23, 1839, Borie married Elizabeth Dundas McKean. The couple had no children.

== Whig politics ==
Before the Civil War, Borie had a slight connection to politics. He championed Whig Party policies and favored protectionist international trade. In 1843, Borie was consul to Belgium. When the Whig Party dissolved in the mid-1850s, Borie became a Republican.

== Civil War ==
Borie supported Republican candidate Abraham Lincoln during the presidential election of 1860. At the outbreak of the Civil War Borie ardently supported the Union cause and Lincoln's presidency. He was a founding member and one-time vice-president of Philadelphia's Union League, and guided the recruiting and equipping of several regiments, inspiring Unionist sentiment. The Philadelphia Union League assumed national importance and inspired other cities to create similar organizations to support the Union war effort against the Confederacy. During the war, Borie became an intimate of Union General Ulysses S. Grant.

== Secretary of Navy 1869 ==
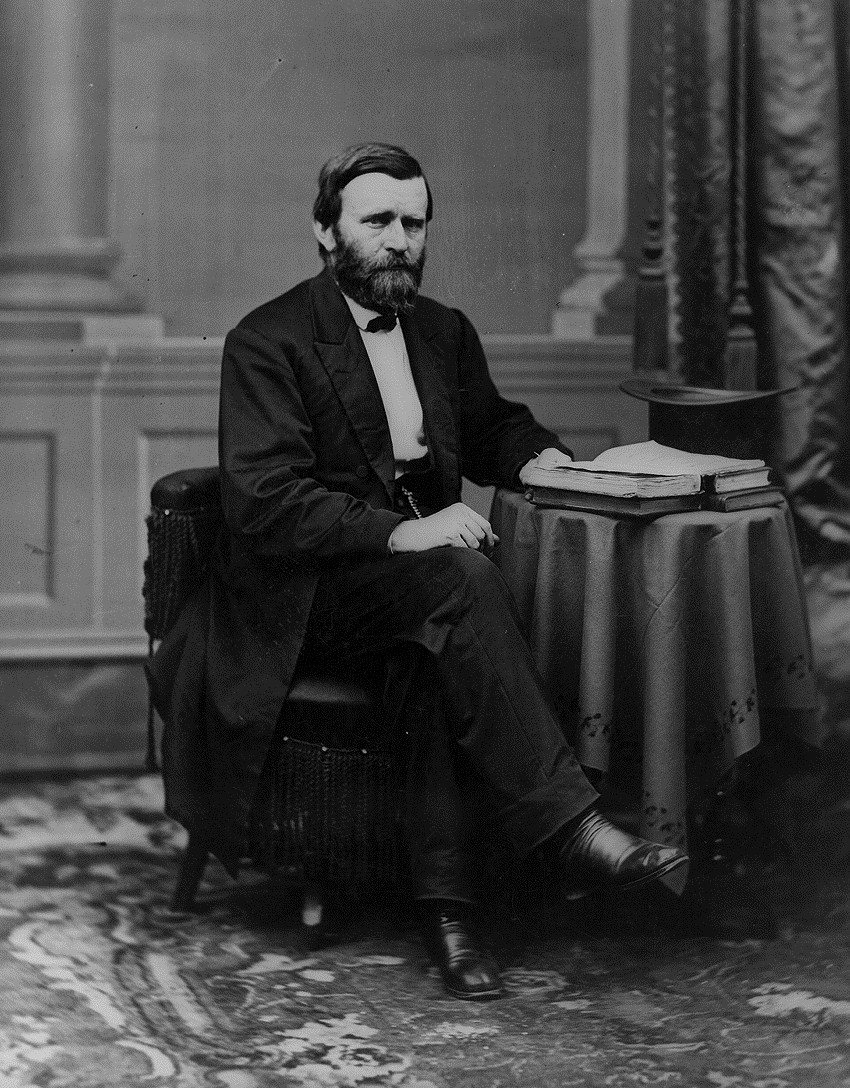
President Ulysses S. Grant

On March 5, 1869, now-President Grant nominated Borie to be Secretary of the Navy. Grant often appointed people who were non-elected or personal friends. For his first cabinet, Grant did not seek advice from Senators in his selections, partly out of national unity, and partly out of his military training to choose cabinet members as subordinates. A few of his nominees were exceptional in their service, most notably his effective Secretary of State Hamilton Fish, Secretary of the Treasury Benjamin Bristow, and Attorney General Alphonso Taft. But, in his initial stages of choosing his 1869 cabinet, it was a hit-or-miss matter. Borie had been very friendly to Grant on a visit to Philadelphia that he chaired. Grant, considering that he owed something to Borie and to the Republicans in the Keystone State announced that there would be a man from Pennsylvania in his cabinet. When pressed for details ("was it a member of the Republican machine under Simon Cameron?") Grant's sense of humor took over and he became mysterious, talking about a "man from Philadelphia".

The question of who was this "man from Philadelphia" bothered the public, but the revelation it was Borie was met with amazement. Nobody had ever heard of him outside of Philadelphia. Borie had little interest in public office, and freely admitted that Admiral David Dixon Porter was the actual manager.

=== Renaming ships controversy ===
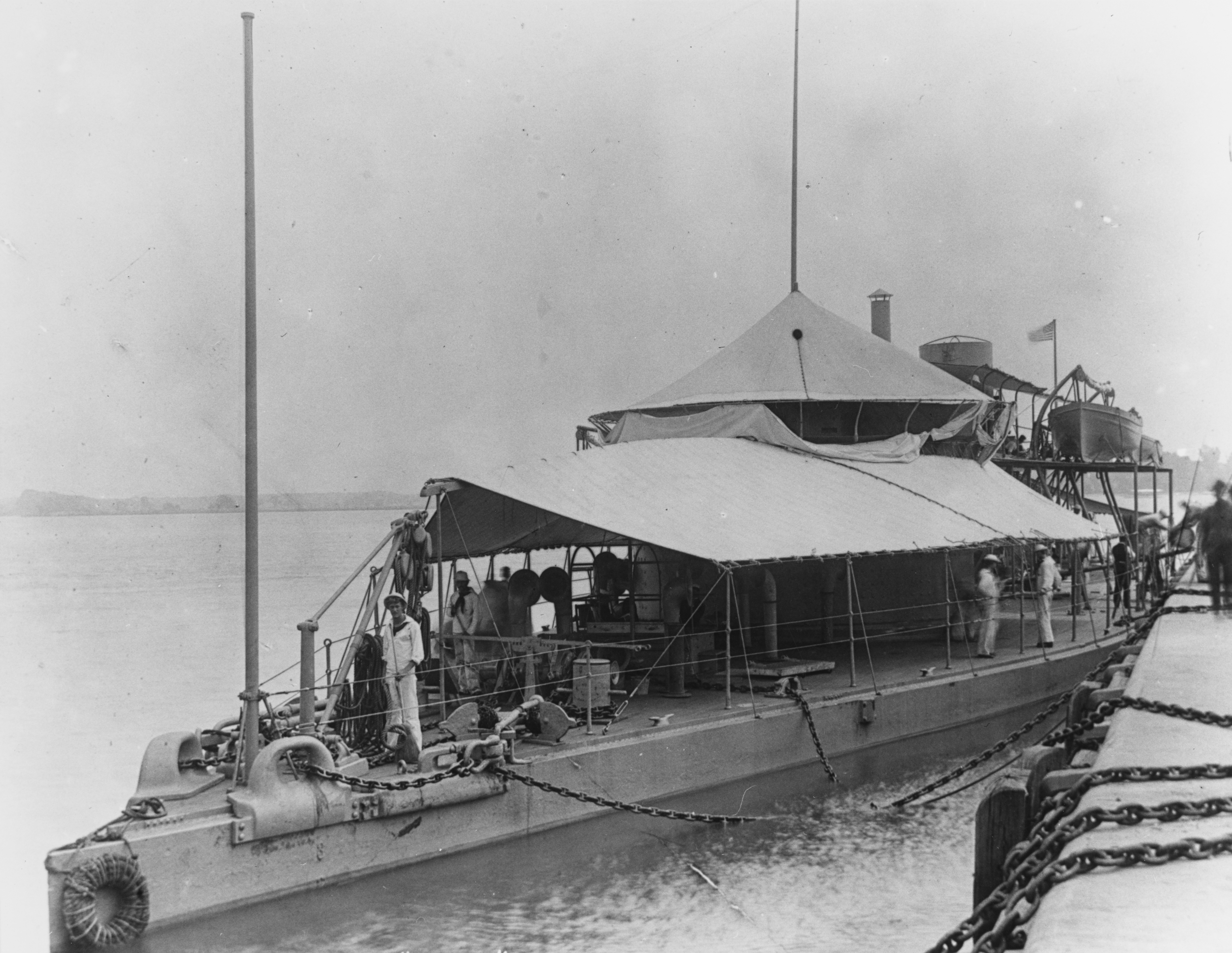
Borie renamed USS Manayunk as USS Ajax on June 15, 1869.

Borie disliked the Native American Indian names borne by so many United States Navy ships of the post-American Civil War era, and during his very short term as Secretary of the Navy, had a great many vessels renamed after states of the Union, creatures and personages from classical Greek or Roman mythology, or names that conveyed power or strength. A sample of names that Borie selected were "Florida", "Centaur", and "Tornado". The general public was shocked on hearing the changes, because it was traditional for American ships to be given American names. His successor, George M. Robeson, had most of these ships reverted to their original names a few months later. Ironically, Borie was a Philadelphian associated with the town of Manayunk (now a Philadelphia neighborhood), and one of the vessels that was never given back its original name was USS Manayunk, which permanently kept its new name of USS Ajax, renamed by Borie on June 15, 1869, ten days before his resignation. Ajax was a mythological Greek hero, the son of King Telamon and Periboea.

=== Enforced full pay and eight-hour work day ===
On May 29, 1869, Borie enforced full pay and the eight-hour work day at the Brooklyn Navy Yard for mechanics and laborers for work per diem. Workers would receive unpaid backpay dating from May 19. Borie gave specific instructions:

1. Workers were to arrive at precisely 7:45 AM
2. Workers were to start work at 8:00 AM and work until 12:00 PM
3. Workers were to take a one-hour lunch break from 12:00 PM to 1:00 PM
4. Workers were to resume work starting at 1:00 PM and ending at 5:00 PM

The preciseness of the working times upset the workers.

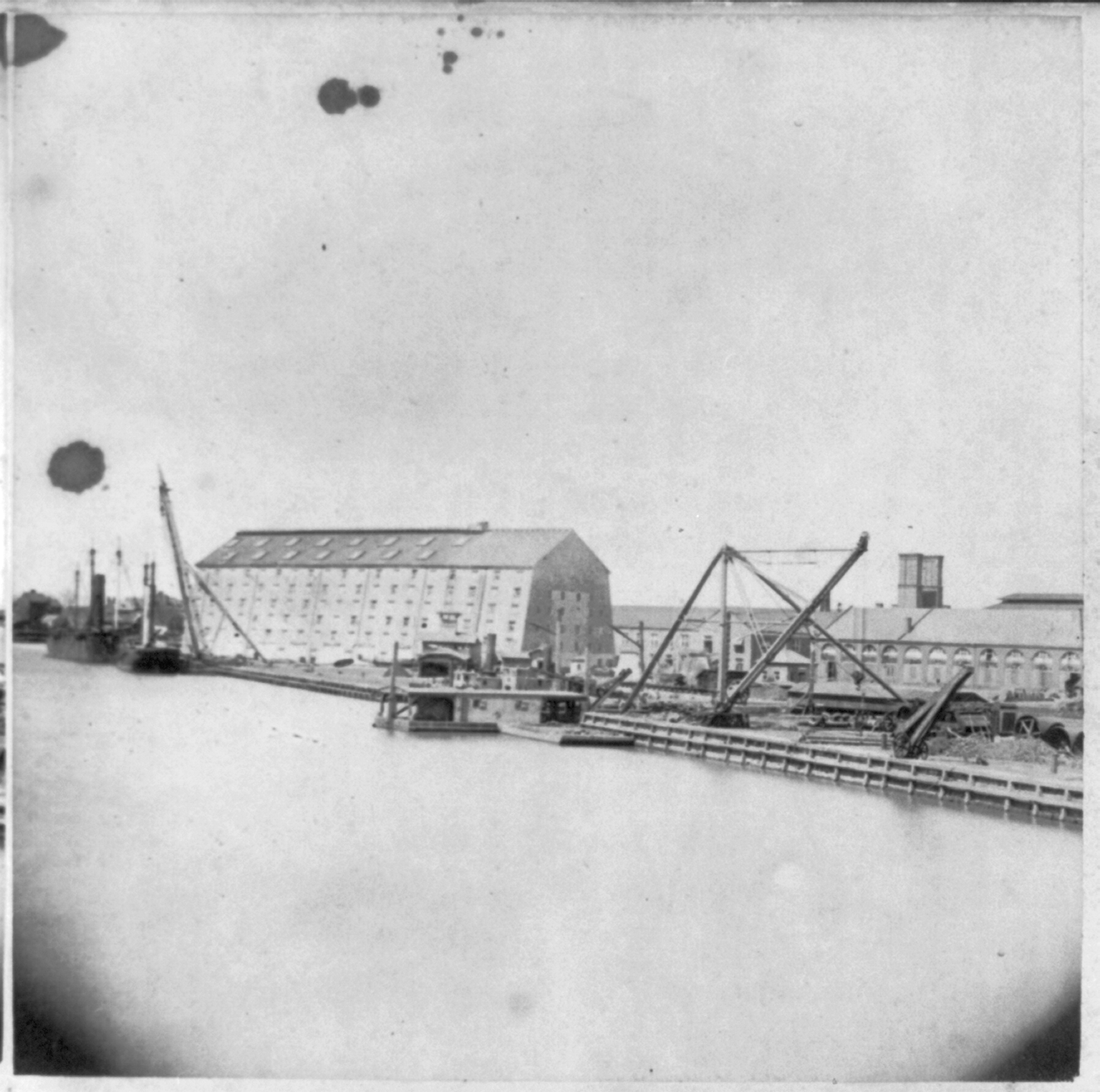
Borie desegregated the Washington Navy Yard in June 1869. Photo taken 1867

=== Desegregated Washington Navy Yard ===
During Borie's brief tenure in office, the United States was going through Reconstruction, after the Civil War. The Thirteenth and Fourteenth Amendments respectively abolished slavery and gave African Americans, former slaves, U.S. citizenship. Controversy ensued as conservative European Americans throughout the nation desired to keep blacks in a condition similar to slavery by violence or coercion and to keep them separate from white society. Women, led by Susan B. Anthony and Elizabeth Cady Stanton, were also fighting to gain higher pay in the federal work force, civil rights in marriage and education, and the right to vote in elections, called suffrage.

In June 1869, during his last month in office, Borie desegregated the Washington Navy Yard, allowing African American males to enter and work in the facilities. Borie was personally thanked by the Working Women's Association on June 17.

=== Resignation ===
On June 25, 1869, Borie quietly resigned office, kept secret from the general public, serving only 3 months and 17 days in office. There was no formal explanation given other than that he was in frail health, running the Navy Department was overall too demanding for him, and he desired to return to his business. When it was announced that George M. Robeson had been nominated and replaced Borie, the public was shocked, not knowing that Borie had even resigned. Also Robeson was not known outside of New Jersey, his home state. Again, Grant did not seek Senate advise when finding an experienced candidate to run the Navy Department. Borie returned to his home in Philadelphia.

== Later career and travels ==
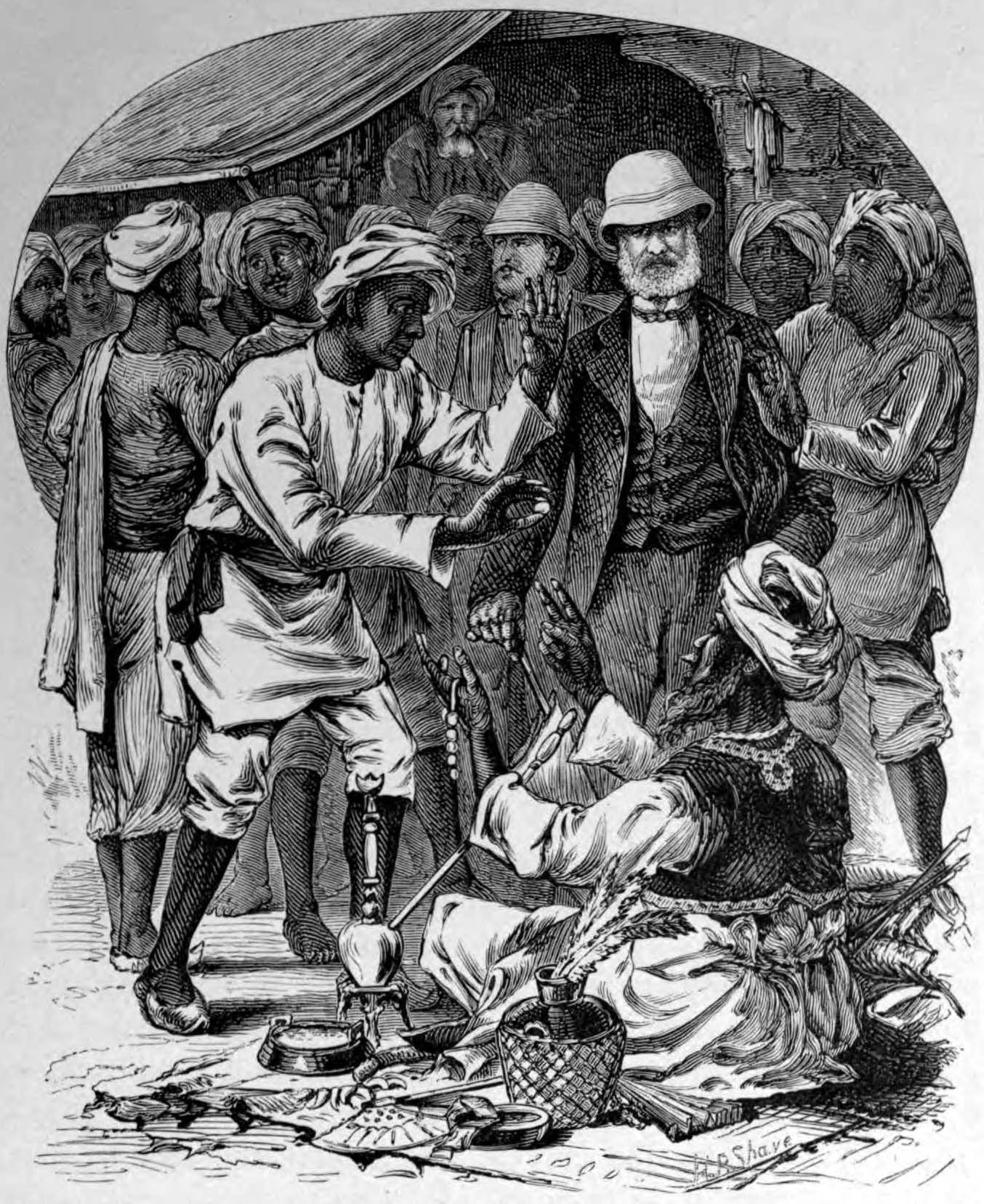
Borie (standing in center foreground) purchasing in India while accompanying Grant on his trip around the world in 1877–1879.

Borie returned to private life and resumed his business interests. In his later business career, he interested himself in railroads and financial concerns. He was a noted patron of the arts. He remained close friends with Grant, whom he joined for much of his world tour in 1877-1879.

In 1872, Borie was elected as a member of the American Philosophical Society.

== Death ==
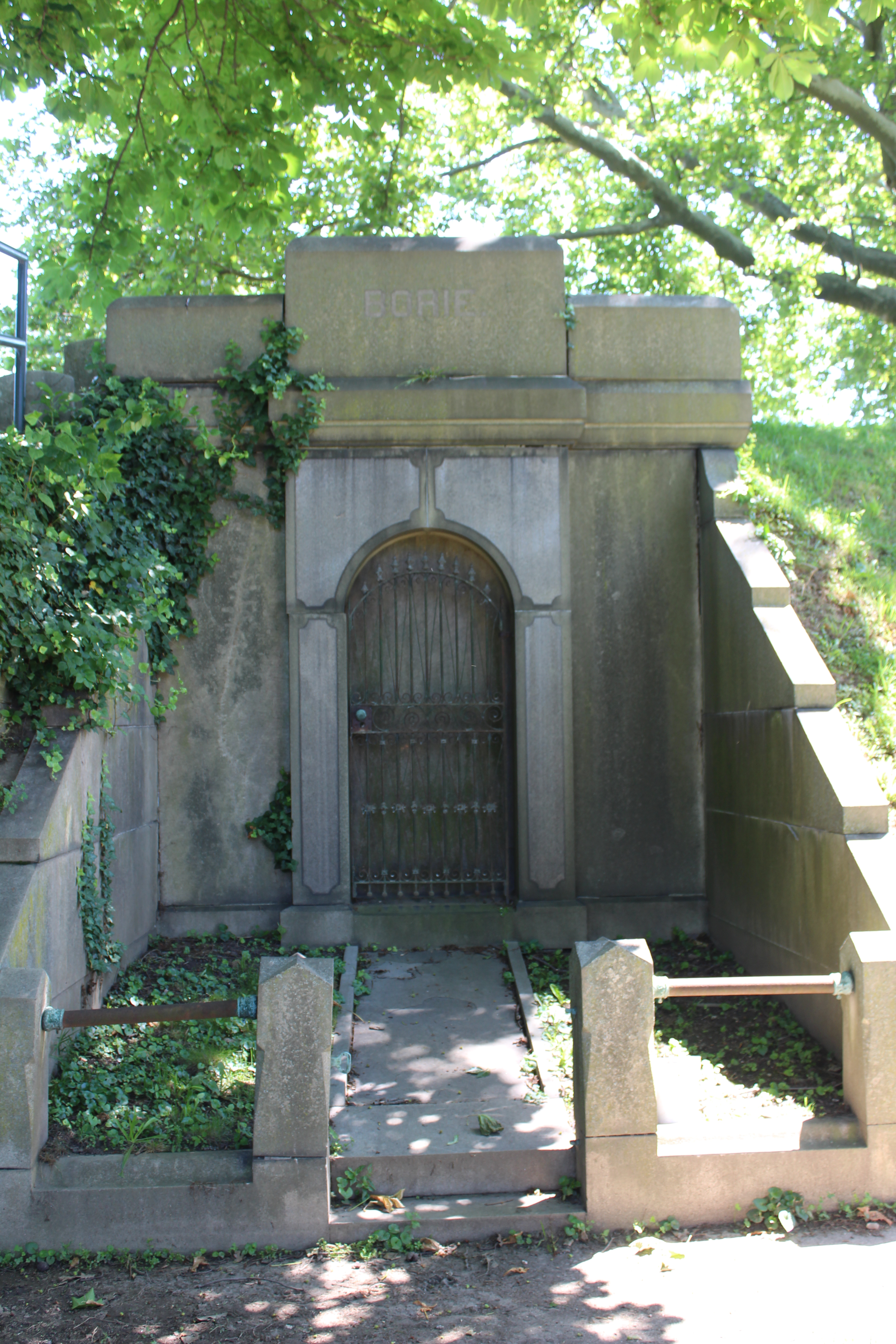
Adolph Borie tomb in Laurel Hill Cemetery

The demands of traveling abroad took a toll on Borie's health. Having returned to Philadelphia, he died on February 5, 1880, and was interred at Laurel Hill Cemetery.

== Sources ==
- Bowden, Witt (1929). Allen Johnson (ed.). Dictionary of American Biography Borie, Adolph Edward. New York: Charles Scribner's Sons. p. 464.
- Bowers, Claude The Tragic Era: The Revolution After Lincoln (New York: Halcyon Press, 1929), p. 238-239.
- Chernow, Ron (2017). Grant. New York: Penguin Press. ISBN 978-1-5942-0487-6.
- Martin, Edward Winslow (1869). "Adolph E. Borie, Secretary of the Navy". The New Administration. New York: George S. Wilcox. pp. 132–137.

=== New York Times ===
- "Labor Movements Workingwoman's Association" (PDF). New York Times. New York. 18 June 1869.
- "The Eight-Hour Law in the Brooklyn Navy-Yard" (PDF). New York Times. New York. 30 May 1869.

Government offices
Preceded by Gideon Welles	United States Secretary of the Navy; 1869	Succeeded by George M. Robeson
