= William Elbridge Sewell =

6th Naval Governor of Guam
- In office February 6, 1903 – January 11, 1904
- Preceded by: Seaton Schroeder
- Succeeded by: Frank Herman Schofield

Personal details
- Born: November 16, 1851
- Died: March 17, 1904 (aged 52)

Military service
- Allegiance: United States
- Branch/service: United States Navy
- Years of service: 1867–1904
- Rank: Commander
- Commands: USS Alarm; Mare Island Observatory; USS Supply
- Battles/wars: Battle of Santiago de Cuba

William Elbridge Sewell (November 16, 1851 – March 17, 1904) was a United States Navy Lieutenant Commander and the 6th Naval Governor of Guam from February 9, 1903, until he returned to the mainland United States for medical treatment on January 11, 1904. He was born in Colchester, New York, and appointed to the United States Naval Academy from that state in 1867. He served on numerous ships before becoming an ensign, and eventually became executive officer or commanding officer of a series of ships and installations. He then became commanding officer of the Guam flagship, and soon after, governor of Guam. As governor, he initiated a series of tax and legal reforms, including many that restored the rights of the native population to practice their culture more freely. He legalized and taxed alcohol and set up a court system that lasted 30 years. In January 1904, he fell ill from intestinal troubles and was transported to California for treatment, where he died while still in office.

== Life ==
Sewell was born November 16, 1851, in Colchester, New York. He married Minnie Moore on October 14, 1890, and had three daughters. His wife died in 1901 when their children were still young. In Guam, Sewell became seriously ill with an intestinal disorder, and was brought to San Francisco, California, for treatment aboard USS Supply. He arrived in California on March 1, 1904, and died shortly after on March 17. His daughter Helen Sewell later became a famous children's book illustrator. Another of his daughters, Marjorie Sewell Cautley, became an acclaimed landscape architect.

== Naval career ==
Sewell was appointed to the United States Naval Academy in 1867 by Congressman William C. Fields. He graduated the academy in 1871. His first post after graduation was aboard USS Congress, where served on a mission to deliver supplies to the Polaris expedition and then to receive a visiting Russian fleet. He then participated in the escort of Hornet, a filibuster vessel, out of a Spanish blockade in Port-au-Prince that aimed to capture it. Congress joined the European Squadron, and Sewell was transferred to USS Plymouth, where he served for seven months before being transferred once again to USS Wabash. He remained there thirteen months before being reposted back to Congress.

Following the Virginius Affair, Congress sailed to Key West, where Sewell took part in several drills and exercises on the Florida Bay before returning to Norfolk, Virginia, aboard USS Ticonderoga. There he became an ensign and began assisting in deep-sea exploration and sounding of the Gulf of Mexico and Gulf of Maine. In 1878, he was ordered shortly to USS Passaic and subsequently USS Alaska, where he cruised the Pacific Ocean for three years. In 1881 he became executive officer of USS Alarm, and in 1882 became commanding officer of the vessel, his first command.

In 1882 and 1883, he served at the United States Naval Observatory. From there he was ordered to USS Ossipee during its tour of Asian ports. For his services aboard this ship he received a commendatory letter from the Secretary of the Navy. In April 1891, he relinquished command of the Mare Island Observatory and reported for a tour of China aboard USS Lancaster. From July 1894 to May 1897 he once again commanded the Mare Island Observatory, where he was placed in charge of accurate time keeping for the West Coast of the United States and distribution of marine chronometers to ships in the Pacific Fleet. On June 1, 1897, he became navigator for USS Montgomery, serving only until July 12 of the same year before becoming executive officer of USS Vesuvius and then executive officer of USS Topeka until March 1899. He participated in the Battle of Santiago de Cuba, for which he received commendation from commanding Admiral William T. Sampson.

From March 1899 to June 1900 he served as executive officer of USS Abarenda, on which he sailed to American Samoa. He was in Pago Pago when the United States assumed control of the island chain. In 1900, he served in equipment department of the Brooklyn Navy Yard and then equipment officer at the Portsmouth Naval Shipyard. He later became commanding officer of USS Supply, which became the flagship for Guam when he became governor.

== Governorship ==
During his term as governor, Sewell issued twenty-four orders, most of them concerned with taxes. He conducted major overhauls of the taxation, criminal code, and prison system. He also repealed a number of laws limiting the practice of native Guamanian culture, including once again allowing United States military personnel to live among the Chamorro people and allowing the Caroline Islands to wear native clothing and participate in cockfights. At first, he raised the property taxes, which had only been one percent under Spanish rule, which caused many natives to default and lose their land. After a series of crop failures caused economic hardship on the island, he reduced property taxes by fifty percent.

He also issued a number of corporate reforms. He legalized alcohol, allowing its manufacture and sale given the government issue of a special license to do so. He continued the unpopular policy of keeping those with leprosy separate from the general populace and improved the judicial laws of the island with General Order 69 on November 30, 1903. The court system he set up lasted until the 1930s. Under his administration, the first telegraph cable reached the island. On March 18, 1904, Sewell died while in office.

Military offices
Preceded by Seaton Schroeder	Naval Governor of Guam; 1903–1904	Succeeded by George Leland Dyer
