= Belvidere Cemetery =

Cemetery in Belvidere, New Jersey, USA

Coordinates: 40.8271°N 75.0685°W

Details
- Established: 1834
- Location: Belvidere, New Jersey
- Country: United States

Belvidere Cemetery is a cemetery located in Belvidere, in Warren County, New Jersey that was founded in 1834. It includes many graves of people who fought in the American Revolutionary War.

== Notable interments ==
- Charlie Berry (1902–1972), Major League Baseball catcher from 1925 to 1938; MLB umpire; NFL linesman.
- Niccolo Alicandri (1973-2022), Cofounder of CipherTechs, Inc. His wife Sarah Langan (1975 to 2021) is also interned there.
- Henry S. Harris (1850–1902), U.S. Representative from New Jersey's 4th congressional district, 1881–83.
- John Patterson Bryan Maxwell (1804–1845), U.S. Representative from New Jersey at-large, 1837–39, 1841–43.
- George M. Robeson (1829–1897), Union general during the Civil War, Secretary of the Navy during the Ulysses S. Grant presidency.
- Onion John Local hermit and Character of a book of the same name.
