= HMS Polyphemus (1881) =

Victorian Royal Navy warship

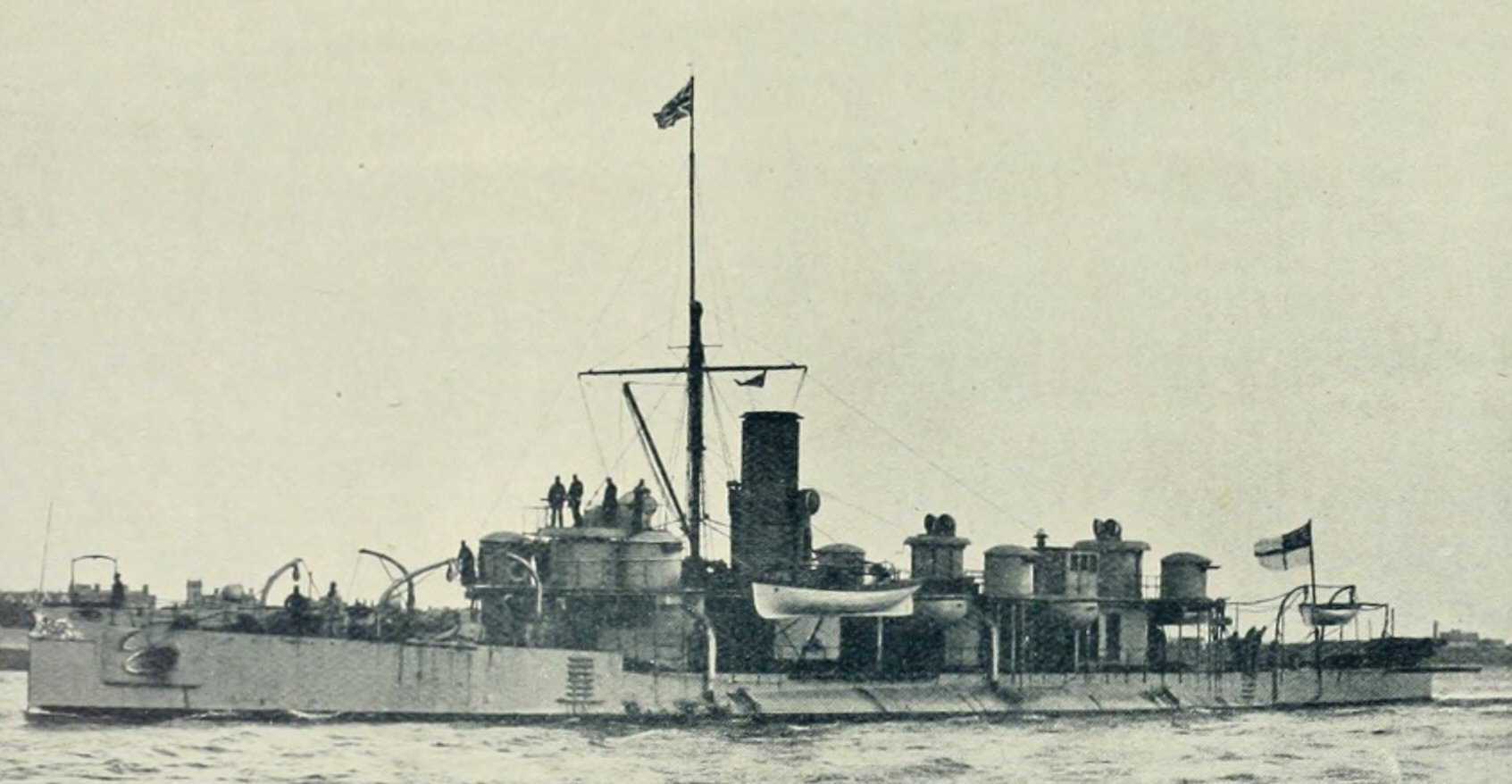
- HMS Polyphemus

History

United Kingdom
- Builder: Chatham Dockyard
- Laid down: 1878
- Launched: 15 June 1881
- Fate: Sold for breaking up 7 July 1903

General characteristics
- Displacement: 2,640 tons
- Length: 240 ft (73 m)
- Beam: 37 ft (11 m)
- Draught: 20 ft 6 in (6.25 m)
- Speed: 17.8 knots maximum
- Endurance: "capable of making a passage in any weather from Plymouth to Gibraltar, or from Gibraltar to Malta at 10 knots without assistance"
- Complement: 80
- Armament: 5 × 14-inch torpedo tubes, 18 torpedoes; 6 × 1-inch Nordenfelt guns; ram
- Armour: deck 3 inches compound armour, hatch coamings 4 inches, conning tower 8 inches

The third HMS Polyphemus was a Royal Navy torpedo ram, serving from 1881 until 1903. A shallow-draft, fast, low-profile vessel, she was designed to penetrate enemy harbours at speed and sink anchored ships. Designed by Nathaniel Barnaby primarily as a protected torpedo boat, the ram was provided very much as secondary armament.

It has been suggested that H. G. Wells’ fictional HMS Thunder Child from his novel The War of the Worlds may have been based on this ship, in part because he described Thunder Child as an ironclad torpedo ram, and Polyphemus was the only ship of this type which the Royal Navy possessed. However, Wells may have been using the term loosely, given that numerous European warships were described as either 'torpedo rams' or 'torpedo ram cruisers'; an example of the former being Tordenskjold and the latter including Giovanni Bausan. This explanation is more likely given that the fictional ship does not match the other particulars, such as number of funnels, size and weaponry, of HMS Polyphemus.

== Design ==
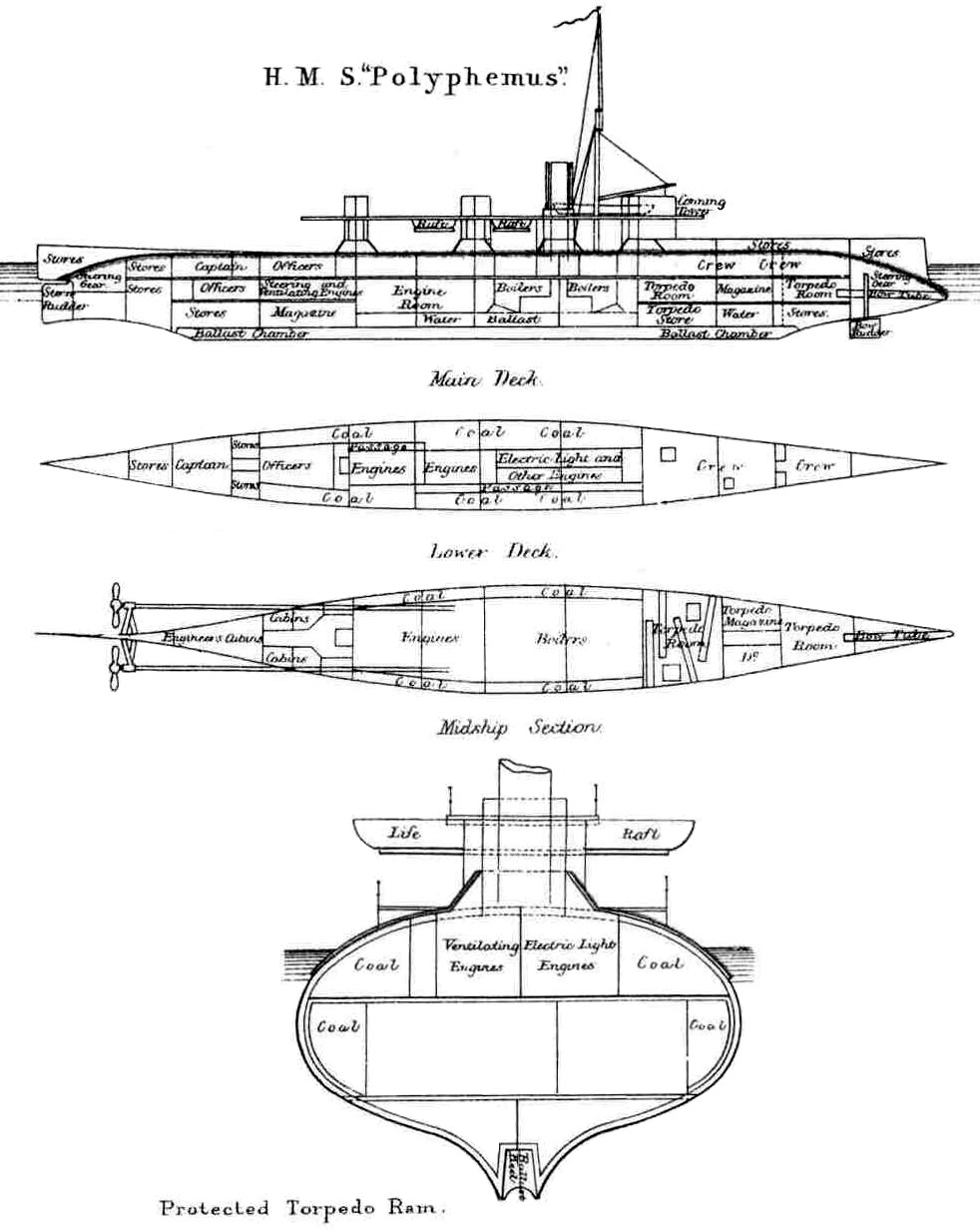
The layout of Polyphemus as depicted in Brasseys Naval Annual 1888

The Admiralty set up the "Torpedo Committee" in 1872 to examine ways in which the newly invented Whitehead torpedo could be launched at sea. The Royal Navy's first purpose-built torpedo launching ship was HMS Vesuvius, which, with a maximum speed of less than 10 knots, was intended to stealthily approach within a few hundred yards of enemy ships at night to launch her torpedoes.

Leading on from this, in the mid-1870s Barnaby and his assistant J Dunn proposed a fast cigar-shaped vessel with five submerged torpedo tubes and protected by 2 inches of armour over the deck. The design was modified in late 1875 into a larger vessel equipped with a ram. Early in 1876 the design was modified again into a 240-foot-long (73 m) unarmoured torpedo ram with a top speed of 17 knots. Later the design was modified yet again to have armour added to the exposed steel deck.

The ship was equipped with a 250-ton cast iron keel which could be released in an emergency to increase the buoyancy of the hull. It was held in place by two spindles which both had to be turned to release the keel and which were tested fortnightly.

The ship was equipped with twin boiler and engine rooms, and a low turtle-back hull which was almost submerged when the vessel was travelling at speed, and had a normal bunker capacity of 200 tons of coal, and 300 tons maximum.

== Construction and planned sister-ships ==
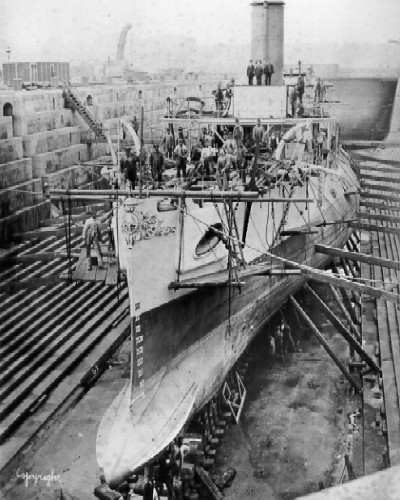
HMS Polyphemus in dry dock

Polyphemus was ordered on 5 February 1878 and laid down on 21 September 1878 at Chatham Naval Dockyard. She was launched on 15 June 1881 and completed in September 1882. A second ship to the same design was ordered from Chatham on 30 December 1881 but was cancelled on 10 November 1882 without being either laid down or named. A third order to the same design was placed at Chatham on 6 March 1885, to have been named HMS Adventure; this was cancelled on 12 August 1885.

== Armament ==
The ship had five submerged 14-inch-diameter torpedo tubes, and carried 18 Mark II torpedoes. With a range of just 600 yards, these had a 26-pound guncotton charge and a speed of 18 knots, only marginally faster than Polyphemus.

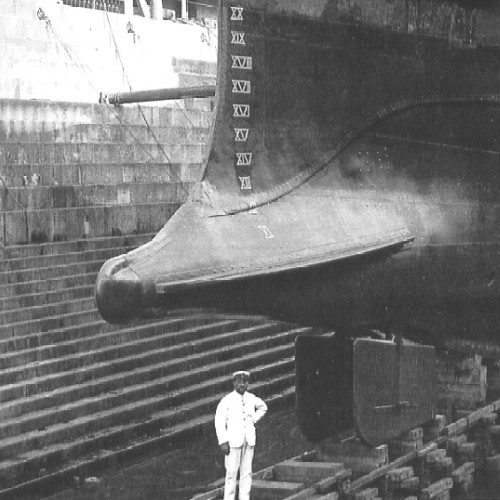
HMS Polyphemus' ram and bow rudders. A torpedo tube ran down the centre of the ram.

The centre torpedo tube was fitted with a combined cast steel bow cap and ram. It hinged upwards to open, and considerable effort went into selecting the best hydrodynamic design through model testing since its size and location were found to have a major impact on the ship’s performance. It had the same effect on Polyphemus’ hull as the bulbous bow fitted to many modern ships.

The bow also had a balanced two-bladed rudder fitted into it, which could be retracted into the hull, that allowed the ship to be manoeuvrable when going astern. It also slightly reduced the diameter of the turning circle (by 12 per cent) when the ship was moving forwards.

Her original gun armament consisted of 6 twin-barreled Nordenfelt 25mm (1-inch) automatic guns, although later in the 1880s they were replaced by 6 single Hotchkiss 3-pounder (47mm) quick-firing guns. Her deck was armoured with 3 inches (76.2mm) of armour plate. This armament was consistent with slightly later torpedo boats, although they usually carried fewer guns.

== Other innovations ==
The ship was the first Royal Navy vessel to be fitted with 80-volt electric lighting. This was adopted by the Royal Navy in 1882 following a fatal electrocution aboard HMS Inflexible, which had an 800-volt circuit.

The vessel was fitted with a flying deck which housed the bridge and machine guns. It was designed so that if the vessel sank it would float off as two seaworthy rafts.

== Operational history ==
HMS Polyphemus served with the Mediterranean Fleet. She was paid off at Chatham Dockyard in January 1900, then visited Malta before she was back in home waters three months later. In April 1902 she was employed as tender to HMS Defiance, torpedo school at Devonport.

=== 1885 Berehaven trial ===
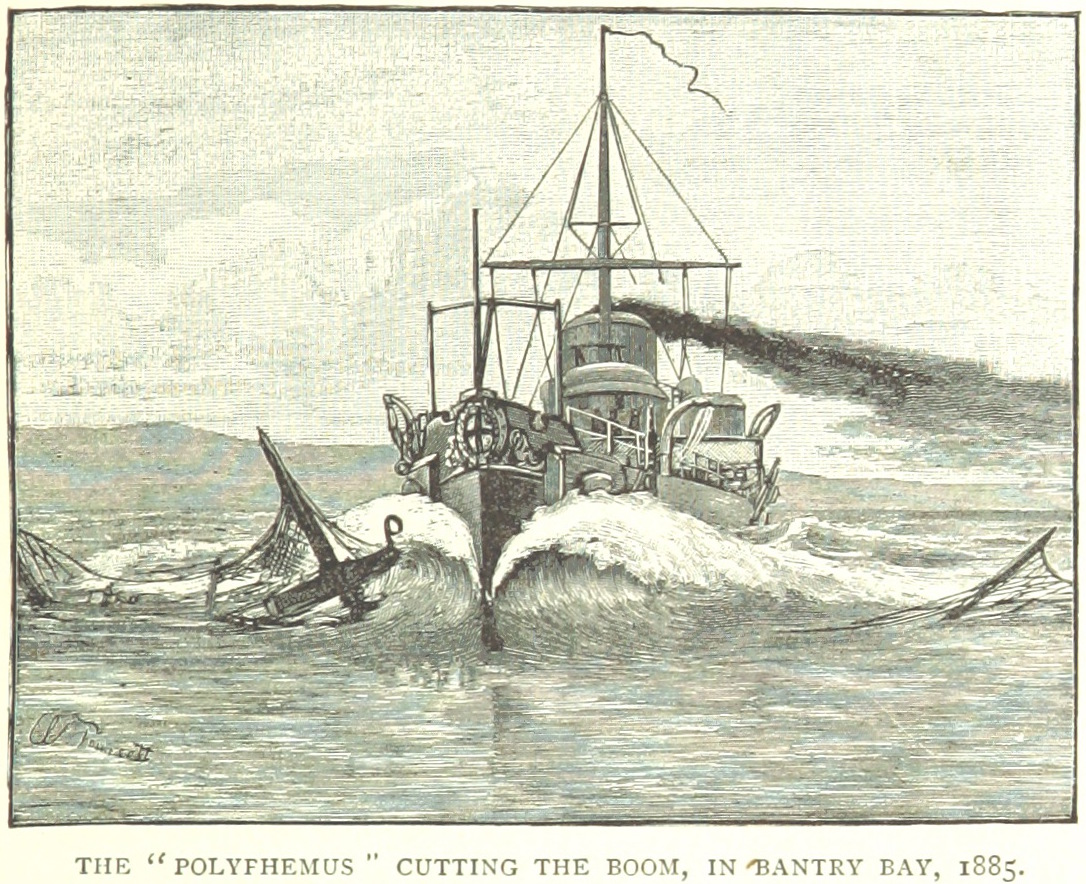
Polyphemus cuts through a boom during the trial

In 1885 the ship undertook a simulated attack on a fleet at anchor at Berehaven. The principal object of this was to test tactics for a possible attack on Kronstadt Harbour in the event of the threatened war with Russia. Booms and nets (to catch propellers) were laid across the channel behind Bereshaven, along with small observation mines and the area covered by machine guns and torpedo boats. Polyphemus launched a simulated attack on 30 June, evading around ten torpedoes fired by 6 torpedo boats during her two-mile run-in and easily smashed through the booms and a 5-inch steel hawser holding them in place.

Despite this success, no further vessels were ordered by the Royal Navy, possibly because the development of quick-traversing and quick-firing guns as she entered service had rendered the concept behind her design less practical. When she was designed, the only guns capable of penetrating her armour were too slow to train and fire to have much chance of hitting such a fast-moving ship, but by the time that she entered service a few years later, this was no longer true.
