= Charlie Berry =

American athlete and sports official (1902–1972)

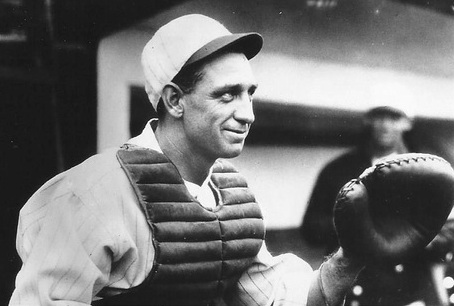
- Berry in 1932
- Catcher
- Born: October 18, 1902; Phillipsburg, New Jersey, U.S.
- Died: September 6, 1972 (aged 69); Evanston, Illinois, U.S.
- Batted: Right Threw: Right

MLB debut
- June 15, 1925, for the Philadelphia Athletics

Last MLB appearance
- September 8, 1938, for the Philadelphia Athletics

MLB statistics
- Batting average: .267
- Home runs: 23
- Runs batted in: 256
- Stats at Baseball Reference

Teams
- Philadelphia Athletics (1925); Boston Red Sox (1928–1932); Chicago White Sox (1932–1933); Philadelphia Athletics (1934–1936, 1938)
Football career
No. 17, 20
Position	End
Personal information
Listed height	6 ft 0 in (1.83 m)
Listed weight	185 lb (84 kg)
Career information
College	Lafayette
Career history
Pottsville Maroons (1925–1926)
Awards and highlights
Collier's Magazine: First-team All-NFL (1925); 2× GB Press-Gazette: First-team All-NFL (1925, 1926); Collier's Magazine: Third-team All-NFL (1926); First-team All-American (1924)
College Football Hall of Fame

Charles Francis Berry (October 18, 1902 – September 6, 1972) was an American athlete and sports official who enjoyed careers as a catcher and umpire in Major League Baseball and as an end and official in the National Football League. His father, Charlie Sr., was a second baseman who played in the Union Association in 1884.

== Career ==
Born in Phillipsburg, New Jersey, Berry attended Phillipsburg High School and ultimately accomplished the rare feat of officiating in both the NFL Championship Game and the World Series in the same year.

=== Football ===
While in college as a star on the Lafayette team, he was named to the final Walter Camp All-America football team as an end in 1924. In 1925–26, he starred for the Pottsville Maroons of the NFL, leading the league in scoring in 1925 with 74 points. During the 1925 NFL season, the Maroons played a game against the top college football team, a group of All-Stars from the University of Notre Dame. This team featured the famed Four Horsemen as was seen as the best team in the country. At the time, college football was seen as consisting of superior talent over the professionals. The hard-fought contest was decided in the last minute of the game. Down a point, Berry kicked a 30-yard field goal to upset college's best team 9–7. The Maroons' victory over the Irish ensured that the NFL now had the credibility to exist on equal standing with college football. Unfortunately, the game resulted in the Maroons being stripped of their NFL title due to a disputed rules violation.

=== Baseball ===
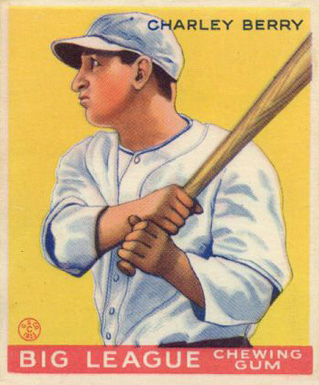
A 1933 Goudey trading card of Berry

Berry started his major league career with ten games for the Philadelphia Athletics in 1925 but didn't return to the majors until after his football career ended, playing for Portland and Dallas minor league teams in 1926–27. He also played for the Boston Red Sox (1928–32), Chicago White Sox (1932–33) and again with the Athletics (1934–36). He became an Athletics coach under manager Connie Mack from 1936 to 1940, making his last playing appearance in 1938. A right-handed hitter, he posted a .267 batting average with 23 home runs and 256 runs batted in in 709 major league games. At Mack's suggestion, he managed the Wilmington Blue Rocks (of which Mack was vice president) for the last half of the 1940 season, finishing second in the Interstate League, but was discouraged by Mack from pursuing his goal of a managing career due to the high turnover rate in the profession. In addition to his brief managerial career, Berry was the football coach at Grove City College for five seasons in the 1930s.

=== Official ===
Following his playing and coaching career, Berry became an umpire in the American League from 1942 through 1962. He officiated in five World Series (1946, 1950, 1954, 1958, 1962) and five All-Star Games (1944, 1948, 1952, 1956, second 1959 game), calling balls and strikes for the first half of the 1948 and 1956 games. He was the third base umpire for the one-game playoff to decide the 1948 AL pennant, and after becoming a league umpiring supervisor, he returned to the field for the first game of the 1970 American League Championship Series during an umpires' strike, working the outfield. On July 1, 1951, he was behind the plate when Bob Feller became the first pitcher to throw three no-hitters in the AL; Berry later worked the bases for four more no-hitters. At the same time, he was a head linesman for the NFL for 24 seasons, officiating in 12 championship games, including the renowned "Sudden Death" championship game between the Baltimore Colts and New York Giants in 1958. In fact, he is the only man to have officiated the World Series, the NFL Championship and the College All-Star game in one year.

He credited his success as an official to his attention to the rules, noting, "Every morning, right after I got up, I would open the rule book and read. I'd open the book at random and start reading a few pages. I did the same thing when I was in the NFL." While admitting his own general ignorance of the rules when he had been playing, he added, "All during my umpiring and officiating career I was astounded by the number of players who had only a casual acquaintance with the rules. And it caused a lot of needless trouble on the field."

Bill Haller, who worked as an AL umpire from 1961 to 1982, recalled that Berry was his boyhood hero and inspiration to pursue umpiring, even though growing up in Lockport, Illinois he never met him in his youth: "Berry went to school with the father of my best friend, Jack Ernst. I was about 11 years old and I heard so much from Mr. Ernst about Berry. I used to umpire the kid games around the neighborhood and later on I umpired the semi-pro games around Lockport."

After retiring from umpiring in 1962, Berry also worked as an observer of NFL officials. He died of a heart attack at his son-in-law's home in Evanston, Illinois at the age of 69, after suffering a stroke three months earlier. He was interred in Belvidere Cemetery in Belvidere, New Jersey.

He was inducted into the College Football Hall of Fame in 1980.

== Head coaching record ==
=== College football ===
Year	Team	Overall	Conference	Standing	Bowl/playoffs
Grove City Crimson/Wolverines (Independent) (1927–1931)
1927	Grove City	5–2–1			
1928	Grove City	4–1–3			
1929	Grove City	6–1–2			
1930	Grove City	7–2			
1931	Grove City	5–1–2			
Grove City:		28–7–8			
Total:		28–7–8			

== See also ==
- Boston Red Sox all-time roster
- Chicago White Sox all-time roster
- History of the New York Giants
- List of second-generation Major League Baseball players
