= Thomas Lee (New Jersey politician) =

American politician

Thomas Lee (November 28, 1780 – November 2, 1856) was an American Jacksonian Party politician who represented New Jersey at large in the United States House of Representatives for two terms from 1833 to 1837.

== Early life and career ==
Lee was born in Philadelphia, Pennsylvania on November 28, 1780. He resided in Chester Valley, Pennsylvania during his earlier years and attended the common schools. He moved to Leesburg, New Jersey (within Maurice River Township), about 1798 and to Port Elizabeth in 1805.

He became a merchant, shipbuilder, and landowner. He was a judge of the Court of Common Pleas from 1813 to 1815 and a member of the New Jersey General Assembly in 1814 and 1815. He was postmaster of Port Elizabeth from 1818 to 1833 and 1846–1849.

== U.S. House of Representatives ==
Lee was elected as a Jacksonian to the Twenty-third and Twenty-fourth Congresses, serving in office from March 4, 1833 – March 3, 1837, and was chairman of the Committee on Accounts in the Twenty-fourth Congress.

== Later life and death ==
He was founder of Port Elizabeth Library and Academy. He died in Port Elizabeth on November 2, 1856, and was interred in the Methodist Episcopal Churchyard.

U.S. House of Representatives
Preceded by Lewis Condict	Member of the U.S. House of Representatives from New Jersey's at-large congressional district 1833–1837	Succeeded by John P. B. Maxwell
