= HMS Thunder Child =

Fictional warship in The War of the Worlds by H. G. Wells

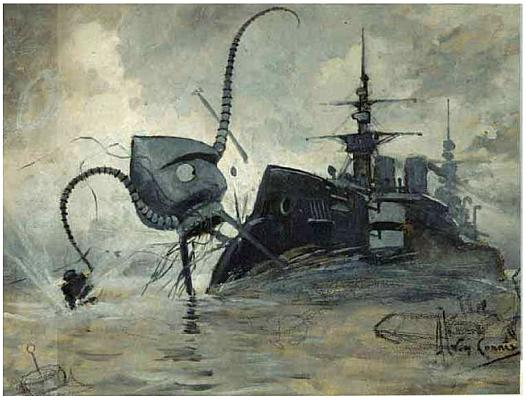
A Henrique Alvim Corrêa illustration from a 1906 edition of the book.

HMS Thunder Child is a fictional ironclad of the Royal Navy, destroyed by Martian fighting-machines in H. G. Wells' 1898 novel The War of the Worlds whilst protecting a refugee rescue fleet of civilian vessels. Thunder Child draws similarities with, and may have been inspired by, HMS Polyphemus, which was the sole torpedo ram to see service with the Royal Navy from 1881 to 1903.

== Fictional description ==
In the novel Wells gives only a rough description of the ship. During the portion where the narrator describes his brother's perspective, he introduces the reader to the Thunder Child in chapter 17, describing it thus: "About a couple of miles out lay an ironclad, very low in the water, almost, to my brother's perception, like a water-logged ship. This was the ram Thunder Child". A few paragraphs later, it is stated that "It was the torpedo ram, Thunder Child, steaming headlong, coming to the rescue of the threatened shipping". The battle takes place off the mouth of the River Blackwater, Essex, where people from London are escaping the Martian offensive by sea. Three Martian fighting-machines having approached the vessels from the seaward side. HMS Thunder Child signals to the main fleet and steams at full speed towards the Martians without firing. The Martians, whom the narrator suggests are unfamiliar with large warships (having come from an arid planet) at first use only a gas attack. When this fails to have any effect, they employ their Heat-Ray, inflicting fatal damage on the Thunder Child. The ship continues to attack, bringing down one of the fighting machines with its gun, even as it succumbs. The flaming wreckage of the ironclad finally rams into a second fighting-machine, destroying it. When the black smoke and super-heated steam banks dissipate, both the Thunder Child and the third fighting-machine are gone. The attack by Thunder Child occupies the Martians long enough for three Royal Navy warships of the main Channel Fleet to arrive.

== Analysis ==
Elana Gomel describes the scene involving Thunder Child's attack against the Martians as "one of the great depictions of modern warfare in world literature". According to her, the scene is "rendered through an almost cinematic montage of many partial and distorted viewpoints", resulting in a chapter that "feels strikingly modern". A similar view is expressed by Leslie Sheldon, who calls the scene "almost cinematic".

According to Gomel, the scene involving Thunder Child, with its "scriptural descriptions" of events, also demonstrates how The War of the Worlds as a whole is "permeated" by a metaphorical apocalypse that "echoes of the Bible". Despite the apocalyptic nature of the story, Gomel observes that, as a whole, the novel's happy ending (a unique feature among Wells’ novels) describes the technological advances stemming from the invasion as being beneficial for the whole world. Along similar lines, Nathaniel Otjen uses Thunder Child as an example of how Wells' writing "imagines the collapse of fossil fuel modernity and explores alternate forms of energy". According to Otjen, Wells depicts how the fossil fuel technology represented by Thunder Child is only able to combat the Martians' non-fossil fuel technology by mimicking it.

Larrie D. Ferreiro describes how Thunder Child's use of a ram, while a "standard fixture" in ships between 1870 and World War I and extensively discussed by naval officers of the era, is in reality an "illusory" "armchair tactic". Ferreiro bases his stance on an observation that such ramming attacks were "almost never" used effectively in real life, with the notable exception of the sinking of the Chilean corvette Esmeralda during the Battle of Iquique. John Fidler reaches a similar conclusion, describing how Thunder Child's success in damaging its enemy with a ramming attack stands in contrast to the near-complete lack of success by real-world vessels designed for ramming.

Garry Young considers Thunder Child's demise in combat against the Martians in the context of ethics of killer robots, describing Thunder Child's destruction as exemplifying "behaviour as (outwardly) dignified in the face of indignity". According to Young, "the ironclad (and its anonymous crew) is depicted as dying a valiant death against a faceless and non-human enemy, to the sound of cheers from the fearful audience looking on." Young argues that Thunder Child's crew's death should be considered dignified irrespective of whether the Martians are able to recognize or value the humanity of Thunder Child's crew.

== Adaptations ==
HMS Thunder Child is commonly omitted from some adaptations or replaced outright with technology more appropriate to the updated settings.

In Orson Welles's famous 1938 radio adaptation of The War of the Worlds, a Boeing B-17 Flying Fortress heavy bomber replaces Thunder Child; it collides with a fighting-machine after being critically damaged by its Heat-Ray.

In the George Pal 1953 film adaptation, the last-ditch defense against the Martians is an atomic bomb dropped by a Thunder Child replacement, a Northrop YB-49 Flying Wing jet bomber; the atomic bomb proves useless, because the Martian fighting-machines are protected by individual force fields.

The first adaptation to feature HMS Thunder Child was Jeff Wayne's Musical Version of ''The War of the Worlds'', which was released in 1978 and retains the novel's Victorian setting, characters, and situations. The album features the song, "Thunder Child". The album's cover art depicts a Canopus-class battleship fighting a Martian tripod. The War of the Worlds was written as an account of fictional events early in the 20th century (possibly the summer of 1901) and the lead ship of the class, HMS Canopus, entered service in 1899 and thus fits the timeline.

The 1999 video game adaptation of Jeff Wayne's musical features a level revolving around Thunder Child. The player is placed in control of the ironclad and must sail it down a river while using its cannons to destroy Martian machines and settlements; the level ends in a climactic confrontation with Tempest, a powerful Martian war machine.

In Steven Spielberg's 2005 film adaptation, War of the Worlds, contemporary American military forces use tanks and attack helicopters against the alien Tripods, again without success. Earlier in the film, civilian ferries trying to escape from the Tripods are trapped and easily sunk, with no intervention by a warship.

The direct-to-DVD Pendragon feature adaptation of the novel, released in 2005, uses CGI to portray HMS Thunder Child as a Royal Navy Havock-class destroyer.

In the BBC's 2019 TV miniseries, the main characters join up again on the Essex coast, where many small boats are gathering civilians to ferry them out to anchored ships. A Martian Tripod appears and several warships open fire on it with their main batteries. Most of the warships are at quite a distance offshore, but one, which could be Thunder Child, is much closer. The Tripod is hit on one its the legs and in its command cupola, and immediately collapses. A second Martian machine appears on the beach, chasing the protagonists. Before it can activate its Heat-Ray, it is struck by naval artillery shells. It falls forward, narrowly missing crushing the protagonists. As in H.G. Wells’ original novel, the refugees manage to escape, while none of the warships are shown being destroyed by the Tripods.

== See also ==
- List of fictional ships
