= USS Alarm (1873) =

Torpedo boat of the United States Navy

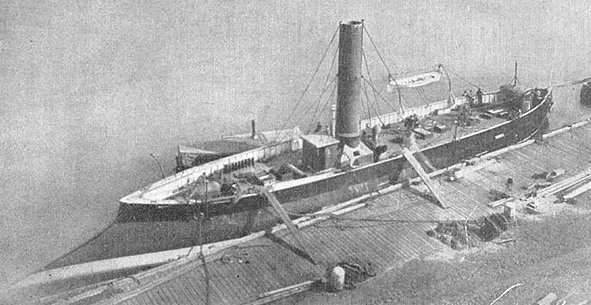
- USS Alarm (1873) halftone reproduction of a photograph taken at the New York Navy Yard, Brooklyn, New York, circa 1876.

History

United States
- Name: Alarm
- Builder: New York Navy Yard
- Launched: 13 November 1873
- Commissioned: 1874
- Decommissioned: 1885
- Stricken: 1897
- Fate: Sold on 23 February 1898.

General characteristics
- Displacement: 800 t
- Length: 158 ft 6 in (48.31 m)
- Beam: 28 ft (8.5 m)
- Draft: 10 ft 6 in (3.20 m)
- Speed: 10 knots (19 km/h; 12 mph)
- Armament: 1 x 15" gun 3 x spar torpedo

USS Alarm was one of two steam-powered torpedo rams (along with USS Intrepid) that were ordered at the behest of Admiral David D. Porter in 1871. Porter, the influential seniormost officer in the U.S. Navy at the time, had been impressed by the potential of the spar torpedo during the American Civil War, and felt that this weapon could play a critical role in harbor and coastal defence as something capable of sinking a monitor, a powerful type of vessel that had nonetheless proven vulnerable below the waterline.

Admiral Porter is said to have taken direct responsibility for the design of Alarm, although detailed design work was done by Isaiah Hanscom, Chief of the Bureau of Construction. She was laid down in 1873 at the New York Navy Yard; was launched on 13 November 1873; and was commissioned into the U.S. Navy on 2 November 1874. The most notable characteristic of the design was its 24-foot-long ram bow, which extended like the toe of a shoe from the front of an otherwise conventional-looking ship.

== Design and Construction ==
The vessel was described in detail in multiple articles published in the Proceedings of the U. S. Naval Institute from 1879 through 2023, the earliest having been written by Lieutenant R.M.G. Brown, who had served at the Newport Torpedo Research Facility from June through October 1874, and had commanded Alarm from June 1878.

At Porter's insistence the vessel was built entirely of iron, on the transverse bracket system, with a double bottom and transverse bulkheads every 20 to 25 feet. The spaces between the two layers of the bottom could be flooded in order to lower the vessel 13 inches farther into the water. The vessel was armored only on the bows (with 4-inch iron) and pilot house. Longitudinal frames were bent inward near their forward ends so as to come together at the bow, to strengthen it for ramming. The keel was doubled back to serve as the upper frame for the ram. The ram itself [was] cut off from the vessel by a watertight compartment, so that should it suffer injury in ramming, and leak, no harm would be done to the vessel proper. Heavy duty pumps were provided so that undamaged watertight compartments could be pumped out quickly. The vessel's greatest defect was its propulsion system: two different types of experimental propeller, the Fowler and Mallory systems, both capable of providing lateral thrust and thereby making the vessel turn at very low forward speeds, were tried, but while successful at making the vessel highly maneuverable, neither system could propel the vessel forward as fast as 10 knots. Installation of the Mallory propeller added significantly to the weight at the stern, increasing draft.

The vessel was armed with one XV-inch (308-mm) Dahlgren smoothbore gun, fixed forward, and Gatling guns along the rails. The casing for a long torpedo spar, which could be run out thirty feet directly ahead of the bow, was incorporated into the ram, and one secondary spar, 17 feet long, made of the best gun metal, projected from each side of the vessel. The spars were hollow steel tubes that were normally kept retracted within the vessel's hull, but which could be extended using auxiliary steam power while at sea. All the spars were completely submerged when extended. The ports through which they projected were provided with a water box with double doors, with heavy rubber washers gripping the spar tightly as it ran in and out. The torpedoes themselves were cylindrical, with conical heads; those used with the main, forward spar were c. 4.5 feet in length and 1 foot in diameter, while those used with the lateral spars were a bit smaller. The torpedoes were mounted on the front ends of the spars, with the spar seated to a depth of about a foot into the rear of the torpedo. The torpedoes were connected to firing controls by ordinary insulated wires, which remained connected after the torpedo was detached from the spar and the vessel began to back away; this allowed detonation to be delayed until the vessel had increased the distance from its target.

== Service History ==
Alarm worked in support of experiments (likely mine-related) being done by the Bureau of Ordnance near Washington, D.C. until 1877. Late in that year she moved north to Newport to conduct further experiments at the torpedo station, but after several months she returned to her duties with Ordnance in Washington. In 1880 she proceeded to the New York Navy Yard, performing additional research of an unknown nature until she was sent to Norfolk in 1883 and laid up. In 1881, William Elbridge Sewell, who would later become Governor of Guam, was placed in command. However, she resumed her research duties at New York in 1884 and served there until she was placed out of commission in 1885 and laid up "in ordinary" at New York.

The records are unclear, but Alarm probably remained out of commission from that time forward. Sometime between 1890 and 1892 she was modified for service as a gunnery training ship, but she was apparently never used as such. From 1892 to 1894, she remained at the New York Navy Yard. In 1897 her name was stricken from the Navy list, and on 23 February 1898 she was sold for scrapping.
