= George C. Maxwell =

American politician (1771–1816)

Member of the U.S. House of Representatives from New Jersey's At-large district
- In office March 4, 1811 – March 3, 1813 Serving with Adam Boyd; Lewis Condict; Jacob Hufty; James Morgan; Thomas Newbold
- Succeeded by: Districts only

United States Attorney for the District of New Jersey
- In office 1801–1803
- President: Thomas Jefferson
- Preceded by: Frederick Frelinghuysen
- Succeeded by: William Sanford Pennington

Personal details
- Born: George Clifford Maxwell; March 16, 1768 Sussex County, New Jersey, British America
- Died: May 26, 1835 (aged 67) Flemington, New Jersey, U.S.
- Party: Democratic-Republican
- Spouse: Rachel Bryan Maxwell
- Education: Princeton University (BA)

George Clifford Maxwell (March 16, 1768 – May 26, 1835) was a U.S. representative from New Jersey, father of John Patterson Bryan Maxwell. Maxwell's nephew George M. Robeson was United States Secretary of the Navy and also sat in Congress.

== Biography ==
Born in Sussex County, New Jersey, Maxwell graduated from Princeton College in 1792. He studied law, was admitted to the bar in 1797 and practiced in Hunterdon County, New Jersey. He was U.S. Attorney for the District of New Jersey from 1801 to 1803.

Maxwell was elected as a Democratic-Republican to the Twelfth Congress (March 4, 1811 – March 3, 1813). He resumed the practice of law in Flemington, New Jersey, where he died on March 16, 1835. He was buried in Pleasant Ridge Cemetery in Raritan Township, New Jersey.

U.S. House of Representatives
| Preceded by John A. Scudder | Member of the U.S. House of Representatives from New Jersey's at-large congressional district 1811–1813 | Succeeded by Benjamin Bennet |
