= John Patterson Bryan Maxwell =

American politician (1804–1845)

Member of the U.S. House of Representatives from New Jersey's at-large district
- In office March 4, 1841 – March 3, 1843
- Preceded by: Joseph Kille
- Succeeded by: District inactive

Member of the U.S. House of Representatives from New Jersey's at-large district
- In office March 4, 1837 – March 3, 1839
- Preceded by: Thomas Lee
- Succeeded by: Joseph Kille

Personal details
- Born: September 3, 1804 Flemington, New Jersey, U.S.
- Died: November 14, 1845 (aged 41) Belvidere, New Jersey, U.S.
- Resting place: Belvidere Cemetery, Belvidere, New Jersey, U.S.
- Party: Whig
- Parent(s): George C. Maxwell; Rachel Bryan Maxwell
- Relatives: George M. Robeson (cousin)
- Education: Princeton College
- Profession: Politician, lawyer

John Patterson Bryan Maxwell (September 3, 1804 – November 14, 1845) was an American lawyer and Whig Party politician who represented New Jersey in the United States House of Representatives from 1837 to 1839 and again from 1841 to 1843.

He was the son of George C. Maxwell and the first cousin of George M. Robeson, both of whom also served in the House of Representatives.

== Early life and career ==
Maxwell was born on September 3, 1804, in Flemington, New Jersey. He graduated from Princeton College in 1823, studied law, was admitted to the bar in 1827 and commenced practice in Newark, New Jersey. He moved to Belvidere, New Jersey, and became editor of the Belvidere Apollo.

== Congress ==
Maxwell was elected as a Whig to the Twenty-fifth Congress, serving from March 4, 1837 – March 3, 1839. He presented credentials as a Member-elect to the Twenty-sixth Congress, but the House declined to seat him. He was elected to the Twenty-seventh Congress, in office from March 4, 1841 – March 3, 1843. He was a trustee of Princeton College from 1842 to 1845.

=== Death and burial ===
Maxwell died in Belvidere on November 14, 1845, and was interred there in Belvidere Cemetery.

== Sources ==
- United States Congress. "John Patterson Bryan Maxwell (id: M000268)". Biographical Directory of the United States Congress.
- John Patterson Bryan Maxwell at The Political Graveyard

U.S. House of Representatives
Preceded by Thomas Lee	Member of the U.S. House of Representatives from New Jersey's at-large congressional district 1837–1839	Succeeded by Joseph Kille
Preceded by Joseph Kille	Member of the U.S. House of Representatives from New Jersey's at-large congressional district 1841–1843	Succeeded by District inactive
