= Benjamin Bennet (politician) =

American politician

Member of the U.S. House of Representatives from New Jersey's At-large district
- In office March 4, 1815 – March 4, 1819
- Preceded by: District established
- Succeeded by: Bernard Smith

Personal details
- Born: October 31, 1764 Bucks County, Province of Pennsylvania, British America
- Died: October 8, 1840 (aged 75) near Middletown, New Jersey, U.S.
- Party: Democratic-Republican
- Occupation: Minister, farmer

Benjamin Bennet (October 31, 1764 – October 8, 1840) was a slave owner and U.S. representative from New Jersey.

Born in Bucks County in the Province of Pennsylvania, Bennet attended the common schools. He studied theology, was ordained as a minister in Middletown Township, New Jersey in 1793, and served as pastor of a Baptist church in that city. He also engaged in agricultural pursuits.

Bennet was elected as a Democratic-Republican to the Fourteenth and Fifteenth Congresses (March 4, 1815 – March 3, 1819). After his time in office, he resumed agricultural pursuits. He died on his farm near Middletown Township on October 8, 1840, and was interred in the Baptist Cemetery, Holmdel Township, New Jersey.

U.S. House of Representatives
Preceded by George C. Maxwell	Member of the U.S. House of Representatives from New Jersey's at-large congressional district 1815–1819	Succeeded by Bernard Smith
