= Torpedo ram =

19th century offensive naval design attribute

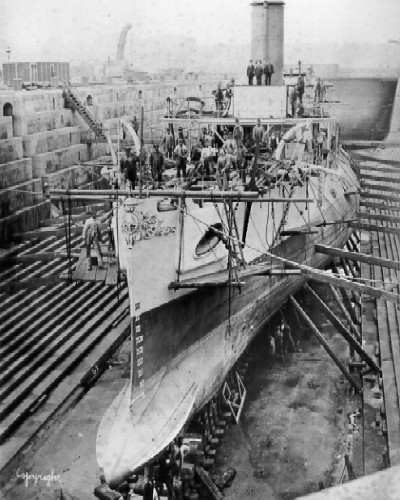
The torpedo ram HMS Polyphemus

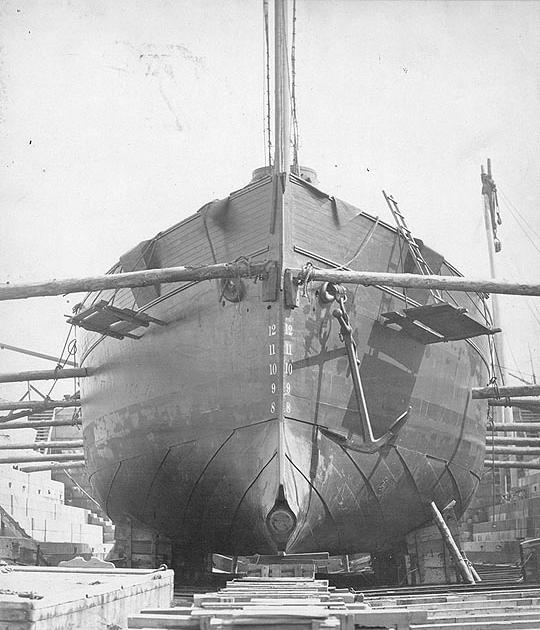
The 1874 USS Intrepid in dry dock, note the torpedo projection device at her forefoot

A torpedo ram is a type of torpedo boat combining a ram with torpedo tubes. Incorporating design elements from the cruiser and the monitor, it was intended to provide small and inexpensive weapon systems for coastal defence and other littoral combat.

== Overview ==
Like a monitor, torpedo rams operated with very little freeboard, sometimes with only inches of hull rising above the water, exposing only their funnels and turrets to enemy fire. In addition to the guns in their turrets, they also were equipped with torpedoes. Early designs incorporated a spar torpedo that could be extended from the bow and detonated by ramming a target. Later designs used tube-launched self-propelled torpedoes, but retained the concept of ramming, resulting in designs like HMS Polyphemus, which had five torpedo tubes, two each port and starboard and one mounted in the center of her reinforced ram bow.

The torpedo ram concept came about at a time when the self-propelled torpedo, pioneered by Robert Whitehead, had only just been invented. The earliest self-propelled torpedoes were obviously very powerful weapons, but were very short-ranged and incapable of reaching speeds greater than 10 knots, making them useless against anything but stationary targets. Another result of this was that for a time there was much confusion in naval circles about how best to employ the torpedo. During the 1870s a large number of proposals emerged for torpedo-carrying warships.

The torpedo ram, like most of the early torpedo-carrying warship designs, was intended to attack enemy warships while they were still at anchor in harbor. The torpedo ram's low profile and high speed were to make discovery and interception harder, as was the commonly stated intent for their attacks to take place at night. Once it reached the harbor, the torpedo ram was to smash its way through any seaward harbor defenses and make straight for the ships lying at anchor, launching its torpedoes before they could get underway. Once this was done, the torpedo ram would exit the harbor and make a high-speed escape to waiting friendly forces.

== Abandonment and legacy ==
It soon became clear that the proposition of attacking enemy ships in harbors was not a practical one. Because of this, torpedo rams were never particularly popular, and the design was largely abandoned by the end of the 19th century as other, more practical, classes of torpedo-carrying warships emerged. Only a handful were built. The best remembered examples of the type were the aforementioned Polyphemus and the United States Navy's USS Intrepid. Neither saw a great deal of active service and they were mostly used for torpedo trials, although Polyphemus did demonstrate the potential damage she could inflict when she was used to demolish a harbor defense boom via ramming.

While never popular with the naval services that created them, the torpedo ram can be said to have caught public attention in a manner which far exceeded its utility as a concept for a fighting ship. The heroic HMS Thunder Child in H. G. Wells' science fiction novel The War of the Worlds is a torpedo ram; she destroys two Martian Tripods before being sunk.

== See also ==
- Torpedo tube
- Torpedo destroyer
