= USS Borie =

USS Borie may refer to:

- USS Borie (DD-215), a Clemson-class destroyer commissioned in 1920, served in World War II and sunk following battle damage in 1943.
- USS Borie (DD-704), an Allen M. Sumner-class destroyer, commissioned in 1944 and decommissioned in 1972.
