= USS Intrepid (1874) =

Torpedo boat of the United States Navy

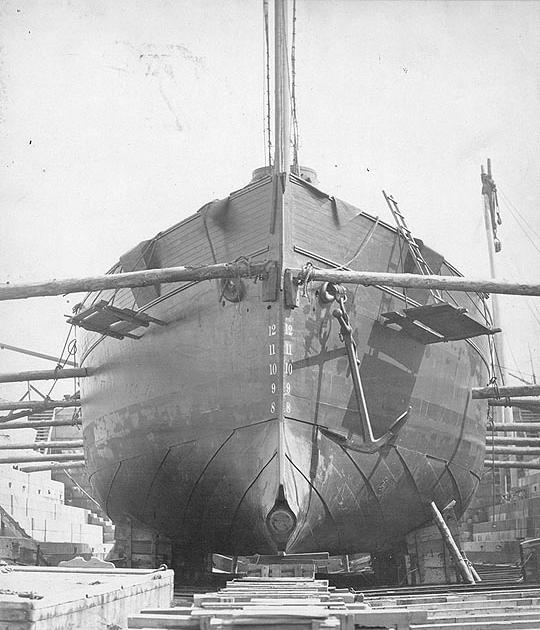
- USS Intrepid in dry dock, note the torpedo projection device at her forefoot

History

United States
- Name: USS Intrepid
- Builder: Boston Navy Yard
- Launched: 5 March 1874
- Commissioned: 31 July 1874
- Decommissioned: 22 August 1882
- Stricken: 9 May 1892
- Fate: Sold for scrap, 9 May 1892

General characteristics
- Type: Torpedo ram
- Displacement: 1,150 long tons (1,168 t)
- Length: 170 ft 3 in (51.89 m)
- Beam: 35 ft (11 m)
- Draft: 12 ft (3.7 m)
- Propulsion: Steam screw
- Speed: 11 knots (20 km/h; 13 mph)
- Armament: 4 × 24-pounder howitzers; 1 × torpedo tube

The second USS Intrepid was one of two steam-powered torpedo rams (along with USS Alarm) that were ordered at the behest of Admiral David D. Porter in 1871. Porter, the influential seniormost officer in the U.S. Navy at the time, had been impressed by the potential of the spar torpedo during the American Civil War, and felt that this weapon could play a critical role in harbor and coastal defence as something capable of sinking a monitor, a powerful type of vessel that had nonetheless proven vulnerable below the waterline. Although a number of seemingly credible sources suggest that Intrepid was equipped with self-propelled torpedoes, many of these sources cite as their own source (or copy nearly verbatim) the Dictionary of American Naval Fighting Ships, which in fact makes no mention of self-propelled torpedoes, while other sources explicitly state that Intrepid was strictly a spar-torpedo vessel.

The ship appears to have spent all but a few months of her career docked at the New York Navy Yard, being decommissioned in 1882. An attempt to convert the vessel into a gunboat was halted in 1889, when surveyors determined that she was beyond economical repair. She was ultimately stricken and sold for scrap in 1892.

== Construction ==
Intrepid was designed by Isaiah Hanscom, Chief Constructor of the U.S. Navy. Engines for the vessel were ordered from the Morgan Iron Works, in lower Manhattan, on 23 December 1871. Sponsored by Miss H. Evelyn Frothingham Pooke, Intrepid's keel was laid down at the Charlestown Navy Yard in Boston in 1873; she was launched on 5 March 1874; and she was commissioned into the U.S. Navy on 31 July of the same year. Her first commanding officer was Commander Augustus P. Cooke.

== Service ==
Intrepid was a largely experimental vessel of little true value as an actual fighting ship. After her commissioning ceremony, she departed Boston on 3 August 1874 for the torpedo research station at Newport, Rhode Island. Since she was a new and untried design, Intrepid remained in coastal waters for the majority of the voyage, and took until August 4 to arrive in Newport. Then, after a little less than a month, she was reassigned again, leaving Newport on 31 August and arriving at the New York Navy Yard on 1 September. The following two months were devoted to torpedo trials along the North Atlantic Coast, which showed that Intrepid's design was generally unsatisfactory. This trial cruise ended when she returned to New York on 24 October, and she was decommissioned a week later, on 30 October.

Intrepid remained out of service at New York for the remainder of 1874 and the first half of 1875 before being recommissioned on 28 August. Even though she would remain in commission for the remainder of the decade, with the exception of brief visits to various New England ports in 1875 and 1876, she generally remained at the New York Navy Yard.

Despite her unsatisfactory and experimental nature, the financially starved Navy Department looked for ways to utilize her to some good purpose, since money and congressional support for new warships was almost non-existent during this period. The Navy eventually decided to convert Intrepid into a light-draft gunboat for service in Chinese waters. As a result, she was decommissioned on 22 August 1882 and moved to the shipyard at the New York Navy Yard for conversion. The work proceeded slowly and was suspended altogether in 1889. Years of inactivity had taken their toll on the ship, and a survey undertaken in early 1892 found that she had become unserviceable. Since the funding needed to restore Intrepid would be far more than could be possibly be justified by her future value as a gunboat, it was decided to dispose of her. Intrepid was stricken from the Navy List, and on 9 May 1892 she was sold to a certain Mathew Gill, Jr., of Philadelphia. She was probably broken up soon afterwards.
