= 1824 United States House of Representatives election in New Jersey =

New Jersey elected six members of the United States House of Representatives on November 2, 1824, as part of the 1824–25 United States House of Representatives elections.

District	Incumbent			This race	
District	Member	Party	First elected	Results	Candidates
New Jersey at-large 6 seats on a general ticket	Lewis Condict	Jackson Democratic-Republican	1820	Incumbent re-elected as Anti-Jacksonian.	√ George Holcombe (Jacksonian) 16.8%; √ Samuel Swan (Anti-Jacksonian) 16.8%; √ Lewis Condict (Anti-Jacksonian) 16.8%; √ Daniel Garrison (Jacksonian) 16.7%; √ George Cassedy (Jacksonian)16.7%; √ Ebenezer Tucker (Anti-Jacksonian) 16.2%
New Jersey at-large 6 seats on a general ticket	George Holcombe	Jackson Democratic-Republican	1820	Incumbent re-elected as Jacksonian.	√ George Holcombe (Jacksonian) 16.8%; √ Samuel Swan (Anti-Jacksonian) 16.8%; √ Lewis Condict (Anti-Jacksonian) 16.8%; √ Daniel Garrison (Jacksonian) 16.7%; √ George Cassedy (Jacksonian)16.7%; √ Ebenezer Tucker (Anti-Jacksonian) 16.2%
New Jersey at-large 6 seats on a general ticket	George Cassedy	Jackson Democratic-Republican	1820	Incumbent re-elected as Jacksonian.	√ George Holcombe (Jacksonian) 16.8%; √ Samuel Swan (Anti-Jacksonian) 16.8%; √ Lewis Condict (Anti-Jacksonian) 16.8%; √ Daniel Garrison (Jacksonian) 16.7%; √ George Cassedy (Jacksonian)16.7%; √ Ebenezer Tucker (Anti-Jacksonian) 16.2%
New Jersey at-large 6 seats on a general ticket	Daniel Garrison	Jackson Democratic-Republican	1822	Incumbent re-elected as Jacksonian.	√ George Holcombe (Jacksonian) 16.8%; √ Samuel Swan (Anti-Jacksonian) 16.8%; √ Lewis Condict (Anti-Jacksonian) 16.8%; √ Daniel Garrison (Jacksonian) 16.7%; √ George Cassedy (Jacksonian)16.7%; √ Ebenezer Tucker (Anti-Jacksonian) 16.2%
New Jersey at-large 6 seats on a general ticket	Samuel Swan	Jackson Democratic-Republican	1820	Incumbent re-elected as Anti-Jacksonian.	√ George Holcombe (Jacksonian) 16.8%; √ Samuel Swan (Anti-Jacksonian) 16.8%; √ Lewis Condict (Anti-Jacksonian) 16.8%; √ Daniel Garrison (Jacksonian) 16.7%; √ George Cassedy (Jacksonian)16.7%; √ Ebenezer Tucker (Anti-Jacksonian) 16.2%
New Jersey at-large 6 seats on a general ticket	James Matlack	Adams-Clay Democratic-Republican	1820	Incumbent retired. New member elected. Anti-Jacksonian gain.	√ George Holcombe (Jacksonian) 16.8%; √ Samuel Swan (Anti-Jacksonian) 16.8%; √ Lewis Condict (Anti-Jacksonian) 16.8%; √ Daniel Garrison (Jacksonian) 16.7%; √ George Cassedy (Jacksonian)16.7%; √ Ebenezer Tucker (Anti-Jacksonian) 16.2%

== See also ==
- 1824 and 1825 United States House of Representatives elections
- List of United States representatives from New Jersey
