= 1828 New Jersey's at-large congressional district special election =

A special election was held in New Jersey's at-large congressional district to fill two vacancies caused by the deaths of George Holcombe (J) on January 14, 1828, and Hedge Thompson (A) on July 23, 1828. The elections were held at the same time as the election for the 21st Congress.

== Election results ==
Candidate	Party	Votes	Percent
Thomas Sinnickson	Anti-Jacksonian	23,425	26.0%
James F. Randolph	Anti-Jacksonian	23,387	25.9%
James Parker	Jacksonian	21,757	24.1%
James Westcott	Jacksonian	21,577	23.9%

Sinnickson and Randolph took their seats on December 1, 1828. Randolph was also elected to the 21st Congress.

== See also ==
- List of special elections to the United States House of Representatives
