= 19th United States Congress =

1825–1827 U.S. Congress

←	18th	20th	→
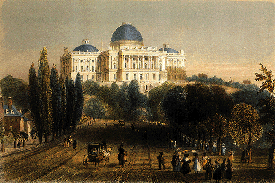
- United States Capitol (1827)

Overview
- Legislative body: United States Congress
- Jurisdiction: United States
- Term: March 4, 1825 – March 4, 1827

Senate
- Members: 48
- President: John C. Calhoun (DR)
- President pro tempore: John Gaillard (DR); Nathaniel Macon (DR)
- Party control: Jackson Men

House of Representatives
- Members: 213 representatives 3 non-voting delegates
- Speaker: John W. Taylor (NR)
- Party control: Anti-Jackson

Sessions
- Special (Note: Special session of the Senate.): March 4, 1825 – March 9, 1825
- 1st: December 5, 1825 – May 22, 1826
- 2nd: December 4, 1826 – March 3, 1827

The 19th United States Congress was a meeting of the legislative branch of the United States federal government, consisting of the United States Senate and the United States House of Representatives. It met in Washington, D.C. from March 4, 1825, to March 4, 1827, during the first two years of John Quincy Adams's presidency. The apportionment of seats in the House of Representatives was based on the 1820 United States census. The Senate had a majority of Jackson Men, while the House had an Anti-Jackson (pro-Adams) majority.

== Major events ==
- March 4, 1825: John Quincy Adams inaugurated as President of the United States
- October 26, 1825: The Erie Canal opened, providing passage from Albany, New York, to Buffalo and Lake Erie.
- July 4, 1826: Both Thomas Jefferson and John Adams died on the 50th Anniversary of America's Independence

== Major legislation ==
- [data missing]
- Atlantic–Gulf of Mexico Canal Survey Act (1826)
- School Lands Act of 1826

== Treaties signed ==
- November 7, 1825: Treaty of St. Louis: 1,400 Missouri Shawnees were forcibly relocated from Missouri to Kansas
- January 24, 1826: Treaty of Washington between the United States government and the Creek National Council, in which they ceded much of their land in Georgia

== Party summary ==
The count below identifies party affiliations at the beginning of the first session of this congress. Changes resulting from subsequent replacements are shown below in the "Changes in membership" section.

=== Senate ===
Senate membership

Beginning of the Congress

End of the Congress

	Party (shading shows control)			Total	Vacant
	Anti- Jacksonian (A)	Jacksonian (J)	Other	Total	Vacant
End of previous congress	16 (Note: Adams & Clay factions)	12 (Note: Jackson faction)	20 (Note: Crawford faction)	48	0
Begin	20	25	0	45	3
End	22	26	0	48	0
Final voting share	45.8%	54.2%	0.0%		
Beginning of next congress	20	27	1	48	0

=== House of Representatives ===
House membership

Beginning of the Congress

End of the Congress

	Party (shading shows control)			Total	Vacant
	Anti- Jacksonian (A)	Jacksonian (J)	Other	Total	Vacant
End of previous congress	87 (Note: Adams & Clay factions)	71 (Note: Jackson faction)	55 (Note: Crawford faction)	213	0
Begin	107	106	0	213	0
End	109	104	0	213	0
Final voting share	51.2%	48.8%	0.0%		
Beginning of next congress	102	110	0	212	1

== Leadership ==
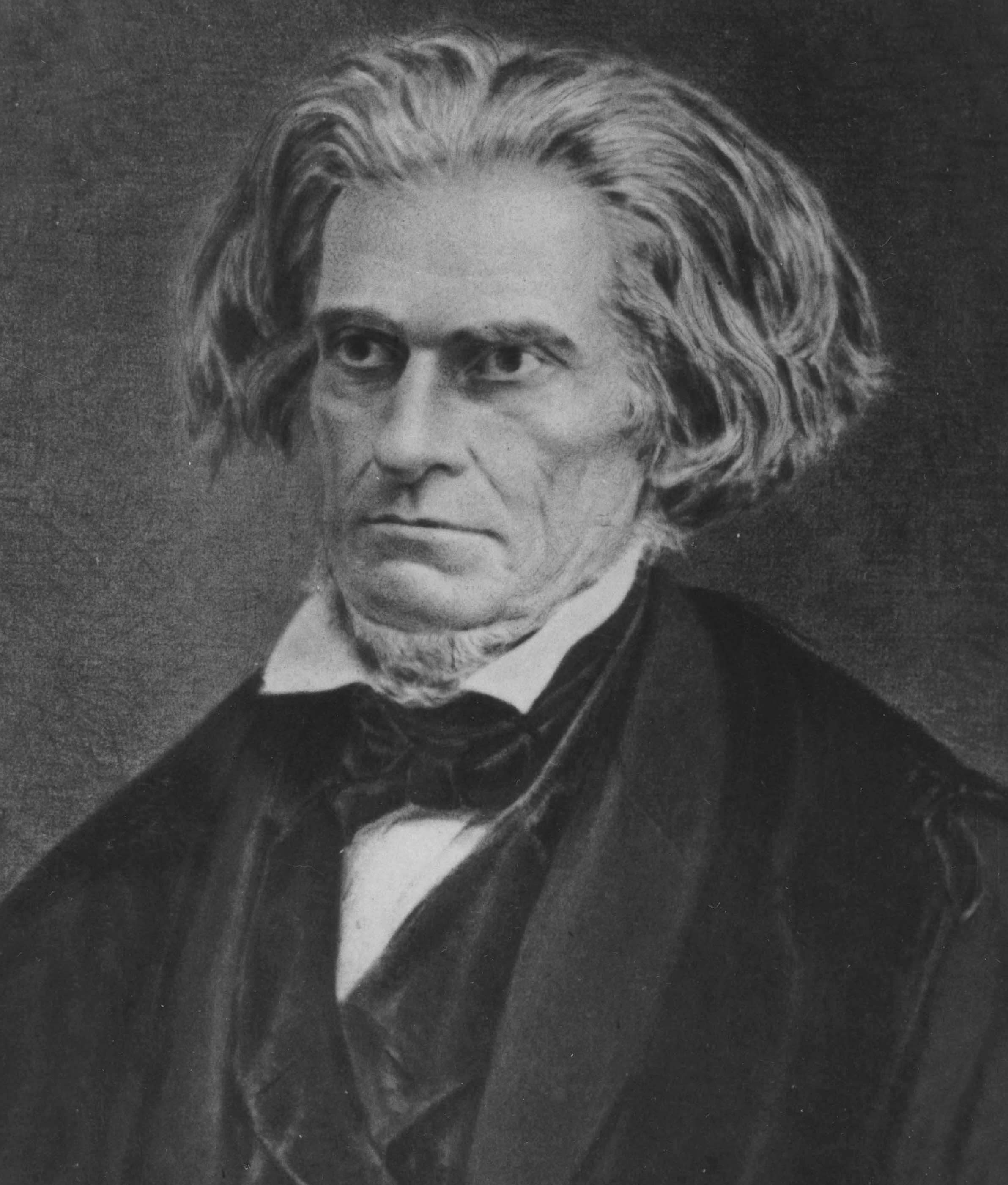
President of the Senate
John C. Calhoun

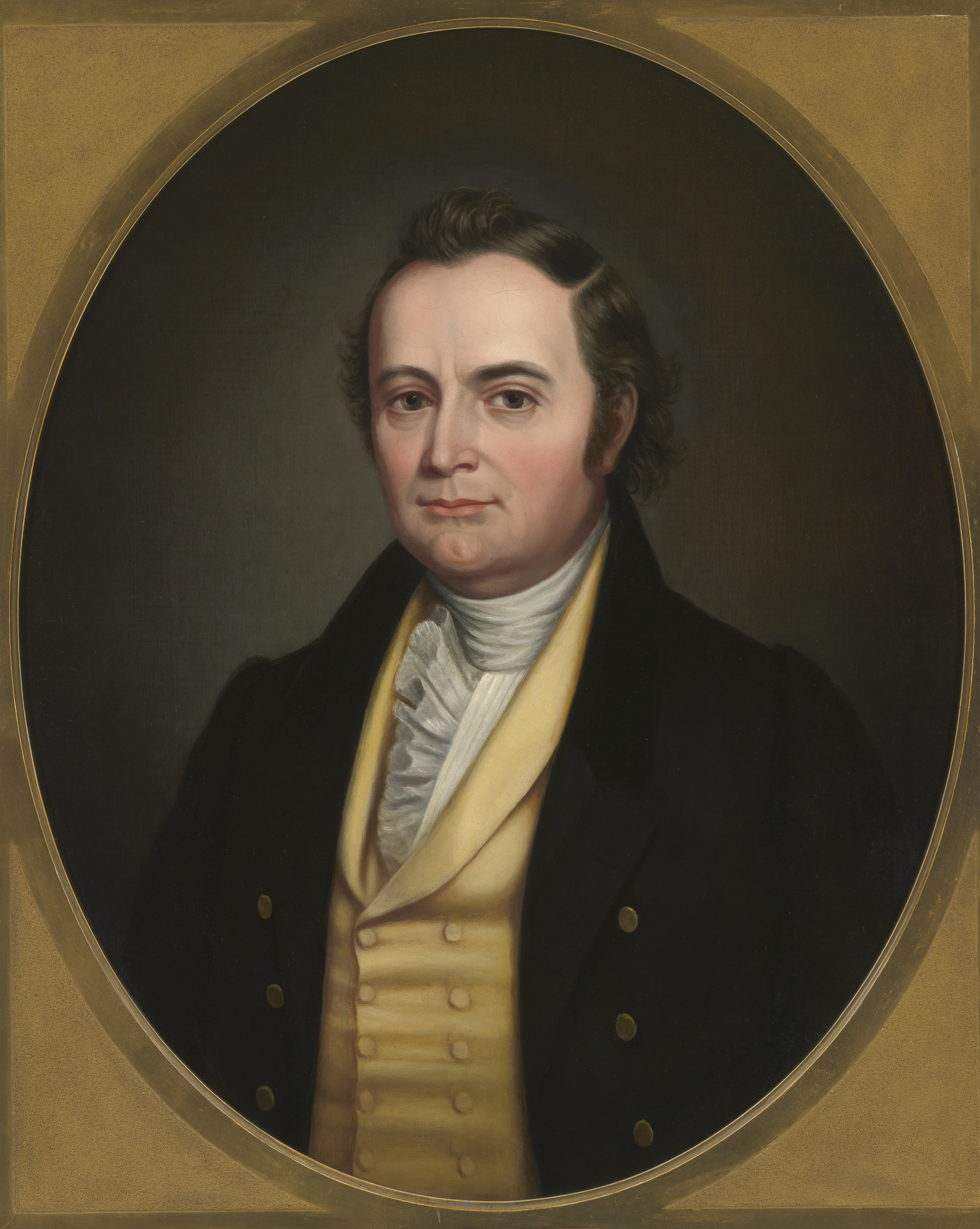
Speaker of the House
John W. Taylor

=== Senate ===
- President: John C. Calhoun (J)
- President pro tempore: John Gaillard (J), until December 4, 1825
  - Nathaniel Macon (J), from May 20, 1826

=== House of Representatives ===
- Speaker: John W. Taylor (A)

== Members ==
This list is arranged by chamber, then by state. Senators are listed by class and representatives are listed by district.

(J) following a name means the member was of the Jackson faction. (A) that the person was a member of the Adams (anti-Jackson) faction.

Skip to House of Representatives, below

=== Senate ===
Senators were elected by the state legislatures every two years, with one-third beginning new six-year terms with each Congress. Preceding the names in the list below are Senate class numbers, which indicate the cycle of their election. In this Congress, Class 1 meant their term ended with this Congress, facing re-election in 1826/1827; Class 2 meant their term began in the last Congress, facing re-election in 1828/1829; and Class 3 meant their term began in this Congress, facing re-election in 1830/1831.

==== Alabama ====
▌2. William R. D. King (J)
▌3. Henry H. Chambers (J), until January 24, 1826

▌Israel Pickens (J), February 17, 1826 – November 27, 1826
▌John McKinley (J), from November 27, 1826

==== Connecticut ====
▌1. Henry W. Edwards (J)
▌3. Calvin Willey (A), from May 4, 1825

==== Delaware ====
▌1. Thomas Clayton (A)
▌2. Nicholas Van Dyke (A), until May 21, 1826

▌Daniel Rodney (A), November 8, 1826 – January 12, 1827
▌Henry M. Ridgely (J), from January 23, 1827

==== Georgia ====
▌2. Thomas W. Cobb (J)
▌3. John Macpherson Berrien (J)

==== Illinois ====
▌2. Jesse B. Thomas (A)
▌3. Elias K. Kane (J)

==== Indiana ====
▌1. James Noble (A)
▌3. William Hendricks (A)

==== Kentucky ====
▌2. Richard M. Johnson (J)
▌3. John Rowan (J)

==== Louisiana ====
▌2. Dominique J. Bouligny (A)
▌3. Josiah S. Johnston (A)

==== Maine ====
▌1. John Holmes (A)
▌2. John Chandler (J)

==== Maryland ====
▌1. Samuel Smith (J)
▌3. Edward Lloyd (J), until January 14, 1826

▌Ezekiel F. Chambers (A), from January 24, 1826

==== Massachusetts ====
▌1. Elijah H. Mills (A)
▌2. James Lloyd (A), until May 23, 1826

▌Nathaniel Silsbee (A), from May 31, 1826

==== Mississippi ====
▌1. David Holmes (J), until September 25, 1825

▌Powhatan Ellis (J), September 28, 1825 – January 28, 1826
▌Thomas B. Reed (J), from January 28, 1826

▌2. Thomas H. Williams (J)

==== Missouri ====
▌1. Thomas H. Benton (J)
▌3. David Barton (A)

==== New Hampshire ====
▌2. Samuel Bell (A)
▌3. Levi Woodbury (J), from March 16, 1825

==== New Jersey ====
▌1. Joseph McIlvaine (A), until August 19, 1826

▌Ephraim Bateman (A), from November 10, 1826

▌2. Mahlon Dickerson (J)

==== New York ====
▌1. Martin Van Buren (J)
▌3. Nathan Sanford (A), from January 14, 1826

==== North Carolina ====
▌2. John Branch (J)
▌3. Nathaniel Macon (J)

==== Ohio ====
▌1. Benjamin Ruggles (A)
▌3. William Henry Harrison (A)

==== Pennsylvania ====
▌1. William Findlay (J)
▌3. William Marks (A)

==== Rhode Island ====
▌1. James DeWolf (A), until October 31, 1825

▌Asher Robbins (A), from October 31, 1825

▌2. Nehemiah R. Knight (A)

==== South Carolina ====
▌2. Robert Y. Hayne (J)
▌3. John Gaillard (J), until February 26, 1826

▌William Harper (J), March 8, 1826 – November 29, 1826
▌William Smith (J), from November 29, 1826

==== Tennessee ====
▌1. John H. Eaton (J)
▌2. Andrew Jackson (J), until October 14, 1825

▌Hugh Lawson White (J), from October 28, 1825

==== Vermont ====
▌1. Horatio Seymour (A)
▌3. Dudley Chase (A)

==== Virginia ====
▌1. James Barbour (J), until March 7, 1825

▌John Randolph (J), from December 26, 1825

▌2. Littleton W. Tazewell (J)

Senators' party membership by state at the opening of the 19th Congress in March 1825. 2 Jacksonians 1 Jacksonian and 1 Anti-Jacksonian 2 Anti-Jacksonians

=== House of Representatives ===
==== Alabama ====
▌1. Gabriel Moore (J)
▌2. John McKee (J)
▌3. George W. Owen (J)

==== Connecticut ====
All representatives were elected statewide on a general ticket.

▌At-large. John Baldwin (A)
▌At-large. Noyes Barber (A)
▌At-large. Ralph I. Ingersoll (A)
▌At-large. Orange Merwin (A)
▌At-large. Elisha Phelps (A)
▌At-large. Gideon Tomlinson (A)

==== Delaware ====
▌At-large. Louis McLane (J)

==== Georgia ====
All representatives were elected statewide on a general ticket.

▌At-large. George Cary (J)
▌At-large. Alfred Cuthbert (J)
▌At-large. John Forsyth (J)
▌At-large. Charles E. Haynes (J)
▌At-large. James Meriwether (J)
▌At-large. Edward F. Tattnall (J)
▌At-large. Wiley Thompson (J)

==== Illinois ====
▌At-large. Daniel P. Cook (A)

==== Indiana ====
▌1. Ratliff Boon (J)
▌2. Jonathan Jennings (A)
▌3. John Test (A)

==== Kentucky ====
▌1. David Trimble (A)
▌2. Thomas Metcalfe (A)
▌3. Henry Clay (A), until March 6, 1825

▌James Clark (A), from August 1, 1825

▌4. Robert P. Letcher (A)
▌5. James Johnson (J), until August 13, 1826

▌Robert L. McHatton (J), from December 7, 1826

▌6. Joseph Lecompte (J)
▌7. Thomas P. Moore (J)
▌8. Richard A. Buckner (A)
▌9. Charles A. Wickliffe (J)
▌10. Francis Johnson (A)
▌11. William S. Young (A)
▌12. Robert P. Henry (J), until August 25, 1826

▌John F. Henry (A), from December 11, 1826

==== Louisiana ====
▌1. Edward Livingston (J)
▌2. Henry H. Gurley (A)
▌3. William L. Brent (A)

==== Maine ====
▌1. William Burleigh (A)
▌2. John Anderson (J)
▌3. Ebenezer Herrick (A)
▌4. Peleg Sprague (A)
▌5. Enoch Lincoln (A), until 1826 (before September 11, 1826, [data missing])

▌James W. Ripley (J), from September 11, 1826

▌6. Jeremiah O'Brien (A)
▌7. David Kidder (A)

==== Maryland ====
The 5th district was a plural district with two representatives.

▌1. Clement Dorsey (A)
▌2. Joseph Kent (A), until January 6, 1826

▌John C. Weems (J), from February 1, 1826

▌3. George Peter (J)
▌4. Thomas C. Worthington (A)
▌5. John Barney (A)
▌5. Peter Little (A)
▌6. George E. Mitchell (J)
▌7. John L. Kerr (A)
▌8. Robert N. Martin (A)

==== Massachusetts ====
▌1. Daniel Webster (A)
▌2. Benjamin W. Crowninshield (A)
▌3. John Varnum (A)
▌4. Edward Everett (A)
▌5. John Davis (A)
▌6. John Locke (A)
▌7. Samuel C. Allen (A)
▌8. Samuel Lathrop (A)
▌9. Henry W. Dwight (A)
▌10. John Bailey (A)
▌11. Aaron Hobart (A)
▌12. Francis Baylies (J)
▌13. John Reed Jr. (A)

==== Mississippi ====
▌At-large. Christopher Rankin (J), until March 14, 1826

▌William Haile (J), from July 10, 1826

==== Missouri ====
▌At-large. John Scott (A)

==== New Hampshire ====
All representatives were elected statewide on a general ticket.

▌At-large. Ichabod Bartlett (A)
▌At-large. Titus Brown (A)
▌At-large. Nehemiah Eastman (A)
▌At-large. Jonathan Harvey (J)
▌At-large. Joseph Healy (A)
▌At-large. Thomas Whipple Jr. (A)

==== New Jersey ====
All representatives were elected statewide on a general ticket.

▌At-large. George Cassedy (J)
▌At-large. Lewis Condict (A)
▌At-large. Daniel Garrison (J)
▌At-large. George Holcombe (J)
▌At-large. Samuel Swan (A)
▌At-large. Ebenezer Tucker (A)

==== New York ====
There were three plural districts: the 20th & 26th had two representatives each, the 3rd had three representatives.

▌1. Silas Wood (A)
▌2. Joshua Sands (A)
▌3. Churchill C. Cambreleng (J)
▌3. Jeromus Johnson (J)
▌3. Gulian C. Verplanck (J)
▌4. Aaron Ward (A)
▌5. Bartow White (A)
▌6. John Hallock Jr. (J)
▌7. Abraham B. Hasbrouck (A)
▌8. James Strong (A)
▌9. William McManus (A)
▌10. Stephen Van Rensselaer (A)
▌11. Henry Ashley (J)
▌12. William Dietz (J)
▌13. William G. Angel (J)
▌14. Henry R. Storrs (A)
▌15. Michael Hoffman (J)
▌16. Henry Markell (A)
▌17. John W. Taylor (A)
▌18. Henry C. Martindale (A)
▌19. Henry H. Ross (A)
▌20. Nicoll Fosdick (A)
▌20. Egbert Ten Eyck (J), until December 15, 1825

▌Daniel Hugunin Jr. (A), from December 15, 1825

▌21. Elias Whitmore (A)
▌22. John Miller (A)
▌23. Luther Badger (A)
▌24. Charles Kellogg (J)
▌25. Charles Humphrey (A)
▌26. Dudley Marvin (A)
▌26. Robert S. Rose (A)
▌27. Moses Hayden (A)
▌28. Timothy H. Porter (A)
▌29. Parmenio Adams (A)
▌30. Daniel G. Garnsey (A)

==== North Carolina ====
▌1. Lemuel Sawyer (J)
▌2. Willis Alston (J)
▌3. Richard Hines (J)
▌4. John Heritage Bryan (J)
▌5. Gabriel Holmes (J)
▌6. Weldon N. Edwards (J)
▌7. Archibald McNeill (J)
▌8. Willie P. Mangum (J), until March 18, 1826

▌Daniel L. Barringer (J), from December 4, 1826

▌9. Romulus M. Saunders (J)
▌10. John Long (A)
▌11. Henry W. Connor (J)
▌12. Samuel P. Carson (J)
▌13. Lewis Williams (A)

==== Ohio ====
▌1. James Findlay (J)
▌2. John Woods (A)
▌3. William McLean (A)
▌4. Joseph Vance (A)
▌5. John W. Campbell (A)
▌6. John Thomson (J)
▌7. Samuel F. Vinton (A)
▌8. William Wilson (A)
▌9. Philemon Beecher (A)
▌10. David Jennings (A), until May 25, 1826

▌Thomas Shannon (A), from December 4, 1826

▌11. John C. Wright (A)
▌12. John Sloane (A)
▌13. Elisha Whittlesey (A)
▌14. Mordecai Bartley (A)

==== Pennsylvania ====
There were six plural districts: the 7th, 8th, 11th & 16th had two representatives each, the 4th & 9th had three representatives each.

▌1. John Wurts (J)
▌2. Joseph Hemphill (J), until 1826 (before October 10, 1826 — [data missing])

▌Thomas Kittera (A), from October 10, 1826

▌3. Daniel H. Miller (J)
▌4. James Buchanan (J)
▌4. Samuel Edwards (J)
▌4. Charles Miner (A)
▌5. Philip S. Markley (A)
▌6. Robert Harris (J)
▌7. William Addams (J)
▌7. Henry Wilson (J), until August 14, 1826

▌Jacob Krebs (J), from December 4, 1826

▌8. Samuel D. Ingham (J)
▌8. George Wolf (J)
▌9. George Kremer (J)
▌9. Samuel McKean (J)
▌9. Espy Van Horne (J)
▌10. James S. Mitchell (J)
▌11. John Findlay (J)
▌11. James Wilson (A)
▌12. John Mitchell (J)
▌13. Alexander Thomson (J), until May 1, 1826

▌Chauncey Forward (J), from December 4, 1826

▌14. Andrew Stewart (J)
▌15. Joseph Lawrence (A)
▌16. James Allison Jr. (J), until August 26, 1825 (before the assembling of Congress)

▌Robert Orr Jr. (J), from October 11, 1825

▌16. James S. Stevenson (J)
▌17. George Plumer (J)
▌18. Patrick Farrelly (J), until January 12, 1826

▌Thomas H. Sill (A), from March 14, 1826

==== Rhode Island ====
Both representatives were elected statewide on a general ticket.

▌At-large. Tristam Burges (A)
▌At-large. Dutee J. Pearce (A)

==== South Carolina ====
▌1. Joel R. Poinsett (J), until March 7, 1825

▌William Drayton (J), from May 17, 1825

▌2. James Hamilton Jr. (J)
▌3. Thomas R. Mitchell (J)
▌4. Andrew R. Govan (J)
▌5. George McDuffie (J)
▌6. John Wilson (J)
▌7. Joseph Gist (J)
▌8. John Carter (J)
▌9. Starling Tucker (J)

==== Tennessee ====
▌1. John Blair (J)
▌2. John Cocke (J)
▌3. James C. Mitchell (J)
▌4. Jacob C. Isacks (J)
▌5. Robert Allen (J)
▌6. James K. Polk (J)
▌7. Samuel Houston (J)
▌8. John H. Marable (J)
▌9. Adam R. Alexander (J)

==== Vermont ====
▌1. William C. Bradley (A)
▌2. Rollin C. Mallary (A)
▌3. George E. Wales (A)
▌4. Ezra Meech (J)
▌5. John Mattocks (A)

==== Virginia ====
▌1. Thomas Newton Jr. (A)
▌2. James Trezvant (J)
▌3. William S. Archer (J)
▌4. Mark Alexander (J)
▌5. John Randolph (J), until December 26, 1825

▌George W. Crump (J), from January 21, 1826

▌6. Thomas Davenport (J)
▌7. Nathaniel H. Claiborne (J)
▌8. Burwell Bassett (J)
▌9. Andrew Stevenson (J)
▌10. William C. Rives (J)
▌11. Robert Taylor (A)
▌12. Robert S. Garnett (J)
▌13. John Taliaferro (A)
▌14. Charles F. Mercer (A)
▌15. John S. Barbour (J)
▌16. William Armstrong (A)
▌17. Alfred H. Powell (A)
▌18. Joseph Johnson (J)
▌19. William McCoy (J)
▌20. John Floyd (J)
▌21. William Smith (J)
▌22. Benjamin Estil (A)

==== Non-voting members ====
Arkansas Territory. Henry W. Conway
Florida Territory. Joseph M. White
Michigan Territory. Austin E. Wing

== Changes in membership ==
This count reflects changes from the beginning of the first session of this Congress.

=== Senate ===
- Replacements: 7
  - Anti-Jacksonian (A): 3-seat net gain
  - Jacksonian (J): no net change
- Deaths: 4
- Resignations: 6
- Interim appointments: 4
- Total seats with changes: 13

Senate changes
State (class)	Vacated by	Reason for change	Successor	Date of successor's formal installation (Note: When seated or oath administered, not necessarily when service began.)
New Hampshire (3)	Vacant	Seat remained vacant	Levi Woodbury (J)	Installed March 16, 1825
Connecticut (3)	Vacant	Seat remained vacant	Calvin Willey (A)	Installed May 4, 1825
New York (3)	Vacant	Seat remained vacant	Nathan Sanford (A)	Installed January 14, 1826, after resigning as Chancellor of New York
Virginia (1)	James Barbour (J)	Resigned March 7, 1825, after being appointed US Secretary of War	John Randolph (J)	Appointed December 26, 1825
Mississippi (1)	David Holmes (J)	Resigned September 25, 1825, after being elected Governor of Mississippi	Powhatan Ellis (J)	Appointed September 28, 1825
Tennessee (2)	Andrew Jackson (J)	Resigned October 14, 1825	Hugh Lawson White (J)	Installed October 28, 1825
Rhode Island (1)	James De Wolf (A)	Resigned October 31, 1825	Asher Robbins (A)	Appointed October 31, 1825
Maryland (3)	Edward Lloyd (J)	Resigned January 14, 1826, after being elected to the Maryland State Senate	Ezekiel F. Chambers (A)	Elected January 24, 1826
Alabama (3)	Henry H. Chambers (J)	Died January 24, 1826	Israel Pickens (J)	Appointed February 17, 1826
Mississippi (1)	Powhatan Ellis (J)	Successor elected January 28, 1826	Thomas B. Reed (J)	Installed January 28, 1826
South Carolina (3)	John Gaillard (J)	Died February 26, 1826	William Harper (J)	Appointed March 8, 1826
Delaware (2)	Nicholas Van Dyke (A)	Died May 21, 1826	Daniel Rodney (A)	Appointed November 8, 1826
Massachusetts (2)	James Lloyd (A)	Resigned May 23, 1826	Nathaniel Silsbee (A)	Installed May 31, 1826
New Jersey (1)	Joseph McIlvaine (A)	Died August 19, 1826	Ephraim Bateman(A)	Installed November 10, 1826
Alabama (3)	Israel Pickens (J)	Successor elected November 27, 1826	John McKinley (J)	Installed November 27, 1826
South Carolina (3)	William Harper (J)	Successor elected November 29, 1826	William Smith (J)	Installed November 29, 1826
Delaware (2)	Daniel Rodney (A)	Resigned January 12, 1827, after successor was elected	Henry M. Ridgely (J)	Installed January 23, 1827

=== House of Representatives ===
- Replacements: 11
  - Anti-Jackson: 1 seat net gain
  - Jackson: 1 seat net loss
- Deaths: 5
- Resignations: 10
- Contested election: 1
- Total seats with changes: 16

House changes
District	Vacated by	Reason for change	Successor	Date of successor's formal installation
Kentucky; 3rd	Henry Clay (A)	Resigned March 6, 1825, after being appointed US Secretary of State	James Clark (A)	Seated August 1, 1825
South Carolina; 1st	Joel R. Poinsett (J)	Resigned March 7, 1825, after being appointed Minister to Mexico	William Drayton (J)	Seated May 17, 1825
Pennsylvania; 16th	James Allison Jr. (J)	Resigned August 26, 1825 before the assembling of Congress	Robert Orr Jr. (J)	Seated October 11, 1825
New York; 20th	Egbert Ten Eyck (J)	Lost contested election December 15, 1825	Daniel Hugunin Jr. (A)	Seated December 15, 1825
Virginia; 5th	John Randolph (J)	Resigned December 26, 1825, after being appointed to the US Senate	George W. Crump (J)	Seated January 21, 1826
Maryland; 2nd	Joseph Kent (A)	Resigned January 6, 1826, after being elected Governor of Maryland	John C. Weems (J)	Seated February 1, 1826
Pennsylvania; 18th	Patrick Farrelly (J)	Died January 12, 1826	Thomas H. Sill (A)	Seated March 14, 1826
Mississippi at-large	Christopher Rankin (J)	Died March 14, 1826	William Haile (J)	Seated July 10, 1826
North Carolina; 8th	Willie P. Mangum (J)	Resigned March 18, 1826	Daniel L. Barringer (J)	Seated December 4, 1826
Pennsylvania; 13th	Alexander Thomson (J)	Resigned May 1, 1826	Chauncey Forward (J)	Seated December 4, 1826
Ohio; 10th	David Jennings (A)	Resigned May 25, 1826	Thomas Shannon (A)	Seated December 4, 1826
Kentucky; 5th	James Johnson (J)	Died August 13, 1826	Robert L. McHatton (J)	Seated December 7, 1826
Pennsylvania; 7th	Henry Wilson (J)	Died August 14, 1826	Jacob Krebs (J)	Seated December 4, 1826
Kentucky; 12th	Robert P. Henry (J)	Died August 25, 1826	John F. Henry (A)	Seated December 11, 1826
Maine; 5th	Enoch Lincoln (A)	Resigned before September 11, 1826	James W. Ripley (J)	Seated September 11, 1826
Pennsylvania; 2nd	Joseph Hemphill (J)	Resigned before October 10, 1826	Thomas Kittera (A)	Seated October 10, 1826

== Committees ==
Lists of committees and their party leaders.

=== Senate ===
- Agriculture (Chairman: William Findlay then Calvin Willey)
- Audit and Control the Contingent Expenses of the Senate (Chairman: Horatio Seymour then Elias Kane)
- Bankruptcy (Select)
- Claims (Chairman: Benjamin Ruggles)
- Commerce (Chairman: James Lloyd then Josiah S. Johnston)
- Debt Imprisonment Abolition (Select)
- Distributing Public Revenue Among the States (Select)
- District of Columbia (Chairman: Edward Lloyd then Ezekiel F. Chambers)
- Engrossed Bills (Chairman: William Marks)
- Finance (Chairman: Samuel Smith)
- Foreign Relations (Chairman: Nathaniel Macon then Littleton Tazewell)
- French Spoilations (Select)
- Georgia and the Creek Indians (Select)
- Indian Affairs (Chairman: Thomas Hart Benton)
- Judiciary (Chairman: Martin Van Buren)
- Manufactures (Chairman: Mahlon Dickerson)
- Military Affairs (Chairman: William Henry Harrison)
- Militia (Chairman: John Chandler)
- Naval Affairs (Chairman: Robert Y. Hayne)
- Pensions (Chairman: James Noble)
- Post Office and Post Roads (Chairman: Richard M. Johnson)
- Private Land Claims (Chairman: William South)
- Public Lands (Chairman: David Barton)
- Roads and Canals (Select) (Chairman: William Hendricks)
- Tariff Regulation (Select)
- Whole

=== House of Representatives ===
- Accounts (Chairman: Samuel C. Allen)
- Agriculture (Chairman: Stephen Van Rensselaer)
- American Colonization Society (Select)
- Apportionment of Representatives (Select)
- Bills of Exchange (Select)
- Claims (Chairman: Lewis Williams)
- Commerce (Chairman: Thomas Newton Jr. then Gideon Tomlinson)
- District of Columbia (Chairman: Mark Alexander)
- Elections (Chairman: John Sloane)
- Expenditures in the Navy Department (Chairman: Jeremiah O'Brien)
- Expenditures in the Post Office Department (Chairman: William Wilson)
- Expenditures in the State Department (Chairman: John Bailey)
- Expenditures in the Treasury Department (Chairman: William Burleigh)
- Expenditures in the War Department (Chairman: John Mattocks)
- Expenditures on Public Buildings (Chairman: Joseph Johnson)
- Foreign Affairs (Chairman: John Forsyth)
- Indian Affairs (Chairman: John Cocke)
- Judiciary (Chairman: Daniel Webster)
- Manufactures (Chairman: Rollin C. Mallary)
- Military Affairs (Chairman: James Hamilton Jr.)
- Military Pensions (Chairman: Tristram Burges)
- Naval Affairs (Chairman: Henry R. Storrs)
- Post Office and Post Roads (Chairman: Samuel D. Ingham)
- Public Expenditures (Chairman: Weldon N. Edwards)
- Public Lands (Chairman: Christopher Rankin then John Scott)
- Revisal and Unfinished Business (Chairman: Thomas P. Moore)
- Revolutionary Claims (Chairman: Robert Allen)
- Rules (Select)
- Standards of Official Conduct
- Territories (Chairman: James Strong)
- Ways and Means (Chairman: Louis McLane)
- Whole

=== Joint committees ===
- Enrolled Bills
- The Library
- Police and Preservation of the Capital

== Employees ==
=== Legislative branch agency directors ===
- Architect of the Capitol: Charles Bulfinch
- Librarian of Congress: George Watterston

=== Senate ===
- Chaplain: Charles P. McIlvaine (Episcopal), until December 12, 1825
  - William Staughton (Baptist), elected December 12, 1825
  - William Ryland (Methodist), elected December 8, 1826
- Secretary: Charles Cutts, until December 12, 1825
  - Walter Lowrie, elected December 12, 1825
- Sergeant at Arms: Mountjoy Bayly

=== House of Representatives ===
- Chaplain: Reuben Post (Presbyterian)
- Clerk: Matthew St. Clair Clarke
- Doorkeeper: Benjamin Birch
- Sergeant at Arms: John O. Dunn

== See also ==
- 1824 United States elections (elections leading to this Congress)
  - 1824 United States presidential election
  - 1824–25 United States Senate elections
  - 1824–25 United States House of Representatives elections
- 1826 United States elections (elections during this Congress, leading to the next Congress)
  - 1826–27 United States Senate elections
  - 1826–27 United States House of Representatives elections
