= 20th United States Congress =

1827-1829 U.S. Congress

←	19th	21st	→
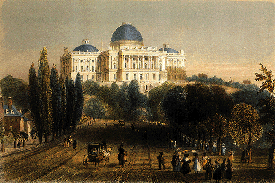
- United States Capitol (1827)

Overview
- Legislative body: United States Congress
- Jurisdiction: United States
- Term: March 4, 1827 – March 4, 1829

Senate
- Members: 48
- President: John C. Calhoun (J)
- President pro tempore: Samuel Smith (J)
- Party control: Jacksonian

House of Representatives
- Members: 213 representatives 3 non-voting delegates
- Speaker: Andrew Stevenson (J)
- Party control: Jacksonian

Sessions
- 1st: December 3, 1827 – May 26, 1828
- 2nd: December 1, 1828 – March 3, 1829

The 20th United States Congress was a meeting of the legislative branch of the United States federal government, consisting of the United States Senate and the United States House of Representatives. It met in Washington, D.C. from March 4, 1827, to March 4, 1829, during the third and fourth years of John Quincy Adams's presidency. The apportionment of seats in the House of Representatives was based on the 1820 United States census. Both chambers had a Jacksonian majority.

== Major events ==
- December 3, 1828: U.S. presidential election, 1828: Challenger Andrew Jackson beat incumbent John Quincy Adams and was elected President of the United States

== Major legislation ==
- May 24, 1828: Tariff of Abominations, ch. 111, 4 Stat. 308

== Party summary ==
The count below identifies party affiliations at the beginning of the first session of this congress. Changes resulting from subsequent replacements are shown below in the "Changes in membership" section.

=== Senate ===
	Party (shading shows control)		Total	Vacant
	National Republican (NR)	Jacksonian (J)	Total	Vacant
End of previous congress	22	26	48	0
Begin	20	27	47	1
End	21	26	47	1
Final voting share	44.7%	55.3%		
Beginning of next congress	22	26	48	0

=== House of Representatives ===
	Party (shading shows control)			Total	Vacant
	National Republican (NR)	Jacksonian (J)	Other	Total	Vacant
End of previous congress	111	102	0	213	0
Begin	99	113	0	212	1
End	99	113	0	212	1
Final voting share	46.7%	53.3%	0.0%		
Beginning of next congress	71	136	4 (Note: Anti-Masonic)	211	2

== Leadership ==
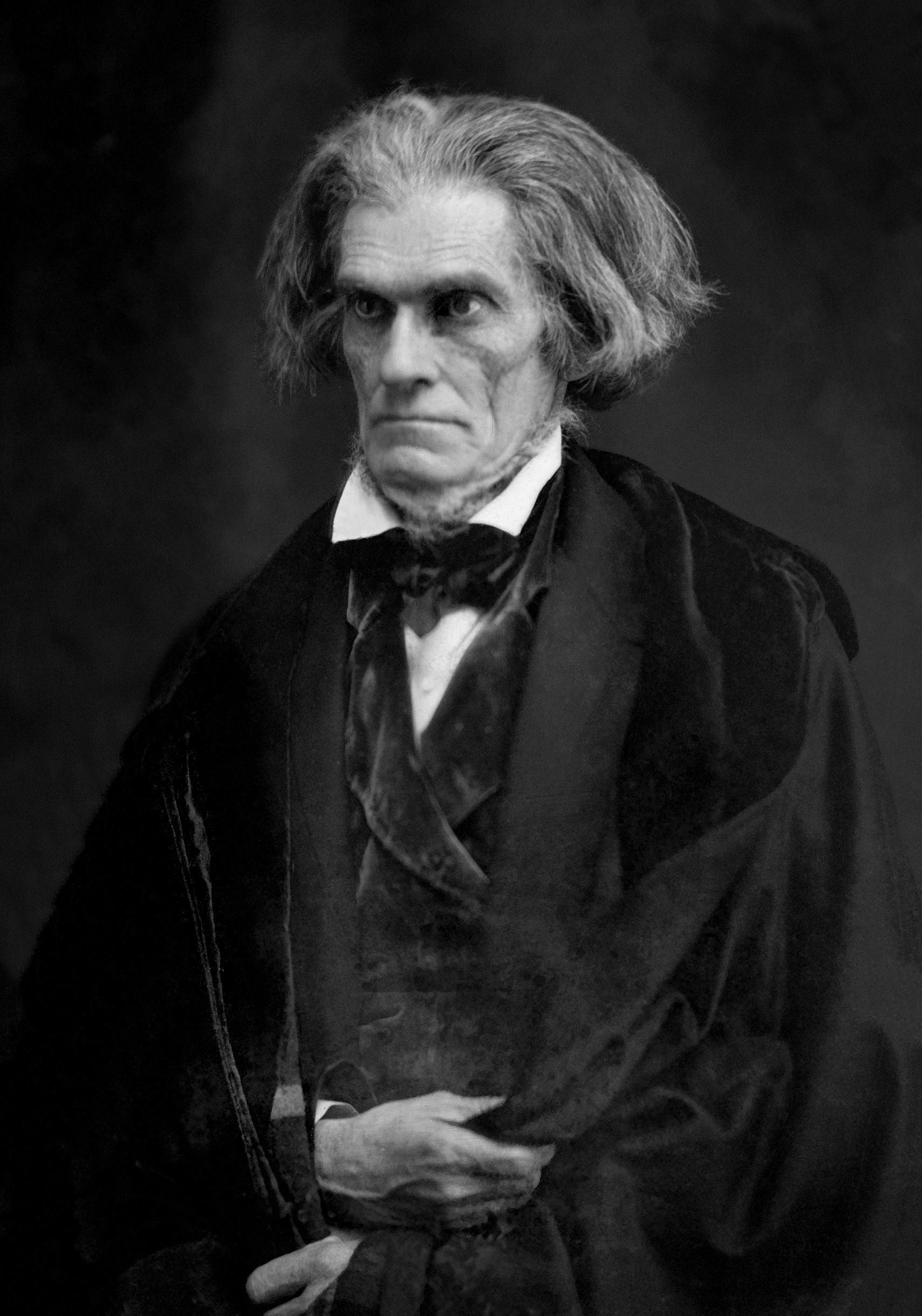
President of the Senate John C. Calhoun

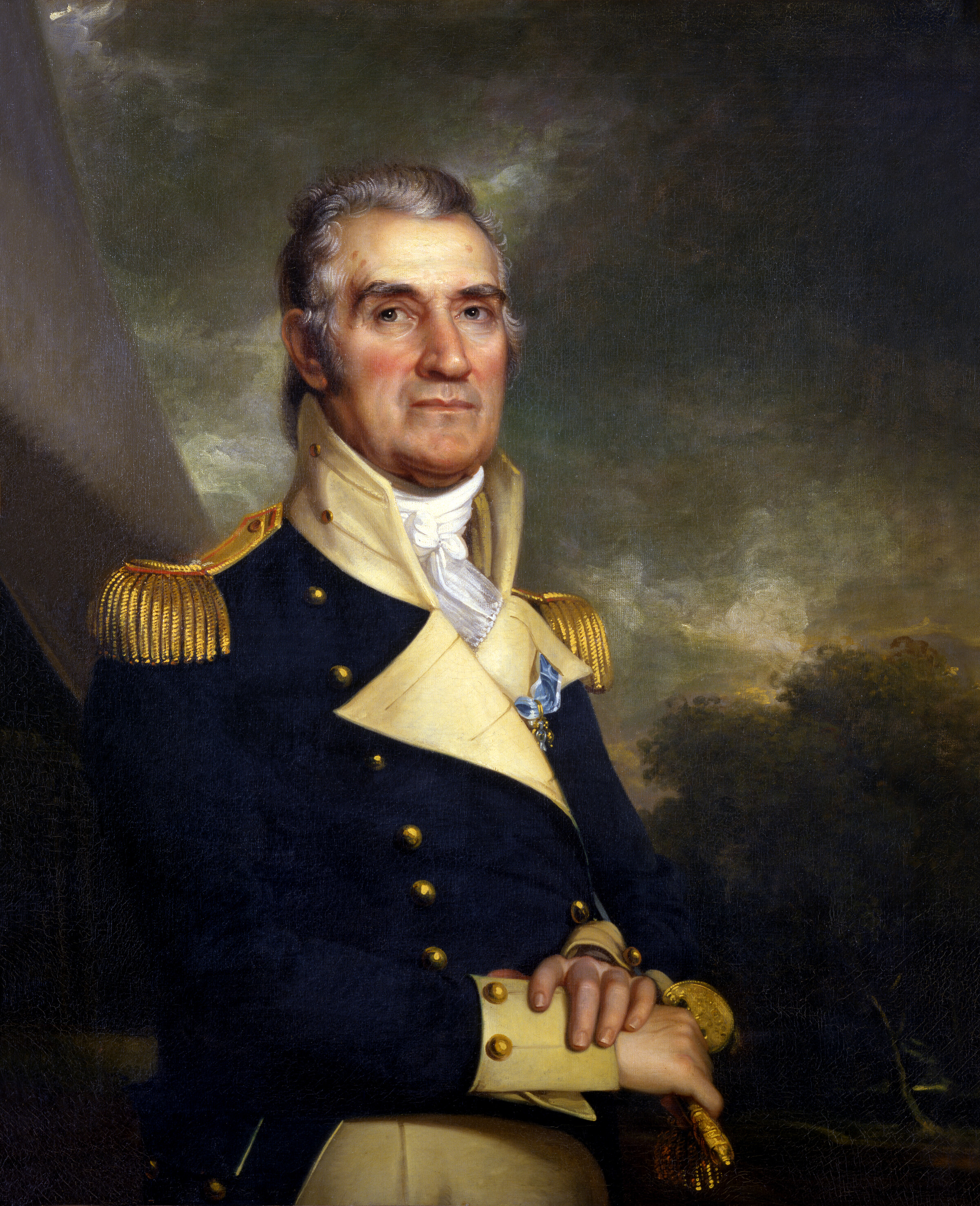
Senate President pro tempore Samuel Smith

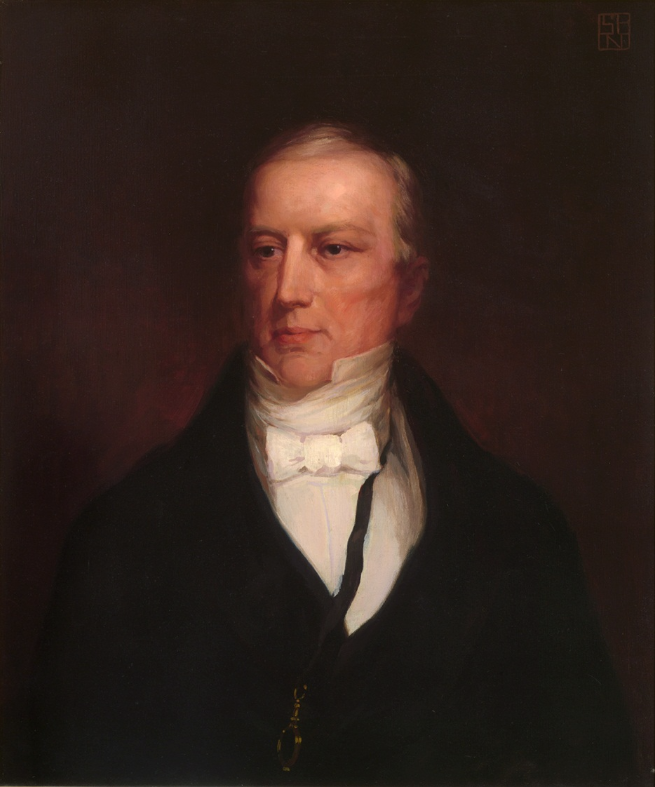
Speaker Andrew Stevenson

=== Senate ===
- President: John C. Calhoun (J)
- President pro tempore: Samuel Smith (J)

=== House of Representatives ===
- Speaker: Andrew Stevenson (J)

== Members ==
This list is arranged by chamber, then by state. Senators are listed by class and representatives are listed by district.

Skip to House of Representatives, below

=== Senate ===
Senators were elected by the state legislatures every two years, with one-third beginning new six-year terms with each Congress. Preceding the names in the list below are Senate class numbers, which indicate the cycle of their election. In this Congress, Class 1 meant their term began with this Congress, facing re-election in 1832; Class 2 meant their term ended with this Congress, facing re-election in 1828; and Class 3 meant their term began in the last Congress, facing re-election in 1830.

==== Alabama ====
▌2. William R. King (J)
▌3. John McKinley (J)

==== Connecticut ====
▌1. Samuel A. Foot (NR)
▌3. Calvin Willey (NR)

==== Delaware ====
▌1. Louis McLane (J)
▌2. Henry M. Ridgely (J)

==== Georgia ====
▌2. Thomas W. Cobb (J), until November 7, 1828

▌Oliver H. Prince (J), from November 7, 1828

▌3. John Macpherson Berrien (J)

==== Illinois ====
▌2. Jesse B. Thomas (NR)
▌3. Elias K. Kane (J)

==== Indiana ====
▌1. James Noble (NR)
▌3. William Hendricks (NR)

==== Kentucky ====
▌2. Richard M. Johnson (J)
▌3. John Rowan (J)

==== Louisiana ====
▌2. Dominique J. Bouligny (NR)
▌3. Josiah S. Johnston (NR)

==== Maine ====
▌1. Albion K. Parris (J), until August 26, 1828

▌John Holmes (NR), from January 15, 1829

▌2. John Chandler (J)

==== Maryland ====
▌1. Samuel Smith (J)
▌3. Ezekiel F. Chambers (NR)

==== Massachusetts ====
▌1. Daniel Webster (NR), from June 8, 1827
▌2. Nathaniel Silsbee (NR)

==== Mississippi ====
▌1. Powhatan Ellis (J)
▌2. Thomas H. Williams (J)

==== Missouri ====
▌1. Thomas H. Benton (J)
▌3. David Barton (NR)

==== New Hampshire ====
▌2. Samuel Bell (NR)
▌3. Levi Woodbury (J)

==== New Jersey ====
▌1. Ephraim Bateman (NR), until January 12, 1829

▌Mahlon Dickerson (J), from January 30, 1829

▌2. Mahlon Dickerson (J), until January 30, 1829, vacant thereafter

==== New York ====
▌1. Martin Van Buren (J), until December 20, 1828

▌Charles E. Dudley (J), from January 15, 1829

▌3. Nathan Sanford (NR)

==== North Carolina ====
▌2. John Branch (J)
▌3. Nathaniel Macon (J), until November 14, 1828

▌James Iredell Jr. (J), from December 15, 1828

==== Ohio ====
▌1. Benjamin Ruggles (NR)
▌3. William Henry Harrison (NR), until May 20, 1828

▌Jacob Burnet (NR), from December 10, 1828

==== Pennsylvania ====
▌1. Isaac D. Barnard (J)
▌3. William Marks (NR)

==== Rhode Island ====
▌1. Asher Robbins (NR)
▌2. Nehemiah R. Knight (NR)

==== South Carolina ====
▌2. Robert Y. Hayne (J)
▌3. William Smith (J)

==== Tennessee ====
▌1. John H. Eaton (J)
▌2. Hugh Lawson White (J)

==== Vermont ====
▌1. Horatio Seymour (NR)
▌3. Dudley Chase (NR)

==== Virginia ====
▌1. John Tyler (J)
▌2. Littleton W. Tazewell (J)

Senators' party membership by state at the opening of the 20th Congress in March 1827. 2 Jacksonians 1 Jacksonian and 1 Anti-Jacksonian 2 Anti-Jacksonians

=== House of Representatives ===
The names of representatives are preceded by their district numbers.

==== Alabama ====
▌1. Gabriel Moore (J)
▌2. John McKee (J)
▌3. George W. Owen (J)

==== Connecticut ====
All representatives were elected statewide on a general ticket.

▌At-large. John Baldwin (NR)
▌At-large. Noyes Barber (NR)
▌At-large. Ralph I. Ingersoll (NR)
▌At-large. Orange Merwin (NR)
▌At-large. Elisha Phelps (NR)
▌At-large. David Plant (NR)

==== Delaware ====
▌At-large. Kensey Johns Jr. (NR), from October 2, 1827

==== Georgia ====
Two representatives replacing those who had resigned were elected statewide on a general ticket.

▌1. Edward F. Tattnall (J), until sometime in 1827

▌George R. Gilmer (J), from October 1, 1827

▌2. John Forsyth (J), until November 7, 1827

▌Richard Henry Wilde (J), from November 17, 1827

▌3. Wiley Thompson (J)
▌4. Wilson Lumpkin (J)
▌5. Charles E. Haynes (J)
▌6. Tomlinson Fort (J)
▌7. John Floyd (J)

==== Illinois ====
▌At-large. Joseph Duncan (J)

==== Indiana ====
▌1. Thomas H. Blake (NR)
▌2. Jonathan Jennings (NR)
▌3. Oliver H. Smith (J)

==== Kentucky ====
▌1. Henry Daniel (J)
▌2. Thomas Metcalfe (NR), until June 1, 1828

▌John Chambers (NR), from December 1, 1828

▌3. James Clark (NR)
▌4. Robert P. Letcher (NR)
▌5. Robert L. McHatton (J)
▌6. Joseph Lecompte (J)
▌7. Thomas P. Moore (J)
▌8. Richard A. Buckner (NR)
▌9. Charles A. Wickliffe (J)
▌10. Joel Yancey (J)
▌11. William S. Young (NR), until September 20, 1827

▌John Calhoon (NR), November 5, 1827 – November 7, 1827
▌Thomas Chilton (J), from December 22, 1827

▌12. Chittenden Lyon (J)

==== Louisiana ====
▌1. Edward Livingston (J)
▌2. Henry H. Gurley (NR)
▌3. William L. Brent (NR)

==== Maine ====
▌1. William Burleigh (NR), until July 2, 1827

▌Rufus McIntire (J), from September 10, 1827

▌2. John Anderson (J)
▌3. Joseph F. Wingate (NR)
▌4. Peleg Sprague (NR)
▌5. James W. Ripley (J)
▌6. Jeremiah O'Brien (NR)
▌7. Samuel Butman (NR)

==== Maryland ====
The 5th district was a plural district with two representatives.

▌1. Clement Dorsey (NR)
▌2. John C. Weems (J)
▌3. George C. Washington (NR)
▌4. Michael C. Sprigg (J)
▌5. John Barney (NR)
▌5. Peter Little (NR)
▌6. Levin Gale (J)
▌7. John L. Kerr (NR)
▌8. Ephraim K. Wilson (NR)

==== Massachusetts ====
▌1. Daniel Webster (NR), until May 30, 1827

▌Benjamin Gorham (NR), from July 23, 1827

▌2. Benjamin W. Crowninshield (NR)
▌3. John Varnum (NR)
▌4. Edward Everett (NR)
▌5. John Davis (NR)
▌6. John Locke (NR)
▌7. Samuel C. Allen (NR)
▌8. Isaac C. Bates (NR)
▌9. Henry W. Dwight (NR)
▌10. John Bailey (NR)
▌11. Joseph Richardson (NR)
▌12. James L. Hodges (NR)
▌13. John Reed Jr. (NR)

==== Mississippi ====
▌At-large. William Haile (J), until September 12, 1828

▌Thomas Hinds (J), from October 21, 1828

==== Missouri ====
▌At-large. Edward Bates (NR)

==== New Hampshire ====
All representatives were elected statewide on a general ticket.

▌At-large. David Barker Jr. (NR)
▌At-large. Ichabod Bartlett (NR)
▌At-large. Titus Brown (NR)
▌At-large. Jonathan Harvey (J)
▌At-large. Joseph Healy (NR)
▌At-large. Thomas Whipple Jr. (NR)

==== New Jersey ====
All representatives were elected statewide on a general ticket.

▌At-large. Lewis Condict (NR)
▌At-large. George Holcombe (J), until January 14, 1828

▌James F. Randolph (NR), from December 1, 1828

▌At-large. Isaac Pierson (NR)
▌At-large. Samuel Swan (NR)
▌At-large. Hedge Thompson (NR), until July 23, 1828

▌Thomas Sinnickson (NR), from December 1, 1828

▌At-large. Ebenezer Tucker (NR)

==== New York ====
There were three plural districts: the 20th & 26th had two representatives each, and the 3rd had three representatives.

▌1. Silas Wood (NR)
▌2. John J. Wood (J)
▌3. Churchill C. Cambreleng (J)
▌3. Jeromus Johnson (J)
▌3. Gulian C. Verplanck (J)
▌4. Aaron Ward (NR)
▌5. Thomas J. Oakley (J), until May 9, 1828

▌Thomas Taber II (J), from November 5, 1828

▌6. John Hallock Jr. (J)
▌7. George O. Belden (J)
▌8. James Strong (NR)
▌9. John D. Dickinson (NR)
▌10. Stephen Van Rensselaer (NR)
▌11. Selah R. Hobbie (J)
▌12. John I. De Graff (J)
▌13. Samuel Chase (NR)
▌14. Henry R. Storrs (NR)
▌15. Michael Hoffman (J)
▌16. Henry Markell (NR)
▌17. John W. Taylor (NR)
▌18. Henry C. Martindale (NR)
▌19. Richard Keese (J)
▌20. Rudolph Bunner (J)
▌20. Silas Wright Jr. (J), until February 16, 1829, vacant thereafter
▌21. John C. Clark (J)
▌22. John G. Stower (J)
▌23. Jonas Earll Jr. (J)
▌24. Nathaniel Garrow (J)
▌25. David Woodcock (NR)
▌26. Dudley Marvin (NR)
▌26. John Maynard (NR)
▌27. Daniel D. Barnard (NR)
▌28. John Magee (J)
▌29. David E. Evans (J), until May 2, 1827

▌Phineas L. Tracy (NR), from November 5, 1827

▌30. Daniel G. Garnsey (J)

==== North Carolina ====
▌1. Lemuel Sawyer (J)
▌2. Willis Alston (J)
▌3. Thomas H. Hall (J)
▌4. John Heritage Bryan (NR)
▌5. Gabriel Holmes (J)
▌6. Daniel Turner (J)
▌7. John Culpepper (NR)
▌8. Daniel L. Barringer (J)
▌9. Augustine H. Shepperd (J)
▌10. John Long (NR)
▌11. Henry W. Connor (J)
▌12. Samuel P. Carson (J)
▌13. Lewis Williams (NR)

==== Ohio ====
▌1. James Findlay (J)
▌2. John Woods (NR)
▌3. William McLean (NR)
▌4. Joseph Vance (NR)
▌5. William Russell (J)
▌6. William Creighton Jr. (NR), until sometime in 1828

▌Francis S. Muhlenberg (NR), from December 19, 1828

▌7. Samuel F. Vinton (NR)
▌8. William Wilson (NR), until June 6, 1827

▌William Stanbery (J), from October 9, 1827

▌9. Philemon Beecher (NR)
▌10. John Davenport (NR)
▌11. John C. Wright (NR)
▌12. John Sloane (NR)
▌13. Elisha Whittlesey (NR)
▌14. Mordecai Bartley (NR)

==== Pennsylvania ====
There were six plural districts: the 7th, 8th, 11th & 16th had two representatives each, and the 4th & 9th had three representatives each.

▌1. Joel B. Sutherland (J)
▌2. John Sergeant (NR)
▌3. Daniel H. Miller (J)
▌4. Samuel Anderson (NR)
▌4. James Buchanan (J)
▌4. Charles Miner (NR)
▌5. John B. Sterigere (J)
▌6. Innis Green (J)
▌7. William Addams (J)
▌7. Joseph Fry Jr. (J)
▌8. Samuel D. Ingham (J)
▌8. George Wolf (J)
▌9. George Kremer (J)
▌9. Samuel McKean (J)
▌9. Espy Van Horne (J)
▌10. Adam King (J)
▌11. William Ramsey (J)
▌11. James Wilson (NR)
▌12. John Mitchell (J)
▌13. Chauncey Forward (J)
▌14. Andrew Stewart (NR)
▌15. Joseph Lawrence (NR)
▌16. Robert Orr Jr. (J)
▌16. James S. Stevenson (J)
▌17. Richard Coulter (J)
▌18. Stephen Barlow (J)

==== Rhode Island ====
Both representatives were elected statewide on a general ticket.

▌At-large. Tristam Burges (NR)
▌At-large. Dutee J. Pearce (NR)

==== South Carolina ====
▌1. William Drayton (J)
▌2. James Hamilton Jr. (J)
▌3. Thomas R. Mitchell (J)
▌4. William D. Martin (J)
▌5. George McDuffie (J)
▌6. Warren R. Davis (J)
▌7. William T. Nuckolls (J)
▌8. John Carter (J)
▌9. Starling Tucker (J)

==== Tennessee ====
▌1. John Blair (J)
▌2. Pryor Lea (J)
▌3. James C. Mitchell (J)
▌4. Jacob C. Isacks (J)
▌5. Robert Desha (J)
▌6. James K. Polk (J)
▌7. John Bell (J)
▌8. John H. Marable (J)
▌9. Davy Crockett (J)

==== Vermont ====
▌1. Jonathan Hunt (NR)
▌2. Rollin C. Mallary (NR)
▌3. George E. Wales (NR)
▌4. Benjamin Swift (NR)
▌5. Daniel A. A. Buck (NR)

==== Virginia ====
▌1. Thomas Newton Jr. (NR)
▌2. James Trezvant (J)
▌3. William S. Archer (J)
▌4. Mark Alexander (J)
▌5. John Randolph (J)
▌6. Thomas Davenport (J)
▌7. Nathaniel H. Claiborne (J)
▌8. Burwell Bassett (J)
▌9. Andrew Stevenson (J)
▌10. William C. Rives (J)
▌11. Philip P. Barbour (J)
▌12. John Roane (J)
▌13. John Taliaferro (NR)
▌14. Charles F. Mercer (NR)
▌15. John S. Barbour (J)
▌16. William Armstrong (NR)
▌17. Robert Allen (J)
▌18. Isaac Leffler (NR)
▌19. William McCoy (J)
▌20. John Floyd (J)
▌21. Lewis Maxwell (NR)
▌22. Alexander Smyth (J)

==== Non-voting members ====
Arkansas Territory. Henry W. Conway, until November 9, 1827

Ambrose H. Sevier, from February 13, 1828

Florida Territory. Joseph M. White
▌Michigan Territory. Austin E. Wing (NR)

== Changes in membership ==
The count below reflects changes from the beginning of the first session of this Congress.

=== Senate ===
- Replacements: 6
  - National Republican (NR): no net change
  - Jacksonian (J): no net change
- Deaths: 0
- Resignations: 7
- Interim appointments: 0
- Total seats with changes: 8

Senate changes
State (class)	Vacated by	Reason for change	Successor	Date of successor's formal installation (Note: When seated or oath administered, not necessarily when service began.)
Massachusetts (1)	Vacant	Seat remained vacant because legislature had failed to elect. Winner was elected June 8, 1827.	Daniel Webster (NR)	Installed December 17, 1827
Ohio (3)	William Henry Harrison (NR)	Resigned May 20, 1828, to become U.S. Minister Plenipotentiary to Gran Colombia. A special election was held December 10, 1828.	Jacob Burnet (NR)	Installed December 10, 1828
Maine (1)	Albion K. Parris (J)	Resigned August 26, 1828, after being appointed to the Maine Supreme Judicial Court. A special election was held January 15, 1829.	John Holmes (NR)	Installed January 15, 1829
Georgia (2)	Thomas W. Cobb (J)	Resigned before November 7, 1828. A special election was held November 7, 1828.	Oliver H. Prince (J)	Installed November 7, 1828
North Carolina (3)	Nathaniel Macon (J)	Resigned November 14, 1828. A special election was held December 15, 1828.	James Iredell Jr. (J)	Installed December 15, 1828
New York (1)	Martin Van Buren (J)	Resigned December 20, 1828, to become Governor of New York. A special election was held January 15, 1829.	Charles E. Dudley (J)	Installed January 15, 1829
New Jersey (1)	Ephraim Bateman (NR)	Resigned January 12, 1829, due to failing health. A special election was held January 30, 1829.	Mahlon Dickerson (J)	Installed January 30, 1829
New Jersey (2)	Mahlon Dickerson (J)	Resigned January 30, 1829, after being elected to New Jersey's Class 1 U.S. Senate seat.	Vacant	Not filled in this Congress

=== House of Representatives ===
- Replacements: 9
  - National Republican (NR): 1-seat net loss
  - Jacksonian (J): 1-seat net gain
- Deaths: 5
- Resignations: 9
- Contested election: 1
- Total seats with changes: 15

House changes
District	Vacated by	Reason for change	Successor	Date of successor's formal installation
Georgia's 1st	Edward F. Tattnall (J)	Resigned some time in 1827 before the assembling of Congress	George R. Gilmer (J)	Seated October 1, 1827
Delaware at-large	Vacant	Louis McLane (J) resigned despite winning reelection in 1826 after being elected to the US Senate.	Kensey Johns Jr. (NR)	Seated October 2, 1827
New York's 29th	David E. Evans (J)	Resigned May 2, 1827	Phineas L. Tracy (NR)	Seated November 5, 1827
Massachusetts's 1st	Daniel Webster (NR)	Resigned May 30, 1827, to run for the US Senate	Benjamin Gorham (NR)	Seated July 23, 1827
Ohio's 8th	William Wilson (NR)	Died June 6, 1827	William Stanbery (J)	Seated October 9, 1827
Maine's 1st	William Burleigh (NR)	Died July 2, 1827	Rufus McIntire (J)	Seated September 10, 1827
Kentucky's 11th	William S. Young (NR)	Died September 20, 1827	John Calhoon (NR)	Seated November 5, 1827
Kentucky's 11th	John Calhoon (NR)	Resigned November 7, 1827, to avoid an election dispute	Thomas Chilton (J)	Seated December 22, 1827
Georgia's 2nd	John Forsyth (J)	Resigned November 7, 1827, after being elected Governor of Georgia	Richard H. Wilde (J)	Seated November 17, 1827
Arkansas Territory at-large	Henry W. Conway	Died November 9, 1827	Ambrose H. Sevier	Seated February 13, 1828
New Jersey at-large	George Holcombe (J)	Died January 14, 1828	James F. Randolph (NR)	Seated December 1, 1828
New York's 5th	Thomas J. Oakley (J)	Resigned May 9, 1828, after being appointed judge of the Superior Court of New York City	Thomas Taber II (J)	Seated November 5, 1828
Kentucky's 2nd	Thomas Metcalfe (NR)	Resigned June 1, 1828, after being elected Governor of Kentucky	John Chambers (NR)	Seated December 1, 1828
New Jersey at-large	Hedge Thompson (NR)	Died July 23, 1828	Thomas Sinnickson (NR)	Seated December 1, 1828
Mississippi at-large	William Haile (J)	Resigned September 12, 1828	Thomas Hinds (J)	Seated October 21, 1828
Ohio's 6th	William Creighton Jr. (NR)	Resigned before December 19, 1828, after being nominated as a judge to district court	Francis S. Muhlenberg (NR)	Seated December 19, 1828
New York's 20th	Silas Wright (J)	Resigned February 16, 1829	Vacant	Not filled this Congress

== Committees ==
Lists of committees and their party leaders.

=== Senate ===
- Agriculture (Chairman: John Branch)
- Alabama Land Purchase (Select)
- Audit and Control the Contingent Expenses of the Senate (Chairman: Elias Kane)
- Claims (Chairman: Benjamin Ruggles)
- Commerce (Chairman: Levi Woodbury)
- Debt Imprisonment Abolition (Select)
- Distributing Public Revenue Among the States (Select)
- District of Columbia (Chairman: John Eaton)
- Engrossed Bills (Chairman: William Marks)
- Finance (Chairman: Samuel Smith)
- Foreign Relations (Chairman: Nathaniel Macon then Littleton Tazewell)
- French Spoilations (Select)
- Indian Affairs (Chairman: Thomas Hart Benton then Hugh Lawson White)
- Judiciary (Chairman: Martin Van Buren then John M. Berrien)
- Manufactures (Chairman: Samuel Smith)
- Military Affairs (Chairman: William Henry Harrison then Thomas Hart Benton)
- Militia (Chairman: John Chandler)
- Naval Affairs (Chairman: Robert Y. Hayne)
- Pensions (Chairman: James Noble)
- Post Office and Post Roads (Chairman: Richard M. Johnson)
- Private Land Claims (Chairman: William Smith)
- Public Lands (Chairman: David Barton)
- Revolutionary Officers (Select)
- Roads and Canals (Select) (Chairman: William Hendricks)
- Tariff Regulation (Select)
- Vaccination (Select)
- Whole

=== House of Representatives ===
- Accounts (Chairman: Samuel C. Allen)
- Agriculture (Chairman: Stephen Van Rensselaer)
- Assault on the President's Secretary (Select)
- American Colonization Society (Select)
- Claims (Chairman: Lewis Williams)
- Commerce (Chairman: Churchill C. Cambreleng)
- District of Columbia (Chairman: Mark Alexander)
- Elections (Chairman: John Sloane)
- Ethics (Chairman: N/A)
- Expenditures in the Navy Department (Chairman: Peter Little)
- Expenditures in the Post Office Department (Chairman: Gabriel Holmes)
- Expenditures in the State Department (Chairman: John Blair)
- Expenditures in the Treasury Department (Chairman: Thomas H. Hall)
- Expenditures in the War Department (Chairman: Charles Eaton Haynes)
- Expenditures on Public Buildings (Chairman: Michael C. Sprigg)
- Foreign Affairs (Chairman: Edward Everett)
- Indian Affairs (Chairman: William McLean)
- Judiciary (Chairman: Philip P. Barbour)
- Manufactures (Chairman: Rollin C. Mallary)
- Military Affairs (Chairman: James Hamilton Jr.)
- Military Pensions (Chairman: Tristam Burges)
- Naval Affairs (Chairman: Michael Hoffman)
- Post Office and Post Roads (Chairman: Samuel D. Ingham then Samuel McKean)
- Private Land Claims (Chairman: Richard Aylett Buckner)
- Public Expenditures (Chairman: Jeromus Johnson)
- Public Lands (Chairman: Jacob C. Isacks)
- Revisal and Unfinished Business (Chairman: Dutee J. Pearce)
- Revolutionary Claims (Chairman: George Wolf)
- Rules (Select)
- Standards of Official Conduct
- Territories (Chairman: James Strong)
- Ways and Means (Chairman: George McDuffie)
- Whole

=== Joint committees ===
- Enrolled Bills
- The Library
- To Prepare a Code of Laws for the District of Columbia

== Employees ==
=== Legislative branch agency directors ===
- Architect of the Capitol: Charles Bulfinch
- Librarian of Congress: George Watterston

=== Senate ===
- Chaplain: William Ryland (Methodist)
- Secretary: Walter Lowrie
- Sergeant at Arms: Mountjoy Bayly

=== House of Representatives ===
- Chaplain: Reuben Post (Presbyterian)
- Clerk: Matthew St. Clair Clarke
- Doorkeeper: Benjamin Birch
- Sergeant at Arms: John O. Dunn

== See also ==
- 1826 United States elections (elections leading to this Congress)
  - 1826–27 United States Senate elections
  - 1826–27 United States House of Representatives elections
- 1828 United States elections (elections during this Congress, leading to the next Congress)
  - 1828 United States presidential election
  - 1828–29 United States Senate elections
  - 1828–29 United States House of Representatives elections
