= Thomas Sinnickson =

Thomas Sinnickson may refer to:

- Thomas Sinnickson (merchant) (1744–1817), American merchant, U.S. Congressman for New Jersey
- Thomas Sinnickson (jurist) (1786–1873), American jurist, U.S. Congressman for New Jersey
