= 1795 New Jersey's at-large congressional district special election =

A special election was held in New Jersey's at-large congressional district on January 11, 1795, to fill a vacancy in the Third Congress left by the death of Abraham Clark (P) on September 15, 1794.

== Election results ==
Candidate	Party	Votes	Percent
Aaron Kitchell	Pro-Administration	2,065	97.1%
Robert Ogden	Unknown	62	2.92%

Kitchell took his seat in the Congress on January 29, 1795

== See also ==
- List of special elections to the United States House of Representatives
