= Isaac Pierson =

American politician

Member of the U.S. House of Representatives from New Jersey's at-large district
- In office March 4, 1827 – March 3, 1831
- Preceded by: George Cassedy
- Succeeded by: Silas Condit

Sheriff of Essex County, New Jersey
- In office 1807–1809

Personal details
- Born: August 15, 1770 Orange, Province of New Jersey, British America
- Died: September 22, 1833 (aged 63) Orange, New Jersey, U.S.
- Resting place: Rosedale Cemetery, Orange, New Jersey
- Party: Adams, Anti-Jacksonian
- Spouse: Nancy Crane
- Children: 10
- Parent(s): Matthias Pierson; Plebe Nutman
- Education: Princeton College; Columbia University College of Physicians and Surgeons

Isaac Pierson (August 15, 1770 – September 22, 1833) represented New Jersey's at-large congressional district in the United States House of Representatives from 1827 to 1831.

== Early life ==
Pierson was born on August 15, 1770, in Orange in the Province of New Jersey. He was the third child of Dr. Matthias Pierson and Phebe (née Nutman) Pierson. He descends from an early colonial immigrant, Thomas Pierson Sr. (brother of Rev. Abraham Pierson) who was one of the founders of Newark, New Jersey.

He attended private schools, and graduated from Princeton College in 1789. He studied medicine, graduated from the Columbia University College of Physicians and Surgeons in New York City, and commenced practice in Orange.

== Career ==
He was elected assessor of Orange on April 13, 1807, and served one year, and served as sheriff of Essex County from 1807 to 1809. He was president of the Medical Society of New Jersey in 1827.

Pierson was elected as an Adams candidate to the Twentieth Congress and reelected as an Anti-Jacksonian to the Twenty-first Congress, serving in office from March 4, 1827, to March 3, 1831, but was an unsuccessful candidate for reelection in 1830 to the Twenty-second Congress.

== Personal life ==
Pierson was married to Nancy Crane (1775–1841), the daughter of Aaron Crane. Together, they were the parents of ten children, including:

- William Pierson (1796–1882), a doctor who married Margaret Riker Hillyer (1797–1853).
- Albert Pierson (1798–1864), a reverend who married Jane Armstrong.
- Phebe Stockton Pierson (1801–1877), who married Stephen Condit (1791–1855).
- George Pierson (1805–1880), a reverend who married Eliza Day and, after her death, Caroline Stall.
- Edward Pierson (1808–1866), who married Phebe Rebecca Baldwin (1809–1889).
- Aaron Howell Pierson (1811–1863), who married Mary Caroline Ogden (1813–1873).

He died in Orange on September 22, 1833. He was buried at the Old Burying Ground, but was reinterred in Rosedale Cemetery in Orange in 1840.

U.S. House of Representatives
Preceded by George Cassedy	Member of the U.S. House of Representatives from New Jersey's at-large congressional district March 4, 1827 – March 3, 1831	Succeeded by Silas Condit
