= Joseph Kille =

American politician (1790–1865)

Member of the U.S. House of Representatives from New Jersey's at-large district
- In office March 4, 1839 – March 3, 1841 Serving with William R. Cooper, Philemon Dickerson, Joseph Fitz Randolph, Daniel Bailey Ryall, Peter D. Vroom
- Preceded by: John Patterson Bryan Maxwell
- Succeeded by: John Patterson Bryan Maxwell

Member of the New Jersey General Assembly
- In office 1815–1816, 1856

Sheriff of Salem County, New Jersey
- In office 1822–1829

Personal details
- Born: April 12, 1790 near Bridgeport, New Jersey, U.S.
- Died: March 1, 1865 (aged 74) Salem, New Jersey, U.S.
- Resting place: St. John's Episcopal Cemetery, Salem, New Jersey, U.S.
- Party: Democratic
- Profession: Politician

Joseph Kille (April 12, 1790 – March 1, 1865) was an American politician who served a single term in the United States House of Representatives, representing the at-large congressional district of New Jersey from 1839 to 1841 as a Democrat in the 26th United States Congress. Kille also served in the New Jersey General Assembly before and after his tenure in Congress.

== Early life and education ==
Kille was born near Bridgeport, New Jersey, on April 12, 1790. He pursued his education in Salem.

== Career ==
Kille served as sheriff of Salem County, New Jersey, from 1822 to 1829 and county clerk from 1829 to 1839.

Prior to serving in the United States Congress, Kille served in the New Jersey General Assembly from 1815 to 1816.

=== Congress ===
Kille served a single term in the United States House of Representatives, representing the at-large congressional district of New Jersey as a Democrat in the 26th United States Congress. His time in office began on March 4, 1839, and concluded on March 3, 1841.

=== Later career ===
Following his tenure in Congress, Kille served in the New Jersey General Assembly in 1856.

== Death ==
Kille died at the age of 74 in Salem on March 1, 1865. He was interred in St. John's Episcopal Cemetery, located in Salem.

== See also ==
- List of United States representatives who served a single term

New Jersey General Assembly
Preceded by —	Member of the New Jersey General Assembly; 1815–1816, 1856	Succeeded by —
U.S. House of Representatives
Preceded by John Patterson Bryan Maxwell	Member of the U.S. House of Representatives from New Jersey's at-large congressional district 1839–1841; Served alongside: William R. Cooper, Philemon Dickerson, Joseph Fitz Randolph, Daniel Bailey Ryall, Peter D. Vroom	Succeeded by John Patterson Bryan Maxwell
