= William McLean (Ohio politician) =

American politician

Member of the U.S. House of Representatives from Ohio's 3rd district
- In office March 4, 1823 – March 3, 1829
- Preceded by: Levi Barber
- Succeeded by: Joseph Halsey Crane

Personal details
- Born: August 10, 1794 Mason County, Kentucky
- Died: October 12, 1839 (aged 45) Cincinnati, Ohio
- Resting place: Spring Grove Cemetery
- Party: Democratic-Republican; Adams

William McLean (August 10, 1794 – October 12, 1839) was a lawyer, legislator and businessman. He served three terms in the U.S. House of Representatives from 1823 to 1829.

== Biography ==
William McLean was born in Mason County, Kentucky and moved in 1799 with his parents Fergus and Sophia (Blackford) McLean and his older brother John McLean (who would become a Congressman from Ohio and a Justice of the U.S. Supreme Court) to a farm in Warren County, Ohio. There he attended the common schools, studied law and was admitted to the bar in 1814. He commenced practice in Cincinnati, Ohio and then was a lawyer at Lebanon, Ohio.

He removed from Lebanon to Piqua, Ohio about 1820 and was the first regular professional lawyer who settled in the village. He was receiver of public moneys and through his efforts a subsidy of 500,000 acres (2000 km^{2}) of land was procured for building the Ohio Canal from Cincinnati to Lake Erie.

=== Congress ===
In 1822, William McLean was elected from Ohio's 3rd congressional district, which covered nearly all Western Ohio north of Warren County. He took his seat in the Eighteenth Congress. He was reelected to the Nineteenth, and Twentieth Congresses. In the Twentieth Congress, he served as chairman of the House Committee on Indian Affairs.

=== Later career and death ===
William McLean returned to Cincinnati where he engaged in mercantile pursuits and the practice of law. He was also interested in agricultural pursuits. When his health began to fail, he retired from business and spent several months in Cuba hoping to derive benefit for his pulmonary disease by a change of climate. His condition did not improve, and after returning to Cincinnati, he spent some time in revisiting several points in his old Congressional district.

William McLean died at his home in Cincinnati and was interred in the Catharine Street Burying Ground. In 1863, he was reinterred in Spring Grove Cemetery.

U.S. House of Representatives
Preceded by Levi Barber	Member of the U.S. House of Representatives from Ohio's 3rd congressional district 1823–1829	Succeeded by Joseph Halsey Crane
