= Bernard Smith (New Jersey politician) =

American politician

Bernard Smith (July 5, 1776 – July 16, 1835) was an American politician who served one term as a United States representative from New Jersey from 1819 to 1821.

== Biography ==
He was born in Morristown, New Jersey. After completing preparatory studies he was collector of customs in 1809 and 1810, and then postmaster of New Brunswick from 1810-1819.

=== Congress ===
He was elected as a Democratic-Republican to the Sixteenth Congress (March 4, 1819 – March 3, 1821). He did not seek renomination in 1820.

=== Later years ===
Following this, he was appointed register of the land office at Little Rock, Arkansas in 1821, and settled in that state. He was then secretary to the governor of Arkansas 1825-1828; appointed by Governor George Izard as subagent of the Quapaw in 1825, and served until his death.

=== Death and burial ===
He died in Little Rock on July 16, 1835. Now, he is interred in Mount Holly Cemetery.

U.S. House of Representatives
| Preceded by Benjamin Bennet | Member of the U.S. House of Representatives from New Jersey's at-large congressional district 1819–1821 | Succeeded by George Holcombe |
