= St. John's Episcopal Cemetery, Salem =

Cemetery in Salem County, New Jersey

Coordinates: 39.5744°N 75.4655°W

St. John's Episcopal Cemetery is a cemetery in Salem, the historic county seat of Salem County.

== Noted interments ==
- Samuel Dick (1740–1812), delegate to the Continental Congress from New Jersey, 1784–1785
- Daniel Garrison (1782–1851), represented New Jersey's 3rd congressional district from 1823 to 1825; at-large from 1825 to 1827
- Jacob Hufty (1850-1814), represented New Jersey in the United States House of Representatives from 1809 to 1814
- Joseph Kille (1790–1865), represented New Jersey in the United States House of Representatives at-large from 1839 to 1841
- Clement Hall Sinnickson (1834–1919), represented New Jersey's 1st congressional district from March 4, 1875, until March 3, 1879
- Thomas Sinnickson (1744–1817), represented New Jersey in the United States House of Representatives at-large, 1789–1791 and 1797–1799
- Thomas Sinnickson (1786–1873), represented New Jersey in the United States House of Representatives from 1828 to 1829
- Thomas J. Yorke (1801–1882), represented New Jersey in the United States House of Representatives at-large from 1837 to 1839 and from 1841 to 1843
