= Silas Condit =

American politician

Member of the United States House of Representatives from New Jersey's at-large district
- In office March 4, 1831 – March 3, 1833

Member of the New Jersey Legislative Council
- In office 1819–1822

Member of the New Jersey General Assembly
- In office 1816
- In office 1812–1813

Sheriff of Essex County, New Jersey
- In office 1813–1816

County Clerk of Essex County
- In office 1804–1811

Personal details
- Born: August 18, 1778 Orange, New Jersey, US
- Died: November 29, 1861 (aged 83) Newark, New Jersey, US
- Resting place: First Presbyterian Church and Cemetery, Newark, New Jersey, US
- Party: Anti-Jacksonian
- Parent: John Condit (father)
- Education: Princeton College

Silas Condit (August 18, 1778 – November 29, 1861) was a U.S. representative from New Jersey, serving one term from 1831 to 1833.

== Early life and career ==
Condit was born in Orange, New Jersey. He was the son of John Condit. Condit graduated from Princeton College in 1795. He engaged in mercantile pursuits in Orange, and moved to Newark, New Jersey.

== Political career ==
He served as clerk of Essex County from 1804 to 1811, and as sheriff of Essex County from 1813 to 1816. He served as member of the New Jersey General Assembly in 1812, 1813, and 1816, and served in the New Jersey Legislative Council from 1819 to 1822.

He served as president of the Newark Banking Co. 1820–1842.

== Congress ==
Condit was elected as an Anti-Jacksonian to the Twenty-second Congress, serving in office from March 4, 1831 to March 3, 1833. He engaged in banking. He served as delegate to the state constitutional convention in 1844.

== Death ==
He died in Newark, New Jersey, November 29, 1861, and was interred in that city's First Presbyterian Church Cemetery.

U.S. House of Representatives
Preceded by Isaac Pierson	Member of the U.S. House of Representatives from New Jersey's at-large congressional district March 4, 1831 – March 3, 1833	Succeeded by Philemon Dickerson
