= Samuel Dick =

American politician (1740–1812)

Samuel Dick (November 14, 1740 – November 16, 1812) was an American physician who was a delegate for New Jersey to the Confederation Congress in 1784 and 1785.

Samuel was born at Nottingham in Prince George's County, Maryland. He studied medicine in Scotland before he opened a practice in Salem in 1740. He married Sarah Sinnickson on October 10, 1773, and they had ten children (Rebecca, Mary, John, Samuel Jr., Andrew, Isabella, Anna, Samuel Stewart, William and Maria). Sarah was the daughter of Andrew Sinnickson, and her brother Thomas represented New Jersey in the first U.S. Congress.

Dick served in the New Jersey militia before and during the Revolutionary War. When the 2nd New Jersey Regiment joined the Continental Army and was assigned to cover the withdrawal after the failed invasion of Canada, he accompanied them north as a surgeon in 1776. In June, with the Canada assignment over he returned to New Jersey. Later that year he was appointed a colonel, commanding the western battalion of the Salem County militia.

Dick was first elected to represent Salem in the New Jersey General Assembly in 1777. He was also appointed collector of customs for the state's western district in 1778. The state legislature elected him as a delegate to the Confederation Congress in 1783. In 1787, he was a delegate to the New Jersey convention that ratified the United States Constitution. He served for several years as a surrogate in the county courts for Salem County. He was a candidate in the 1792 United States House of Representatives election in New Jersey, in which the top 4 won; he finished 10th.
