= Samuel Swan =

American politician

Member of the U.S. House of Representatives from New Jersey's at-large district
- In office March 4, 1821 – March 4, 1831
- Preceded by: Henry Southard
- Succeeded by: Isaac Southard

Personal details
- Born: 1771 Scotch Plains, New Jersey, British America
- Died: August 24, 1844 (aged 72–73) Bound Brook, New Jersey, U.S.
- Resting place: Presbyterian Cemetery, Bound Brook
- Party: Whig Party
- Other political affiliations: National Republican Party, Democratic-Republican Party
- Profession: Physician

Samuel Swan (1771, near Scotch Plains, New Jersey – August 24, 1844, Bound Brook, New Jersey), was an American medical doctor who served as a five-term U.S. Congressman, serving from 1821 to 1831.

== Biography ==
After studying medicine, Swan began to practice in Bound Brook, from 1800 to 1806 and then moved to Somerville from 1806 to 1809.

Before going to Washington, he also served as sheriff of Somerset County for two years and county clerk for 12 years.

=== Congress ===
He was elected to U.S. House of Representatives for the Seventeenth, Eighteenth, Nineteenth, Twentieth, and Twenty-first United States Congresses, serving from March 4, 1821, to March 3, 1831.

He was an at-large representative for all but his second term, during which he represented the 2nd congressional district. He retired without seeking renomination. Although he did not formally represent a party when elected to the House, he was eventually affiliated with the Whig Party.

=== Later career ===
After his congressional career, he returned to practicing medicine.

=== Death and burial ===
He is buried in the Presbyterian Cemetery in Bound Brook.

U.S. House of Representatives
Preceded by John Linn	Member of the U.S. House of Representatives from New Jersey's at-large congressional district 1821–1831	Succeeded by Isaac Southard
