= Isaac Southard =

American politician

Isaac Southard (August 30, 1783 - September 18, 1850) was an Anti-Jacksonian member of the United States House of Representatives from 1831 to 1833, representing New Jersey at-large.

== Early life ==
A son of Henry Southard, Isaac Southard was born in the city of Basking Ridge in Somerset County, New Jersey. He had a brother, Samuel Lewis Southard. Southard was educated at the classical school of his city, and engaged in the general merchandise business until 1814.

== Public service ==
- Deputy collector of internal revenue for Somerset County
- Major of the Second Battalion, Second Regiment, Somerset Brigade (appointed February 17, 1815)
- Director in the State Bank at Morristown, New Jersey
- Lay judge of Court of Common Pleas of Somerset (appointed November 13, 1820)
- Justice of the peace (commissioned November 16, 1820)
- County clerk of Somerset County (1820–1830)
- U.S. Representative (1831–1833)
- Master and examiner in chancery (appointed in 1833 by Gov. Elias P. Seeley
- Colonel in the New Jersey State Militia
- State treasurer of New Jersey (1837–1843)

== Congress ==
Southard was elected as an Anti-Jacksonian to the Twenty-second United States Congress, and began his term on March 4, 1831. He did not succeed in his bid for reelection, and his term ended on March 3, 1833.

== Retirement ==
After his time as State Treasurer, Southard lived in Trenton, NJ for several years before moving to Somerville, NJ, where he lived until his death on September 18, 1850. He was interred in the Old Cemetery.

U.S. House of Representatives
Preceded by Samuel Swan	Member of the U.S. House of Representatives from New Jersey's at-large congressional district 1831–1833	Succeeded by William N. Shinn
