= James H. Imlay =

American politician

James Henderson Imlay (November 26, 1764 – March 6, 1823) was an American educator, lawyer and politician who served as a United States representative from New Jersey. He served two terms from 1797 to 1801.

== Early life, education and career ==
Born in Imlaystown, he pursued classical studies and graduated from Princeton College in 1786, where he was also a tutor. He studied law, was admitted to the bar in 1791, and practiced.

He was a major in the Monmouth County Militia and served in the Revolutionary War. He was a counselor in 1796, and was a member of the New Jersey General Assembly from 1793 to 1796, serving as speaker in the latter year.

== Tenure in Congress ==
Imlay was elected as a Federalist to the Fifth and Sixth Congresses, serving from March 4, 1797 to March 3, 1801.

=== Impeachment manager for Blount proceedings ===
While in the House, he was one of the impeachment managers appointed by the House of Representatives in 1798 to conduct the impeachment proceedings against U.S. Senator William Blount of Tennessee.

== Later career and death ==
In 1804 and 1805, Imlay was postmaster of Allentown, New Jersey, and resumed the practice of law there; he died in Allentown in 1823. Interment was in the Presbyterian Church Cemetery.

U.S. House of Representatives
Preceded by Aaron Kitchell	Member of the U.S. House of Representatives from New Jersey's at-large congressional district March 4, 1797 – March 3, 1799	Succeeded by Ebenezer Elmer
Preceded by None	Member of the U.S. House of Representatives from New Jersey's 4th congressional district March 4, 1799 – March 3, 1801	Succeeded by Littleton Kirkpatrick
