= Thomas Jones Yorke =

American politician (1801–1882)

Member of the U.S. House of Representatives from New Jersey's at-large district
- In office March 4, 1841 – March 3, 1843
- Preceded by: Peter D. Vroom
- Succeeded by: Seat abolished
- In office March 4, 1837 – March 3, 1839
- Preceded by: William Norton Shinn
- Succeeded by: Peter D. Vroom

Personal details
- Born: March 25, 1801 Hancocks Bridge, New Jersey
- Died: April 4, 1882 (aged 81) Salem, New Jersey
- Party: Whig
- Occupation: Merchant, railroad executive

Thomas Jones Yorke (March 25, 1801 – April 4, 1882) was an American Whig Party politician from New Jersey who served two non-consecutive terms in the U.S. House of Representatives from 1837 to 1839, and from 1841 to 1843.

== Early life ==
Thomas Jones Yorke was born on March 25, 1801, in Hancock's Bridge (now part of Lower Alloways Creek Township), in Salem County, New Jersey. He attended common schools and Salem Academy. During the War of 1812, he served as a scout for the United States forces. He studied law, but did not practice.

== Career ==
Yorke engaged in mercantile pursuits in Salem. He was county collector of Salem County in 1830. Yorke served as judge of the Salem County Court of Common Pleas in 1833, 1834, and 1845 to 1854 and for a portion of the latter term was presiding judge. He served as a member of the New Jersey General Assembly in 1835.

Yorke was elected as a Whig to the United States House of Representatives from New Jersey in 1836 and served from March 4, 1837 to March 3, 1839. He was re-elected to the House in 1838 but the House declined to seat him. He was elected to the House in 1840 and served from March 4, 1841 to March 3, 1843. He served as chairman of the committee on expenditures of the Department of the Navy.

Yorke served as a director of the West Jersey Railroad Company. He served as secretary and treasurer in 1853 and as president from 1866 to 1875. He was also president of the Cape May & Millville Railroad Company. He served as director at various times of the Swedesborough Railroad Company, Salem Railroad Company, Camden & Philadelphia Ferry Company, and West Jersey Marl & Transportation Company.

== Personal life ==
Yorke died on April 4, 1882, at his home in Salem, New Jersey. He was interred in St. John's Episcopal Cemetery.

U.S. House of Representatives
Preceded by William N. Shinn	Member of the U.S. House of Representatives from New Jersey's at-large congressional district March 4, 1837 – March 3, 1839	Succeeded by Peter D. Vroom
Preceded by Peter D. Vroom	Member of the U.S. House of Representatives from New Jersey's at-large congressional district March 4, 1841 – March 3, 1843	Succeeded by Seat abolished
