= New Jersey's at-large congressional district =

- Obsolete district
- Created: 1789; 1801; 1815
- Eliminated: 1799; 1813; 1843
- Years active: 1789-1799; 1801-1813; 1815-1843

Beginning from its inception into statehood, New Jersey elected its representatives at-large instead of from individual districts. This continued for most years until 1843, with the exception of the years 1799–1801, and 1813–1815 when they were elected in districts. After 1843, New Jersey returned to district representation. Four at-large representatives were elected in 1789 until 1793 when a fifth representative was added. Six seats were allocated beginning in 1803, continuing until at-large representation ceased in 1843.

== List of members representing the district ==
Cong ress	Years	Seat A			Seat B			Seat C			Seat D			Seat E			Seat F		
Cong ress	Years	Rep.	Party	Electoral history	Rep.	Party	Electoral history	Rep.	Party	Electoral history	Rep.	Party	Electoral history	Rep.	Party	Electoral history	Rep.	Party	Electoral history
1st	March 4, 1789 – March 3, 1791	Elias Boudinot (Elizabethtown)	Pro-Admin.	Elected in 1789. Re-elected in 1791. Re-elected in 1792. Retired.	Thomas Sinnickson (Salem)	Pro-Admin.	Elected in 1789. Lost re-election.	James Schureman (New Brunswick)	Pro-Admin.	Elected in 1789. Lost re-election.	Lambert Cadwalader (Trenton)	Pro-Admin.	Elected in 1789. Lost re-election.	Seat created in 1793			Seat created in 1803		
2nd	March 4, 1791 – March 3, 1793	Elias Boudinot (Elizabethtown)	Pro-Admin.	Elected in 1789. Re-elected in 1791. Re-elected in 1792. Retired.	Abraham Clark (Rahway)	Pro-Admin.	Elected in 1791. Re-elected in 1792. Died.	Jonathan Dayton (Elizabethtown)	Pro-Admin.	Elected in 1791. Re-elected in 1792. Re-elected in 1794. Re-elected in 1797. Redistricted to the 3rd district and retired to run for U.S. Senator.	Aaron Kitchell (Hanover Township)	Anti-Admin.	Elected in 1791. Lost re-election.	Seat created in 1793			Seat created in 1803		
3rd	March 4, 1793 – September 15, 1794	Elias Boudinot (Elizabethtown)	Pro-Admin.	Elected in 1789. Re-elected in 1791. Re-elected in 1792. Retired.	Abraham Clark (Rahway)	Pro-Admin.	Elected in 1791. Re-elected in 1792. Died.	Jonathan Dayton (Elizabethtown)	Pro-Admin.	Elected in 1791. Re-elected in 1792. Re-elected in 1794. Re-elected in 1797. Redistricted to the 3rd district and retired to run for U.S. Senator.	Lambert Cadwalader (Trenton)	Pro-Admin.	Elected in 1792. Lost re-election.	John Beatty (Princeton)	Pro-Admin.	Elected in 1792. Lost re-election.	Seat created in 1803		
3rd	September 15, 1794 – January 29, 1795	Elias Boudinot (Elizabethtown)	Pro-Admin.	Elected in 1789. Re-elected in 1791. Re-elected in 1792. Retired.	Vacant			Jonathan Dayton (Elizabethtown)	Pro-Admin.	Elected in 1791. Re-elected in 1792. Re-elected in 1794. Re-elected in 1797. Redistricted to the 3rd district and retired to run for U.S. Senator.	Lambert Cadwalader (Trenton)	Pro-Admin.	Elected in 1792. Lost re-election.	John Beatty (Princeton)	Pro-Admin.	Elected in 1792. Lost re-election.	Seat created in 1803		
3rd	January 29, 1795 – March 3, 1795	Elias Boudinot (Elizabethtown)	Pro-Admin.	Elected in 1789. Re-elected in 1791. Re-elected in 1792. Retired.	Aaron Kitchell (Hanover Township)	Anti-Admin.	Elected in 1794 and elected to finish Clark's term. Lost re-election.	Jonathan Dayton (Elizabethtown)	Pro-Admin.	Elected in 1791. Re-elected in 1792. Re-elected in 1794. Re-elected in 1797. Redistricted to the 3rd district and retired to run for U.S. Senator.	Lambert Cadwalader (Trenton)	Pro-Admin.	Elected in 1792. Lost re-election.	John Beatty (Princeton)	Pro-Admin.	Elected in 1792. Lost re-election.	Seat created in 1803		
4th	March 4, 1795 – March 3, 1797	Thomas Henderson (Freehold)	Fed.	Elected in 1794. Lost re-election.	Aaron Kitchell (Hanover Township)	Dem.-Rep.	Elected in 1794 and elected to finish Clark's term. Lost re-election.	Jonathan Dayton (Elizabethtown)	Fed.	Elected in 1791. Re-elected in 1792. Re-elected in 1794. Re-elected in 1797. Redistricted to the 3rd district and retired to run for U.S. Senator.	Isaac Smith (Trenton)	Fed.	Elected in 1794. Retired.	Mark Thomson (Changewater)	Fed.	Elected in 1794. Re-elected in 1797. Redistricted to the 2nd district and lost re-election.	Seat created in 1803		
5th	March 4, 1797 – March 3, 1799	James Schureman (New Brunswick)	Fed.	Elected in 1797. Redistricted to the 5th district and lost re-election.	James H. Imlay (Allentown)	Fed.	Elected in 1797. Redistricted to the 4th district and re-elected.	Jonathan Dayton (Elizabethtown)	Fed.	Elected in 1791. Re-elected in 1792. Re-elected in 1794. Re-elected in 1797. Redistricted to the 3rd district and retired to run for U.S. Senator.	Thomas Sinnickson (Salem)	Fed.	Elected in 1797. Redistricted to the 5th district. but unknown if then retired or lost.	Mark Thomson (Changewater)	Fed.	Elected in 1794. Re-elected in 1797. Redistricted to the 2nd district and lost re-election.	Seat created in 1803		
6th	March 4, 1799– March 3, 1801	District representation only			District representation only			District representation only			District representation only			District representation only			Seat created in 1803		
7th	March 4, 1801 – March 3, 1803	John Condit (Orange)	Dem.-Rep.	Redistricted from the 1st district and re-elected in 1800. Retired to run for U.S. senator.	Ebenezer Elmer (Bridgeton)	Dem.-Rep.	Elected in 1800. Re-elected in 1803. Re-elected in 1804. Lost re-election.	William Helms (Hackettstown)	Dem.-Rep.	Elected in 1800. Re-elected in 1803. Re-elected in 1804. Re-elected in 1806. Re-elected in 1808. Retired.	James Mott (Middletown)	Dem.-Rep.	Elected in 1800. Re-elected in 1803. Retired.	Henry Southard (Basking Ridge)	Dem.-Rep.	Elected in 1800. Re-elected in 1803. Re-elected in 1804. Re-elected in 1806. Re-elected in 1808. Retired.	Seat created in 1803		
8th	March 4, 1803 – March 3, 1805	Adam Boyd (Hackensack)	Dem.-Rep.	Elected in 1803. Retired.	Ebenezer Elmer (Bridgeton)	Dem.-Rep.	Elected in 1800. Re-elected in 1803. Re-elected in 1804. Lost re-election.	William Helms (Hackettstown)	Dem.-Rep.	Elected in 1800. Re-elected in 1803. Re-elected in 1804. Re-elected in 1806. Re-elected in 1808. Retired.	James Mott (Middletown)	Dem.-Rep.	Elected in 1800. Re-elected in 1803. Retired.	Henry Southard (Basking Ridge)	Dem.-Rep.	Elected in 1800. Re-elected in 1803. Re-elected in 1804. Re-elected in 1806. Re-elected in 1808. Retired.	James Sloan (Newton Township)	Dem.-Rep.	Elected in 1803. Re-elected in 1804. Re-elected in 1806. Retired.
9th	March 4, 1805 – March 3, 1807	Ezra Darby (Scotch Plains)	Dem.-Rep.	Elected in 1804. Re-elected in 1806. Died.	Ebenezer Elmer (Bridgeton)	Dem.-Rep.	Elected in 1800. Re-elected in 1803. Re-elected in 1804. Lost re-election.	William Helms (Hackettstown)	Dem.-Rep.	Elected in 1800. Re-elected in 1803. Re-elected in 1804. Re-elected in 1806. Re-elected in 1808. Retired.	John Lambert (Lambertville)	Dem.-Rep.	Elected in 1804. Re-elected in 1806. Retired.	Henry Southard (Basking Ridge)	Dem.-Rep.	Elected in 1800. Re-elected in 1803. Re-elected in 1804. Re-elected in 1806. Re-elected in 1808. Retired.	James Sloan (Newton Township)	Dem.-Rep.	Elected in 1803. Re-elected in 1804. Re-elected in 1806. Retired.
10th	March 4, 1807 – January 27, 1808	Ezra Darby (Scotch Plains)	Dem.-Rep.	Elected in 1804. Re-elected in 1806. Died.	Thomas Newbold (Springfield Township)	Dem.-Rep.	Elected in 1806. Re-elected in 1808. Re-elected in 1810. Retired.	William Helms (Hackettstown)	Dem.-Rep.	Elected in 1800. Re-elected in 1803. Re-elected in 1804. Re-elected in 1806. Re-elected in 1808. Retired.	John Lambert (Lambertville)	Dem.-Rep.	Elected in 1804. Re-elected in 1806. Retired.	Henry Southard (Basking Ridge)	Dem.-Rep.	Elected in 1800. Re-elected in 1803. Re-elected in 1804. Re-elected in 1806. Re-elected in 1808. Retired.	James Sloan (Newton Township)	Dem.-Rep.	Elected in 1803. Re-elected in 1804. Re-elected in 1806. Retired.
10th	January 27, 1808 – March 8, 1808	Vacant			Thomas Newbold (Springfield Township)	Dem.-Rep.	Elected in 1806. Re-elected in 1808. Re-elected in 1810. Retired.	William Helms (Hackettstown)	Dem.-Rep.	Elected in 1800. Re-elected in 1803. Re-elected in 1804. Re-elected in 1806. Re-elected in 1808. Retired.	John Lambert (Lambertville)	Dem.-Rep.	Elected in 1804. Re-elected in 1806. Retired.	Henry Southard (Basking Ridge)	Dem.-Rep.	Elected in 1800. Re-elected in 1803. Re-elected in 1804. Re-elected in 1806. Re-elected in 1808. Retired.	James Sloan (Newton Township)	Dem.-Rep.	Elected in 1803. Re-elected in 1804. Re-elected in 1806. Retired.
10th	March 8, 1808 – March 3, 1809	Adam Boyd (Hackensack)	Dem.-Rep.	Elected to finish Darby's term. Re-elected in 1808. Re-elected in 1810. Redistricted to the 1st district and lost re-election.	Thomas Newbold (Springfield Township)	Dem.-Rep.	Elected in 1806. Re-elected in 1808. Re-elected in 1810. Retired.	William Helms (Hackettstown)	Dem.-Rep.	Elected in 1800. Re-elected in 1803. Re-elected in 1804. Re-elected in 1806. Re-elected in 1808. Retired.	John Lambert (Lambertville)	Dem.-Rep.	Elected in 1804. Re-elected in 1806. Retired.	Henry Southard (Basking Ridge)	Dem.-Rep.	Elected in 1800. Re-elected in 1803. Re-elected in 1804. Re-elected in 1806. Re-elected in 1808. Retired.	James Sloan (Newton Township)	Dem.-Rep.	Elected in 1803. Re-elected in 1804. Re-elected in 1806. Retired.
11th	March 4, 1809 – September 12, 1810	Adam Boyd (Hackensack)	Dem.-Rep.	Elected to finish Darby's term. Re-elected in 1808. Re-elected in 1810. Redistricted to the 1st district and lost re-election.	Thomas Newbold (Springfield Township)	Dem.-Rep.	Elected in 1806. Re-elected in 1808. Re-elected in 1810. Retired.	William Helms (Hackettstown)	Dem.-Rep.	Elected in 1800. Re-elected in 1803. Re-elected in 1804. Re-elected in 1806. Re-elected in 1808. Retired.	James Cox (Monmouth)	Dem.-Rep.	Elected in 1808. Died.	Henry Southard (Basking Ridge)	Dem.-Rep.	Elected in 1800. Re-elected in 1803. Re-elected in 1804. Re-elected in 1806. Re-elected in 1808. Retired.	Jacob Hufty (Salem)	Dem.-Rep.	Elected in 1808. Re-elected in 1810. Redistricted to the 3rd district and re-elected in 1813. Died May 20, 1814.
11th	September 12, 1810 – October 31, 1810	Adam Boyd (Hackensack)	Dem.-Rep.	Elected to finish Darby's term. Re-elected in 1808. Re-elected in 1810. Redistricted to the 1st district and lost re-election.	Thomas Newbold (Springfield Township)	Dem.-Rep.	Elected in 1806. Re-elected in 1808. Re-elected in 1810. Retired.	William Helms (Hackettstown)	Dem.-Rep.	Elected in 1800. Re-elected in 1803. Re-elected in 1804. Re-elected in 1806. Re-elected in 1808. Retired.	Vacant			Henry Southard (Basking Ridge)	Dem.-Rep.	Elected in 1800. Re-elected in 1803. Re-elected in 1804. Re-elected in 1806. Re-elected in 1808. Retired.	Jacob Hufty (Salem)	Dem.-Rep.	Elected in 1808. Re-elected in 1810. Redistricted to the 3rd district and re-elected in 1813. Died May 20, 1814.
11th	October 31, 1810 – March 3, 1811	Adam Boyd (Hackensack)	Dem.-Rep.	Elected to finish Darby's term. Re-elected in 1808. Re-elected in 1810. Redistricted to the 1st district and lost re-election.	Thomas Newbold (Springfield Township)	Dem.-Rep.	Elected in 1806. Re-elected in 1808. Re-elected in 1810. Retired.	William Helms (Hackettstown)	Dem.-Rep.	Elected in 1800. Re-elected in 1803. Re-elected in 1804. Re-elected in 1806. Re-elected in 1808. Retired.	John A. Scudder (Monmouth)	Dem.-Rep.	Elected to finish Cox's term. Retired.	Henry Southard (Basking Ridge)	Dem.-Rep.	Elected in 1800. Re-elected in 1803. Re-elected in 1804. Re-elected in 1806. Re-elected in 1808. Retired.	Jacob Hufty (Salem)	Dem.-Rep.	Elected in 1808. Re-elected in 1810. Redistricted to the 3rd district and re-elected in 1813. Died May 20, 1814.
12th	March 4, 1811 – March 3, 1813	Adam Boyd (Hackensack)	Dem.-Rep.	Elected to finish Darby's term. Re-elected in 1808. Re-elected in 1810. Redistricted to the 1st district and lost re-election.	Thomas Newbold (Springfield Township)	Dem.-Rep.	Elected in 1806. Re-elected in 1808. Re-elected in 1810. Retired.	Lewis Condict (Morristown)	Dem.-Rep.	Elected in 1810. Redistricted to the 1st district and re-elected in 1813.	George C. Maxwell (Raritan)	Dem.-Rep.	Elected in 1810. Retired.	James Morgan (South Amboy)	Dem.-Rep.	Elected in 1810. Redistricted to the 2nd district and lost re-election.	Jacob Hufty (Salem)	Dem.-Rep.	Elected in 1808. Re-elected in 1810. Redistricted to the 3rd district and re-elected in 1813. Died May 20, 1814.
13th	March 4, 1813– March 3, 1815	District representation only			District representation only			District representation only			District representation only			District representation only			District representation only		
14th	March 4, 1815 – March 3, 1817	Ezra Baker (Tuckerton)	Dem.-Rep.	Elected in 1814. Retired.	Ephraim Bateman (Cedarville)	Dem.-Rep.	Elected in 1814. Re-elected in 1816. Re-elected in 1818. Re-elected in 1820. Retired.	Thomas Ward (Newark)	Dem.-Rep.	Redistricted from the 1st district and re-elected in 1814. Retired.	Benjamin Bennet (Middletown)	Dem.-Rep.	Elected in 1814. Re-elected in 1816. Lost re-election.	Henry Southard (Basking Ridge)	Dem.-Rep.	Elected in 1814. Re-elected in 1816. Re-elected in 1818. Retired.	Lewis Condict (Morristown)	Dem.-Rep.	Redistricted from the 1st district and re-elected in 1814. Retired.
15th	March 4, 1817 – March 3, 1819	Joseph Bloomfield (Burlington)	Dem.-Rep.	Elected in 1816. Re-elected in 1818. Retired.	Ephraim Bateman (Cedarville)	Dem.-Rep.	Elected in 1814. Re-elected in 1816. Re-elected in 1818. Re-elected in 1820. Retired.	Charles Kinsey (Paterson)	Dem.-Rep.	Elected in 1816. Lost re-election.	Benjamin Bennet (Middletown)	Dem.-Rep.	Elected in 1814. Re-elected in 1816. Lost re-election.	Henry Southard (Basking Ridge)	Dem.-Rep.	Elected in 1814. Re-elected in 1816. Re-elected in 1818. Retired.	John Linn (Monroe)	Dem.-Rep.	Elected in 1816. Re-elected in 1818. Re-elected in 1820. Died.
16th	March 4, 1819 – November 4, 1819	Joseph Bloomfield (Burlington)	Dem.-Rep.	Elected in 1816. Re-elected in 1818. Retired.	Ephraim Bateman (Cedarville)	Dem.-Rep.	Elected in 1814. Re-elected in 1816. Re-elected in 1818. Re-elected in 1820. Retired.	John Condit (Orange)	Dem.-Rep.	Elected in 1818. Resigned to become assistant collector of the Port of New York.	Bernard Smith (New Brunswick)	Dem.-Rep.	Elected in 1818. Retired.	Henry Southard (Basking Ridge)	Dem.-Rep.	Elected in 1814. Re-elected in 1816. Re-elected in 1818. Retired.	John Linn (Monroe)	Dem.-Rep.	Elected in 1816. Re-elected in 1818. Re-elected in 1820. Died.
16th	November 4, 1819 – February 2, 1820	Joseph Bloomfield (Burlington)	Dem.-Rep.	Elected in 1816. Re-elected in 1818. Retired.	Ephraim Bateman (Cedarville)	Dem.-Rep.	Elected in 1814. Re-elected in 1816. Re-elected in 1818. Re-elected in 1820. Retired.	Vacant			Bernard Smith (New Brunswick)	Dem.-Rep.	Elected in 1818. Retired.	Henry Southard (Basking Ridge)	Dem.-Rep.	Elected in 1814. Re-elected in 1816. Re-elected in 1818. Retired.	John Linn (Monroe)	Dem.-Rep.	Elected in 1816. Re-elected in 1818. Re-elected in 1820. Died.
16th	February 2, 1820 – January 5, 1821	Joseph Bloomfield (Burlington)	Dem.-Rep.	Elected in 1816. Re-elected in 1818. Retired.	Ephraim Bateman (Cedarville)	Dem.-Rep.	Elected in 1814. Re-elected in 1816. Re-elected in 1818. Re-elected in 1820. Retired.	Charles Kinsey (Paterson)	Dem.-Rep.	Elected to finish Condit's term and seated February 16, 1820. Retired.	Bernard Smith (New Brunswick)	Dem.-Rep.	Elected in 1818. Retired.	Henry Southard (Basking Ridge)	Dem.-Rep.	Elected in 1814. Re-elected in 1816. Re-elected in 1818. Retired.	John Linn (Monroe)	Dem.-Rep.	Elected in 1816. Re-elected in 1818. Re-elected in 1820. Died.
16th	January 5, 1821 – March 3, 1821	Joseph Bloomfield (Burlington)	Dem.-Rep.	Elected in 1816. Re-elected in 1818. Retired.	Ephraim Bateman (Cedarville)	Dem.-Rep.	Elected in 1814. Re-elected in 1816. Re-elected in 1818. Re-elected in 1820. Retired.	Charles Kinsey (Paterson)	Dem.-Rep.	Elected to finish Condit's term and seated February 16, 1820. Retired.	Bernard Smith (New Brunswick)	Dem.-Rep.	Elected in 1818. Retired.	Henry Southard (Basking Ridge)	Dem.-Rep.	Elected in 1814. Re-elected in 1816. Re-elected in 1818. Retired.	Vacant		
17th	March 4, 1821 – December 3, 1821	George Cassedy (Hackensack)	Dem.-Rep. (Note: Supported the Jackson faction in the 1824 United States presidential election.)	Elected in 1820. Re-elected in 1822. Re-elected in 1824. Lost re-election.	Ephraim Bateman (Cedarville)	Dem.-Rep.	Elected in 1814. Re-elected in 1816. Re-elected in 1818. Re-elected in 1820. Retired.	George Holcombe (Allentown)	Dem.-Rep.	Elected in 1820. Re-elected in 1822. Re-elected in 1824. Re-elected in 1826. Died.	James Matlack (Woodbury)	Dem.-Rep. (Note: Supported the Adams-Clay faction in the 1824 United States presidential election.)	Elected in 1820. Re-elected in 1822. Retired.	Samuel Swan (Somerville)	Dem.-Rep.	Elected in 1820. Re-elected in 1822. Re-elected in 1824. Re-elected in 1826. Re-elected in 1828. Retired.	Vacant		
17th	December 3, 1821 – March 3, 1823	George Cassedy (Hackensack)	Dem.-Rep.	Elected in 1820. Re-elected in 1822. Re-elected in 1824. Lost re-election.	Ephraim Bateman (Cedarville)	Dem.-Rep.	Elected in 1814. Re-elected in 1816. Re-elected in 1818. Re-elected in 1820. Retired.	George Holcombe (Allentown)	Dem.-Rep.	Elected in 1820. Re-elected in 1822. Re-elected in 1824. Re-elected in 1826. Died.	James Matlack (Woodbury)	Dem.-Rep.	Elected in 1820. Re-elected in 1822. Retired.	Samuel Swan (Somerville)	Dem.-Rep.	Elected in 1820. Re-elected in 1822. Re-elected in 1824. Re-elected in 1826. Re-elected in 1828. Retired.	Lewis Condict (Morristown)	Dem.-Rep.	Elected October 8, 1821 to finish Linn's term and seated December 3, 1821. Re-elected in 1822. Re-elected in 1824. Re-elected in 1826. Re-elected in 1828. Re-elected in 1830. Retired.
18th	March 4, 1823 – March 3, 1825	George Cassedy (Hackensack)	Dem.-Rep.	Elected in 1820. Re-elected in 1822. Re-elected in 1824. Lost re-election.	Daniel Garrison (Salem)	Dem.-Rep.	Elected in 1822. Re-elected in 1824. Lost re-election.	George Holcombe (Allentown)	Dem.-Rep.	Elected in 1820. Re-elected in 1822. Re-elected in 1824. Re-elected in 1826. Died.	James Matlack (Woodbury)	Dem.-Rep.	Elected in 1820. Re-elected in 1822. Retired.	Samuel Swan (Somerville)	Dem.-Rep.	Elected in 1820. Re-elected in 1822. Re-elected in 1824. Re-elected in 1826. Re-elected in 1828. Retired.	Lewis Condict (Morristown)	Dem.-Rep.	Elected October 8, 1821 to finish Linn's term and seated December 3, 1821. Re-elected in 1822. Re-elected in 1824. Re-elected in 1826. Re-elected in 1828. Re-elected in 1830. Retired.
19th	March 4, 1825 – March 3, 1827	George Cassedy (Hackensack)	Jack.	Elected in 1820. Re-elected in 1822. Re-elected in 1824. Lost re-election.	Daniel Garrison (Salem)	Jack.	Elected in 1822. Re-elected in 1824. Lost re-election.	George Holcombe (Allentown)	Jack.	Elected in 1820. Re-elected in 1822. Re-elected in 1824. Re-elected in 1826. Died.	Ebenezer Tucker (Tuckerton)	Anti-Jack.	Elected in 1824. Re-elected in 1826. Retired.	Samuel Swan (Somerville)	Anti-Jack.	Elected in 1820. Re-elected in 1822. Re-elected in 1824. Re-elected in 1826. Re-elected in 1828. Retired.	Lewis Condict (Morristown)	Anti-Jack.	Elected October 8, 1821 to finish Linn's term and seated December 3, 1821. Re-elected in 1822. Re-elected in 1824. Re-elected in 1826. Re-elected in 1828. Re-elected in 1830. Retired.
20th	March 4, 1827 – January 14, 1828	Isaac Pierson (Orange)	Anti-Jack.	Elected in 1826. Re-elected in 1828. Lost re-election.	Hedge Thompson (Salem)	Anti-Jack.	Elected in 1826. Died.	George Holcombe (Allentown)	Jack.	Elected in 1820. Re-elected in 1822. Re-elected in 1824. Re-elected in 1826. Died.	Ebenezer Tucker (Tuckerton)	Anti-Jack.	Elected in 1824. Re-elected in 1826. Retired.	Samuel Swan (Somerville)	Anti-Jack.	Elected in 1820. Re-elected in 1822. Re-elected in 1824. Re-elected in 1826. Re-elected in 1828. Retired.	Lewis Condict (Morristown)	Anti-Jack.	Elected October 8, 1821 to finish Linn's term and seated December 3, 1821. Re-elected in 1822. Re-elected in 1824. Re-elected in 1826. Re-elected in 1828. Re-elected in 1830. Retired.
20th	January 14, 1828 – July 23, 1828	Isaac Pierson (Orange)	Anti-Jack.	Elected in 1826. Re-elected in 1828. Lost re-election.	Hedge Thompson (Salem)	Anti-Jack.	Elected in 1826. Died.	Vacant			Ebenezer Tucker (Tuckerton)	Anti-Jack.	Elected in 1824. Re-elected in 1826. Retired.	Samuel Swan (Somerville)	Anti-Jack.	Elected in 1820. Re-elected in 1822. Re-elected in 1824. Re-elected in 1826. Re-elected in 1828. Retired.	Lewis Condict (Morristown)	Anti-Jack.	Elected October 8, 1821 to finish Linn's term and seated December 3, 1821. Re-elected in 1822. Re-elected in 1824. Re-elected in 1826. Re-elected in 1828. Re-elected in 1830. Retired.
20th	July 23, 1828 – December 1, 1828	Isaac Pierson (Orange)	Anti-Jack.	Elected in 1826. Re-elected in 1828. Lost re-election.	Vacant			Vacant			Ebenezer Tucker (Tuckerton)	Anti-Jack.	Elected in 1824. Re-elected in 1826. Retired.	Samuel Swan (Somerville)	Anti-Jack.	Elected in 1820. Re-elected in 1822. Re-elected in 1824. Re-elected in 1826. Re-elected in 1828. Retired.	Lewis Condict (Morristown)	Anti-Jack.	Elected October 8, 1821 to finish Linn's term and seated December 3, 1821. Re-elected in 1822. Re-elected in 1824. Re-elected in 1826. Re-elected in 1828. Re-elected in 1830. Retired.
20th	December 1, 1828 – March 3, 1829	Isaac Pierson (Orange)	Anti-Jack.	Elected in 1826. Re-elected in 1828. Lost re-election.	Thomas Sinnickson (Salem)	Anti-Jack.	Elected November 4, 1828 only to finish Thompson's term and seated December 1, 1828. Was not a candidate to the next term.	James F. Randolph (New Brunswick)	Anti-Jack.	Elected November 4, 1828 to finish Holcombe's term and seated December 1, 1828. Also elected the same day to the next term. Re-elected in 1830. Retired.	Ebenezer Tucker (Tuckerton)	Anti-Jack.	Elected in 1824. Re-elected in 1826. Retired.	Samuel Swan (Somerville)	Anti-Jack.	Elected in 1820. Re-elected in 1822. Re-elected in 1824. Re-elected in 1826. Re-elected in 1828. Retired.	Lewis Condict (Morristown)	Anti-Jack.	Elected October 8, 1821 to finish Linn's term and seated December 3, 1821. Re-elected in 1822. Re-elected in 1824. Re-elected in 1826. Re-elected in 1828. Re-elected in 1830. Retired.
21st	March 4, 1829 – March 3, 1831	Isaac Pierson (Orange)	Anti-Jack.	Elected in 1826. Re-elected in 1828. Lost re-election.	Richard M. Cooper (Camden)	Anti-Jack.	Elected in 1828. Re-elected in 1830. Retired.	James F. Randolph (New Brunswick)	Anti-Jack.	Elected November 4, 1828 to finish Holcombe's term and seated December 1, 1828. Also elected the same day to the next term. Re-elected in 1830. Retired.	Thomas H. Hughes (Cold Spring)	Anti-Jack.	Elected in 1828. Re-elected in 1830. Retired.	Samuel Swan (Somerville)	Anti-Jack.	Elected in 1820. Re-elected in 1822. Re-elected in 1824. Re-elected in 1826. Re-elected in 1828. Retired.	Lewis Condict (Morristown)	Anti-Jack.	Elected October 8, 1821 to finish Linn's term and seated December 3, 1821. Re-elected in 1822. Re-elected in 1824. Re-elected in 1826. Re-elected in 1828. Re-elected in 1830. Retired.
22nd	March 4, 1831 – March 3, 1833	Silas Condit (Newark)	Anti-Jack.	Elected in 1830. Retired.	Richard M. Cooper (Camden)	Anti-Jack.	Elected in 1828. Re-elected in 1830. Retired.	James F. Randolph (New Brunswick)	Anti-Jack.	Elected November 4, 1828 to finish Holcombe's term and seated December 1, 1828. Also elected the same day to the next term. Re-elected in 1830. Retired.	Thomas H. Hughes (Cold Spring)	Anti-Jack.	Elected in 1828. Re-elected in 1830. Retired.	Isaac Southard (Somerville)	Anti-Jack.	Elected in 1830. Lost re-election.	Lewis Condict (Morristown)	Anti-Jack.	Elected October 8, 1821 to finish Linn's term and seated December 3, 1821. Re-elected in 1822. Re-elected in 1824. Re-elected in 1826. Re-elected in 1828. Re-elected in 1830. Retired.
23rd	March 4, 1833 – March 3, 1835	Philemon Dickerson (Paterson)	Jack.	Elected in 1832. Re-elected in 1834. Resigned to become Governor of New Jersey.	Samuel Fowler (Hamburg)	Jack.	Elected in 1832. Re-elected in 1834. Retired.	Thomas Lee (Port Elizabeth)	Jack.	Elected in 1832. Re-elected in 1834. Retired.	James Parker (Perth Amboy)	Jack.	Elected in 1832. Re-elected in 1834. Retired.	Ferdinand S. Schenck (Six Mile Run)	Jack.	Elected in 1832. Re-elected in 1834. Retired.	William N. Shinn (Mount Holly)	Jack.	Elected in 1832. Re-elected in 1834. Retired.
24th	March 4, 1835 – November 3, 1836	Philemon Dickerson (Paterson)	Jack.	Elected in 1832. Re-elected in 1834. Resigned to become Governor of New Jersey.	Samuel Fowler (Hamburg)	Jack.	Elected in 1832. Re-elected in 1834. Retired.	Thomas Lee (Port Elizabeth)	Jack.	Elected in 1832. Re-elected in 1834. Retired.	James Parker (Perth Amboy)	Jack.	Elected in 1832. Re-elected in 1834. Retired.	Ferdinand S. Schenck (Six Mile Run)	Jack.	Elected in 1832. Re-elected in 1834. Retired.	William N. Shinn (Mount Holly)	Jack.	Elected in 1832. Re-elected in 1834. Retired.
24th	November 3, 1836 – December 5, 1836	Vacant			Samuel Fowler (Hamburg)	Jack.	Elected in 1832. Re-elected in 1834. Retired.	Thomas Lee (Port Elizabeth)	Jack.	Elected in 1832. Re-elected in 1834. Retired.	James Parker (Perth Amboy)	Jack.	Elected in 1832. Re-elected in 1834. Retired.	Ferdinand S. Schenck (Six Mile Run)	Jack.	Elected in 1832. Re-elected in 1834. Retired.	William N. Shinn (Mount Holly)	Jack.	Elected in 1832. Re-elected in 1834. Retired.
24th	December 5, 1836 – March 3, 1837	William Chetwood (Elzabethtown)	Jack.	Elected November 15–16, 1836 to finish Dickerson's term and seated December 5, 1836. Did not run for the next term.	Samuel Fowler (Hamburg)	Jack.	Elected in 1832. Re-elected in 1834. Retired.	Thomas Lee (Port Elizabeth)	Jack.	Elected in 1832. Re-elected in 1834. Retired.	James Parker (Perth Amboy)	Jack.	Elected in 1832. Re-elected in 1834. Retired.	Ferdinand S. Schenck (Six Mile Run)	Jack.	Elected in 1832. Re-elected in 1834. Retired.	William N. Shinn (Mount Holly)	Jack.	Elected in 1832. Re-elected in 1834. Retired.
25th	March 4, 1837 – March 3, 1839	John B. Aycrigg (Hackensack)	Whig	Elected in 1836. Re-elected, but not permitted to qualify. (Note: See Broad Seal War)	William Halstead (Trenton)	Whig	Elected in 1836. Re-elected, but the House declined to seat him.	John P.B. Maxwell (Belvidere)	Whig	Elected in 1836. Re-elected, but the House declined to seat him.	Joseph F. Randolph (New Brunswick)	Whig	Elected in 1836. Re-elected in 1838. Re-elected in 1840. Retired.	Charles C. Stratton (Swedesboro)	Whig	Elected in 1836. Re-elected, but the House declined to seat him.	Thomas J. Yorke (Salem)	Whig	Elected in 1836. Re-elected, but the House declined to seat him.
26th	March 4, 1839 – March 3, 1841	Philemon Dickerson (Paterson)	Dem.	Elected in 1838. Lost re-election.	William R. Cooper (Swedesboro)	Dem.	Elected in 1838. Retired.	Joseph Kille (Salem)	Dem.	Elected in 1838. Retired.	Joseph F. Randolph (New Brunswick)	Whig	Elected in 1836. Re-elected in 1838. Re-elected in 1840. Retired.	Daniel B. Ryall (Freehold)	Dem.	Elected in 1838. Retired.	Peter D. Vroom (Somerville)	Dem.	Elected in 1838. Lost re-election.
27th	March 4, 1841 – March 3, 1843	John B. Aycrigg (Paramus)	Whig	Elected in 1840. Retired.	William Halstead (Trenton)	Whig	Elected in 1840. Retired.	John P.B. Maxwell (Belvidere)	Whig	Elected in 1840. Retired.	Joseph F. Randolph (New Brunswick)	Whig	Elected in 1836. Re-elected in 1838. Re-elected in 1840. Retired.	Charles C. Stratton (Swedesboro)	Whig	Elected in 1840. Retired.	Thomas J. Yorke (Salem)	Whig	Elected in 1840. Retired.
