= Henry Southard =

American politician

Henry Southard (October 7, 1747 – May 22, 1842) was a United States representative from the state of New Jersey.

Southard was born in Hempstead, Long Island, New York. He moved with his parents to the Basking Ridge section of Bernards Township, New Jersey in 1755, where he attended the common schools and worked on a farm. Later, Southard served as a private and later as wagon master during the American Revolution. After the war, he engaged in agriculture, before serving as a Justice of the Peace from 1787 to 1792. Later, he served as a member of the New Jersey General Assembly, from 1797 to 1799 and again in 1811. He was elected as a Democratic-Republican to the 7th United States Congress and to the four succeeding Congresses, where he served from March 4, 1801 to March 3, 1811. During the 11th Congress, Southard was Chairman of the Committee on Revisal and Unfinished Business. He was later elected to the 14th, 15th, and 16th Congresses, serving from March 4, 1815 to March 3, 1821. After leaving Congress for good, Southard returned to farming. He died in Basking Ridge in Somerset County, New Jersey, and was interred in Basking Ridge Cemetery.

Henry Southard was the father of Isaac Southard and Samuel Lewis Southard.

U.S. House of Representatives
Preceded by Mark Thomson	Member of the U.S. House of Representatives from New Jersey's at-large congressional district 1801–1811	Succeeded by James Morgan
Preceded by James Morgan	Member of the U.S. House of Representatives from New Jersey's at-large congressional district 1815–1821	Succeeded by James Matlack
