= James F. Randolph =

American politician

James Fitz Randolph (June 26, 1791 – January 25, 1872) was a United States representative from New Jersey. He was also the father of Theodore Fitz Randolph. Born in Middlesex County, New Jersey, he received a limited schooling.

Randolph learned the printing trade and edited the New Brunswick Fredonian 1812–1842. He served as the United States collector of internal revenue 1815-1846 and clerk of the Court of Common Pleas. He was a member of the New Jersey General Assembly in 1823 and 1824.

Randolph was elected as an Adams candidate to the Twentieth Congress to fill the vacancy caused by the death of George Holcombe. He was reelected as an Anti-Jacksonian to the Twenty-first and Twenty-second Congresses and served in office from December 1, 1828, to March 3, 1833. After Congress, he served as president of a bank in New Brunswick, New Jersey. He died in Easton, Pennsylvania in 1872 and was buried in Easton Cemetery.

U.S. House of Representatives
Preceded by George Holcombe	Member of the U.S. House of Representatives from New Jersey's at-large congressional district 1828–1833	Succeeded by James Parker
