= Hedge Thompson =

American politician

Hedge Thompson (January 28, 1780 - July 23, 1828) was a U.S. representative from New Jersey. Thompson was born in Salem, New Jersey on January 28, 1780. He graduated from the medical department of the University of Pennsylvania at Philadelphia in 1802 and practiced his profession in Salem; member of the New Jersey General Assembly in 1805; served in the New Jersey Legislative Council (now the New Jersey Senate) in 1819; appointed associate judge of Salem County, N.J., in 1815 and again in 1824; served as collector for Salem County from 1826 to 1828; elected to the Twentieth Congress and served from March 4, 1827, until his death in Salem, N.J., on July 23, 1828; interment in St. John's Protestant Episcopal Churchyard.

== See also ==
- List of members of the United States Congress who died in office (1790–1899)

U.S. House of Representatives
Preceded by Daniel Garrison	Member of the U.S. House of Representatives from New Jersey's at-large congressional district 1827–1828	Succeeded by Thomas Sinnickson
