= James Matlack =

American politician

James Matlack (January 11, 1775 – January 16, 1840) born in Woodbury, New Jersey, was a Representative from New Jersey.

January 11, 1775; attended the common schools; interested in various business enterprises; owned slaves; justice of the peace in 1803, 1808, 1813, 1816, and 1820; surrogate in 1815; chairman of the township committee; judge of the court of common pleas of Gloucester County 1806–1817; member of the board of freeholders 1812–1815, 1819–1821, and 1828; member of the New Jersey Legislative Council in 1817 and 1818; elected as a Democratic-Republican to the Seventeenth Congress and reelected as an Adams-Clay Democratic-Republican to the Eighteenth Congress (March 4, 1821 – March 3, 1825); was not a candidate for renomination in 1824; affiliated with the Whig Party when it was formed; resumed business interests; died in Woodbury, New Jersey, January 16, 1840; interment in Eglington Cemetery, Clarksboro, New Jersey.

U.S. House of Representatives
Preceded by Henry Southard	Member of the U.S. House of Representatives from New Jersey's at-large congressional district 1821–1825	Succeeded by Ebenezer Tucker
