= Thomas Sinnickson (jurist) =

American judge and politician

Thomas Sinnickson (December 13, 1786 – February 17, 1873) was an American jurist and statesman from Salem, New Jersey. He represented New Jersey in the United States House of Representatives in 1828–1829. He was a judge of the court of errors and appeals of New Jersey, and a judge of the court of common pleas for twenty years.

He was the nephew of Congressman Thomas Sinnickson (1744–1817)

He was interred at St. John's Episcopal Cemetery in Salem, New Jersey.

U.S. House of Representatives
Preceded by Hedge Thompson	Member of the U.S. House of Representatives from New Jersey's at-large congressional district December 1, 1828 – March 3, 1829	Succeeded by Various, general ticket
