= Thomas Sinnickson (merchant) =

American merchant and statesman (1744–1817)

Member of the U.S. House of Representatives from New Jersey's at-large district
- In office March 4, 1789 – March 3, 1791
- Preceded by: Seat created
- Succeeded by: Aaron Kitchell
- In office March 4, 1797 – March 4, 1799
- Preceded by: Isaac Smith
- Succeeded by: James Mott

Personal details
- Born: December 21, 1744 Salem County, New Jersey
- Died: May 15, 1817 (aged 72) Salem, New Jersey

Thomas Sinnickson (December 21, 1744 – May 15, 1817) was an American merchant and politician from Salem, New Jersey. He represented New Jersey at-large in the U.S. House in 1789–1791 and again in 1797–1799.

He was the granduncle of Clement Hall Sinnickson and uncle of Thomas Sinnickson. He was born near Salem, in Salem County, New Jersey, on December 21, 1744; completed preparatory studies; engaged in mercantile pursuits; served as captain in the Continental Army; held several local offices; member of the New Jersey General Assembly in 1777, 1782, 1784, 1785, 1787, and 1788; elected to the First Congress (March 4, 1789 – March 3, 1791); elected as a Federalist to the Fifth Congress (March 4, 1797 – March 3, 1799); died in Salem, N.J., May 15, 1817; interment in St. John's Episcopal Cemetery, in Salem.

U.S. House of Representatives
Preceded by Seat created	Member of the U.S. House of Representatives from New Jersey's at-large congressional district 1789–1791	Succeeded by Aaron Kitchell
Preceded by Isaac Smith	Member of the U.S. House of Representatives from New Jersey's at-large congressional district 1797–1799	Succeeded by James Mott
