= Aaron Kitchell =

American politician (1744–1820)

United States Senator from New Jersey
- In office March 4, 1805 – March 12, 1809
- Preceded by: Jonathan Dayton
- Succeeded by: John Condit

Member of the U.S. House of Representatives from New Jersey's 2nd district
- In office March 4, 1799 – March 3, 1801
- Preceded by: N/A
- Succeeded by: N/A

Member of the U.S. House of Representatives from New Jersey's at-large district
- In office January 29, 1795 – March 3, 1797
- Preceded by: Abraham Clark
- Succeeded by: James Henderson Imlay

Member of the U.S. House of Representatives from New Jersey's at-large district
- In office March 4, 1791 – March 3, 1793
- Preceded by: Lambert Cadwalader
- Succeeded by: Lambert Cadwalader

Member of the New Jersey General Assembly
- In office 1786–1790; 1793–1794; 1797; 1801–1804; 1809

Personal details
- Born: July 10, 1744 Hanover, Province of New Jersey, British America
- Died: June 25, 1820 (aged 75) Hanover, New Jersey, U.S.
- Resting place: Hanover Township Presbyterian Church
- Party: Democratic-Republican

Aaron Kitchell (July 10, 1744 – June 25, 1820) was a blacksmith and politician from Hanover Township, New Jersey. He represented New Jersey in both the United States House of Representatives and the Senate.

== Early life and education ==
Born in Hanover Township in the Province of New Jersey, Kitchell attended the common schools and became a blacksmith.

== Political career ==
He was a member of the New Jersey General Assembly in 1781–1782, 1784, 1786–1790, 1793–1794, 1797, 1801–1804, and 1809.

=== Congress ===
He was elected to the Second Congress (March 4, 1791 – March 3, 1793) and to the Third Congress to fill the vacancy caused by the death of Abraham Clark and was reelected to the Fourth Congress, serving from January 29, 1795, to March 3, 1797.

=== Later career ===
He resumed his former business activities and was elected to the Sixth Congress (March 4, 1799 – March 3, 1801). He was then elected as a Democratic Republican to the U.S. Senate and served from March 4, 1805, to March 12, 1809, when he resigned

=== Death and burial ===
Kitchell died in Hanover Township on June 25, 1820, and was interred there in the churchyard of the Presbyterian Church.

U.S. House of Representatives
Preceded by Abraham Clark	Member of the U.S. House of Representatives from New Jersey's at-large congressional district 1795–1797	Succeeded by James H. Imlay
Preceded by N/A	Member of the U.S. House of Representatives from New Jersey's 2nd congressional district 1799–1801	Succeeded by N/A
U.S. Senate
Preceded by Jonathan Dayton	U.S. senator (Class 2) from New Jersey; March 4, 1805 – March 12, 1809; Served alongside: John Condit, John Lambert	Succeeded by John Condit
