= Ephraim Bateman =

American politician (1780–1829)

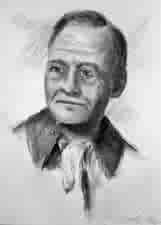

United States Senator from New Jersey
- In office November 9, 1826 – January 12, 1829
- Preceded by: Joseph McIlvaine
- Succeeded by: Mahlon Dickerson

Member of the U.S. House of Representatives from New Jersey's at-large congressional district
- In office March 4, 1815 – March 3, 1823
- Preceded by: District inactive
- Succeeded by: Daniel Garrison

Member of the New Jersey General Assembly
- In office 1808-1809; 1811; 1813

Personal details
- Born: July 9, 1780 Cedarville, New Jersey
- Died: January 28, 1829 (aged 48) Cedarville, New Jersey
- Party: National Republican

Ephraim Bateman (July 9, 1780 – January 28, 1829) was an American politician who represented New Jersey in the United States Senate from 1826 to 1829 and in the United States House of Representatives from 1815 to 1823.

== Early life and education ==
Born in Cedarville, New Jersey, an area within Lawrence Township, Cumberland County, New Jersey, Bateman attended the local schools and Nathaniel Ogden's Latin school. He apprenticed as a tailor in 1796 and taught in the local school 1799–1801. He studied medicine with a medical doctor in 1801 and at the University of Pennsylvania in 1802 and 1803 and practiced medicine in Cedarville

== Political career ==
Bateman served in the New Jersey General Assembly 1808–1809, 1811, and 1813, and was speaker in 1813. He was elected to the Fourteenth United States Congress and to the three succeeding Congresses (March 4, 1815 – March 3, 1823).

Member, New Jersey Legislative Council 1826 and served as president; elected to the United States Senate to fill the vacancy caused by the death of Joseph McIlvaine and served from November 9, 1826, to January 12, 1829, when he resigned because of failing health. His election to the Senate was contested by several members of the New Jersey Legislature and citizens, citing that Bateman, while presiding over the joint election meeting, cast the deciding vote for himself against Theodore Frelinghuysen. A select committee investigated the issue and declared the election legal.

He died in Cedarville, Cumberland County, New Jersey, aged 48, and was interred in the Old Stone Church Cemetery in Fairfield Township, Cumberland County, New Jersey.

U.S. Senate
Preceded by Joseph McIlvaine	U.S. senator (Class 1) from New Jersey; 1826–1829; Served alongside: Mahlon Dickerson	Succeeded by Mahlon Dickerson
U.S. House of Representatives
Preceded by District inactive	Member of the U.S. House of Representatives from New Jersey's at-large congressional district 1815-1823	Succeeded by Daniel Garrison
