= George Cassedy =

American politician

George Cassedy (September 16, 1783 – December 31, 1842) was a U.S. representative from New Jersey.

Born in Hackensack, New Jersey, Cassedy attended the common schools. He later studied law. He was admitted to the bar in 1809 and commenced practice in Hackensack, and became the postmaster of Hackensack from June 10, 1805, to January 1, 1806. He owned slaves.

Cassedy was elected as a Democratic-Republican to the Seventeenth Congress, reelected as a Jacksonian Democratic-Republican to the Eighteenth Congress, and reelected as a Jacksonian to the Nineteenth Congress (March 4, 1821 – March 3, 1827). He died in Hackensack, December 31, 1842, and was interred there in the First Reformed Dutch Church Cemetery.

U.S. House of Representatives
Preceded by Joseph Bloomfield	Member of the U.S. House of Representatives from New Jersey's at-large congressional district March 4, 1821 – March 3, 1827	Succeeded by Isaac Pierson
