= Daniel Garrison =

American politician

Daniel Garrison (April 3, 1782 – February 13, 1851) was a Representative from New Jersey; born in Pennsville Township, New Jersey near Salem, New Jersey.

== Early life and career ==
He pursued an academic course and engaged in agricultural pursuits. He was a member of the New Jersey General Assembly from 1806 to 1808, and was surrogate of Salem County, New Jersey from 1809 to 1823.

== Congress ==
Garrison was elected as a Jacksonian Democratic-Republican to the Eighteenth Congress and reelected as a Jacksonian to the Nineteenth Congress, serving in office from March 4, 1823 – March 3, 1827. He was not a candidate for renomination in 1826.

== Later career ==
After leaving Congress, Garrison was appointed by President Andrew Jackson as inspector of the revenue and collector of the customs at the port of Bridgeton, New Jersey, in 1834 and served until 1838.

He died in Salem on February 13, 1851, and was interred there in St. John's Episcopal Cemetery.

U.S. House of Representatives
Preceded by Ephraim Bateman	Member of the U.S. House of Representatives from New Jersey's at-large congressional district 1823–1825	Succeeded by Hedge Thompson
