= George Holcombe =

American politician (1786–1828)

George Holcombe (March 1786 – January 14, 1828) was an American medical doctor and politician who served as a United States representative from New Jersey.

== Early life and education ==
Born in what was then Amwell Township (now in part of Lambertville in Hunterdon County, New Jersey) he completed preparatory studies and graduated from Princeton College in 1805.

=== Medicine ===
He attended the medical department of the University of Pennsylvania at Philadelphia and later studied medicine in Trenton.

Holcombe was granted a license by the Medical Society of New Jersey and practiced medicine in Allentown from 1808 to 1815.

== Career ==
Holcombe held several local offices and was a member of the New Jersey General Assembly in 1815 and 1816.

=== Congress ===
He was elected as Democratic-Republican to the Seventeenth Congress, elected as a Jacksonian Democratic-Republican to the Eighteenth Congress, and reelected as a Jacksonian to the Nineteenth and Twentieth Congresses, and held office from March 4, 1821, until his death.

== Death and burial ==
He died in Allentown on January 14, 1828. Holcombe's remains were interred in the Congressional Cemetery.

== See also ==
- List of members of the United States Congress who died in office (1790–1899)

U.S. House of Representatives
Preceded by Bernard Smith	Member of the U.S. House of Representatives from New Jersey's at-large congressional district 1821–1828	Succeeded by James F. Randolph
