= Elisha Lawrence =

American politician

Chair of the Monmouth County Board of Justices and Freeholders
- In office May 1795 – May 1796
- Preceded by: Joseph Holmes
- Succeeded by: Joseph Holmes

Acting Governor of New Jersey
- In office July 25, 1790 – October 29, 1790
- Preceded by: William Livingston as Governor
- Succeeded by: William Paterson as Governor

Vice President of the New Jersey Legislative Council
- In office 1789–1792
- Governor: William Livingston; Himself; William Paterson
- Preceded by: Robert Lettis Hooper
- Succeeded by: Thomas Henderson
- In office 1795–1796
- Governor: Richard Howell
- Preceded by: Thomas Henderson
- Succeeded by: James Linn

Personal details
- Born: 1746
- Died: July 23, 1799 (aged 52–53)
- Resting place: Yellow Meeting House Cemetery
- Party: Federalist

Elisha Lawrence (1746 – July 23, 1799) was an American Federalist Party politician, who represented Monmouth County in the New Jersey Legislative Council, the precursor to the New Jersey State Senate, from 1780 through 1783, from 1789 through 1792 and in 1795. He served as Vice-President of Council from 1789 through 1792, and again in 1795. He served as acting governor of New Jersey in 1790.

== Political career ==
As Vice President of the New Jersey Legislative Council, Lawrence served as acting governor of New Jersey from July 25, 1790, to October 30, 1790, following the death of Governor William Livingston. He was succeeded as governor by William Paterson.

A resident of Upper Freehold Township, Lawrence was serving as a Justice of the Peace as early as 1788, and sat with the County Board of Justices and Freeholders, the precursor to the Board of Chosen Freeholders, the governing body of the county. He was chairman of the board from May 1795 to May 1796.

== Death ==
Lawrence is buried at the Yellow Meeting House Cemetery in Red Valley, New Jersey. The tombstone reads, “A stranger to all ambition but that of being useful, he was twice vice president of New Jersey for several years presiding judge of the pleas, and after a series of faithful and gallant services in the Revolutionary War he was appointed by his county brigadier general of the Monmouth militia of the surveyed blazing line when wars loud conflict racked the brain. Now sheltered in the realms divine he treads heavens ever-peaceful plan lead on by softer, mercy’s mildest ray while fellow warriors hail him on his way.” The bottom of the stone reads, “By indulgence of the general’s family, his companions in arms erect this tribute of affection the first day of January 1800.”

== See also ==
- List of Monmouth County Freeholder Directors
- List of governors of New Jersey
- List of sheriffs of Monmouth County, New Jersey

== Notes and references ==
Political offices
Preceded by William Livingston; Governor	Acting Governor of New Jersey; 1790	Succeeded by William Paterson; Governor
Preceded by Joseph Holmes	Monmouth County Justices & Freeholders Chairman; 1795–1796	Succeeded by Joseph Holmes
