= Robert Lettis Hooper Jr. =

American politician

Robert Lettis Hooper Jr

Vice President of the New Jersey Legislative Council
- In office 1785–1788
- Governor: William Livingston
- Preceded by: Philemon Dickinson
- Succeeded by: Elisha Lawrence

Personal details
- Born: c.1730
- Died: July 30, 1797 Trenton, New Jersey, U.S.
- Spouse(s): Margaret Biles, Elizabeth Erskine

Robert Lettis Hooper Jr (c.1730 – July 30, 1797) was a soldier in the American Revolutionary War, later a member of the New Jersey Legislative Council, of which he was Vice President.

== Early life ==
Hooper was born about 1730 and was the third in succession to bear that name. His grandfather, Robert Lettis Hooper, had been Chief Justice of the New Jersey Supreme Court, and a member of the New Jersey General Assembly, among other political offices. His great-grandfather Daniel Hooper, a native of Barbados, was a judge in Elizabethtown and Newark, and was of the East New Jersey Provincial Council.

A miller, he was later a merchant in Philadelphia, but owing to financial problems he closed his business.

Traveling west, Hooper visited with Sir William Johnson in June, 1765. Afterwards he engaged in surveying for the proposed Colony of Vandalia, and was an applicant for its Surveyor General if a government was established. Although this position never materialized, it led to Hooper being appointed by Governor William Franklin to report on the country he had surveyed.

== Revolutionary activity ==
During the 1770s, Hooper Jr. lived at various times in Philadelphia, Northampton County, Pennsylvania, and Trenton, New Jersey. While in Philadelphia, he observed troops training in August 1775 and joined.

Relocating to Northampton County, Hooper was made a Deputy Quartermaster General with the rank of colonel. His department covered Northampton, Philadelphia, Bucks and Berks Counties in Pennsylvania, and Sussex County, New Jersey. Hooper made his headquarters in Easton, and made his residence at Saucon Township.

In 1777, Hooper objected to the form of an oath of allegiance and refused to take the oath, and influenced others to refuse as well. This resulted in suspicion that Hooper held Loyalist sympathies. In early 1778, with different language in the form of oath, Hooper subscribed to it, and the suspicion died.

On July 15, 1780, Congress, found military "posts without troops there stationed and in the Continental service" burdensome and expensive, and reorganized the Quartermaster's Department, legislating Hooper out of office effective August 1.

== Later years ==
After the American Revolution, Hooper became an ironmaster at Ringwood, New Jersey, by virtue of his marriage to the widow of the previous ironmaster. During this period he relocated to Trenton.

On September 24, 1783, Hooper Jr was elected an honorary member of the New Jersey Society of the Cincinnati, along with William Livingston, Elias Boudinot and Thomas Henderson. He was also active in Freemasonry, having been the first Deputy Grand Master of the Grand Lodge of New Jersey of Ancient Free and Accepted Masons, and was the first Senior Warden of Trenton Lodge No. 5.

Hooper was a member of Union Fire Company, of Trenton.

Hooper died at his estate in Belleville, New Jersey on July 30, 1797.

== Political activity ==
Robert Lettis Hooper Jr served as a Justice of the Peace for Hunterdon County, of which Trenton was a part at the time, and was a judge of the Hunterdon County Court of Common Pleas in 1782, 1787 and 1792.

In 1785, he was elected from Hunterdon County a member of the New Jersey Legislative Council, the upper house of the New Jersey Legislature, serving three, one year terms. He served as vice president for the entire three years.

== Family ==
Hooper was married to Margaret Biles, who was living as late as 1779. In 1781 he married Mrs. Elizabeth Erskine, the widow of Robert Erskine, F. R. S., Geographer and Surveyor General of the Continental Army and ironmaster at Ringwood. The second Mrs. Hooper died in 1796.

Hooper left no surviving children. One son, Robert Lettis Hooper, was born on July 2, 1788, but died in 1790, being buried at Christ Church, Philadelphia, on September 3, 1790. Hooper's sister was Isabella Hooper Johnston.
