= Robert Hooper =

Robert, Bob or Bobby Hooper may refer to:

- J. Robert Hooper (1936–2008), member of the Maryland Senate
- Robert Hooper (swimmer) (1917–2021), Canadian freestyle swimmer
- Robert Hooper (physician) (1773–1835), English physician and medical writer
- Bob Hooper (1922–1980), Canadian-born pitcher in Major League Baseball
- Bobby Hooper (basketball) (1946–2024), American basketball player
- Robert Lettis Hooper (died 1738/39), chief justice of the New Jersey Supreme Court
- Robert William Hooper (1810–1885), Boston physician
- Robert Lettis Hooper Jr. (c.1730–1797), American Revolutionary War soldier and New Jersey politician
- Robert Hooper (Vermont politician)
- Robert Hooper (master) (1563–1639), English academic, master of Balliol College, Oxford
