= Vice-President of Council =

The Vice-President of Council of the New Jersey Legislature would succeed the Governor (who was the President of the Council) if a vacancy occurred in that office.

== List of past vice-presidents of Council ==
The following is a list of past vice-presidents of the New Jersey Council from the adoption of the 1776 State Constitution.

- 1776-81: John Stevens, Hunterdon
- 1782: John Cox, Burlington
- 1783-84: Philemon Dickinson, Hunterdon
- 1785-88: Robert Lettis Hooper, Hunterdon
- 1789-92: Elisha Lawrence, Monmouth (acting Governor 1790)
- 1793-94: Thomas Henderson, Monmouth (acting Governor 1793 & 1794)
- 1795: Elisha Lawrence, Monmouth
- 1796-97: James Linn, Somerset
- 1798-1800: George Anderson, Burlington
- 1801-04: John Lambert, Hunterdon (acting Governor 1802-03)
- 1805: Thomas Little, Monmouth
- 1806: George Anderson, Burlington
- 1807: Ebenezer Elmer, Cumberland
- 1808: Ebenezer Seeley, Cumberland
- 1809: Thomas Ward, Essex
- 1810-11: Charles Clark, Essex (acting Governor 1812)
- 1812: James Schureman, Middlesex
- 1813: Charles Clark, Essex
- 1814-15: William Kennedy, Sussex (acting Governor 1815)
- 1816-22: Jesse Upson, Morris
- 1823-25: Peter J. Stryker, Somerset
- 1826: Ephraim Bateman, Cumberland
- 1827: Silas Cook, Morris
- 1828: Caleb Newbold, Burlington
- 1829-30: Edward Condict, Morris
- 1831-32: Elias P. Seeley, Cumberland (acting Governor 1833)
- 1833: Mahlon Dickerson, Morris
- 1834: Jehu Patterson, Monmouth
- 1835: Charles Sitgreaves, Warren
- 1836: Jeptha P. Munn, Morris
- 1837-38: Andrew Parsons, Passaic
- 1839-40: Joseph Porter, Gloucester
- 1841: John Cassedy, Bergen
- 1842: William Chetwood, Essex
- 1843-44: James Patterson, Monmouth
- (1844 elections were for the new New Jersey Senate that met in January 1845)
