= Upper Freehold Baptist Meeting =

Historic church in New Jersey, United States

- U.S. National Register of Historic Places
- New Jersey Register of Historic Places
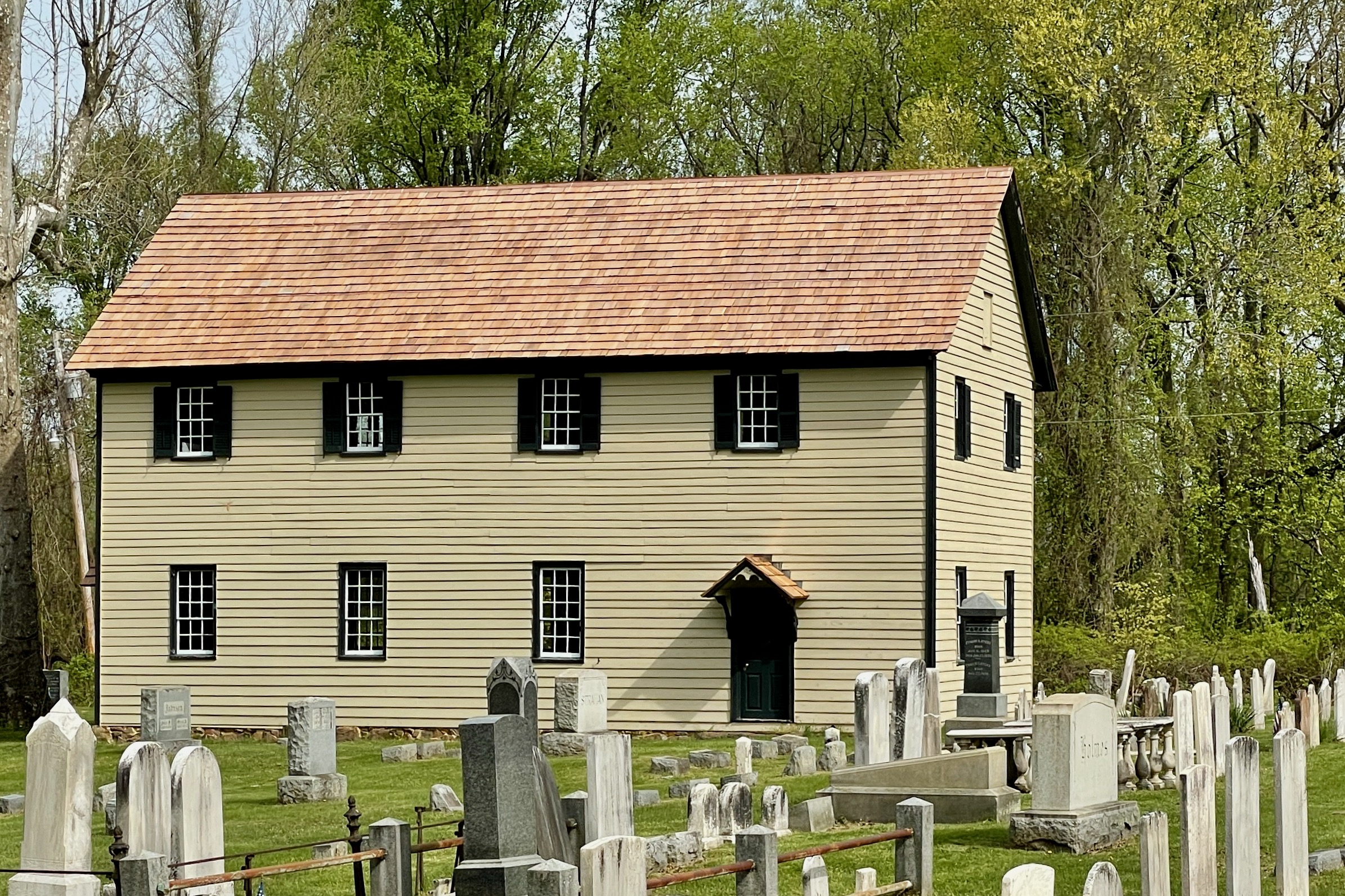
- Ye Olde Yellow Meeting House

- Location within Monmouth County, New Jersey Location within New Jersey Location within the United States
- Location: Yellow Meetinghouse and Red Valley roads, Upper Freehold Township, New Jersey
- Nearest city: Imlaystown, New Jersey
- Coordinates: 40°10′8″N 74°28′28″W
- Area: 25 acres (10 ha)
- Built: 1720
- NRHP reference No.: 75001147
- NJRHP No.: 2069

Significant dates
- Added to NRHP: April 21, 1975
- Designated NJRHP: March 25, 1975

Upper Freehold Baptist Meeting, also known as Ye Olde Yellow Meeting House, is a historic church located on Yellow Meetinghouse and Red Valley roads in the Red Valley section of Upper Freehold Township near Imlaystown in Monmouth County, New Jersey. It is the oldest Baptist meetinghouse in the state. It was added to the National Register of Historic Places on April 21, 1975 for its significance in religion and exploration/settlement.

== History ==
An earlier building for the area Baptists was erected in 1720 on land donated by Thomas and Rachel Salter. The current meeting house was built in 1737. It is oriented so that the gable ends are facing due east and west, to maximize sunlight on the southern side. The first resident minister for the congregation was David Jones (1736–1820). The parsonage was built c. 1830.

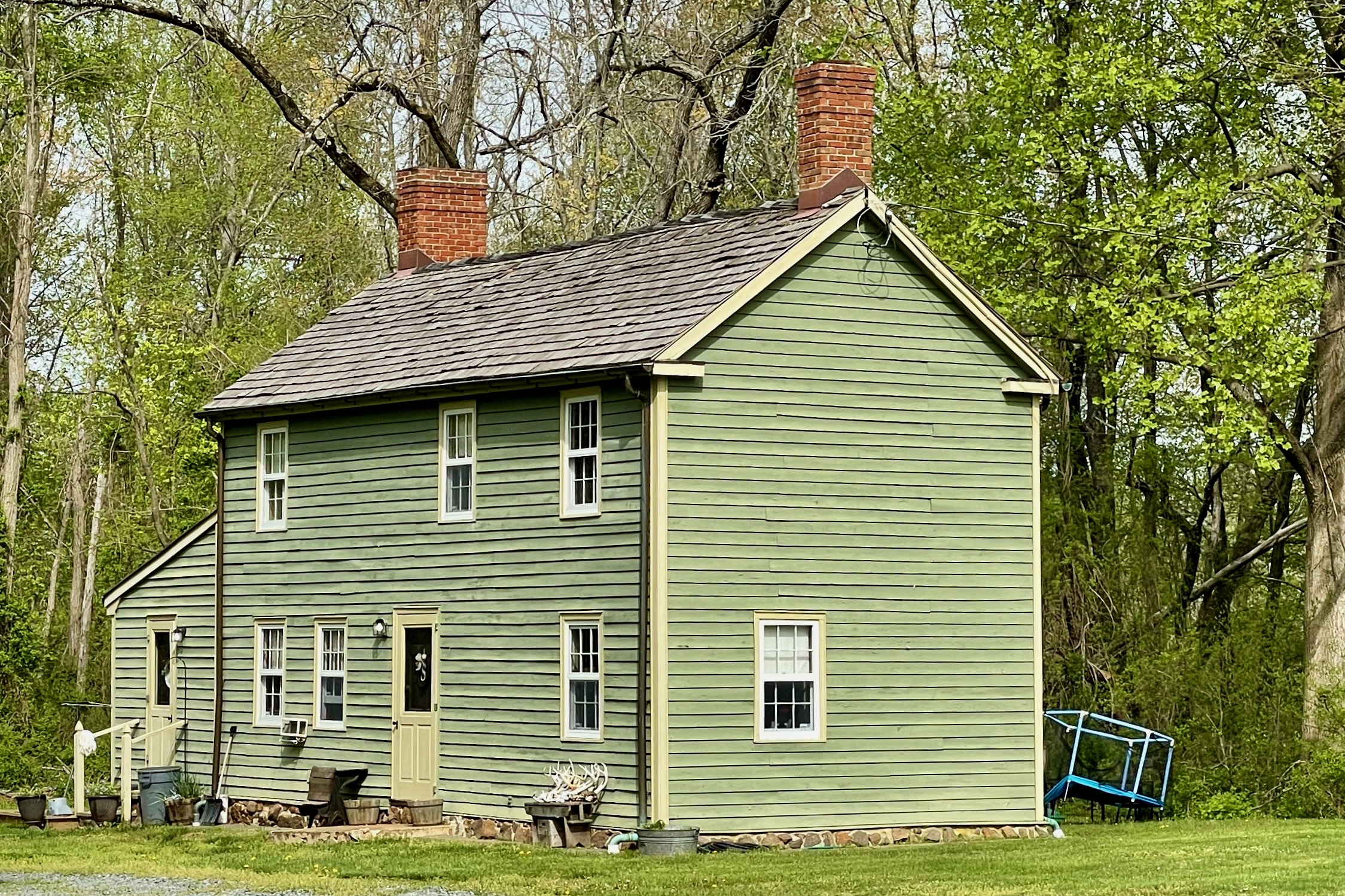
Parsonage

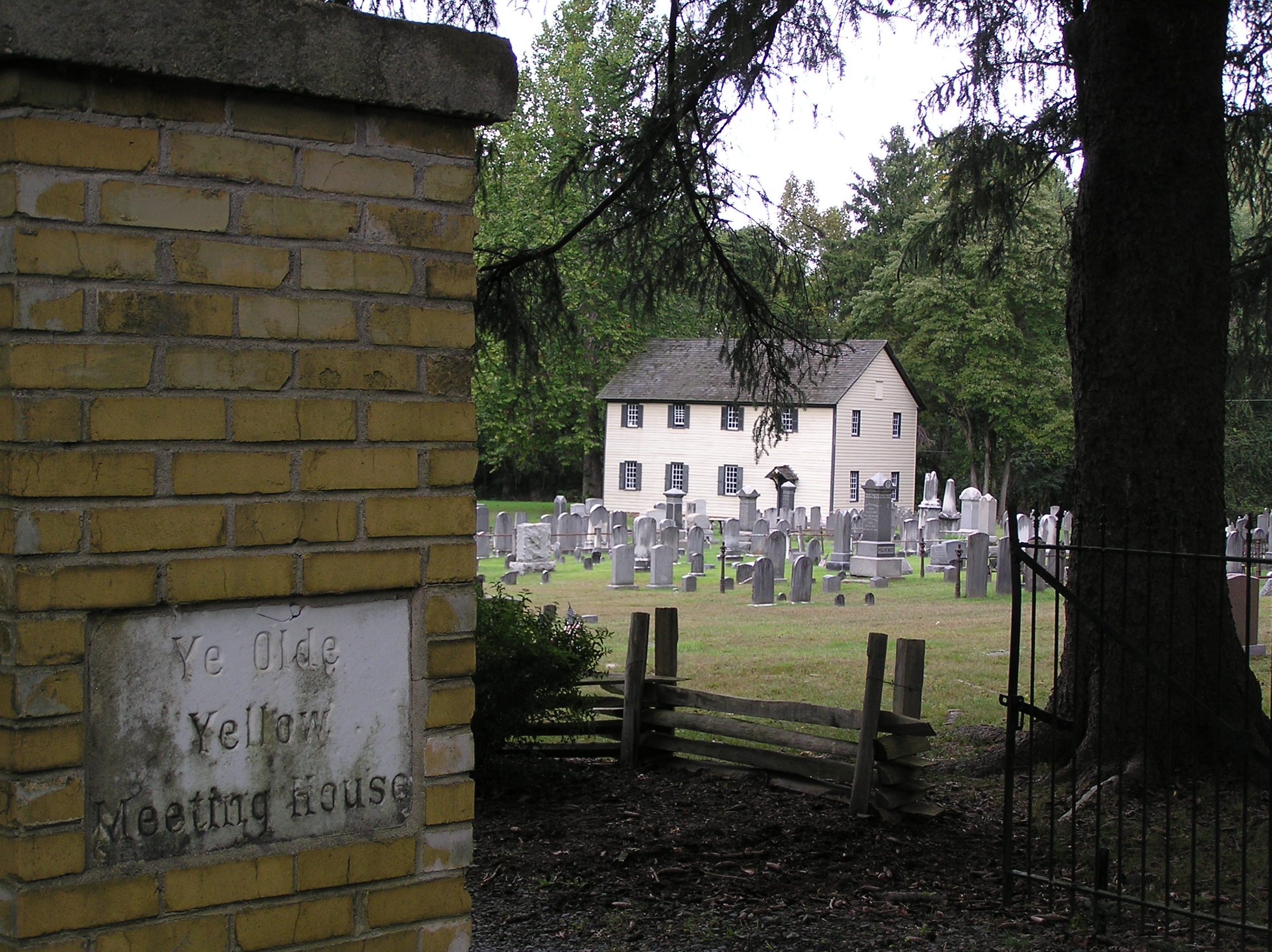
Entrance gate, cemetery, and meeting house

== Cemetery ==
The oldest dated grave in the Yellow Meeting House Cemetery is Salter's son, John, who died August 29, 1723. The 5-acre (2.0 ha) cemetery has about two hundred graves.

=== Notable burials ===
- James Cox (1753–1810), member of the United States House of Representatives (from New Jersey)
- Joseph Holmes (1736-1809), member of the New Jersey Legislative Council
- Elisha Lawrence (1746–1799), Federalist Party politician and acting governor of New Jersey in 1790

== See also ==
- National Register of Historic Places listings in Monmouth County, New Jersey
- List of the oldest buildings in New Jersey
