= Daniel Hooper =

Daniel Hooper may refer to:

- Dan Hooper (born 1976), American cosmologist and particle physicist
- Swampy (Daniel Hooper, born 1973), environmental activist
- Daniel Hooper (New Jersey judge) (died 1701), judge and politician in New Jersey
- Danny Hooper (1893–1973), English footballer
