= Joseph Holmes (New Jersey politician) =

American politician (1736–1809)

Chair of the Monmouth County Board of Justices and Freeholders
- In office May 1796 – May 1797
- Preceded by: Elisha Lawrence
- Succeeded by: Hendrick Hendrickson
- In office May 1794 – May 1795
- Preceded by: Hendrick Hendrickson
- Succeeded by: Elisha Lawrence

Member of the New Jersey Legislative Council
- In office 1777–1779

Member of the Monmouth County Board of Justices and Freeholders
- In office 1794–1803
- In office 1786–1787
- In office May 1782 – May 1783
- In office 1768 – May 1776

Personal details
- Born: December 31, 1736
- Died: August 31, 1809 (aged 72)
- Resting place: Ye Olde Yellow Meeting House

Joseph Holmes (December 31, 1736 – August 31, 1809) was an American politician, who served on the New Jersey Legislative Council, the precursor to the New Jersey Senate, between 1777 and 1779.

== Biography ==
A resident of Upper Freehold Township, Monmouth County, Holmes was first elected to the County Board of Justices and Freeholders, the precursor to the Board of Chosen Freeholders, in 1768, and served until May 1776. He again served from May 1782 to May 1783, from 1786 to 1787, and from 1794 to 1803. He was chairman of the board from May 1794 to May 1795, and from May 1796 to May 1797. He later served on the Upper Freehold Township Committee.

== Death ==
Holmes died on August 31, 1809, and is buried in the Olde Yellow Meeting House Yard, Upper Freehold Township.

== See also ==
- List of Monmouth County Freeholder Directors

== Notes and references ==
Political offices
Preceded by Hendrick Hendrickson	Monmouth County Justices & Freeholders Chairman; 1794–1795	Succeeded by Elisha Lawrence
Preceded by Elisha Lawrence	Monmouth County Justices & Freeholders Chairman; 1796–1797	Succeeded by Hendrick Hendrickson
