= Thomas Ward (New Jersey politician) =

American politician from New Jersey (ca. 1759-1842)

Member of the United States House of Representatives from New Jersey
- In office March 4, 1815 – March 3, 1817
- Constituency: Northern district (1813); At-large district (1814-1817)

15th Vice-President of Council
- In office 1809
- Preceded by: Ebenezer Seeley
- Succeeded by: Charles Clark

Member of the New Jersey Legislative Council
- In office 1808–1809

Judge of Essex County Court
- In office 1804–1809

Sheriff of Essex County
- In office 1797

Personal details
- Born: 1759 Newark, New Jersey, US
- Died: March 4, 1842 (aged 82–83)
- Resting place: First Presbyterian Church Cemetery, Newark, New Jersey, US
- Party: Democratic-Republican

Military service
- Allegiance: United States
- Branch/service: Legion of the United States
- Years of service: 1794
- Rank: Major
- Unit: New Jersey State Militia
- Battles/wars: Whiskey Rebellion

Thomas Ward (ca. 1759 - March 4, 1842) represented New Jersey's 1st congressional district in the United States House of Representatives from 1813 to 1817.

Born in Newark, New Jersey, Ward completed preparatory studies. He studied law, and was admitted to the bar and commenced practice in Newark, New Jersey. He served as captain and major in the state militia during the Whiskey Rebellion in 1794. He served as Sheriff of Essex County, New Jersey, in 1797.

Ward was elected one of the judges of the Essex County Court in 1804 and reelected in 1809. He served as member of the New Jersey Legislative Council in 1808 and 1809 serving as Vice-President of Council in the latter year.

Ward was elected as a Democratic-Republican to the Thirteenth and Fourteenth Congresses (March 4, 1813 – March 3, 1817). He was a general and senior officer of the New Jersey Cavalry at the time of his death in Newark, New Jersey, March 4, 1842. He was interred in the First Presbyterian Church Cemetery in Newark.

Ward purchased a number of properties in Otsego and St. Lawrence counties in New York from James Fenimore Cooper. The former Ward estate in Newark is the site of St. Patrick's Pro-Cathedral.

U.S. House of Representatives
| Preceded by Jacob Hufty | Member of the U.S. House of Representatives from New Jersey's at-large congressional district 1813–1817 | Succeeded by John Linn |
