= Franklin Davenport =

American politician (1755–1832)

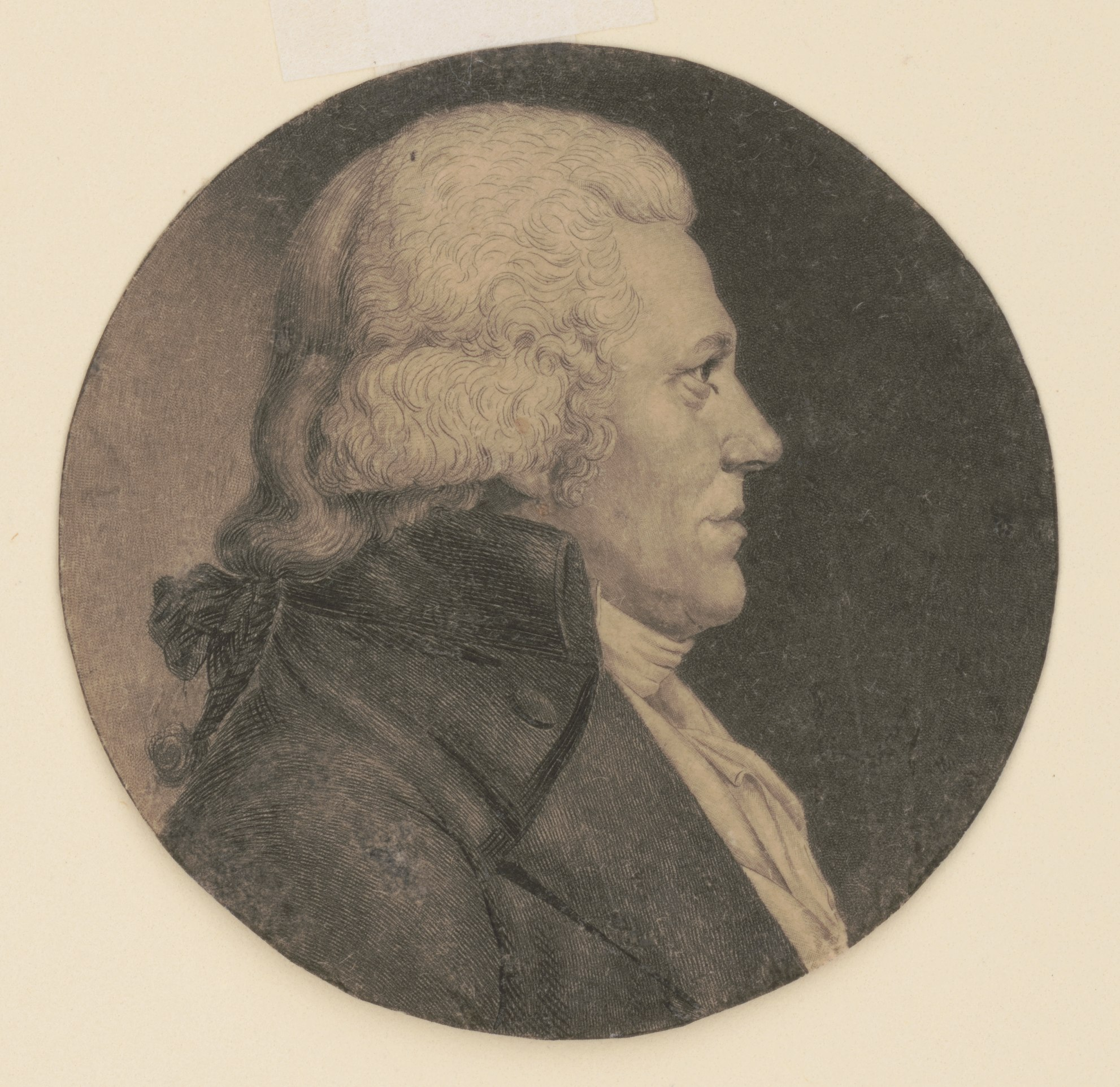
- Engraving by Charles Balthazar Julien Févret de Saint-Mémin, c. 1798

Member of the U.S. House of Representatives from New Jersey's 5th district
- In office March 4, 1799 – March 3, 1801
- Preceded by: District created
- Succeeded by: William Wright

United States Senator from New Jersey
- In office December 5, 1798 – March 3, 1799
- Appointed by: Richard Howell
- Preceded by: John Rutherfurd
- Succeeded by: James Schureman

Member of the New Jersey General Assembly
- In office 1786-1789

Personal details
- Born: September 1755 Philadelphia, Province of Pennsylvania, British America
- Died: July 27, 1832 (aged 76) Woodbury, New Jersey, U.S.
- Party: Federalist

Franklin Davenport (September 1755 – July 27, 1832) was a Federalist Party United States Senator and US Representative from New Jersey.

== Biography ==
Davenport was born in Philadelphia in the Province of Pennsylvania and his uncle was Benjamin Franklin. He received an academic education; studied law in Burlington, New Jersey; admitted to the New Jersey State Bar in 1776 and commenced practice in Gloucester City, New Jersey. He was the clerk of Gloucester County Court in 1776; during the American Revolutionary War he enlisted as a private in the New Jersey Militia, later becoming brigade major, then brigade quartermaster, and in 1778 assistant quartermaster for Gloucester County. He was appointed colonel in the New Jersey Militia in 1779 and subsequently major general, which rank he held until his death; prosecutor of pleas in 1777.

=== New Jersey ===
He moved to Woodbury, New Jersey in 1781 and continued the practice of law; appointed first surrogate of Gloucester County in 1785; member of the New Jersey General Assembly from 1786 to 1789; colonel in the New Jersey Line during the Whiskey Insurrection of 1794; appointed brigadier general of Gloucester County Militia in 1796. As a Representative-elect he was appointed to the United States Senate as a Federalist to fill the vacancy caused by the resignation of John Rutherfurd, and served from December 5, 1798, to March 3, 1799, when a successor was elected and qualified and he took his seat in the House.

=== Elected to the Congress ===
He was elected to the Sixth United States Congress from the southern district (March 4, 1799 – March 3, 1801); was defeated for reelection in 1800 running on the statewide Federalist ticket; resumed the practice of law; appointed master in chancery in 1826; died in Woodbury, Gloucester County, N.J.; interment in Presbyterian Cemetery in north Woodbury, New Jersey.

U.S. Senate
Preceded by John Rutherfurd	U.S. senator (Class 1) from New Jersey; 1798–1799; Served alongside: Richard Stockton	Succeeded by James Schureman
U.S. House of Representatives
Preceded by N/A	Member of the U.S. House of Representatives from New Jersey's 5th congressional district March 4, 1799-March 3, 1801	Succeeded by N/A
