= Jehu Patterson =

American politician (1765–1851)

Jehu Patterson (1765–1851) was an American Democratic Party politician, who represented Monmouth County in the New Jersey Legislative Council, the precursor to the New Jersey State Senate.

Jehu Patterson was born on December 14, 1765, in Middletown Township, New Jersey, and would reside there all his life. He was a member of the Middletown Baptist Church.

A farmer, he served as a member of the Middletown Township Committee, and served many years as a judge of the Court of Common Pleas in Monmouth County.

In 1831, Patterson was elected to a one-year term as a member of the Legislative Council; he was elected again in 1834. He served as Vice-President of Council in 1834.

Jehu Patterson died on July 22, 1851. A son, James, would serve on the Monmouth County Board of Chosen Freeholders as well as the Legislative Council.

== Notes and references ==
Political offices
Preceded by Mahlon Dickerson	Vice President of the New Jersey Legislative Council; 1834	Succeeded by Charles Sitgreaves
