= James Schureman =

American merchant and politician (1756–1824)

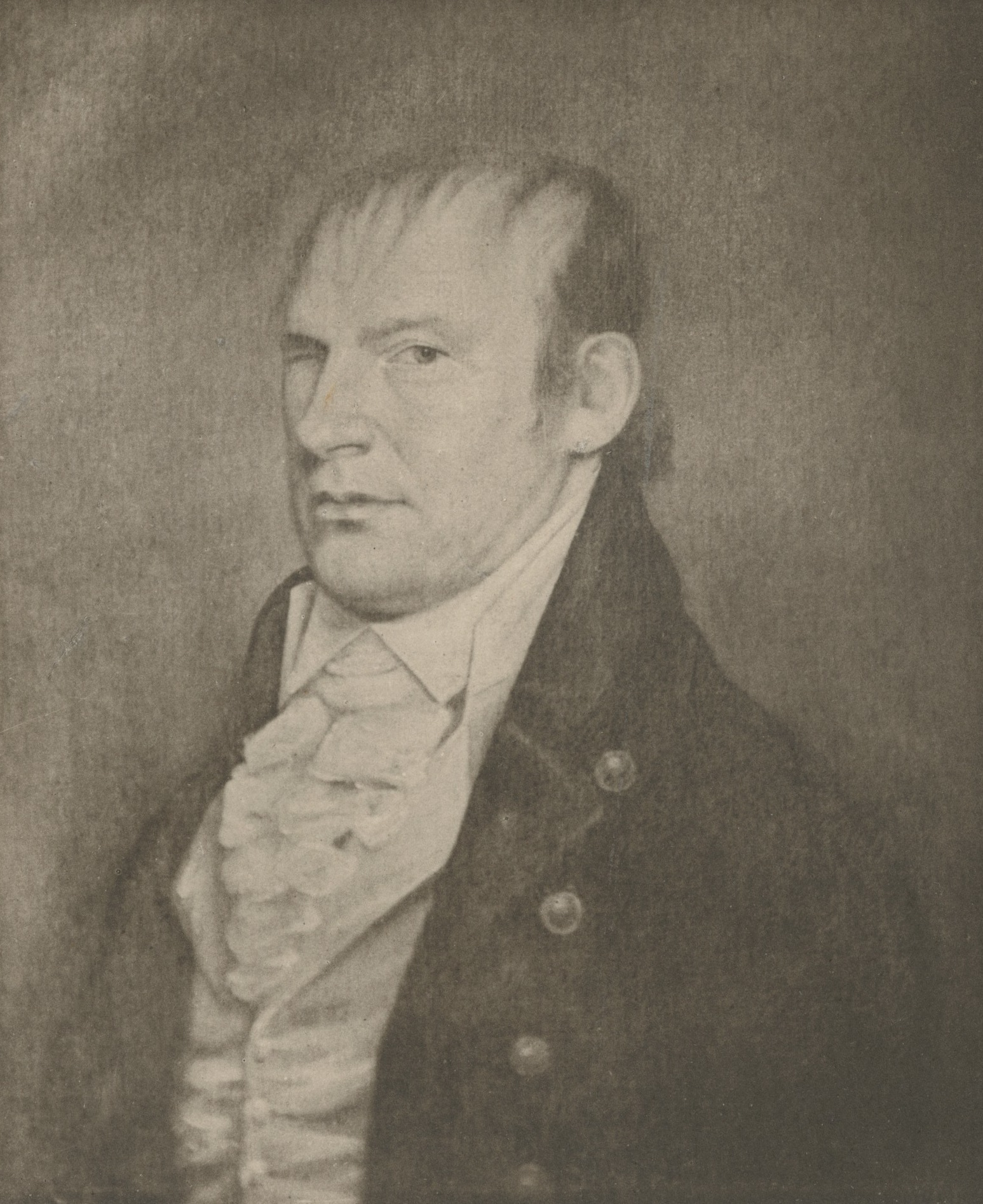

Member of the U.S. House of Representatives from New Jersey's 2nd district
- In office March 4, 1813 – March 3, 1815
- Preceded by: N/A
- Succeeded by: N/A

United States Senator from New Jersey
- In office March 4, 1799 – February 16, 1801
- Preceded by: Franklin Davenport
- Succeeded by: Aaron Ogden

Member of the U.S. House of Representatives from New Jersey's at-large district
- In office March 4, 1797 – March 3, 1799
- Preceded by: Thomas Henderson
- Succeeded by: District eliminated

Member of the U.S. House of Representatives from New Jersey's at-large district
- In office March 4, 1789 – March 3, 1791
- Preceded by: District created
- Succeeded by: Jonathan Dayton

Personal details
- Born: February 12, 1756 New Brunswick, Province of New Jersey, British America
- Died: January 22, 1824 (aged 67) New Brunswick, New Jersey, U.S.
- Party: Federalist
- Education: Queen's College (BA) 1775 (now known as Rutgers University)

James Schureman (February 12, 1756 – January 22, 1824) was an American merchant and statesman from New Brunswick, New Jersey. He represented New Jersey in the Continental Congress as well as the United States House of Representatives and United States Senate.

== Biography ==
James was born in New Brunswick in the Province of New Jersey and attended Queen's College (now Rutgers University), graduating in 1775. When he graduated he raised a volunteer company in New Brunswick and led it as captain in the Middlesex County militia. He led them in the Battle of Brooklyn on August 27, 1776, where he was captured. He was held as a prisoner of war until early in the spring of 1777 when he escaped to rejoin the Continental Army at Morristown.

Schureman returned to New Brunswick and took up a mercantile career while still serving in the militia. He was elected to the New Jersey General Assembly from 1783 to 1785. In 1786, New Jersey sent him as a delegate to the Continental Congress. That same year he was one of those at the Annapolis Convention that called for a new constitution for the United States. He continued in the Congressional session of 1787, then was returned to the state assembly in 1788.

When the United States was formed, Schureman was elected to the First House of Representatives, serving from 1789 until 1791. He served two other terms in the House, in the 9th Congress (1797–1799) and 14th Congress (1813–1815). He was elected to the U.S. Senate to complete the term of John Rutherfurd and served there from 1799 to 1801. Between these duties he served a number of years as the Mayor of New Brunswick, New Jersey including 1792–1794, 1801–1813, and 1821–1824. He also represented Middlesex County, New Jersey on the New Jersey Legislative Council for the 1808, 1810, and 1812–1813 sessions of the legislature, serving as Vice-President of Council in the latter session.

When Schureman died in 1824 at New Brunswick, he was buried in the churchyard of the First Dutch Reformed Church there. The church and cemetery still stand and are located at Neilson and Bayard Streets.

U.S. House of Representatives
Preceded by District inactive	Member of the U.S. House of Representatives from New Jersey's at-large congressional district March 4, 1789 – March 3, 1791	Succeeded by Jonathan Dayton
Preceded by Thomas Henderson	Member of the U.S. House of Representatives from New Jersey's at-large congressional district March 4, 1797 – March 3, 1799	Succeeded by John Condit
Preceded by N/A	Member of the U.S. House of Representatives from New Jersey's 2nd congressional district March 4, 1813 – March 3, 1815	Succeeded by N/A
U.S. Senate
Preceded by Franklin Davenport	U.S. senator (Class 1) from New Jersey; 1799–1801; Served alongside: Jonathan Dayton	Succeeded by Aaron Ogden
