= William Paterson (judge) =

US Supreme Court justice from 1793 to 1806

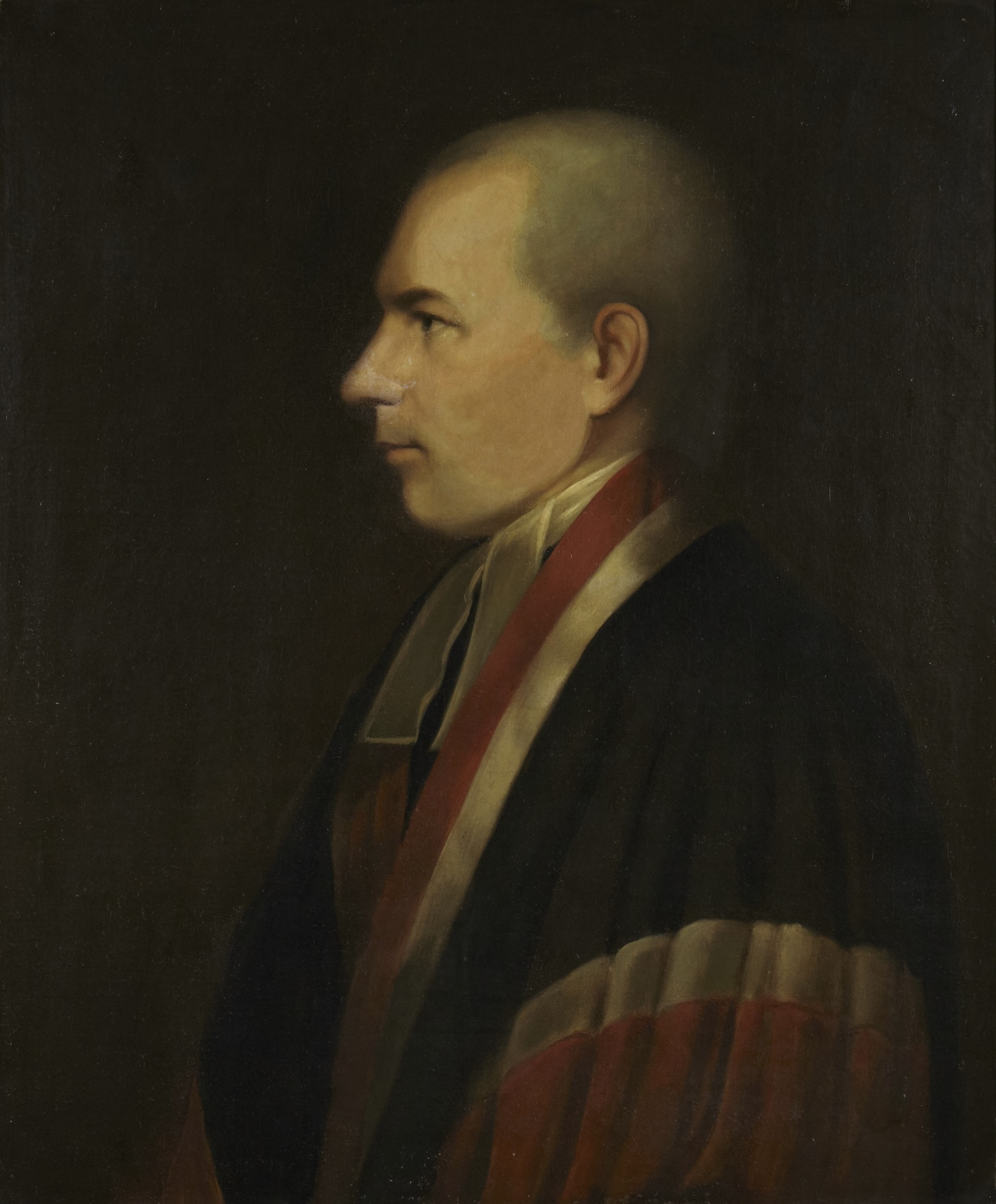
- Posthumous portrait by Edward Ludlow Mooney, after James Sharples, c. 1835–1874

Associate Justice of the Supreme Court of the United States
- In office March 11, 1793 – September 9, 1806
- Nominated by: George Washington
- Preceded by: Thomas Johnson
- Succeeded by: Henry Livingston

2nd Governor of New Jersey
- In office October 29, 1790 – March 30, 1793
- Preceded by: Elisha Lawrence (acting)
- Succeeded by: Thomas Henderson (acting)

United States Senator from New Jersey
- In office March 4, 1789 – November 13, 1790
- Preceded by: Seat established
- Succeeded by: Philemon Dickinson

1st Attorney General of New Jersey
- In office 1776–1783
- Governor: William Livingston
- Preceded by: Position established
- Succeeded by: Joseph Bloomfield

Personal details
- Born: December 24, 1745 County Antrim, Kingdom of Ireland
- Died: September 9, 1806 (aged 60) Albany, New York, U.S.
- Party: Federalist
- Spouses: Cornelia Bell (m. 1779; died 1783) Euphemia White (m. 1785)
- Children: 3
- Education: Princeton University (BA, MA)

Military service
- Allegiance: United Colonies of North America
- Branch/service: Continental Army
- Rank: Commissioned Officer
- Unit: Somerset County Battalion of 2nd New Jersey Regiment
- Battles/wars: American Revolutionary War

William Paterson (December 24, 1745 – September 9, 1806) was an American statesman, lawyer, jurist, and signer of the United States Constitution. He was an associate justice of the United States Supreme Court, the second governor of New Jersey, and a Founding Father of the United States.

Born in County Antrim, Ireland, Paterson moved to the North American British colonies at a young age. After graduating from the College of New Jersey (now Princeton University) and studying law under Richard Stockton, he was admitted to the bar in 1768. He helped write the 1776 Constitution of New Jersey and served as the New Jersey Attorney General from 1776 to 1783. He represented New Jersey at the 1787 Constitutional Convention, where he proposed the New Jersey Plan, which would have provided for equal representation among the states in Congress.

After the ratification of the Constitution, Paterson served in the United States Senate from 1789 to 1790, helping to draft the Judiciary Act of 1789. He resigned from the Senate to take office as governor of New Jersey. In 1793, he accepted appointment by President George Washington to serve as an associate justice of the Supreme Court. He served on the court until his death in 1806.

== Early life ==
William Paterson was born December 24, 1745, in County Antrim, Ireland, to Richard Paterson, an Ulster Protestant. Paterson immigrated with his parents to America, disembarking at New Castle, Delaware, in 1747 and living in a variety of locations before settling at Princeton, New Jersey. At 14, he began college at the College of New Jersey, later known as Princeton University. After graduating, he read law with the prominent lawyer Richard Stockton and was admitted to the bar in 1768. He also stayed connected to his alma mater and helped found the Cliosophic Society with Aaron Burr.

== Career ==
=== Early career ===
Paterson was selected as a Somerset County delegate for the first three provincial congresses of New Jersey, where, as secretary, he recorded the 1776 New Jersey State Constitution. Paterson was appointed as the first attorney general of New Jersey, serving from 1776 to 1783, establishing himself as one of the state's most prominent lawyers. He was sent to the 1787 Philadelphia Convention, where he proposed the New Jersey Plan for a unicameral legislative body with equal representation from each state. The Constitution of the United States was ultimately signed with the Connecticut Compromise that created a bicameral Congress with a Senate that equally represented each state and a House of Representatives with population-based representation.

=== Military Service ===
In 1775, Paterson was commissioned into the Somerset County Minutemen of the New Jersey militia and served on the Council of Safety, the body that developed and managed New Jersey's military forces for the American Revolutionary War.

=== United States Senator ===
Paterson, who was a strong nationalist who supported the Federalist Party, went on to become one of New Jersey's first U.S. senators (1789–90). As a member of the Senate Judiciary Committee, he played an important role in drafting the Judiciary Act of 1789 that established the federal court system. The first nine sections of this very important law are in his handwriting.

=== Governor of New Jersey ===
In 1790, he became the first person to resign from the U.S. Senate, when he did so in order to succeed fellow signer William Livingston as governor of New Jersey. As governor, Paterson pursued his interest in legal matters by codifying the English statutes that had been in force in New Jersey before the Revolution in Laws of the State of New Jersey. He also published a revision of the rules of the chancery and common law courts in Paterson, later adopted by the New Jersey Legislature.

=== United States Supreme Court ===
President George Washington nominated Paterson for the Supreme Court of the United States on February 27, 1793, to the seat vacated by Thomas Johnson. Washington withdrew the nomination the following day, having realized that since the Judiciary Act of 1789 (the law creating the Supreme Court) had been passed during Paterson's current term as a Senator, the nomination was a violation of the Ineligibility Clause (Article I, Section 6) of the Constitution. Washington re-nominated Paterson to the court on March 4, 1793, after his term as Senator had expired; Paterson was immediately confirmed by the Senate and received his commission.

He resigned from the governorship to become an associate justice of the U.S. Supreme Court. On the circuit, he presided over the trials of individuals indicted for treason in the Whiskey Rebellion, a revolt by farmers in western Pennsylvania over the federal excise tax on whiskey, the principal product of their cash crop. Militia sent out by President Washington successfully quelled the uprising, and for the first time, the courts had to interpret the provisions of the Constitution concerning the use of troops in civil disturbances. Here, and, throughout his long career, Paterson extolled the primacy of law over governments, a principle embodied in the Constitution he helped write. He declined an appointment as Secretary of State in 1795. Paterson was elected to the American Philosophical Society in 1789. He was elected a Fellow of the American Academy of Arts and Sciences in 1801. Paterson served on the Supreme Court until he died in 1806.

== Personal life ==
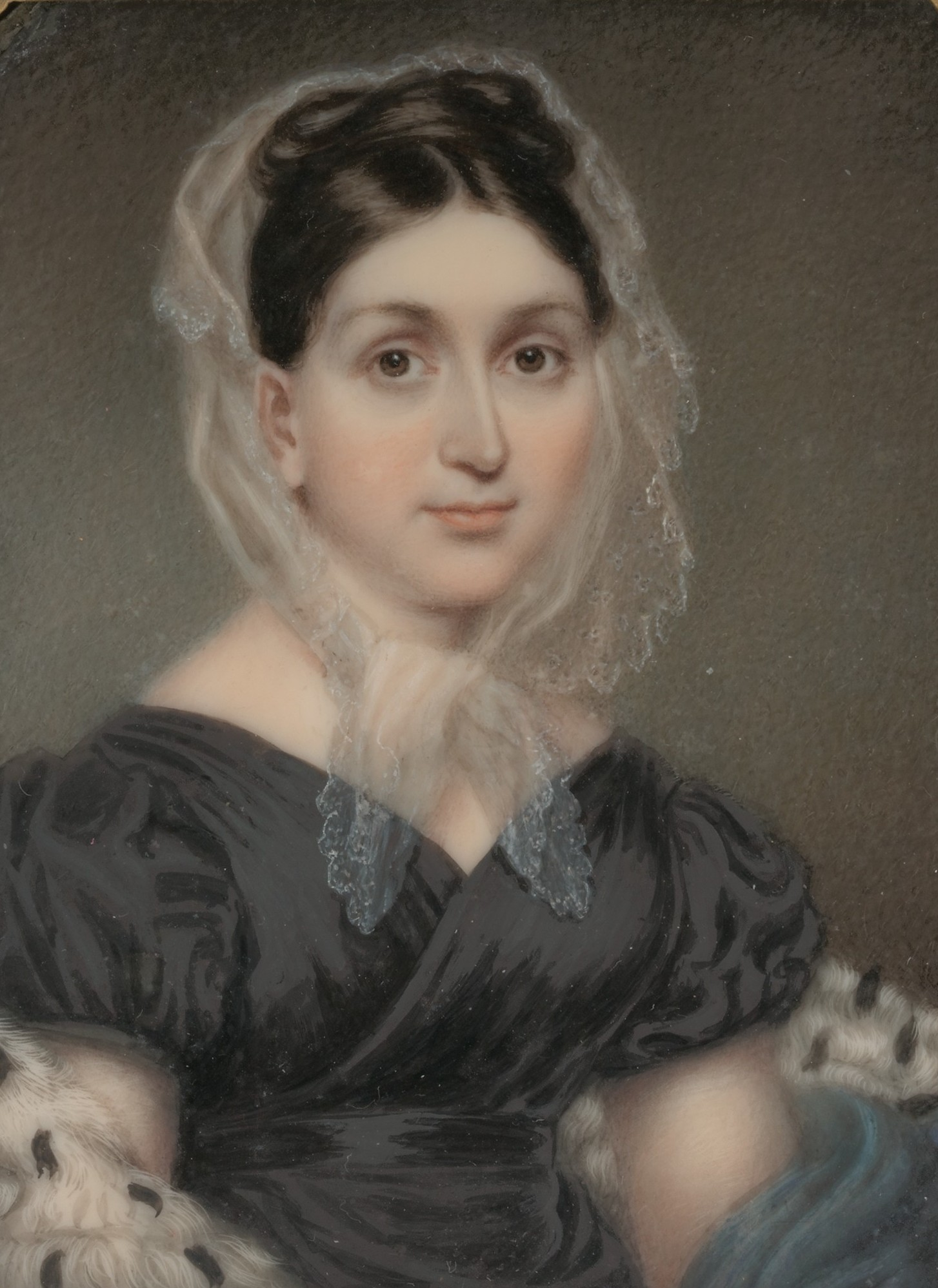
Paterson's eldest daughter, Cornelia Bell Paterson Van Rensselaer (1780–1844), painted by Nathaniel Rogers, 1825

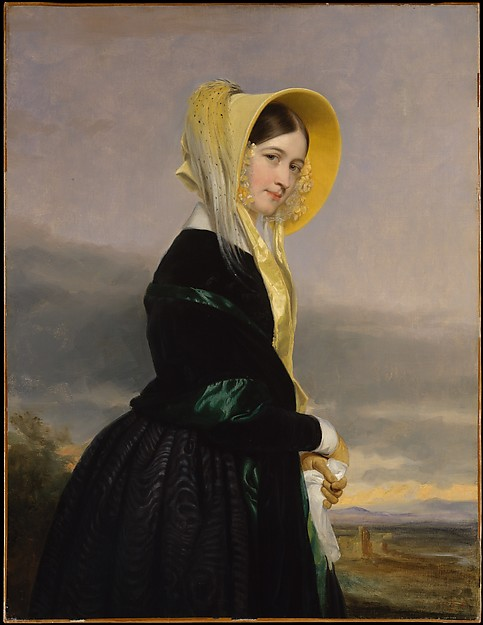
Paterson's granddaughter, Euphemia White Van Rensselaer (1816–1888), painted by George P. A. Healy, 1842

In 1779, Paterson married Cornelia Bell (1755–1783), daughter of John Bell, a wealthy Somerset County landowner. Together, they had three children, but she died in 1783 shortly after giving birth to their only son. Their children were:

- Cornelia Bell Paterson (1780–1844), who married Stephen Van Rensselaer (1764–1839) after the death of his first wife, Margaret "Peggy" Schuyler (1758–1801)
- Frances Van Paterson (1781–1783), who died young
- William Bell Paterson (1783–1832), who married Jane Eliza Neilson

In 1785, he married Euphemia White (1746–1832), sister of Anthony Walton White (1750–1803), daughter of Anthony White (1717–1787), a New Jersey landholder and judge of the Somerset court, and the granddaughter of Lewis Morris (1671–1746), chief justice of New York from 1715 to 1733 and governor of New Jersey from 1738 to 1746.

=== Death and interment ===
On September 9, 1806, Paterson, aged 60, died from the lingering effects of a coach accident suffered in 1803 while on circuit court duty in New Jersey. He was on his way to the spa at Ballston Springs, New York, to "take the waters", when he died at the Van Rensselaer Manor home of his daughter, Cornelia, and son-in-law, Stephen Van Rensselaer, in Albany, New York. He was laid to rest in the Van Renssalaer family vault. When the city acquired the property, Paterson's remains were relocated to Albany Rural Cemetery Menands in Albany County, New York. Also buried there are Associate Justice Rufus W. Peckham and President Chester A. Arthur.

=== Descendants ===
Through his eldest daughter, his grandchildren include Cortlandt Van Rensselaer (1808–1860), a noted Presbyterian clergyman, and Henry Bell Van Rensselaer (1810–1864), a politician and general in the Union Army during the American Civil War, who married Elizabeth Ray King, a granddaughter of U.S. Senator Rufus King.

Through his son, his grandchildren included twin brothers, William Paterson (1817–1899), who married Salvadora Meade, a Spanish-born woman living in Philadelphia, and Stephen Van Rensselaer Paterson (1817–1872), who married Emily Sophia King (1823–1853), daughter of Charles King (1789–1867), the president of Columbia University, and the second son Rufus King. Both grandsons were members of the Princeton University class of 1835 and William was admitted to the bar in 1838. He later served as a member of the New Jersey Assembly from 1842 to 1843, Secretary of the New Jersey Constitutional Convention of 1844, a lay judge of the Court of Errors and Appeals, and mayor of Perth Amboy for ten years in between 1846 and 1878.

=== Honors ===
Both the city of Paterson, and the college, William Paterson University, are named after him.

== See also ==
- List of justices of the Supreme Court of the United States
- List of United States governors born outside the United States
- List of United States senators born outside the United States
- List of United States Supreme Court justices by time in office
- U.S. Constitution, floor leader in Convention.

Legal offices
New office	Attorney General of New Jersey; 1776–1783	Succeeded by Joseph Bloomfield
Preceded by Thomas Johnson	Associate Justice of the Supreme Court of the United States; 1793–1806	Succeeded by Henry Livingston
U.S. Senate
New seat	U.S. senator (Class 2) from New Jersey; 1789–1790; Served alongside: Jonathan Elmer	Succeeded by Philemon Dickinson
Political offices
Preceded by Elisha Lawrence; Acting	Governor of New Jersey; 1790–1793	Succeeded by Thomas Henderson; Acting
