= Salter's Mill =

- U.S. National Register of Historic Places
- U.S. Historic district – Contributing property
- New Jersey Register of Historic Places
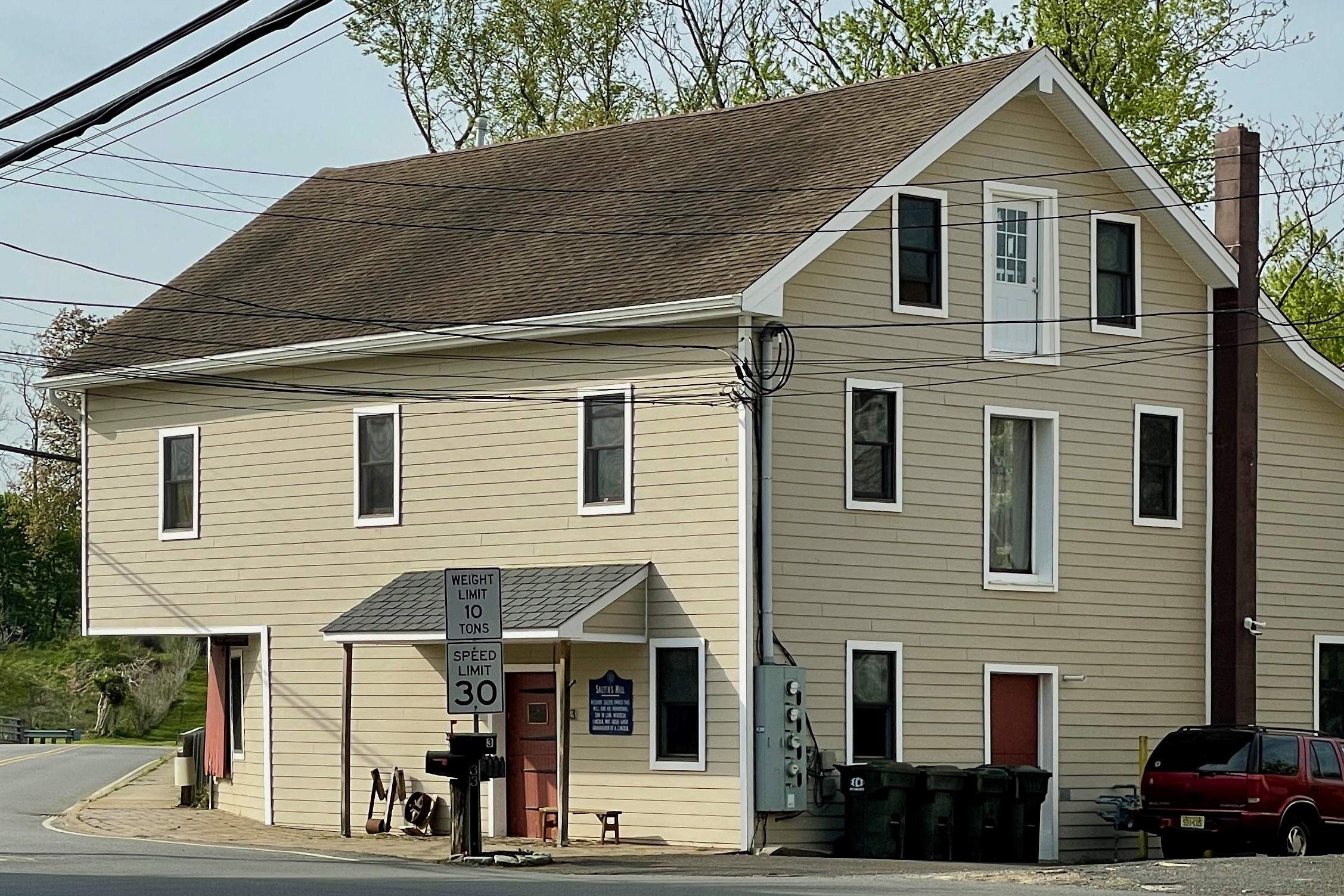
- Salter's Mill in 2021

- Location within Monmouth County, New Jersey Location within New Jersey Location within the United States
- Location: 33 Imlaystown Road, Imlaystown, New Jersey
- Coordinates: 40°09′54″N 74°30′51″W
- Area: 1 acre (0.40 ha)
- Built: 1897
- Part of: Imlaystown Historic District (ID85000032)
- NRHP reference No.: 80002507
- NJRHP No.: 2068

Significant dates
- Added to NRHP: September 29, 1980
- Designated CP: January 3, 1985
- Designated NJRHP: February 27, 1980

Salter's Mill is a historic gristmill built c. 1897 and located at 33 Imlaystown Road in the Imlaystown section of Upper Freehold Township in Monmouth County, New Jersey. It was added to the National Register of Historic Places on September 29, 1980, for its significance in agriculture, architecture, and exploration/settlement. The mill is next to a 28-acre (11 ha) mill pond, which was also used in the ice business. In 1985, it was also listed as a contributing property of the Imlaystown Historic District.

== History ==
A 17th century mill was built here by Richard Salter. It was badly damaged by a fire in 1897 and the current mill was built soon afterwards. The two and one-half story frame building has a horizontal turbine wheel. The mill was later owned by the Imlay family, namesake of the community. The last owner was the Golden family, who closed mill operations in 1962.

Richard Salter's daughter, Hannah, married Mordecai Lincoln, who were great-great-grandparents of Abraham Lincoln.

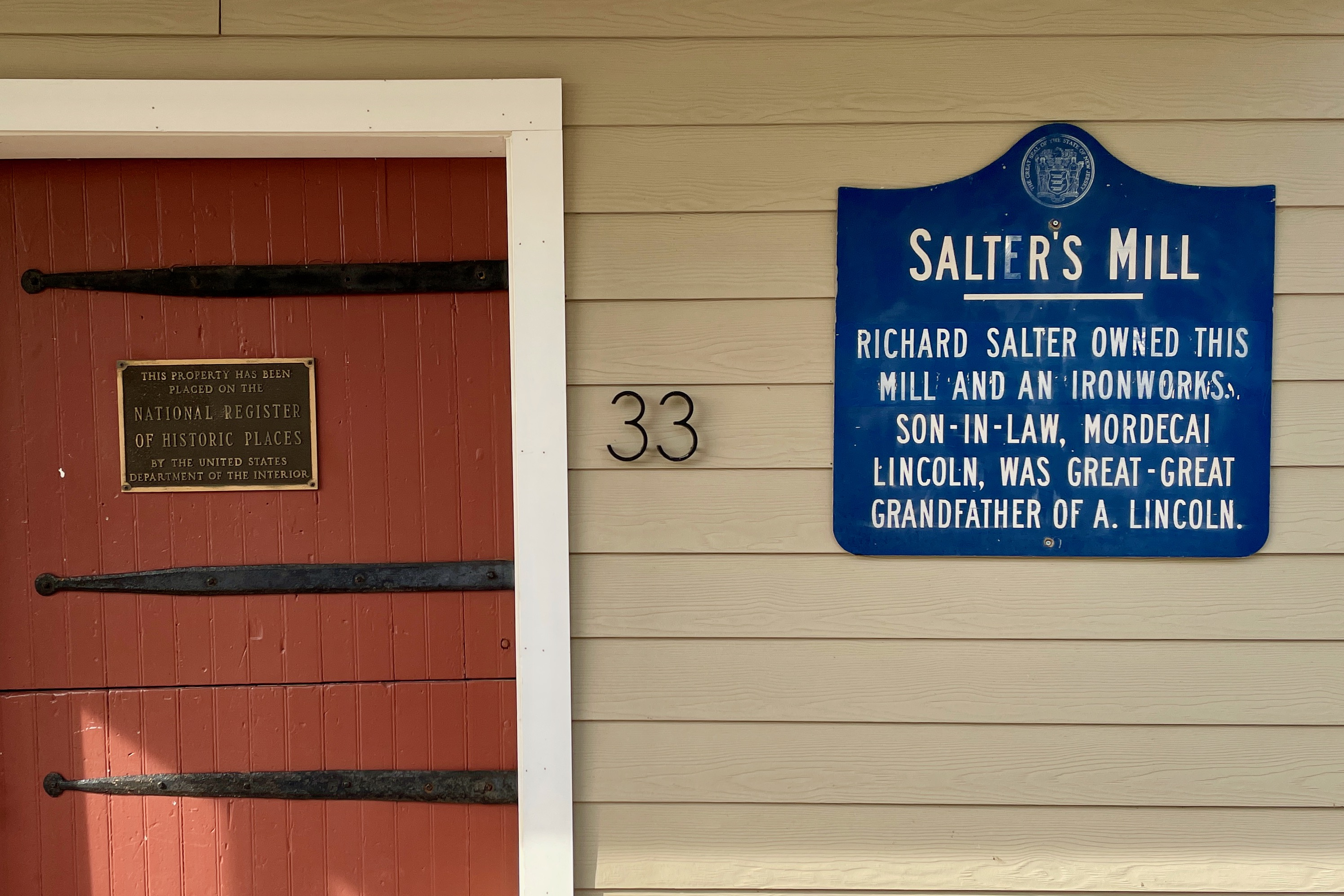
Information signs

== See also ==
- National Register of Historic Places listings in Monmouth County, New Jersey
