= Imlaystown, New Jersey =

Populated place in Monmouth County, New Jersey, US

- Unincorporated community
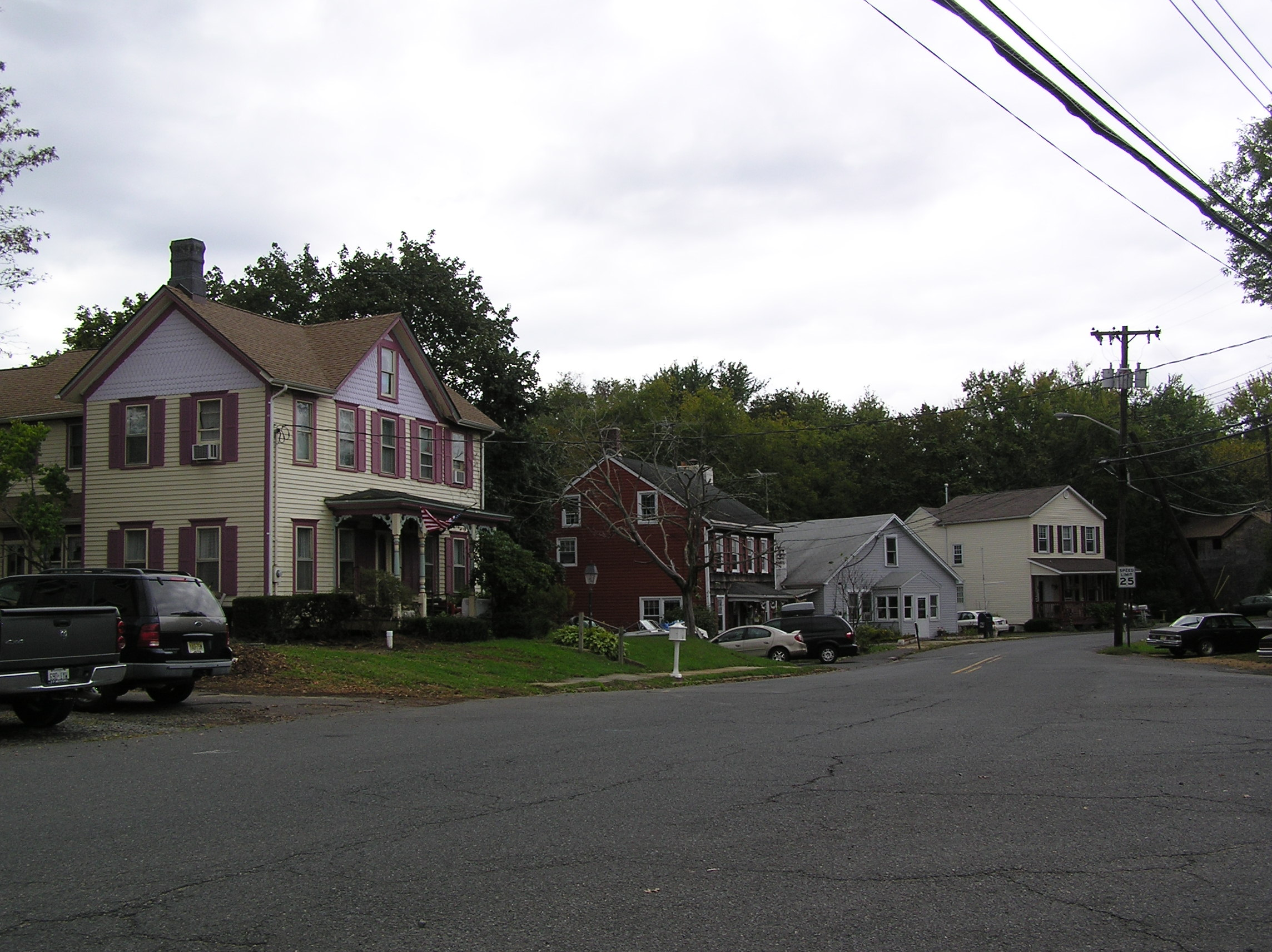
- Center of Imlaystown

- Location within Monmouth County, New Jersey Location within New Jersey Location within the United States
- Coordinates: 40°10′03″N 74°30′55″W
- Country: United States
- State: New Jersey
- County: Monmouth
- Township: Upper Freehold
- Named for: Imlay family
- Elevation: 105 ft (32 m)
- ZIP code: 08501
- GNIS feature ID: 877307

Imlaystown is an unincorporated community located along County Route 43 (Imlaystown Road) and Davis Station Road within Upper Freehold Township in Monmouth County in the U.S. state of New Jersey. It is located in ZIP code 08526. The community is accessible from Exit 11 of Interstate 195.

== History ==
Founded in 1690, the community was once the social, economic and political focus of Upper Freehold. It consists of approximately 30 buildings from the mid-19th century. Most were rebuilt in 1898 after a fire which destroyed much of the town. It takes its name from the Imlay family, the area's major landowners in the colonial period.

The Imlaystown post office was established on April 16, 1832, and discontinued on November 28, 2009.

== Historic district ==
- Imlaystown Historic District
- U.S. National Register of Historic Places
- U.S. Historic district
- New Jersey Register of Historic Places
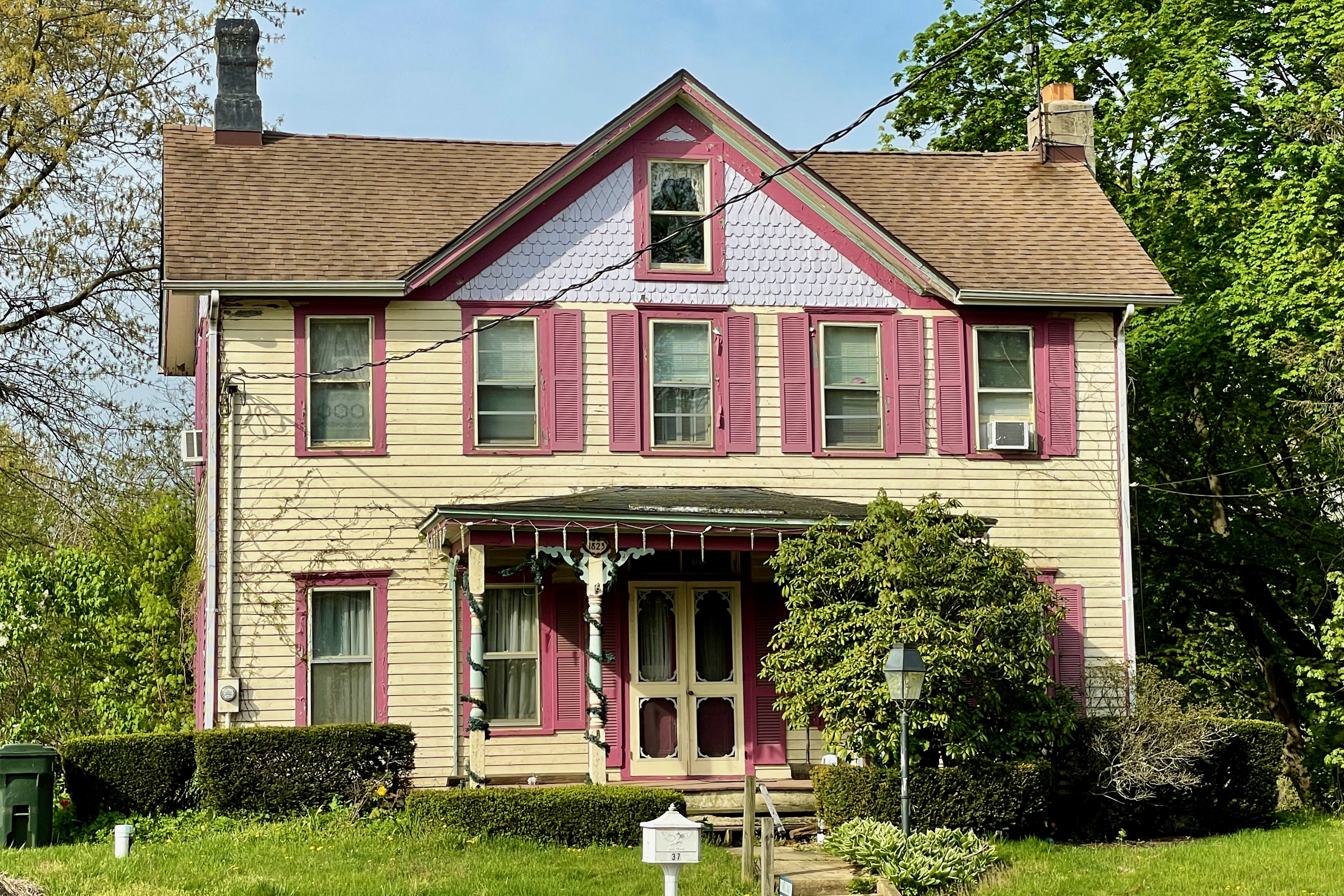
- Former Barclay P. Malsbury House
- Area: 51 acres (21 ha)
- NRHP reference No.: 85000032
- NJRHP No.: 2066

Significant dates
- Added to NRHP: January 3, 1985
- Designated NJRHP: November 13, 1984

The Imlaystown Historic District is a 51-acre (21 ha) historic district encompassing the community. It was added to the National Register of Historic Places on January 3, 1985 for its significance in commerce, exploration/settlement, and industry. It includes 29 contributing buildings.

The district includes Salter's Mill, listed individually on the NRHP in 1980. The two-story brick school building was constructed in 1930 with Colonial Revival style.

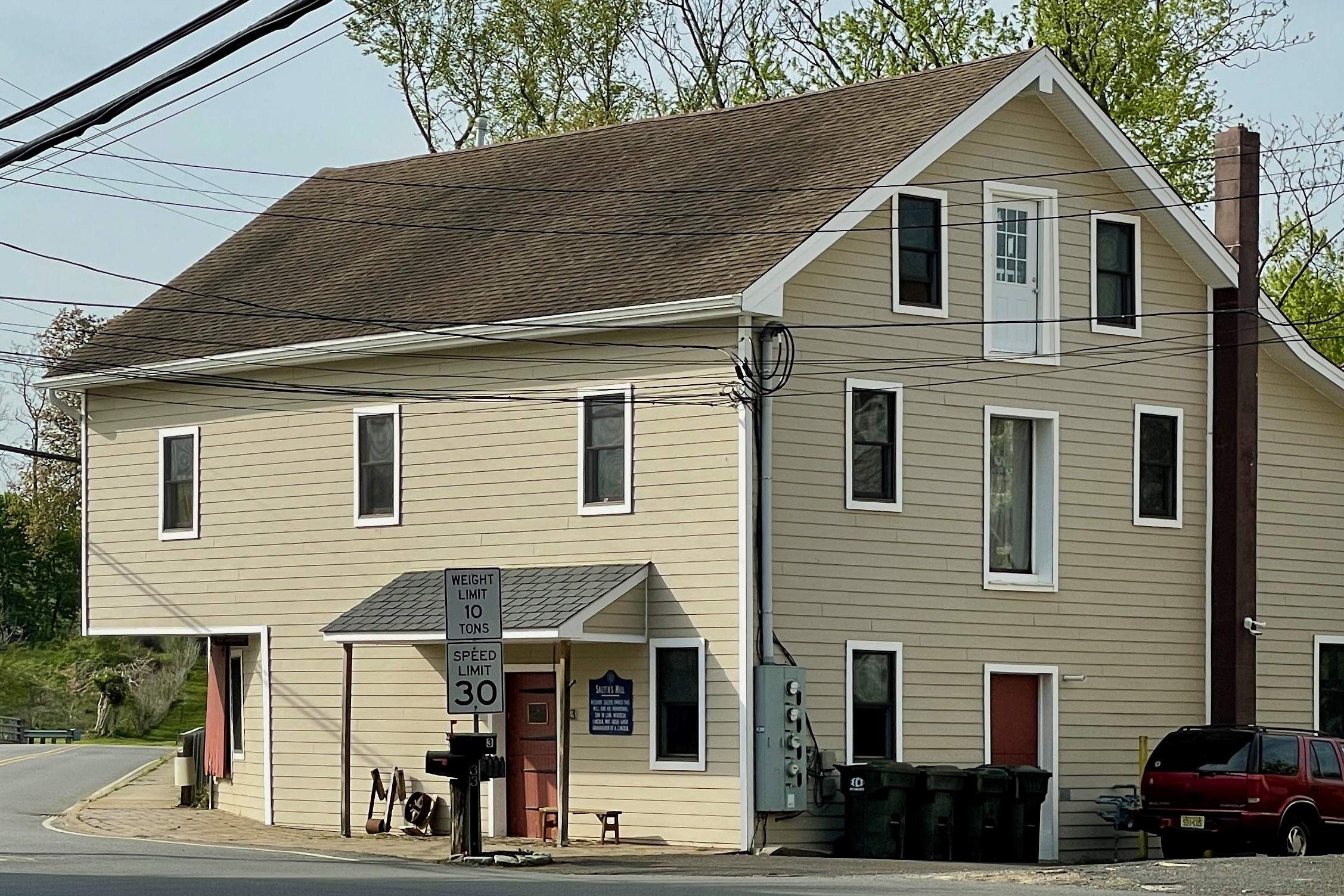
Salter's Mill

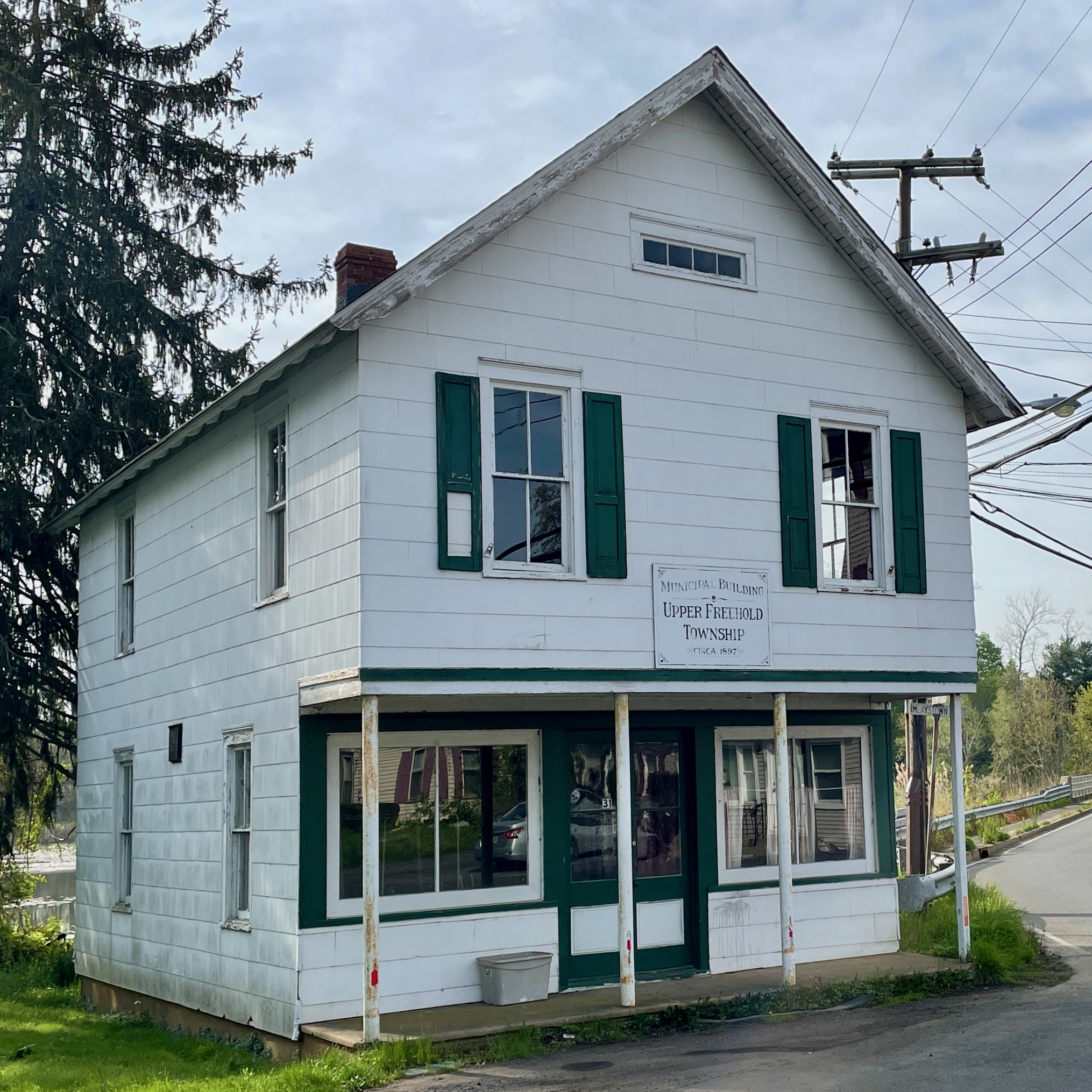
Former Upper Freehold Township Municipal Building

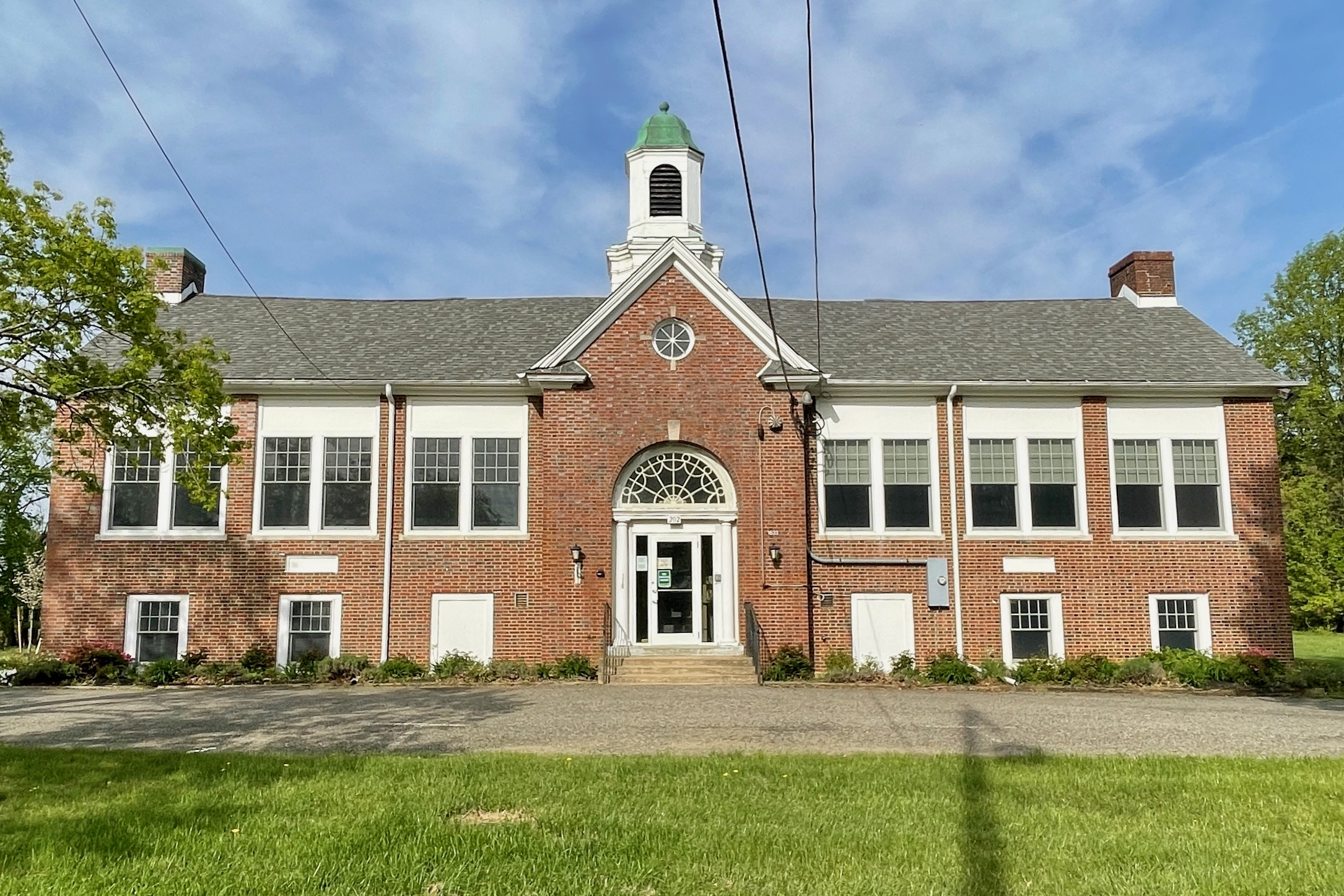
Colonial Revival style school, built 1930

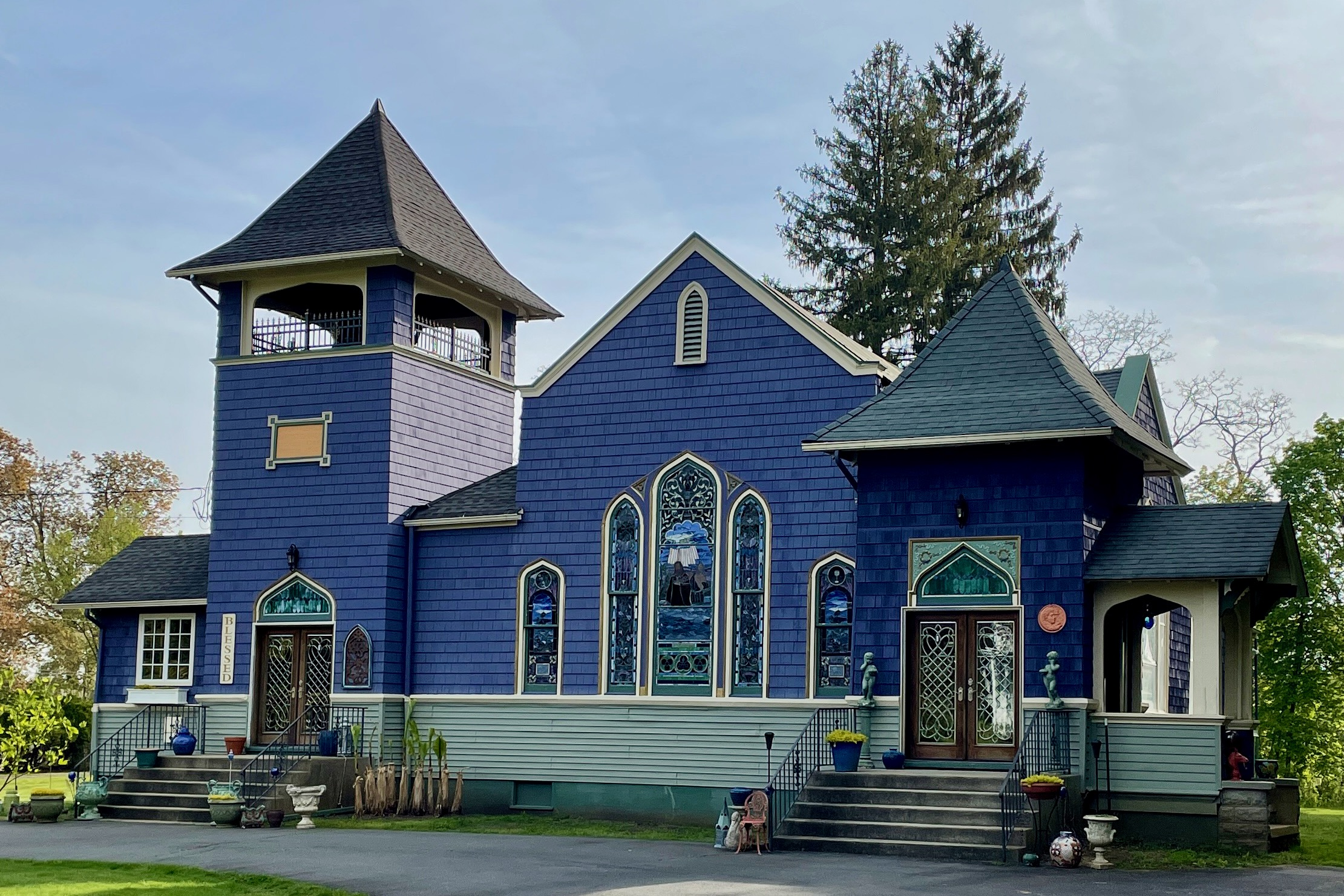
Former Upper Freehold Baptist Church

== Points of interest ==
Ye Olde Yellow Meeting House was built in 1737 by a congregation begun in 1720.

The most recognizable building in Imlaystown is Salter's Mill situated on a 28-acre (110,000 m^{2}) millpond that once supported an ice business as well as the mill.

The Happy Apple Inn is the community's only restaurant. Built as a stagecoach stopover between Trenton and the Jersey Shore in the mid-19th century, the current structure was rebuilt following a fire in 1904. The Happy Apple was opened in 1972 by the father of its present owners, Buddy Westendorf and wife Donna.

== Preservation ==
Since the community's addition to the state and national registers of historic places in 1985, portions have suffered from neglect. While the community was somewhat revitalized in the 1990s, including the restoration of the millpond in 1995, many of its buildings are now dilapidated. Some are currently uninhabitable due to septic issues created by the proximity to Doctor's Creek. Upper Freehold's recent "Master Plan" was supposed to address the preservation of historic structures, rural character, and open space. Preservation New Jersey believes that preventing the decay of Imlaystown is key to realizing the vision of this plan.

== Notable people ==
- George Franklin Fort (1809–1872), politician, physician, and judge
- Chris Tomson (born 1984), drummer with the band Vampire Weekend

== See also ==
- National Register of Historic Places listings in Monmouth County, New Jersey
