= Daniel Hooper (New Jersey judge) =

Major Daniel Hooper (died 1700/01) was a judge and politician in New Jersey.

== Biography ==
Daniel Hooper was a native of Christ Church, Barbados, and spent his time between New Jersey and his native island.

On September 12, 1679, Daniel Hooper was commissioned as a member of a County Court for Elizabethtown and Newark, which would later evolve into Essex County. He is mentioned in the commission as being of the East New Jersey Provincial Council, but no other record survives of his tenure on the council.

He would later return to Barbados, as he is referred to as being of that island in a February 27, 1692/3 patent for 648 acres in Somerset County, New Jersey

Daniel Hooper made his will on October 1, 1700; it was proved in Barbados on February 12, 1700/01.

== Family ==
Daniel Hooper was married to Eleanor before 1673 in Barbados. They had several children including Daniel, Robert Lettis, Mary, Elizabeth, John, Anne, William and Eleanor. A great-grandson, Robert Lettis Hooper, Jr., would serve the Patriot cause in the American Revolutionary War, and would serve as Vice President of the New Jersey Legislative Council.
