= Thomas Henderson (New Jersey politician) =

American politician (1743–1824)

Acting Governor of New Jersey
- In office March 30, 1793 – June 3, 1793
- Preceded by: William Paterson as Governor
- Succeeded by: Richard Howell as Governor

Vice President of the New Jersey Legislative Council
- In office 1793–1795
- Governor: William Paterson; Himself; Richard Howell
- Preceded by: Elisha Lawrence
- Succeeded by: Elisha Lawrence

Member of the U.S. House of Representatives from New Jersey's at-large congressional district
- In office March 4, 1795 – March 4, 1797
- Preceded by: James Schureman; Elias Boudinot
- Succeeded by: James Henderson Imlay; James Schureman; Thomas Sinnickson

Personal details
- Born: August 15, 1743 Freehold, Province of New Jersey, British America
- Died: December 15, 1824 (aged 81) Freehold Township, New Jersey, U.S.
- Party: Federalist

Thomas Henderson (August 15, 1743 – December 15, 1824) was a United States representative from New Jersey. He served as acting governor of New Jersey in 1793. He was also a Lieutenant Colonel in the Continental Army and a medical doctor in Monmouth County, New Jersey.

== Early life ==
Henderson was born in Freehold in the Province of New Jersey, on August 15, 1743. He attended the public schools and graduated from Princeton College in 1761. He studied medicine and practiced in Freneau, New Jersey and Freehold Township, New Jersey. He was a member of the Committee of Safety in 1774 and served as a lieutenant in the New Jersey Line in 1775. He was appointed second major in Col. Charles Stewart's battalion of Minutemen on February 15, 1776, and was a brigade major of the Monmouth County militia, April 19, 1776. He was major of Nathaniel Heard's battalion, June 14, 1776, and later lieutenant colonel and brigadier major at Monmouth.

== Medical career ==
He learned to practice medicine under Nathaniel Scudder, and in 1766 he became a member of the New Jersey Medical Society.

== Politics ==
Henderson was surrogate of Monmouth County in 1776, and a member of the provincial council in 1777. He was elected as a delegate to the Continental Congress, November 17, 1779, but declined to serve on December 25, 1779. He served in the New Jersey General Assembly from 1780 to 1784, and was a master in chancery in 1790. He was a member of the New Jersey Legislative Council (now the New Jersey Senate) in 1793 and 1794, serving as Vice President of that body, and in 1793 and 1794 he was Acting Governor of New Jersey. Henderson was elected as a Federalist to the Fourth Congress, serving from March 4, 1795, to March 3, 1797; he was previously a candidate for Congress in 1789 and 1791. He was a candidate in the 1799 special election for the U.S. Senate, losing by two votes to James Schureman. From 1783 to 1799 he was a judge of the Court of Common Pleas, and was one of the commissioners appointed to settle the boundary line between New Jersey and Pennsylvania. He was again a member of the State Council in 1812 and 1813.

== Military career ==
Henderson was made a Second Major under Colonel Walter Stewart's battalion of Minutemen, on February 15, 1776. On June 14, 1776, he became a Major under Colonel Heard, and later became a Lieutenant Colonel under Colonel David Forman's battalion in Heard's brigade.

Henderson fought in the Battle of Monmouth as a Lieutenant Colonel. Henderson was the famed "lone horseman" to inform General George Washington that American General Charles Lee had retreated.

== Family and death ==
Henderson married first wife, Mary Hendricks in 1767. Unfortunately, she died of tuberculosis soon after their marriage. Ten years later, in 1778, Henderson married Rachel Burrowes and they had seven children. In 1824, Henderson died in Freehold; interment was in Old Tennent Cemetery, Manalapan.

== Cincinnati Hall ==
The site in Freehold where Henderson lived, also known as Cincinnati Hall, was added to the New Jersey Register of Historic Places, on December 14, 2005 (ID# 4617). On June 17, 1778, just one day prior to the Battle of Monmouth, the British army burned down Dr. Henderson's home, along with at least 7 other residences in the Freehold area. Fortunately, as the British were leaving, Dr. Henderson's neighbors ran to the house and were able to partially save the mansion. Henderson's property consisted of 220 acres and was one of the largest estates in the area.

After the Battle of Monmouth concluded, Henderson rebuilt his home on the same site and named n "Cincinnati Hall." He regularly hosted social gatherings at the house, even hosting General Washington.

The Dr. Thomas Henderson House Site Barn was then added to the New Jersey Register of Historic Places on January 14, 2020 (ID# 5756). In 2023, the Freehold Township Historic Preservation Commission received an award from the Monmouth County Historical Commission for restoring the Henderson barn. The barn was built in the early nineteenth century with beams from the original home.

== Society of Cincinnatus ==
Henderson was an original member of the Society of the Cincinnati, which was formed in 1783.

Political offices
Preceded by William Paterson; Governor	Acting Governor of New Jersey; March 30, 1793 – June 3, 1793	Succeeded by Richard Howell; Governor
U.S. House of Representatives
Preceded by Elias Boudinot	Member of the U.S. House of Representatives from New Jersey's at-large congressional district March 4, 1795 – March 3, 1797	Succeeded by James Schureman
