= James Patterson (New Jersey politician) =

American politician (1794–1867)

James Patterson (March 25, 1794 – May 2, 1867) was an American Democratic Party politician from New Jersey, who served as director of the Monmouth County, New Jersey Board of Chosen Freeholders and the New Jersey Legislative Council.

== Biography ==
A son of Jehu Patterson, James Patterson was born in Middletown Township, New Jersey on March 25, 1794.

Elected as a Democrat to the Legislative Council in 1841, Patterson served through 1844. In 1843 he was elected Vice President of Council, a position held a decade earlier by his father.

In 1845, Patterson was elected to the Board of Chosen Freeholders representing Middletown Township. At the May 14, 1851 annual reorganization, he was chosen as Director of the Monmouth County, New Jersey Board of Chosen Freeholders, and served as director through May 9, 1855 when he left the board.

Patterson returned to the state legislature in 1860, when he was elected to the General Assembly; he was reelected in 1861.

James Patterson died on May 2, 1867.

Five sons would serve in public office, namely, Jehu, James and C. Ewing, who each would serve as county clerk; John, sheriff; and Samuel, freeholder.

== See also ==
- List of Monmouth County Freeholder Directors

== Notes and references ==
Political offices
Preceded by William Chetwood	Vice President of the New Jersey Legislative Council; 1844	Succeeded by John C. Smallwood (as President of the New Jersey Senate)
Preceded by Benjamin I. Lafetra	Monmouth County Freeholder Director; 1851-1855	Succeeded by Henry Howland
