= Red Valley, New Jersey =

Populated place in Monmouth County, New Jersey, US

- Unincorporated community
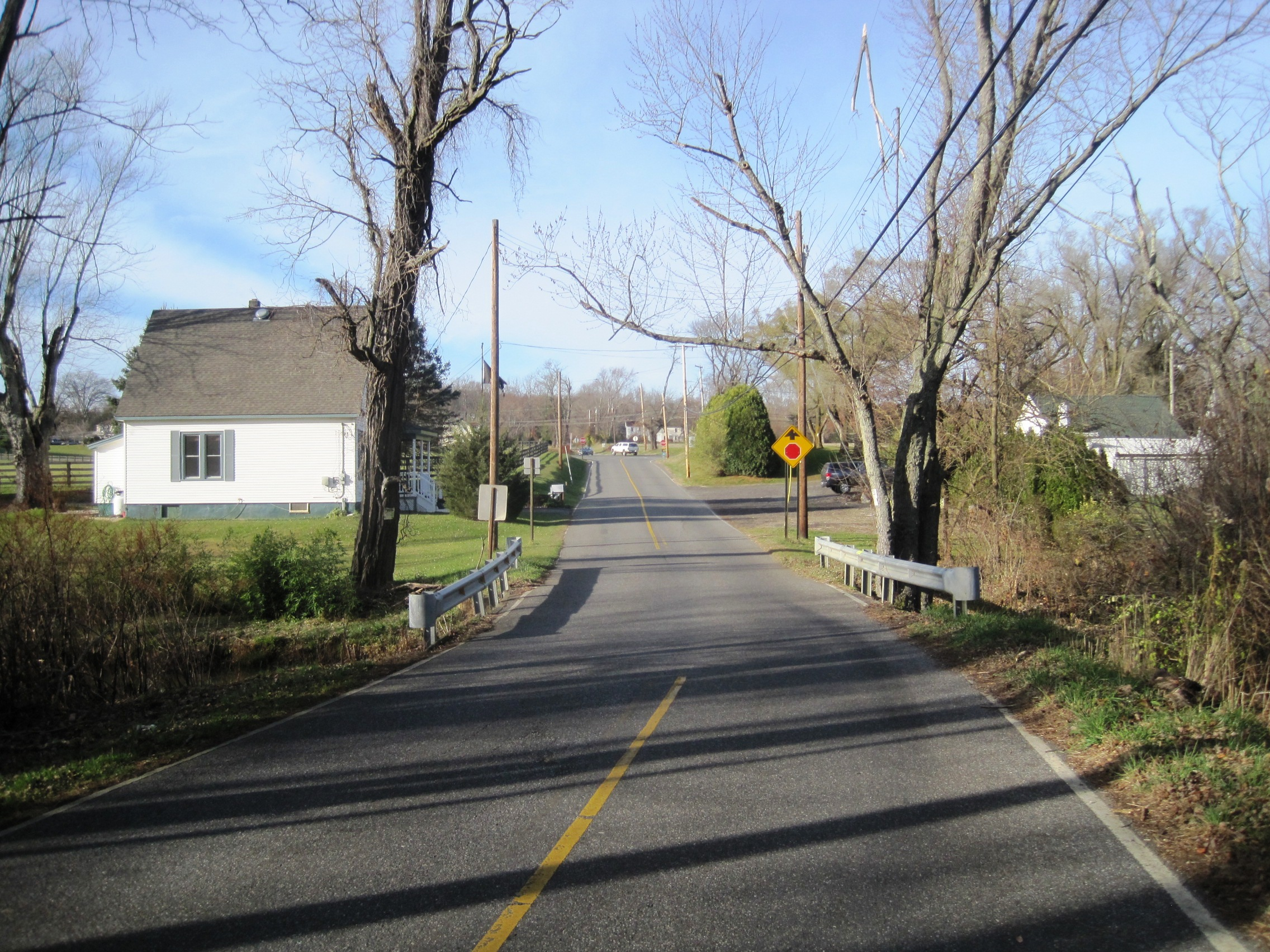
- Along Red Valley Road

- Location within Monmouth County, New Jersey Location within New Jersey Location within the United States
- Coordinates: 40°09′42″N 74°28′14″W
- Country: United States
- State: New Jersey
- County: Monmouth
- Township: Upper Freehold
- Elevation: 148 ft (45 m)
- Time zone: UTC−05:00 (Eastern (EST))
  - Summer (DST): UTC−04:00 (EDT)
- GNIS feature ID: 879642

Red Valley is an unincorporated community located within Upper Freehold Township in Monmouth County, in the U.S. state of New Jersey. The settlement is located at the intersection of County Route 526 and Red Valley Road (south) and Yellow Meetinghouse Road (north) near the township's eastern border with Millstone Township. Except for some single-family houses located along the roads in the area, the area is primarily made up of farmland (both agricultural and horse farms).

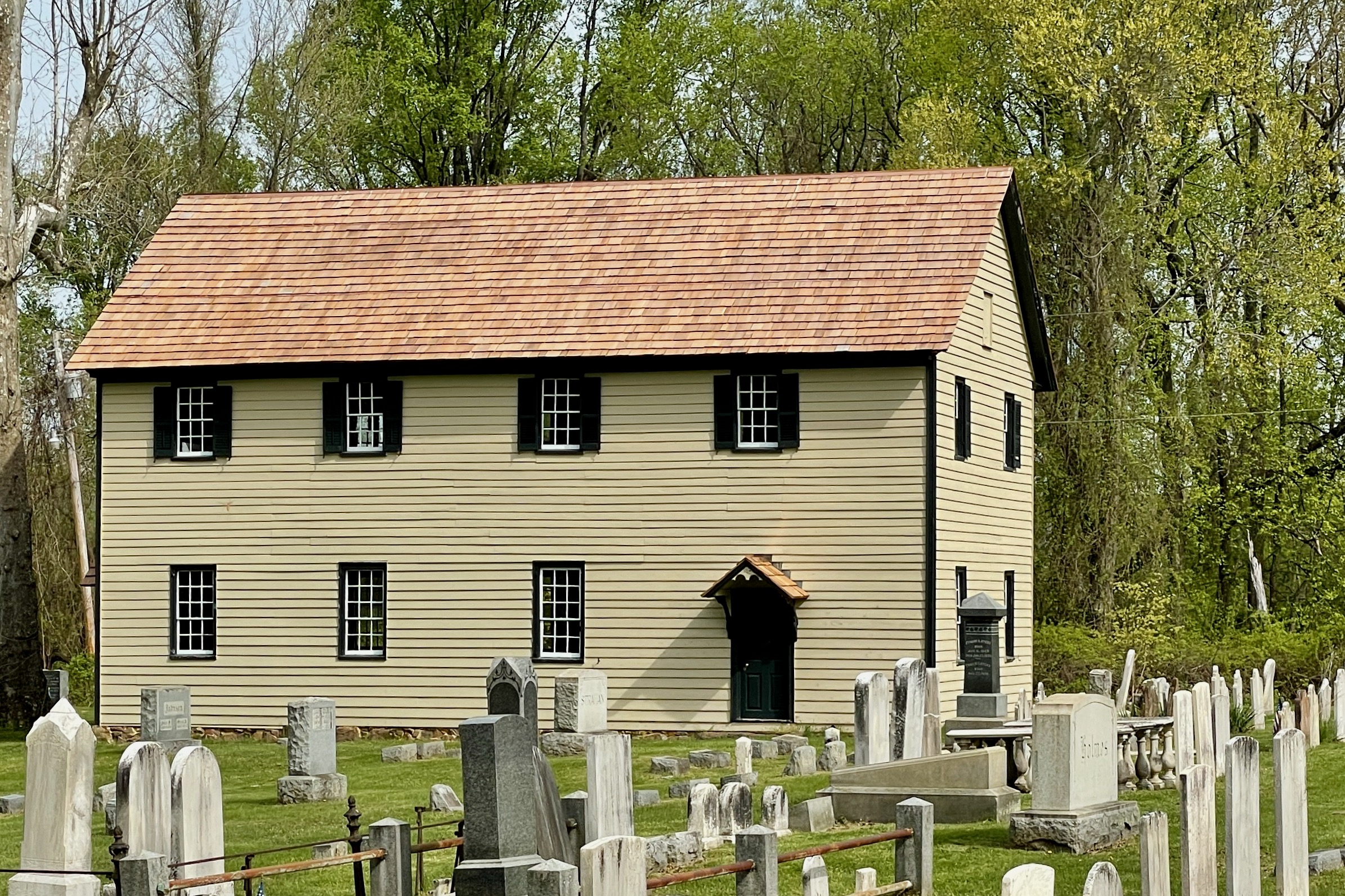
Ye Olde Yellow Meeting House and Cemetery

The Yellow Meeting House Cemetery is located in Red Valley, with several early settlers interred there.
