= New Jersey Legislative Council =

Historic upper house of the New Jersey Legislature

Type
- Type: Upper house of the New Jersey Legislature

Leadership
- President of Council: The Governor
- Vice-President of Council: Various

Structure
- Seats: 13-18
- Political groups: Federalist Party; Democratic-Republican Party; National Republican Party; Democratic Party; Whig Party

Meeting place
- New Jersey State House, Trenton, New Jersey

The New Jersey Legislative Council was the upper house of the New Jersey Legislature under the New Jersey Constitution of 1776. It replaced the New Jersey Provincial Council under colonial rule and was replaced by the New Jersey Senate under the Constitution of 1844.

From among the Council members, the legislature elected the governor of New Jersey, who served concurrently as president of the Council with a casting vote, and elected the vice-president of the Council to succeed to the office of governor if it was vacant.

== History ==
The Legislative Council was established under the New Jersey Constitution of 1776 to replace the New Jersey Provincial Council, which had been the upper house under colonial rule. The Provincial Council had consisted of up to twelve members, appointed by and serving at the pleasure of the British crown. As this created an overly aristocratic and non representative body, the framers of the 1776 state constitution provided for an elected Legislative Council, with one member elected in each county for a one-year term. At the time of ratification, there were thirteen counties in New Jersey; this number increased to eighteen by 1844.

This structure would remain in place until the New Jersey Constitution of 1844, when the Legislative Council would be replaced by the New Jersey Senate, which retained the Council's system of apportionment until it was ruled unconstitutional by the Supreme Court of the United States in 1965.

== Composition ==
The Constitution of 1776 provided for a bicameral legislature consisting of a General Assembly with three members from each county and a Legislative Council with one member from each county. Each Legislative Council Term was one year, and elections were held annually. Members were required to be "an inhabitant and freeholder in the county in which he is chosen, and worth at least one thousand pounds proclamation money, of real and personal estate, within the same county".

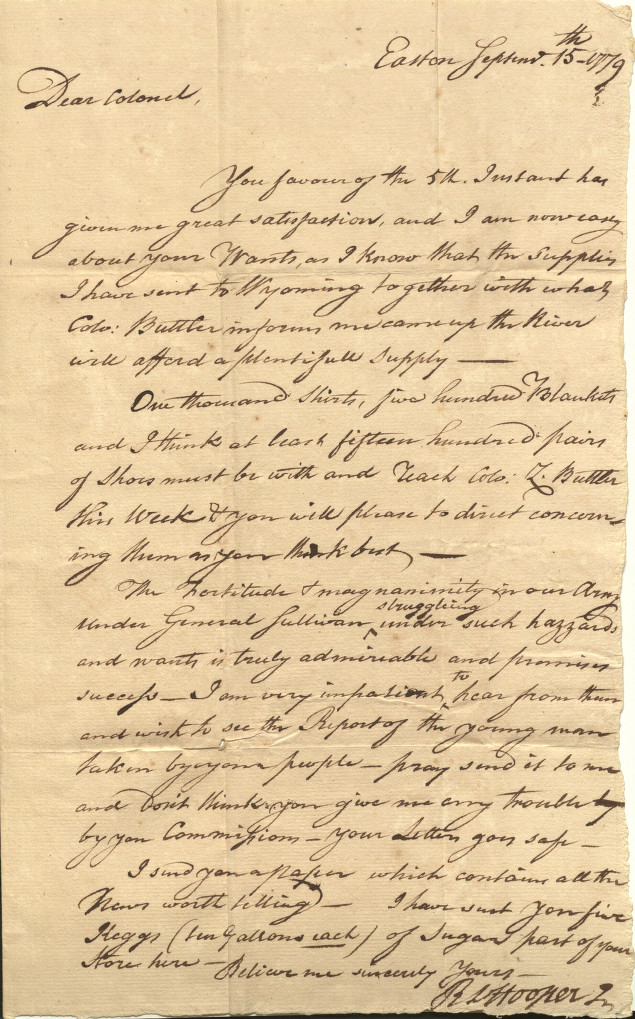
Letter from Robert Hooper to Israel Shreve, 1779

== Powers ==
The Constitution of 1776 set up a fusion of powers system of state government, which allowed for an overlap of executive, legislative and judicial authority.

All state officials, including the governor, were appointed by the Legislature. The Vice-President of Council would succeed the governor (who was the president of the Council) if a vacancy occurred in that office. The governor was elected to a one-year term by the Legislative Council and the General Assembly — in joint meeting — and served, with casting vote, as the President of the Council. The Legislative Council itself chose one of its members to be Vice-President of Council who would succeed if a vacancy occurred in the Governor's office.

In addition to electing the Governor, the Legislative Council and the General Assembly — in joint meeting — chose the Judges of the New Jersey Supreme Court, Judges of the Inferior Court of Common Pleas, Justices of the Peace, Clerks of the Supreme Court, County Clerks, Attorney General, and Secretary of State.

Under the fusion of powers system, the Governor and Council comprised the Court of Appeals, "in the last resort", continuing the system in use under colonial rule. Three or more Members of the Legislative Council were to be a privy council to the Governor.

Under the 1776 constitution, the Legislative Council had the same powers as the Assembly in the introduction and passage of bills, with the exception that the Council could not "prepare or alter any money bill"; that authority was left to the Assembly alone. Sessions of the Legislative Council could only be convened while the Assembly was sitting. The Speaker of the Assembly was required to notify the Governor or Vice President of Council at each adjournment of the lower house of the time at which it would reconvene.

== List of past vice-presidents of Council ==
The following is a list of past vice-presidents of the New Jersey Legislative Council from the adoption of the 1776 State Constitution.

- 1776-81: John Stevens, Hunterdon
- 1782: John Cox, Burlington
- 1783-84: Philemon Dickinson, Hunterdon
- 1785-88: Robert Lettis Hooper, Jr., Hunterdon
- 1789-92: Elisha Lawrence, Monmouth (acting Governor 1790)
- 1793-94: Thomas Henderson, Monmouth (acting Governor 1793 & 1794)
- 1795: Elisha Lawrence, Monmouth
- 1796-97: James Linn, Somerset
- 1798-1800: George Anderson, Burlington
- 1801-04: John Lambert, Hunterdon (acting Governor 1802-03)
- 1805: Thomas Little, Monmouth
- 1806: George Anderson, Burlington
- 1807: Ebenezer Elmer, Cumberland
- 1808: Ebenezer Seeley, Cumberland
- 1809: Thomas Ward, Essex
- 1810-11: Charles Clark, Essex (acting Governor 1812)
- 1812: James Schureman, Middlesex
- 1813: Charles Clark, Essex
- 1814-15: William Kennedy, Sussex (acting Governor 1815)
- 1816-22: Jesse Upson, Morris
- 1823-25: Peter J. Stryker, Somerset
- 1826: Ephraim Bateman, Cumberland
- 1827: Silas Cook, Morris
- 1828: Caleb Newbold, Burlington
- 1829-30: Edward Condict, Morris
- 1831-32: Elias P. Seeley, Cumberland (acting Governor 1833)
- 1833: Mahlon Dickerson, Morris
- 1834: Jehu Patterson, Monmouth
- 1835: Charles Sitgreaves, Warren
- 1836: Jeptha B. Munn, Morris
- 1837-38: Andrew Parsons, Passaic
- 1839-40: Joseph Porter, Gloucester
- 1841: John Cassedy, Bergen
- 1842: William Chetwood, Essex
- 1843: James Patterson, Monmouth
- (1844 elections were for the new New Jersey Senate that met in January 1845)
