= Robert Lettis Hooper =

American judge

Member of the New Jersey General Assembly from the Somerset County district
- In office 1721–1725 Serving with Thomas Leonard

Chief Justice of the New Jersey Supreme Court
- In office January 2, 1724 – 1728
- Preceded by: William Trent
- Succeeded by: Thomas Farmar
- In office 1729–1738/39
- Preceded by: Thomas Farmar
- Succeeded by: Robert Hunter Morris

Personal details
- Born: Christ Church, Barbados
- Died: c February 1738/39
- Spouse: Sarah Graham
- Children: Robert Lettis, James, Isabella
- Occupation: Merchant

Robert Lettis Hooper or Robert Lettice Hooper (died 1738/39) was a chief justice of the New Jersey Supreme Court.

== Biography ==
Robert Lettis Hooper was a son of Daniel Hooper, a native of Barbados.

A merchant in New York City, he subsequently relocated to New Jersey. He was Warden of St. Peter's Church, Perth Amboy in 1726, and Vestryman from 1734 to 1738.

Robert Lettis Hooper was elected to the eighth New Jersey General Assembly (1721-1725 Legislative Session), representing the Somerset County Constituency. He was commissioned as Chief Justice of the New Jersey Supreme Court on January 1, 1724/5 (O. S.) and took the bench on March 30, 1725. Hooper would serve as Chief Justice until his death, with the exception of a brief interruption in 1728, when Gov. William Burnet had named Thomas Farmar to the post; Hooper was reinstated the following year.

One of the more prominent cases heard by the Hooper Court was Lithgow v. Schuyler in 1734, in which the East New Jersey Proprietors attempt to oust a settler from land in Elizabethtown was defeated by a jury.

On November 16, 1738 he was commissioned of the New Jersey Provincial Council, but would only serve briefly before his death.

Robert Lettis Hooper made his will on January 27, 1738; it was proved February 19, 1738/39.

== Family ==
Hooper married Mrs. Sarah Graham in 1701 in New York. They had three children including Robert Lettis, James and Isabella. A grandson, Robert Lettis Hooper, Jr., would serve the Patriot cause in the American Revolutionary War, and would serve as Vice President of the New Jersey Legislative Council.
