= Richard Howell =

American politician (1754–1802)

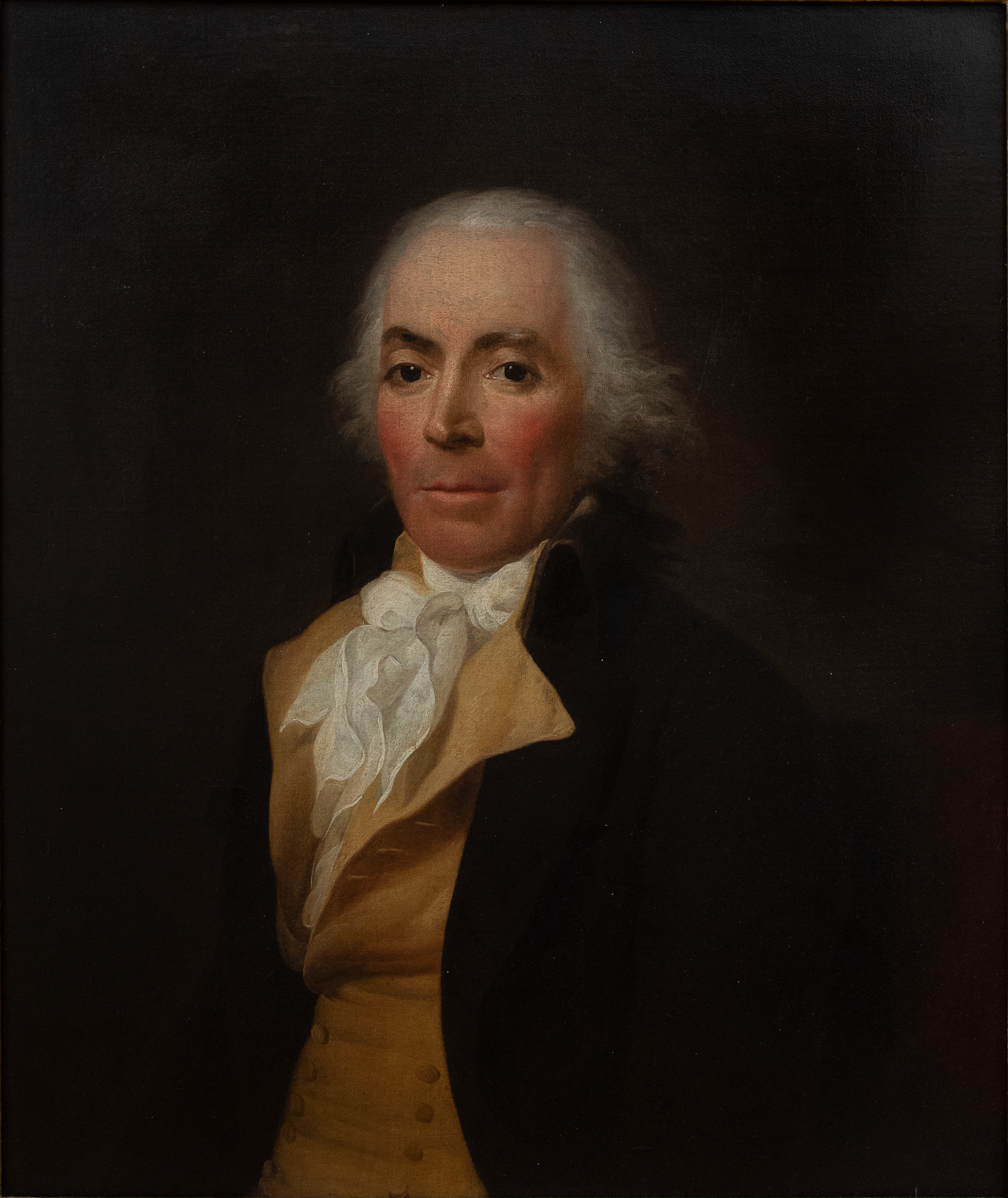

3rd Governor of New Jersey
- In office June 3, 1793 – October 31, 1801
- Preceded by: Thomas Henderson (acting)
- Succeeded by: Joseph Bloomfield

Personal details
- Born: October 25, 1754 Newark, Colony of Delaware, British America
- Died: April 28, 1802 (aged 47) Trenton, New Jersey, U.S.
- Spouse: Keziah Burr Howell

Richard Howell (October 25, 1754 – April 28, 1802) was the third governor of New Jersey from 1793 to 1801.

== Early life and military career ==
Howell was born in Newark, in the Colony of Delaware, and was the son of Ebenezer Howell and grandson of Welsh immigrant Reynold Howell, who settled in Newark, Delaware c. 1724.. He was a lawyer and soldier of the early United States Army. He served as captain and later major of the 2nd New Jersey Regiment from 1775 to 1779. Richard was a twin, his twin brother was Lewis Howell. Lewis was a physician for the 2nd New Jersey Regiment and died during the Revolutionary War.

== Politics ==
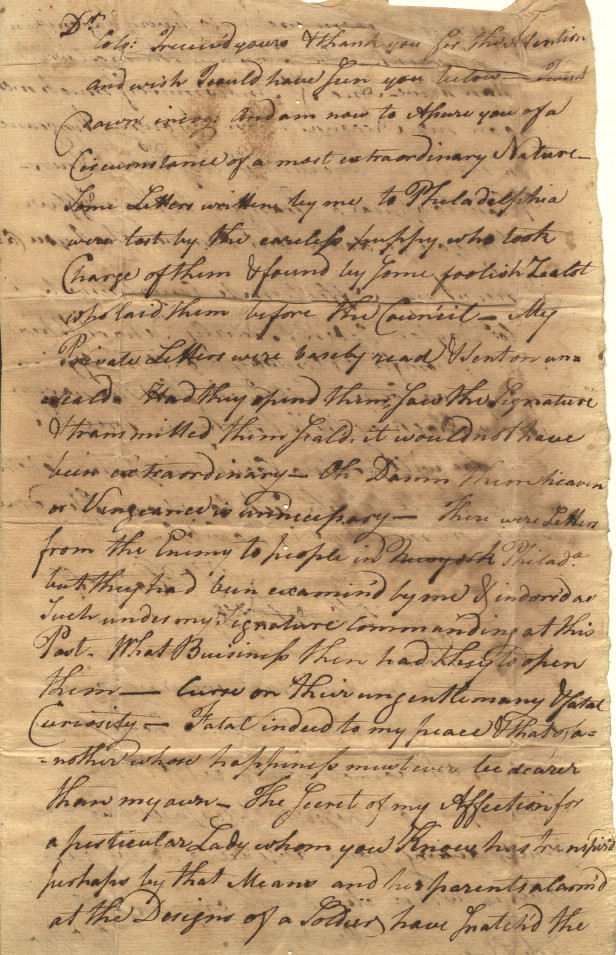
Letter from Major Richard Howell to Israel Shreve, 1778

At the conclusion of the Revolutionary War, Howell was admitted as an original member of The Society of the Cincinnati in the state of New Jersey.

Richard was offered the role of judge advocate of the army, but turned down the appointment to practice law. He was clerk of the New Jersey Supreme Court from 1778 to June 3, 1793. He succeeded Thomas Henderson as Governor and served until 1801. Replaced as Governor by Joseph Bloomfield, Howell died the following year. He was the grandfather of Varina Howell, the second wife of Confederate President Jefferson Davis.

== Death ==
Howell died in Trenton, New Jersey, on April 28, 1802, and was buried in that city's Friends Burying Ground. Howell Township in Monmouth County is named in his honor.

Political offices
Preceded by Thomas Henderson; Acting Governor	Governor of New Jersey; June 3, 1793 – October 31, 1801	Succeeded by Joseph Bloomfield
