= Ebenezer Seeley =

American lawyer and politician (1793–1866)

Member of the Connecticut Senate from the 4th district
- In office 1834–183?

Mayor of New Haven, Connecticut
- In office 1832–1833

Personal details
- Born: April 9, 1793 Wilton, Connecticut, U.S.
- Died: January 23, 1866 (aged 72) Sing Sing, New York, U.S.
- Spouse(s): Elizabeth Titus (died) Alice Glover (died 1844)
- Children: 2
- Education: Yale College
- Occupation: Lawyer; politician

Ebenezer Seeley (April 9, 1793 – January 23, 1866) was an American lawyer and politician.

== Early life ==
Ebenezer Seeley was born on April 9, 1793, in Wilton, Connecticut, to Ebenezer Seeley. He graduated from Yale College in 1814. He studied law under Seth Perkins Staples of New Haven and afterwards with Roger Minott Sherman in Fairfield.

== Career ==
Seeley began practicing law in Fairfield and then moved to Bridgeport. In 1825, he moved to New Haven and was mayor of New Haven from 1832 to 1833.

In 1834, Seeley was elected to the Connecticut State Senate, from the 4th Senatorial District, the same district William W. Boardman, another New Haven lawyer, had represented immediately beforehand from 1830 to 1832. In 1837, he removed to New York, where he continued practicing law until his death. During the Civil War, he supported the Union cause and donated to various war charities.

== Personal life ==
Seeley married Elizabeth Titus, daughter of John Titus, of Flushing, New York. She died when he lived in Bridgeport. They had two sons, including John T. He married Alice Glover, daughter of John I. Glover, of New York. She died in 1844. He was familiar with the classics.

Seeley died on January 23, 1866, in Sing Sing, New York.
