= John Ogden (colonist) =

New England colonist (1609–1682)

John Ogden (19 September 1609 – 30 May 1682), known as "The Pilgrim", was an early settler in New England, originally on Long Island, and an original patentee of the Elizabethtown Purchase, "the first English settlement in the Colony of New Jersey".

Coat of arms of John Ogden

== Early life ==
John Ogden was born in England on 19 September 1609, and emigrated to New England in 1641. His parentage and town of birth are unknown. Previous histories showing that he was born in Hampshire are unfounded and were the result of a fraudulent genealogy created by Gustave Anjou in the early 1900s. Almost all the John Ogdens of his time were born in the north of England, especially Lancashire.

== English America ==
After arriving in the American Colony around 1640, he moved to Stamford, Connecticut, then called Rippowam, where he constructed a dam and grist mill. In 1642, he built "the first permanent stone church in Fort Amsterdam," a Dutch settlement at the southern tip of what is now Manhattan Island. In 1644 he relocated to Long Island, where "he established the first commercial whaling enterprise in America."

In 1665, he became a patentee of the Elizabethtown Purchase in present-day Elizabeth, New Jersey, where he lived until his death in 1682.

== Personal life ==
While still in England, Ogden married Jane Bond (1616–1682) on May 8, 1637. Together, the couple had six children:

- John Ogden Jr. (1638–1702)
- David Ogden (1639–1692), who married Elizabeth Swaine in 1676
- Joseph Ogden (1642–c. 1690), who married Sarah Whitehead
- Jonathan Ogden (1646–1732), who married Rebekah Wood
- Benjamin Ogden (1653–1722)
- Mary Ogden (1643-1675)

Ogden died in Elizabeth, New Jersey, on 30 May 1682. He is buried in what is now the First Presbyterian Churchyard in Elizabeth.

=== Legacy and descendants ===
A 1907 book The Ogden family in America, Elizabethtown branch, and their English ancestry; John Ogden, the Pilgrim, and his descendants, 1640–1906 by William Ogden Wheeler, is very full and accurate for events after their arrival in America, quoting many original documents, but has the fraudulent genealogy mentioned above.

No fewer than eight of his descendants with the surname Ogden appear in the Dictionary of American Biography, besides many with other surnames. Two members of the Ogden family appear as millionaires in the American Millionaire Registry of 1892, making them billionaires in 2022 money.

His descendants include :

- Abraham Ogden (1743–1798), colonel, U.S. Attorney for the District of New Jersey, negotiator of the Treaty of New York (1796)
- Samuel Ogden (1746–1810), entrepreneur, brother-in-law of Founding Father Gouverneur Morris
- Aaron Ogden (1756–1839), United States Senator and 5th Governor of New Jersey
- Josiah Ogden Hoffman (1766-1837), New York Attorney General
- David A. Ogden (1770–1829), died in Montreal, Entrepreneur and Congressman, partner of Founding Father Alexander Hamilton
- Peter Skene Ogden (1790–1854), born in Quebec, Canada, was a British-Canadian fur trader, under the company of John Jacob Astor
- Caleb Ogden Halsted (1792–1860), merchant and banker who was a president of the Bank of the Manhattan Company
- William Butler Ogden (1805–1877), 1st Mayor of Chicago, was one of the richest men in Chicago
- Robert N. Ogden Jr. (1839–1905), lieutenant colonel, father-in-law of the Mayor of Chicago Carter Harrison IV

Descendants of his brother Richard Sr. of Fairfield include:

- Darius Ogden Mills, banker, at one time the richest man in California
- Ogden Mills, financier, husband of Ruth T. Livingston, granddaughter of Maturin Livingston, Livingston family
- Ogden Livingston Mills, U.S. Treasury Secretary of President Herbert Hoover, replacing Andrew Mellon
- Ogden Mills Reid, president of the New York Herald Tribune, family of the Phipps of Old Westbury Gardens
