= Richard Stockton (senator) =

American politician 1764–1828

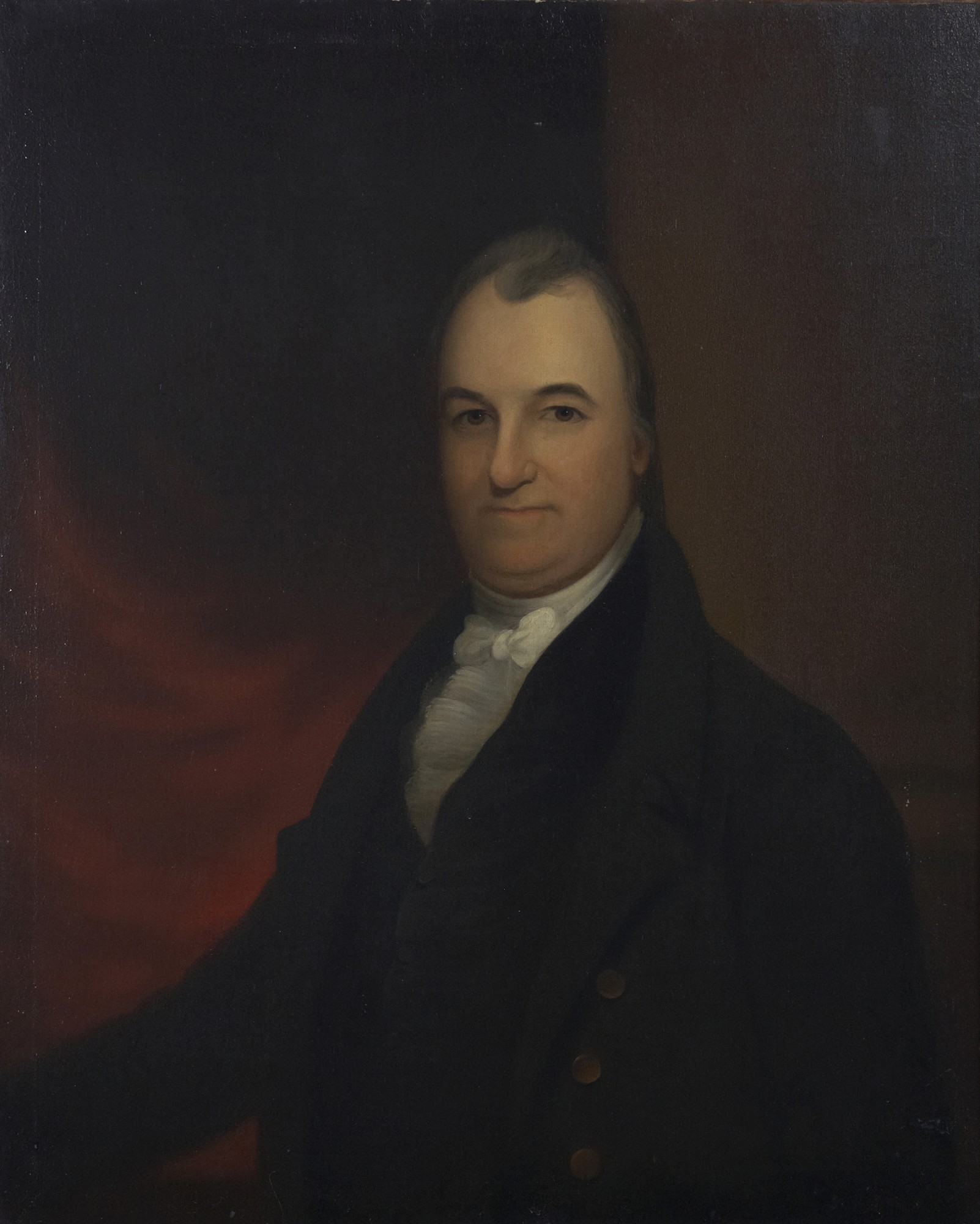

Member of the U.S. House of Representatives from New Jersey's 2nd district
- In office March 4, 1813 – March 3, 1815 Serving with James Schureman
- Preceded by: Adam Boyd; Lewis Condict; Jacob Hufty; George C. Maxwell; James Morgan; Thomas Newbold
- Succeeded by: Benjamin Bennet; Henry Southard

United States Senator from New Jersey
- In office November 12, 1796 – March 3, 1799
- Preceded by: Frederick Frelinghuysen
- Succeeded by: Jonathan Dayton

United States Attorney for the District of New Jersey
- In office 1789–1791
- President: George Washington
- Preceded by: Office established
- Succeeded by: Abraham Ogden

Personal details
- Born: April 17, 1764 Princeton, New Jersey, British America
- Died: March 7, 1828 (aged 63) Princeton, New Jersey, U.S.
- Party: Federalist
- Education: Princeton University (BA)

Richard Stockton (April 17, 1764 – March 7, 1828) was a lawyer who represented New Jersey in the United States Senate and later served in the United States House of Representatives. He was the first U.S. Attorney for the District of New Jersey, holding that office from 1789 to 1791, and ran unsuccessfully for vice president in the 1820 election as a member of the Federalist Party, which did not nominate a candidate for president.

== Life ==
Stockton was born in Princeton, New Jersey, the son of Richard Stockton, a signer of the Declaration of Independence. He was tutored privately, and graduated from the College of New Jersey (now Princeton University) in 1779. He studied law, was admitted to the bar in 1784 and commenced practice in Princeton.

Stockton was a presidential elector in the 1792 and 1800 presidential elections. He was elected as a Federalist to the United States Senate to fill the vacancy caused by the resignation of Frederick Frelinghuysen and served from November 12, 1796, to March 4, 1799, but declined to be a candidate for reelection. He was an unsuccessful candidate for Governor of New Jersey in 1801, 1803, and 1804. He was elected as a Federalist to the Thirteenth Congress, serving from March 4, 1813, to March 3, 1815, and declined to be a candidate for renomination to the Fourteenth Congress.

Stockton was elected a member of the American Antiquarian Society in 1815.

After leaving Congress, he resumed the practice of his profession. He died at Morven, near Princeton, and was interred in Princeton Cemetery in Princeton.

== Family ==
In 1788, Stockton married Mary Field (1766–1837). They were the parents of nine children, including Mary Field, Richard, Julia, Robert Field, Horatio, Caroline, Samuel Witham, William Bradford, and Annis.

His brother Lucius Horatio Stockton served as U.S. Attorney for the District of New Jersey.

His son Commodore Robert F. Stockton was the Military Governor of California who defeated the Mexican army in 1846. He later became a senator from New Jersey like his father before him.

His daughter Annis Stockton was the first wife of U.S. Senator John Renshaw Thomson.

Legal offices
Preceded by Office established	United States Attorney for the District of New Jersey; 1789–1791	Succeeded by Abraham Ogden
U.S. Senate
Preceded by Frederick Frelinghuysen	U.S. Senator (Class 2) from New Jersey; 1796–1799; Served alongside: John Rutherfurd, Franklin Davenport	Succeeded by Jonathan Dayton
U.S. House of Representatives
Preceded by Adam Boyd; Lewis Condict; Jacob Hufty; George C. Maxwell; James Morgan; Thomas Newbold as Representatives at-large	Member of the U.S. House of Representatives from New Jersey's 2nd congressional district 1813–1815	Succeeded by Benjamin Bennet; Henry Southard as Representatives at-large
Party political offices
Preceded by John Eager Howard	Federalist nominee for Vice President of the United States; 1820	Party dissolved
