= Joshua Waddington =

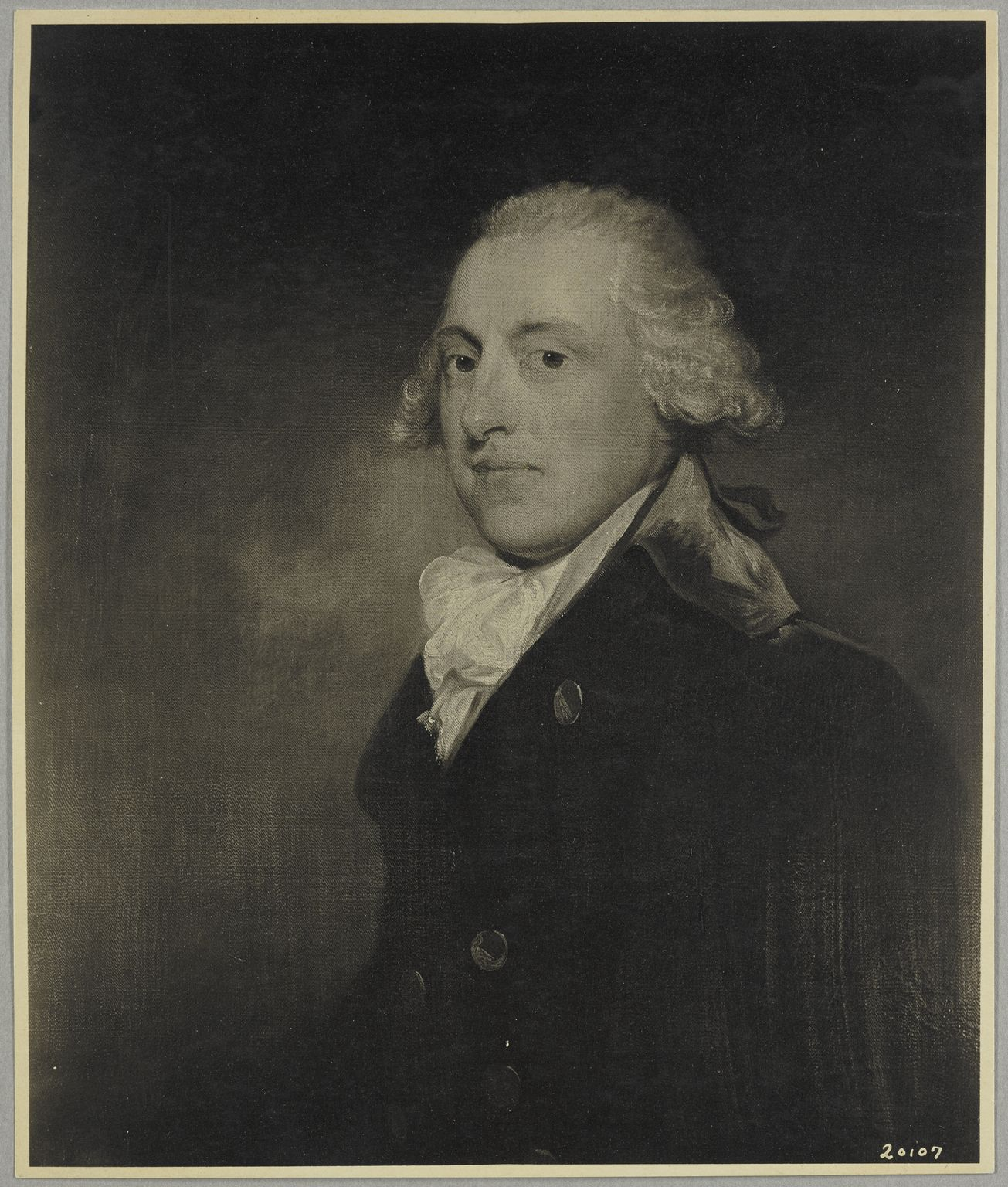
- Born: May 20, 1755; Walkeringham, England
- Died: March 6, 1844 (aged 88); New York City, United States
- Occupations: Founder of H. & J. Waddington & Co, Director of the Bank of New York (1787), and later President of the St. George's Society of New York
- Known for: Defendant in Rutgers v. Waddington trial
- Spouse: Gertrude Gouverneur Ogden (m. 1804)
- Children: 10
- Relatives: Samuel Waddington (brother); Abraham Ogden (father-in-law); David A. Ogden (brother-in-law); James Henry Monk (nephew)

Joshua Waddington (20 May 1755 – 6 March 1844) was a British-American who was one of the founders of the Saint George's Society, the Bank of New York, and was the defendant in the case Rutgers v. Waddington before New York City Mayor's Court.

== Early life ==
Waddington was born in 1755 to Rev. Joshua Waddington of Harworth and Walkeringham and Ann Ferrand of Messingham, who married in 1740. His mother was the daughter of Rev. Thomas Ferrand, Vicar of Bingley, Yorks. His father was a 1732 and 1752 graduate of Trinity College, Cambridge and was the Vicar of Walkeringham and Harworth and the Vicar of Mattersey in 1752.

He was one of eight sons born to Joshua and Ann, the others being Thomas (1742–1790), John (1744–1770), Benjamin (1749–1828), William (1751–1818), George (1753–1824), Samuel Ferrand (1759–1829), and Henry Waddington (1761–1938). His brother William was the grandfather of William Henry Waddington, who served as Prime Minister of France in 1879 and was the French Ambassador to the United Kingdom from 1883 to 1893. His sister Sarah, who married Charles Monk, was the mother of James Henry Monk, the Bishop of Gloucester and Bristol.

== Career ==
In 1776, Waddington moved from England to New York City to join his brothers William and Henry Waddington in Colonial America, becoming a United States citizen.

In partnership with his brother Henry, they operated a linen business through the firm of Henry Waddington & Co., in London, and Joshua Waddington & Co. in New York. Due to the War of 1812, the dissolved their partnership on December 31, 1812, which led to legal action against them in front of Judge Cornelius P. Van Ness.

In 1784, he was among the founders of the Bank of New York, along with Isaac Roosevelt, Samuel Franklin, Robert Browne, Comfort Sands, Thomas Randall, William Maxwell, Nicholas Low, "Grand Old" Daniel McCormick, John Vanderbilt, Thomas Stoughton, and Alexander Hamilton. Waddington was elected a director at the first meeting of the subscribers in 1784 and continued to serve until his retirement in 1843.

In 1792, he was one of the founders of Tontine Coffee House. He was also part of the Ogden Land Company which was run by his wife's family.

=== Rutgers v. Waddington ===
In 1783, the New York legislature enacted the Trespass Act which stripped Tories of their property and privileges and gave patriots the legal right to sue anyone who had occupied, damaged or destroyed homes they had left behind British lines during the war.

On June 29, 1784, the case of Rutgers v. Waddington was presented before chief justice James Duane. The plaintiff, Elizabeth Rutgers, represented by Egbert Benson, had owned a large brewery and alehouse that she was forced to abandon when the British occupied New York City. Under the new Trespass Act, Rutgers demanded rent in the sum of £8,000 from Waddington, who had been running the brewery since it was abandoned. Waddington defense was litigated by Alexander Hamilton, Brockholst Livingston, and Morgan Lewis, who posited that the Trespass Act violated the 1783 peace treaty ratified earlier by Congress. Duane ruled that Rutgers was only entitled to rent from the time before the British occupation and the two parties agreed to the amount of £800.

== Personal life ==
On November 6, 1804, Waddington married Gertrude Gouverneur Ogden, the daughter of Abraham Ogden and Sarah Frances Ludlow. They had ten children, eight girls and two boys, of which only one boy lived to maturity:

- Thomas Waddington (1805–1805), who died young
- Anne Ferrand Waddington (1806–1894), who married Dr. Jeremiah Van Rensselaer, in 1835, a grandson of Jeremiah Van Rensselaer, who climbed Mont Blanc in 1819.
- Sarah F. Waddington (1810–1903), who married Samuel Cornell Ogden, her first cousin, in 1843.
- William David Waddington (1811–1886), who married Mary Elizabeth Ogden, his first cousin, and was founder and president of the Gebbard Insurance Company.
- Catharine H. Waddington (1812–1813), who died young
- Gertrude D. Waddington (1813–1821), who died young
- Frances L. Waddington (1815–1834)
- Martha S. Waddington (1816–1877)
- Rebecca E. Waddington (1818–1845)
- Catharine B. Waddington (1820–1821), who died young

Waddington died on February 29, 1844.

=== Legacy ===
The town of Waddington, New York in St. Lawrence County, New York, United States, was named in his honor.
