= United States Congress in relation to the president and Supreme Court =

The U.S. Congress in relation to the president and Supreme Court has the role of chief legislative body of the United States. However, the Founding Fathers of the United States built a system in which three powerful branches of the government, using a series of checks and balances, could limit each other's power. As a result, it helps to understand how the United States Congress interacts with the presidency as well as the Supreme Court to understand how it operates as a group.

== Checks and balances ==
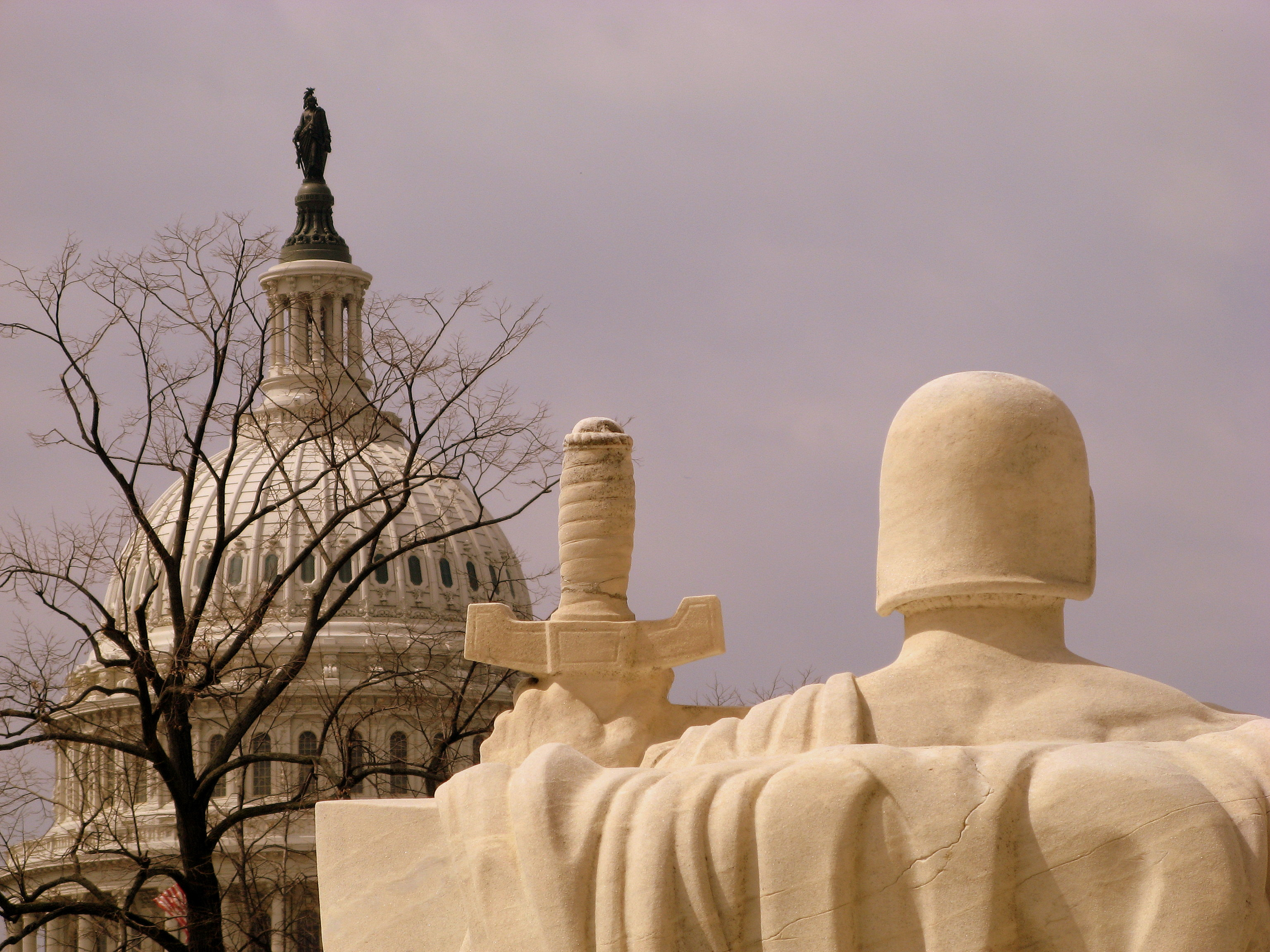
View of the United States Capitol from the United States Supreme Court building

Congressperson Lee Hamilton said of how Congress functions within American government:

To me the key to understanding it is balance. The founders went to great lengths to balance institutions against each other––balancing powers among the three branches: Congress, the president, and the Supreme Court; between the House of Representatives and the Senate; between the federal government and the states; among states of different sizes and regions with different interests; between the powers of government and the rights of citizens, as spelled out in the Bill of Rights ... no one part of government dominates the other.

The Constitution of the United States provides checks and balances among the three branches of the federal government. The authors of the Constitution expected the greater power to lie with Congress as described in Article One.

The influence of Congress on the presidency has varied from one period to another; the degree of power depending largely on the leadership of the Congress, political influence by the president, or other members of congress and the boldness of the president's initiatives. Under the first half-dozen presidents, power seems to have been evenly divided between the president and Congress, in part because early presidents largely restricted their vetoes to bills that were unconstitutional. In 1863, New York governor Horatio Seymour believed Congress to be the "most influential branch." The impeachment of Andrew Johnson made the presidency much less powerful than Congress. During the late 19th century, President Grover Cleveland aggressively attempted to restore the executive branch's power, vetoing over 400 bills during his first term, although historians today view Cleveland as exhibiting merely "boring, stolid competence."

The 20th and 21st centuries have seen the rise of the power of the Presidency under Theodore Roosevelt (1901–09), Woodrow Wilson (1913–21), Franklin D. Roosevelt (1933–45), Richard Nixon (1969–74), Ronald Reagan (1981–89), and George W. Bush (2001–09) (see Imperial Presidency). In recent years, Congress has restricted the powers of the President with laws such as the Congressional Budget and Impoundment Control Act of 1974 and the War Powers Resolution; nevertheless, the Presidency remains considerably more powerful than during the 19th century. Executive branch officials are often loath to reveal sensitive information to congresspersons because of possible concern that such information could not be kept secret; knowing they may be in the dark about executive branch activity, congressional officials are more likely to distrust their counterparts in executive agencies. Further, many government actions require fast coordinated effort by many agencies, and this is a task that Congress is ill-suited for. Congress is slow, open, divided, and not well matched to handle more rapid executive action or do a good job of overseeing such activity.

The Constitution concentrates removal powers in the Congress by empowering and obligating the House of Representatives to impeach federal officials (both executive and judicial) for "Treason, Bribery, or other high Crimes and Misdemeanors." The Senate is constitutionally empowered and obligated to try all impeachments. A simple majority in the House is required to impeach an official; however, a two-thirds majority in the Senate is required for conviction. A convicted official is automatically removed from office; in addition, the Senate may stipulate that the defendant be banned from holding office in the future.

Impeachment proceedings may not inflict more than this; however, the party may face criminal penalties in a normal court of law. In the history of the United States, the House of Representatives has impeached sixteen officials, of whom seven were convicted. (Another resigned before the Senate could complete the trial). Only three Presidents of the United States have ever been impeached: Andrew Johnson in 1868, Bill Clinton in 1999, and Donald Trump in 2019 and 2021. All trials ended in acquittal; in Johnson's case, the Senate fell one vote short of the two-thirds majority required for conviction. In 1974, Richard Nixon resigned from office after impeachment proceedings in the House Judiciary Committee indicated he would eventually be removed from office.

The Constitution entrusts certain powers to the Senate alone. The President may only nominate for appointment Cabinet officials, judges, and other high officers "by and with the advice and consent" of the Senate. The Senate confirms most presidential nominees, but rejections are not uncommon. Furthermore, treaties negotiated by the President must be ratified by a two-thirds majority vote in the Senate to take effect. As a result, presidential arm-twisting of senators can happen before a key vote; for example, President Obama's secretary of state, Hillary Clinton, urged her former senate colleagues to approve a nuclear arms treaty with Russia in 2010. The House of Representatives has no formal role in either the ratification of treaties or the appointment of federal officials, other than filling vacancies in the office of vice-president; a vote in each House is required to confirm a president's nomination for vice-president if a vacancy happens.

In 1803, the Supreme Court established judicial review of federal legislation in Marbury v. Madison, holding, however, that Congress could not grant unconstitutional power to the Court itself. The Constitution does not explicitly state that the courts may exercise judicial review; however, the notion that courts could declare laws unconstitutional was envisioned by the founding fathers. Alexander Hamilton, for example, mentioned and expounded upon the doctrine in Federalist No. 78. Originalists on the Supreme Court have argued that if the constitution doesn't say something explicitly it is unconstitutional to infer what it should, might or could have said. What this means is that the Supreme Court can nullify a congressional law. It is a huge check by the courts on the legislative authority and limits congressional power. In 1851, for example, the Supreme Court struck down provisions of a congressional act of 1820 in the Dred Scott decision. However, the Supreme Court can also extend congressional power through its constitutional interpretations.

Investigations are conducted to gather information on the need for future legislation, to test the effectiveness of laws already passed, and to inquire into the qualifications and performance of members and officials of the other branches. Committees may hold hearings, and, if necessary, compel individuals to testify when investigating issues over which it has the power to legislate by issuing subpoenas. Witnesses who refuse to testify may be cited for contempt of Congress, and those who testify falsely may be charged with perjury. Most committee hearings are open to the public (the House and Senate intelligence committees are the exception); important hearings are widely reported in the mass media. Transcripts of most hearings are published within two months of the actual meeting. Congress, in the course of studying possible laws and investigating matters, generates a large amount of information in various forms, and can be described as a publisher. It publishes congressional reports of two types: House and Senate reports, and Senate Executive Reports. It maintains databases which are updated irregularly with publications in a variety of electronic formats, including ASCII text and Portable Document Format (PDF) files.

Congress also plays a role in presidential elections. Both Houses meet in joint session on the sixth day of January following a presidential election to count the electoral votes, and there are procedures to follow if no candidate wins a majority.

The result of congressional activity is ultimately the creation of laws. It is a large body of rulings contained in the United States Code, arranged by subject matter alphabetically under fifty title headings. The idea of this code is to present the laws "in a concise and usable form".
