= Treaty of New York =

Treaty of New York may refer to:

- Treaty of New York (1790), between the United States and the Creek Indians
- Treaty of New York (1796), between New York State and the Seven Nations of Canada
- Treaty of New York (1826), on which see Ocmulgee National Monument
