= Unsuccessful nominations to the Cabinet of the United States =

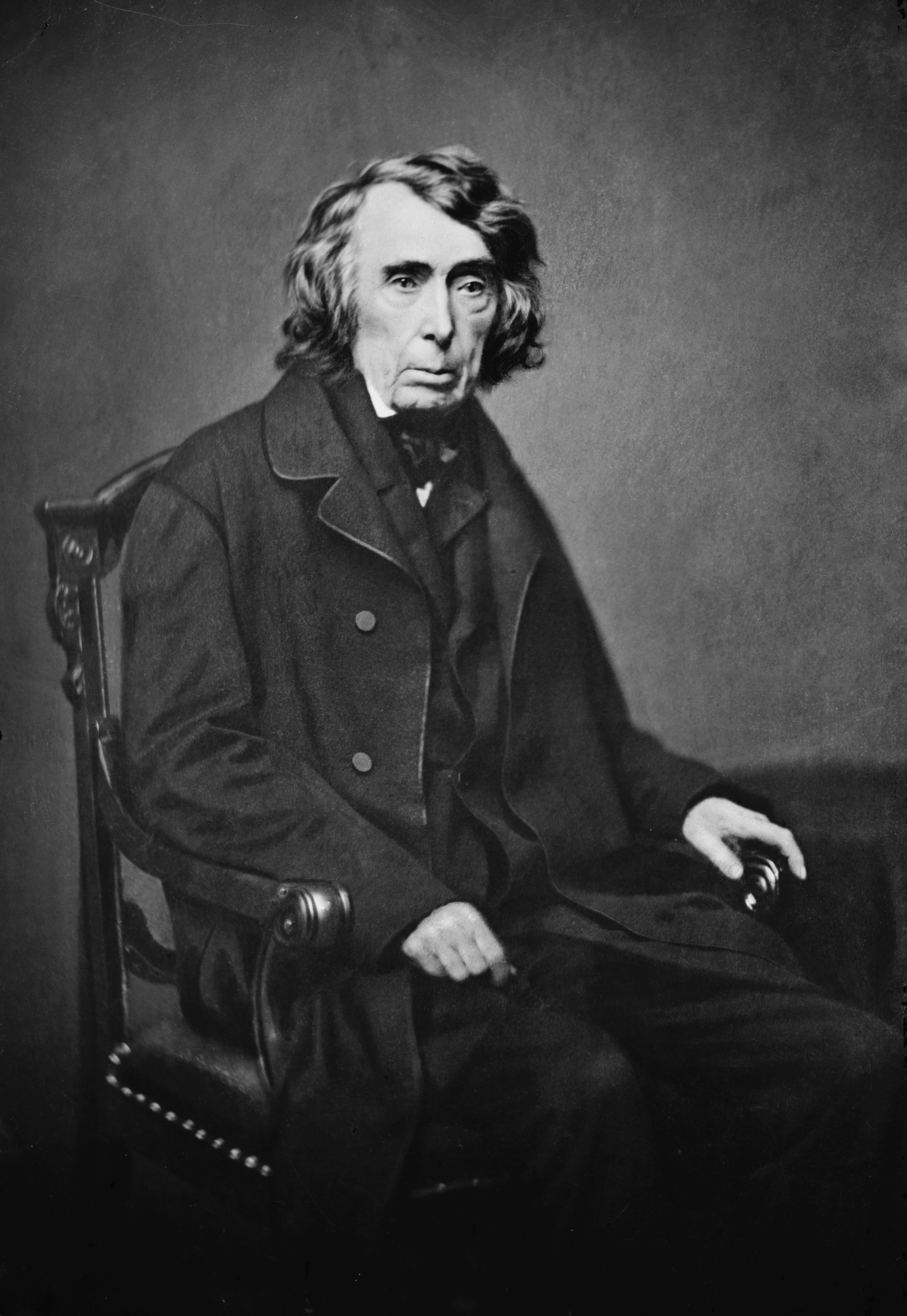
Roger B. Taney was the first nominee to a Cabinet position to be rejected.

Members of the Cabinet of the United States are nominated by the president and are then confirmed or rejected by the Senate. Listed below are unsuccessful cabinet nominees—that is, individuals who were nominated and who either declined their own nomination, failed the confirmation vote in the Senate, or whose nomination was withdrawn by the president. The latter category includes near nominations, meaning presumptive choices made by a president or president-elect that never progressed to formal nomination stage. Nominations to cabinet-rank positions are also included in this page.

To date, nine nominations to the cabinet have been rejected by the Senate. In addition, 19 nominations or near nominations have been withdrawn, either by the president or by the person chosen. President John Tyler holds the record for most cabinet nominees rejected by the Senate; four of his nominees failed to win confirmation.

== Rejected by the Senate ==
=== Andrew Jackson ===
==== Roger B. Taney ====
In 1833, President Andrew Jackson used a recess appointment to name Roger B. Taney, who was serving as Attorney General, as the Secretary of the Treasury. Jackson wanted Taney to help him dismantle the Second Bank of the United States. He helped Jackson draft a statement on the veto of the bank's renewal, and agreed to withdraw money from the bank. In an ensuing fight, the Senate rejected Taney by a vote of 18–28 in 1834.

=== John Tyler ===
==== Caleb Cushing ====
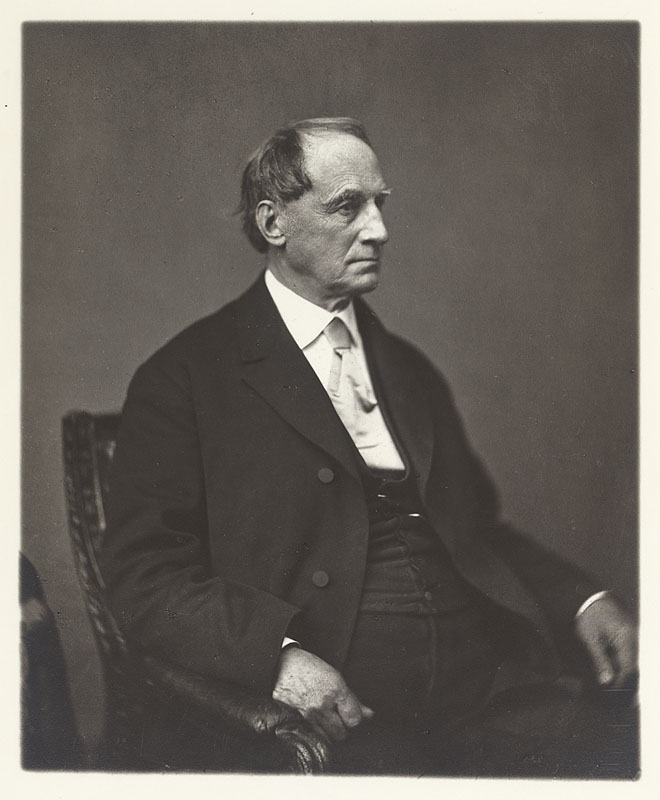
Caleb Cushing's Cabinet nomination was rejected three times in one day.

President John Tyler nominated Caleb Cushing for Secretary of the Treasury. Tyler had a contentious relationship with the Senate over his vetoes of legislation, and the Senate refused to confirm Cushing for this office on March 3, 1843 by a vote of 19–27. Tyler renominated Cushing twice more that day, and the Senate rejected his second and third nominations by votes of 10–27 and 2–29 respectively.

==== David Henshaw ====
David Henshaw became Secretary of the Navy in July 1843, following a recess appointment by Tyler. He was formally nominated in December 1843, and his nomination was rejected by a vote of 8–34 on January 15, 1844, after Navy officers, including future Admiral David Farragut, objected to Henshaw's plans to combat sectional divisions within the Navy by assigning Northerners to Southern naval posts and Southerners to Northern naval posts.

==== James S. Green ====
Tyler nominated James S. Green for Secretary of the Treasury in 1844. The nomination was rejected on June 15, 1844.

==== James Madison Porter ====
Tyler nominated James Madison Porter to be Secretary of War in 1844. The Senate rejected this nomination on January 30, 1844, by a vote of 3–38.

=== Andrew Johnson ===
==== Henry Stanbery ====
Henry Stanbery served as Attorney General for President Andrew Johnson. Stanbery resigned in 1868 to defend Johnson during his impeachment trial. After Johnson was acquitted, he nominated Stanbery to resume his tenure as Attorney General, but the Senate rejected the nomination, 11–29.

=== Calvin Coolidge ===
==== Charles B. Warren ====
President Calvin Coolidge nominated Charles B. Warren, a Michigan attorney, as Attorney General. The nomination was rejected on March 10, 1925, by a vote of 39–41. The lengthy and contentious debate on Warren's nomination consumed the first few days of the new Congress, as "Democrats and insurgent Republicans united to oppose the confirmation on the ground" that Warren's close association with the Sugar Trust made him unsuitable to enforce federal antitrust laws. The nomination originally stood at a 40–40 deadlock, but Vice President Charles G. Dawes did not arrive in the Senate chamber in time to use his tie-breaking vote before Senator Lee S. Overman of North Carolina switched his vote. Coolidge resubmitted the nomination to the Senate, but Warren was again rejected on March 16, by a vote of 39–46.

=== Dwight D. Eisenhower ===
==== Lewis Strauss ====
In 1959, President Dwight D. Eisenhower nominated Lewis Strauss as Secretary of Commerce in a recess appointment. Strauss had made enemies in the Senate during his tenure as Chair of the United States Atomic Energy Commission, including his controversial roles in the Oppenheimer security clearance hearing and the Dixon–Yates contract. Strauss lost the confirmation vote, 46–49. In July 1959, Strauss resigned.

=== George H. W. Bush ===
==== John Tower ====
In 1989, President George H. W. Bush nominated John Tower, a former United States Senator, to be Secretary of Defense. He was investigated over claims of drunkenness, womanizing, and ties with defense contractors. The Senate rejected Tower by a vote of 47–53. As of 2026, Tower is the most recent cabinet candidate to be rejected by the United States Senate.

== Withdrawn nominations or near nominations ==
=== John Adams ===
==== Lucius Horatio Stockton ====
In January 1801, during his lame-duck session, John Adams nominated Lucius Horatio Stockton to be Secretary of War. Stockton withdrew himself from consideration.

=== James Madison ===
==== Henry Dearborn ====
President James Madison nominated Henry Dearborn as Secretary of War in 1815. He had previously held the same position from 1801 to 1809 under Thomas Jefferson. However, Dearborn had failed as a general in the War of 1812. The Senate rejected Dearborn's nomination, but allowed him to withdraw.

=== Andrew Johnson ===
==== Thomas Ewing ====
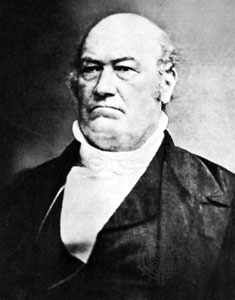
Thomas Ewing

In 1868, President Andrew Johnson forced Edwin Stanton, a Radical Republican who had served as Secretary of War since 1862, to resign from his cabinet, in violation of the 1867 Tenure of Office Act. Johnson then nominated Thomas Ewing. The Senate refused to consider Ewing's nomination, while they moved to impeach Johnson.

=== Bill Clinton ===
==== Zoë Baird ====
In 1993, President Bill Clinton nominated Zoë Baird to become his Attorney General. Before she could have a confirmation hearing, it became known that she had hired undocumented immigrant workers for her household, which became known as the "Nannygate" affair. Baird paid a civil penalty levied by the Immigration and Naturalization Service, and Clinton withdrew the nomination.

==== Kimba Wood ====
Kimba Wood became Clinton's second choice for Attorney General. She also hired an undocumented immigrant, though she did so before it was made illegal by the Immigration Reform and Control Act of 1986. She withdrew from consideration.

==== Bobby Ray Inman ====
Clinton selected Bobby Ray Inman to become his Secretary of Defense on December 16, 1993. Inman withdrew his nomination during a press conference on January 18, 1994, in which he accused William Safire, a columnist for The New York Times, of recruiting Senator Bob Dole to attack him, and claimed that Dole and Trent Lott intended to "turn up the heat" on his nomination. Dole and Lott denied this.

==== Anthony Lake ====
Clinton nominated Anthony Lake to become the Director of Central Intelligence in December 1996. He withdrew in March 1997, after questioning by the United States Senate Intelligence Committee turned contentious.

==== Hershel Gober ====
Clinton nominated Hershel Gober to become the Secretary of Veterans Affairs in 1997. When it became clear that the Senate Committee on Veterans' Affairs intended to use the confirmation hearings "to explore circumstances surrounding the exoneration of Mr. Gober after he was accused of sexual misconduct in 1993," Clinton withdrew the nomination.

=== George W. Bush ===
==== Linda Chavez ====
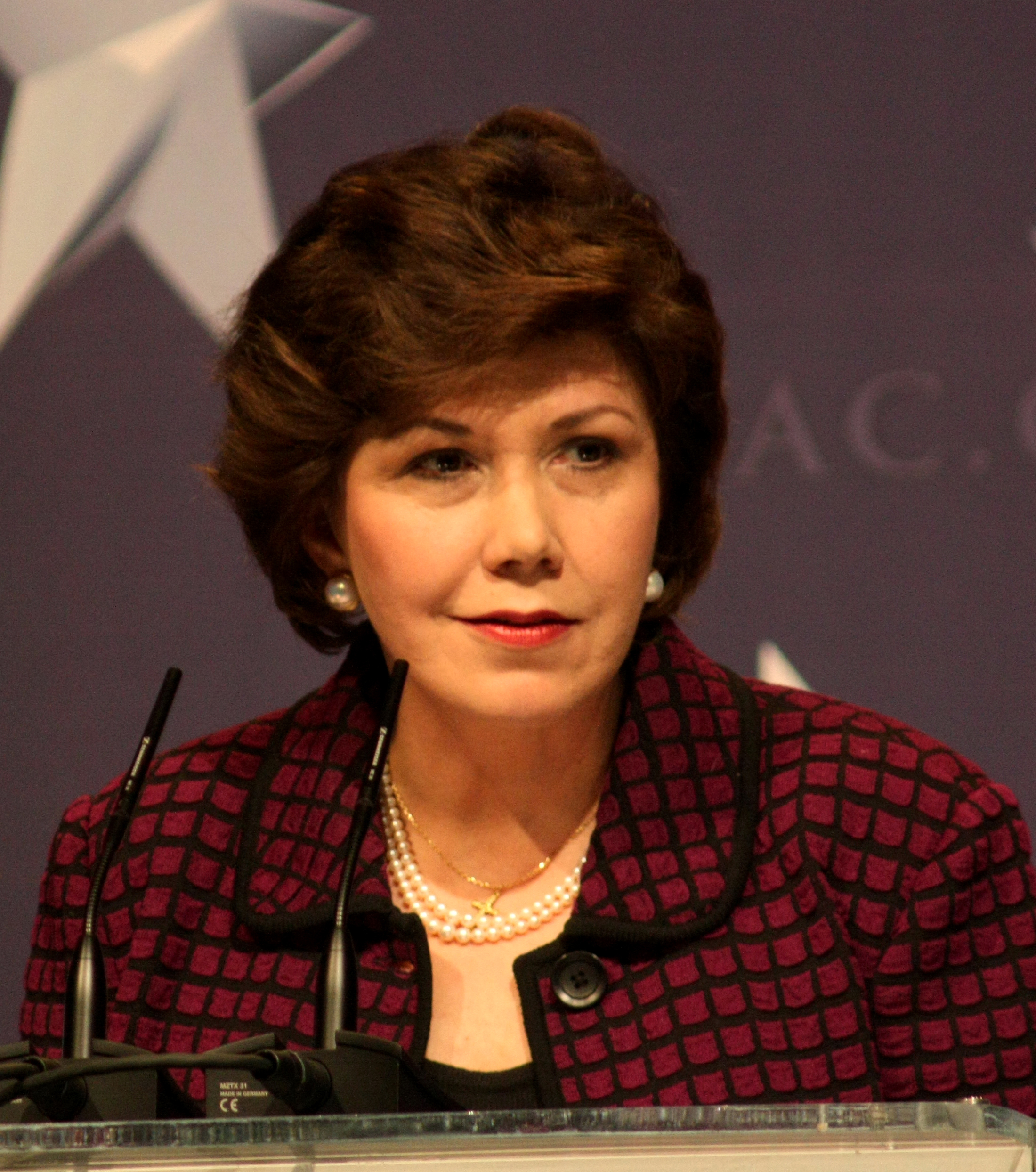
Linda Chavez

In 2001, President George W. Bush nominated Linda Chavez for Secretary of Labor. She withdrew from consideration after it was revealed that she had given money to a one-time undocumented immigrant who lived in her home more than a decade earlier. Chavez withdrew her nomination, but stated she never felt pressure from Bush's political team to do so.

==== Bernard Kerik ====
On December 3, 2004, President Bush nominated Bernard Kerik to become Secretary of Homeland Security. On December 10, Kerik withdrew from the nomination, after acknowledging that he had unknowingly hired an undocumented immigrant as a nanny and housekeeper.

=== Barack Obama ===
==== Tom Daschle ====
While still President-elect of the United States, Barack Obama chose Tom Daschle to be his Secretary of Health and Human Services. He withdrew in February 2009 over having $140,000 in unpaid taxes.

==== Bill Richardson ====
On December 3, 2008, Obama chose Bill Richardson to be his Secretary of Commerce. On January 4, 2009, Richardson withdrew his name from consideration because of a federal grand jury investigation into pay-to-play allegations. Later that year, the investigation ended and Richardson and his staff members were cleared of any wrongdoing.

==== Judd Gregg ====
Following Richardson's withdrawal, Obama nominated Republican Judd Gregg to be his Secretary of Commerce. On February 12, 2009, Gregg withdrew his name from consideration for the position, citing disagreements with Obama on issues surrounding the United States Census and the stimulus bill.

=== Donald Trump (first term) ===
==== Andrew Puzder ====
On December 8, 2016, President-elect Donald Trump nominated Andrew Puzder as his Secretary of Labor. Puzder had difficulty divesting himself from his company, CKE Restaurants. A workers group alleged that he had committed wage theft and sexual harassment against his employees, and he admitted to having hired an undocumented immigrant worker as a nanny without paying taxes for her. An Oprah Winfrey tape from 1990 featured his first wife describing spousal abuse that he allegedly committed. In reaction to public coverage of the tape, his former wife said she had been "misled by faulty advice" during her divorce proceedings, and had subsequently "fully" withdrawn those allegations in 1990. She was adamant that Puzder was "not abusive or violent".

On February 15, Senate Majority Leader Mitch McConnell informed the Trump administration that Puzder did not have the votes required to be confirmed and Puzder withdrew himself from consideration the same day.

==== Ronny Jackson ====
President Trump fired David Shulkin as Secretary of Veterans Affairs on March 28, 2018, and nominated Ronny Jackson, serving as Physician to the President, to succeed him. Senators expressed skepticism of the nomination due to Jackson's lack of management experience.

Current and former employees on the White House Medical Unit accused Jackson of creating a hostile work environment, excessive drinking on the job, and improperly dispensing medication. Amid these reports, the U.S. Senate Committee on Veterans' Affairs postponed Jackson's confirmation hearings on April 23. Jackson withdrew his nomination on April 26.

==== Patrick Shanahan ====
On December 20, 2018, General Jim Mattis announced his resignation as Secretary of Defense over differences in Syria policy, leaving office on January 1, 2019. White House Press Secretary Sarah Sanders announced on May 9 that Deputy Secretary of Defense Patrick M. Shanahan would be nominated to succeed Mattis, praising his "outstanding service to the country and his demonstrated ability to lead."

President Trump announced on June 18 that he would not be formally nominating Shanahan "so that he can devote more time to his family" following reports of domestic violence; his then-wife and son were arrested in 2010 and 2011 respectively on allegations of assault. Shanahan called the incidents a "tragedy" and said further public attention would "ruin my son's life."

==== John Ratcliffe ====
On July 28, 2019, President Trump announced that Dan Coats would be departing the cabinet-rank post of Director of National Intelligence and he would be nominating U.S. Representative John Ratcliffe to replace Coats. Richard Burr, the Republican chair of the Senate Intelligence Committee, was reported to have warned the White House that he considered Ratcliffe to be "too political". On August 2, Trump announced that he would not be nominating Ratcliffe, complaining that Ratcliffe was "being treated very unfairly by the LameStream Media". He was criticized for a lack of intelligence experience and exaggerations on his résumé. He had received little support from Senators of either party.

On February 28, 2020, Trump announced Ratcliffe's nomination to be Director of National Intelligence again, replacing acting director Richard Grenell and calling Ratcliffe an "outstanding man of great talent!" He was confirmed by the Senate on May 21.

=== Joe Biden ===
==== Neera Tanden ====
On November 30, 2020, President-elect Joe Biden announced that Neera Tanden would be his nominee for Director of the Office of Management and Budget. Immediately following the announcement, Tanden deleted over 1,000 of her previous tweets, and changed her Twitter bio from "progressive" to "liberal." During the confirmation hearing, Tanden apologized for several of her tweets attacking Republican senators, including tweets calling Susan Collins "the worst," comparing Ted Cruz to vampires, and using the nickname "Moscow Mitch" for Mitch McConnell and comparing him to Lord Voldemort. Senator John Cornyn described Tanden as "radioactive" in contrast to other Biden nominees he felt were more acceptable, while Senator John Kennedy stated that she "called Senator Sanders everything but an ignorant slut." NPR described her as "Biden's most controversial Cabinet pick."

In February 2021, Democratic Senator Joe Manchin said he opposed her nomination due to "overtly partisan statements" in the past, putting her approval in doubt due to the 50–50 split in the Senate between both parties. Other moderate senators, including Susan Collins, Rob Portman, Mitt Romney, and Pat Toomey said they would also vote against Tanden's nomination. Collins cited Tanden's deletion of over 1,000 of her tweets after the announcement of her nomination for a reason why she would not vote to confirm her which, according to Collins, "raises concerns about her commitment to transparency." Senate panels which were set to vote on her nomination postponed consideration. On March 2, 2021, the White House withdrew Tanden's name from consideration at her request.

=== Donald Trump (second term) ===
==== Matt Gaetz ====
On November 13, 2024, President-elect Trump announced he would nominate Matt Gaetz, a member of the U.S. House of Representatives from Florida's 1st congressional district, to serve as United States attorney general. Gaetz resigned from the U.S. House of Representatives shortly after the announcement. His nomination was negatively received by multiple Senate Republicans, several of whom indicated that they would not support it due to standing allegations that Gaetz had raped a minor and perceived lack of qualifications. Gaetz announced on X that he was withdrawing his name from consideration as attorney general on November 21, citing the fact that his nomination was becoming a distraction for the Trump transition.

==== Elise Stefanik ====
On November 11, 2024, Trump nominated Elise Stefanik, the U.S. representative from New York's 21st congressional district, and Chair of the House Republican Conference, to serve as United States Ambassador to the United Nations. Stefanik's nomination was never considered to be in serious jeopardy, and even won bipartisan support with the endorsement of Democratic Senator John Fetterman. However, with the resignations of Matt Gaetz and National Security Advisor Mike Waltz, Republicans were left with 218 House seats, the exact number needed for a functioning majority. While Gaetz, Waltz, and Stefanik all hailed from Republican districts, the White House was still cautious about the majority's small size. On March 28, 2025, Trump announced he had asked Stefanik to withdraw her nomination, and that she had agreed. At the same time, Trump praised Stefanik and expressed interest in her joining his Administration at a later time.

== Table ==
Unsuccessful nominations and near nominations to the Cabinet of the United States
Person chosen	Position	Year	Chosen by	Outcome
Lucius Horatio Stockton	War	1801	John Adams	Withdrawn
Henry Dearborn	War	1815	James Madison	Withdrawn
Roger B. Taney	Treasury	1834	Andrew Jackson	Rejected, 18–28
Caleb Cushing	Treasury	1843	John Tyler	1st time: Rejected, 19–27
Caleb Cushing	Treasury	1843	John Tyler	2nd time: Rejected, 10–27
Caleb Cushing	Treasury	1843	John Tyler	3rd time: Rejected, 2–29
David Henshaw	Navy	1843	John Tyler	Rejected, 8–34
James Madison Porter	War	1843	John Tyler	Rejected, 3–38
James S. Green	Treasury	1844	John Tyler	Rejected, vote not recorded
Thomas Ewing	War	1868	Andrew Johnson	Withdrawn
Henry Stanbery	Attorney General	1868	Andrew Johnson	Rejected, 11–29
Charles B. Warren	Attorney General	1925	Calvin Coolidge	1st time: Rejected, 39–41
Charles B. Warren	Attorney General	1925	Calvin Coolidge	2nd time: Rejected, 39–46
Lewis Strauss	Commerce	1959	Dwight D. Eisenhower	Rejected, 46–49
John Tower	Defense	1989	George H. W. Bush	Rejected, 47–53
Zoë Baird	Attorney General	1993	Bill Clinton	Withdrawn
Kimba Wood	Attorney General	1993	Bill Clinton	Withdrawn
Bobby Ray Inman	Defense	1993	Bill Clinton	Withdrawn
Anthony Lake	Central Intelligence	1996	Bill Clinton	Withdrawn
Hershel Gober	Veterans Affairs	1997	Bill Clinton	Withdrawn
Linda Chavez	Labor	2001	George W. Bush	Withdrawn
Bernard Kerik	Homeland Security	2004	George W. Bush	Withdrawn
Tom Daschle	Health and Human Services	2008	Barack Obama	Withdrawn
Bill Richardson	Commerce	2008	Barack Obama	Withdrawn
Judd Gregg	Commerce	2009	Barack Obama	Withdrawn
Andrew Puzder	Labor	2016	Donald Trump	Withdrawn
Ronny Jackson	Veterans Affairs	2018	Donald Trump	Withdrawn
Patrick M. Shanahan	Defense	2019	Donald Trump	Withdrawn
John Ratcliffe	National Intelligence	2019	Donald Trump	Withdrawn; confirmed in 2020
Chad Wolf	Homeland Security	2021	Donald Trump	Withdrawn
Neera Tanden	Office of Management and Budget	2021	Joe Biden	Withdrawn
Julie Su	Labor	2023	Joe Biden	Withdrawn
Adrianne Todman	Housing and Urban Development	2024	Joe Biden	Withdrawn
Matt Gaetz	Attorney General	2024	Donald Trump	Withdrawn
Elise Stefanik	Ambassador to the United Nations	2024	Donald Trump	Withdrawn

== See also ==
- Unsuccessful nominations to the Supreme Court of the United States
