= Rutgers v. Waddington =

New York City court case

Rutgers v. Waddington was a case held in the New York City Mayor's Court in 1784 that centered on a conflict between state law and a United States treaty. It is notable for having set precedents for judicial review and the supremacy of treaties over state laws, which would later influence the U.S. Constitution and the U.S. Supreme Court. The case is also known for the involvement of U.S. founding father Alexander Hamilton, who litigated on behalf of the defendant.

The Rutgers decision was controversial for having seemingly circumscribed the authority of the New York Legislature, which subsequently passed a vote of censure on the court.

== Background ==
After the American Revolutionary War, the New York State legislature enacted a series of laws that stripped Tories, opponents of the revolution, of their property and privilege. One such law passed by the legislature in 1783 was the Trespass Act, which gave Patriots, supporters of the revolution, the legal right to sue anyone who had occupied, damaged, or destroyed homes that they had left behind British lines during the war. That law served as the foundation for this case.

== Arguments ==
Rutgers v. Waddington was presented on June 29, 1784 before Chief Justice James Duane and four additional aldermen. The plaintiff, Elizabeth Rutgers, owned a large brewery and alehouse that she was forced to abandon during the British occupation of New York City. Under the recently enacted Trespass Act, Rutgers demanded rent by the sum of £8,000 from Joshua Waddington, who was running the brewery ever since it had been abandoned.

The defense's case was litigated by Alexander Hamilton, who posited that the Trespass Act violated the Treaty of Paris (1783) ratified by the U.S. Congress. Hamilton decided that the case would be a good test of ruling the legality of the Trespass Act.

== Decision and legacy ==
Duane handed down a split verdict, which quickly resulted in censure by the New York legislature. The ruling entitled Rutgers to rent only from the time before the British occupation, and both parties agreed to the amount of £800. Pecuniary issues aside, the case more importantly set a precedent for Congress' legal authority over the states and the limitations of judicial review. Duane wrote in his ruling that "no state in this union can alter or abridge, in a single point, the federal articles or the treaty." Additionally, according to William Treanor of Georgetown University Law Center the Rutgers case concluded, "Judges cannot 'reject' a clearly expressed statute simply because it is 'unreasonable'". Duane wrote:

The supremacy of the legislature need not be called into question; if they think fit positively to enact a law, there is no power which can control them. When the main object of such a law is clearly expressed, and the intention manifest, the judges are not at liberty, although it appears to them to be unreasonable, to reject it; for this were to set the judicial above the legislative, which would be subversive of all government.

According to historian Shannon C. Stimson, the reason for the censure was "not legislative intent, but legislative power and whether any legitimate authority existed which might challenge the majority will."

Several scholars believe that Rutgers "was a template for the interpretive approach he [Hamilton] adopted in Federalist No. 78."

=== Treaties and international law ===
In addition to articulating a concept of judicial review, the Rutgers decision is widely remembered for foreshadowing debates in the Constitutional Convention regarding the role of customary international law in domestic American law. The British defendant's primary argument was that both the "law of nations" and the Treaty of Paris justified his occupation of the disputed property, regardless of the provisions of the Trespass Act. While the court did not explicitly rule that the Treaty of Paris superseded the Trespass Act—let alone articulate a general principle that treaty law supersedes state law—its refusal to enforce the New York statute due to obligations to the "law of nations" portended the later developments of federalism such as the Supremacy Clause, in which federal statutes and treaties override state laws.

== See also ==
- Bibliography of Alexander Hamilton
