= Lucius Horatio Stockton =

American lawyer

Lucius Stockton

United States Attorney for the District of New Jersey
- In office 1798–1801
- President: John Adams
- Preceded by: Abraham Ogden
- Succeeded by: Frederick Frelinghuysen

Personal details
- Born: 1768 Princeton, New Jersey, U.S.
- Died: May 26, 1835 (aged 66–67) Trenton, New Jersey, U.S.
- Party: Federalist
- Education: Princeton University (BA)

Lucius Horatio Stockton (1765 – May 26, 1835) was an American lawyer who served as U.S. Attorney for the District of New Jersey from 1798 to 1801. His rise to this position was relatively swift: he was admitted to the New Jersey bar in 1791; he became counsellor in 1794; and in April 1797, he was appointed sergeant-at-law.

== Biography ==
Stockton was the son of Annis Boudinot Stockton and Richard Stockton, one of the signers of the Declaration of Independence. He was born at Morven, the family's estate in Princeton, New Jersey. His brother, also named Richard Stockton, would go on to be the first U.S. Attorney for the District of New Jersey and to represent the state in the U.S. Senate. In later life, he was often referred to as Horace.

Stockton graduated from the College of New Jersey (now Princeton University) in 1787. He studied law and settled in Trenton, where he established a large practice. He was appointed U.S. Attorney for the District of New Jersey in 1798, serving until 1801.

On January 13, 1801, President John Adams nominated Stockton to be Secretary of War, weeks before the end of his administration, in a move that incensed President-Elect Thomas Jefferson. On January 20, 1801, Richard Stockton, a congressman and the brother of Lucius wrote a letter to the Honorable Johnathan Dayton (a signer of the Constitution) asking Dayton to inform Adams that Lucius would not accept the nomination, and a letter to President Adams was enclosed. Stockton was known as a strongly partisan supporter of the Federalist Party. Secretary of the Treasury Oliver Wolcott Jr. at the time called him "a crazy, fanatical young man." The nomination was later withdrawn by Adams.

In 1803, Stockton wrote a series of articles in the Trenton Federalist defending himself and his late uncle Samuel W. Stockton from attacks by the True American, a Democratic-Republican organ. On July 4, 1814, Stockton delivered the main address at the New Jersey Friends of Peace Convention, organized by Federalists opposed to U.S. involvement in the War of 1812. He was also the organizer of the Washington Benevolent Society of Trenton.

He died on May 26, 1835, and was buried in Trenton.

== See also ==
- Unsuccessful nominations to the Cabinet of the United States

Legal offices
Preceded by Abraham Ogden	United States Attorney for the District of New Jersey; 1835–1850	Succeeded by Frederick Frelinghuysen
