= Richard Stockton (Continental Congressman) =

American Founding Father, jurist and legislator (1730–1781)

- Portrait attributed to John Wollaston
- Born: October 1, 1730 near Princeton, New Jersey, British America
- Died: February 28, 1781 (aged 50); Princeton, New Jersey, U.S.
- Resting place: Stony Brook Quaker Meeting House Burial Ground, Princeton
- Education: College of New Jersey (AB)
- Known for: signer of the United States Declaration of Independence

Signature
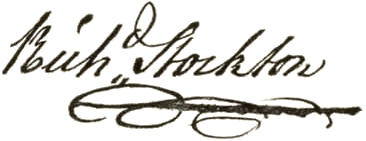

Richard Stockton (October 1, 1730 – February 28, 1781) was an American Founding Father, lawyer, jurist, and legislator. He was the first person from New Jersey to sign the Declaration of Independence.

== Early life ==
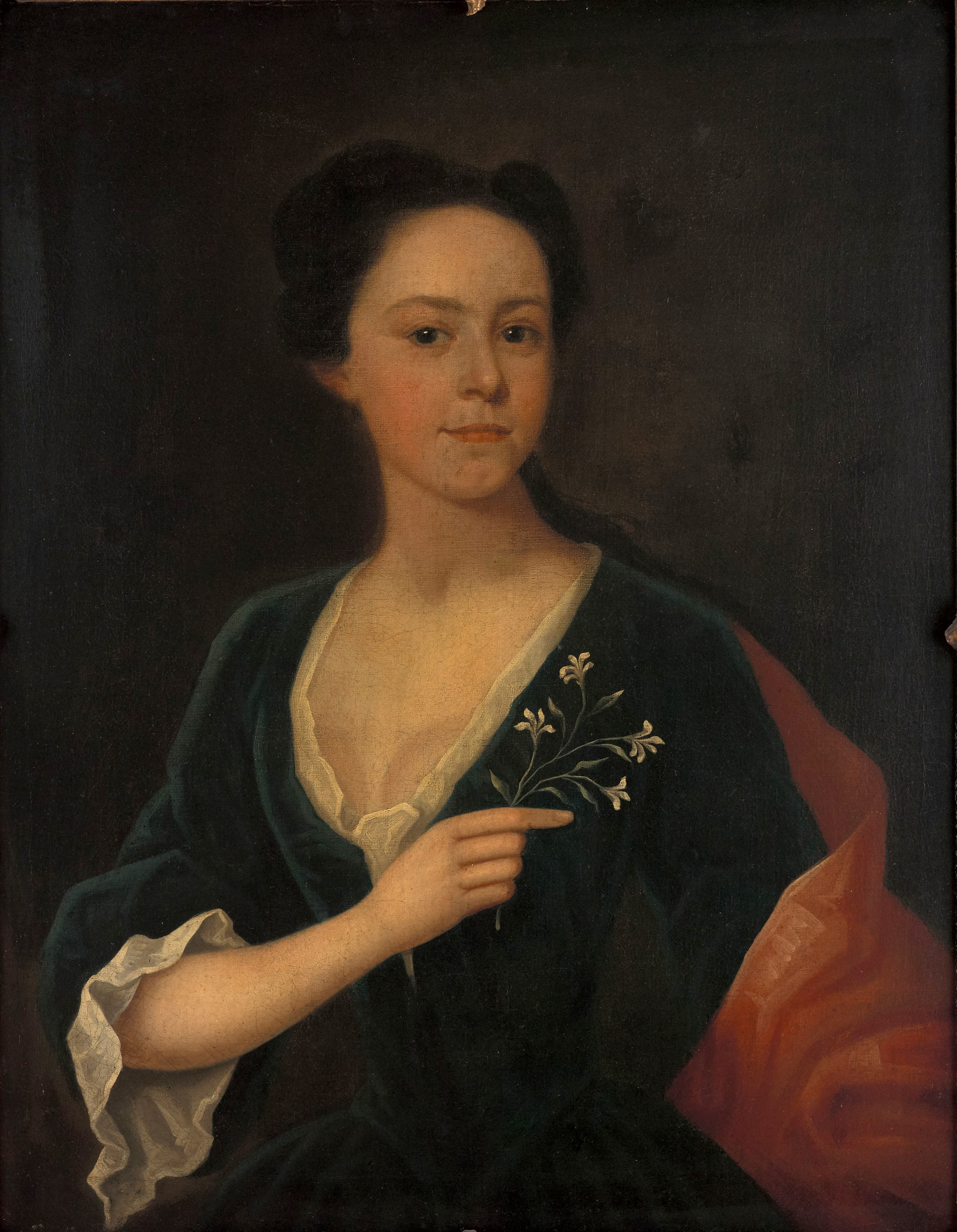
Annis Boudinot Stockton

Stockton was the son of John Stockton (1701–1758), a wealthy landowner who donated land and helped bring what is now Princeton University (then known as the College of New Jersey, located in Newark) to Princeton, New Jersey. He was born at the Stockton family home now known as Morven in the Stony Brook neighborhood of Princeton. Stockton grew up in a slaveholding family and later owned enslaved people at Morven. He attended Samuel Finley's academy at Nottingham, which later became West Nottingham Academy, and the College of New Jersey located in Newark, graduating in 1748. He studied law with David Ogden of Newark, who was at that time the head of the legal profession in the province. Stockton was admitted to the bar in 1754.

In 1763, he received the degree of serjeant-at-law, the highest degree of law at that time. He was a longtime friend of George Washington. His wife was poet Annis Boudinot Stockton, sister of New Jersey statesman Elias Boudinot. The Stocktons had six children. Their son Richard Stockton became an eminent lawyer and prominent Federalist leader. Elias Boudinot was married to Stockton's sister Hannah Stockton (1736–1808).

Stockton initially showed little interest in politics. He once wrote, "The public is generally unthankful, and I never will become a Servant of it, till I am convinced that by neglecting my own affairs I am doing more acceptable Service to God and Man." Stockton, however, took an active role as a trustee of the College of New Jersey.

== Political career ==
Stockton served the college, afterwards known as Princeton University, as a trustee for 26 years. In 1766 and 1767, he gave up his law practice for the purpose of visiting England, Scotland, and Ireland. His fame preceded him, and he was received by the most eminent men of the kingdom. Stockton had the honor of personally presenting to King George III an address of the trustees of the College of New Jersey, acknowledging the repeal of the Stamp Act, and his address was favorably received by the king. He was consulted on the state of American affairs by such notable men as the Marquess of Rockingham with whom he spent a week at his country estate. He met with Edmund Burke, the Earl of Chatham, and many other distinguished members of Parliament who were friendly to the American colonies.

In Scotland, his personal efforts resulted in the acceptance of the presidency of the college by the Reverend John Witherspoon. Witherspoon's wife had opposed her husband's taking the position, but her objections were overcome with the aid of his future son-in-law Benjamin Rush, who was a medical student in Edinburgh. That was an exceedingly important event in the history of higher education in America. One night in Edinburgh, Stockton was attacked by a robber, he defended himself skillfully with a small sword, and the surprised and wounded robber fled.

Stockton returned to America in August 1767. In 1768, Stockton had his first taste of government service when he was elevated to a seat in the New Jersey Provincial Council; in 1774 he was appointed to the provincial New Jersey Supreme Court. In 1768 he was elected to the American Philosophical Society.

He first took a moderate stance in the troubles between the American colonies and Great Britain. In 1774, he drafted and sent to Lord Dartmouth "a plan of self-government for America, independent of Parliament, without renouncing the Crown." That Commonwealth approach was not acceptable to the king. When Parliament resolved to raise revenue in the colonies in 1775, Stockton declared the colonies "must each of them send one or two of their most ingenious fellows, and enable them to get into the House of Commons, maintain them there till they can maintain themselves, or else we shall be fleeced to some purpose."

== Revolutionary War ==
In 1776, Stockton was elected to the Second Continental Congress, where he took a very active role. That August, when elections were held for the state governments of the new nation, Stockton and William Livingston each received the same number of votes to be the governor of New Jersey on the first ballot. Although Livingston later won the election by one vote, Stockton was unanimously elected to serve as the chief justice of the New Jersey Supreme Court, but he turned down that position to remain in Congress. Stockton was the first person from New Jersey to sign the Declaration of Independence.

Stockton was sent by Congress, along with fellow signer George Clymer, on an exhausting two-month journey to Fort Ticonderoga in New York to assist the Continental Army in the American Revolutionary War. On his return to Princeton, he traveled 30 miles east to the home of a friend, John Covenhoven, to evacuate his family to safety. While there, on November 30, 1776, he and Covenhoven were captured in the middle of the night, dragged from their beds by Loyalists, stripped of their property and marched to the British headquarters in Perth Amboy and turned over to the British. The day Stockton was captured, General William Howe had written a proclamation offering protection papers and a full and free pardon to those willing to remain in peaceable obedience to the king. As many took the pardon, Stockton eventually did but first was placed in irons and treated as a criminal.

He was then moved to Provost Prison in New York. After nearly five weeks, Stockton was released on parole with his health impaired. His estate, Morven, in Princeton was occupied by General Charles Cornwallis during Stockton's imprisonment. American historian William Stryker had written that "Morven[,] the home of the Hon. Richard Stockton, was denuded of its library and furniture." Stockton's treatment in the New York prisons prompted the Continental Congress to pass a resolution directing General George Washington to inquire into the circumstances; not long afterward, Stockton was paroled on January 13, 1777. The U.S. National Archives contains other messages showing that Washington duly contacted General Howe in New York regarding the exchange or release of Stockton and others.

Dr. Benjamin Rush wrote, "At Princeton I met my wife's father who had been plundered of all his household furniture and stock by the British army, and carried a prisoner to New York, from whence he was permitted to return to his family upon parole." Howe's document that Stockton signed, giving his word of honor not to meddle in the American affairs during the war, was the parole Dr. Rush said Stockton was given when he was released from prison in New York. On March 25, 1777, General Howe and his brother Lord Howe wrote to Lord George Germain, secretary of state for the Colonies, "My Lord, We have the honor to enclose to your Lordship a state of the Declarations subscribed in consequence of our Proclamation of the 30th of November. 'Although none of the Leaders, nor principal Instigators and Abettors of the Rebellion, thought fit to avail themselves of the opportunity given them to return to their Duty', we have some satisfaction in observing that so considerable a number of His Majesty's deluded Subjects, of inferior Rank, in those Provinces where the Proclamation could be expect to have Effect, were disposed to relinquish the unjust Cause they had been once induced to support."

In 1777, all members of Congress and Washington's Continental Army were required to take the oath of allegiance to the United States. Stockton, as a prisoner of war and taken behind enemy lines, was also required to take the oath. He was called before the Board, took the oath, and was dismissed. Stockton did not turn in any protection papers, as was required if one signed Howe's proclamation and was given a pardon. Because of the parole document Stockton signed with General Howe to gain his freedom that gave his word of honor not to meddle in the war, which was required to be given a parole, Stockton resigned from Congress. It took nearly two years to regain his health, according to Dr. Rush. In Princeton, a rumor was started by Mr. Cochran, a Tory, who claimed Stockton had taken General Howe's protection, which caused Stockton to be spoken against for a short time, but "Mr. Cochran's known quarrel with him makes it very doubtful to candid persons," Rev. John Witherspoon wrote in a letter to his son David. "Common report, moreover, may be attributed to Judge Stockton some of the exploits of a distant cousin, Major Richard Stockton an obnoxious Tory, who did take Howe's protection and went over to the British until he was captured in Feb. 1777." The major Richard Stockton referenced was, in fact, the first cousin of Richard "the Signer" Stockton, Major Richard Witham Stockton of Princeton, New Jersey, a commissioned officer in the British Army. Major Richard Witham Stockton remained loyal to the crown, and at the conclusion of hostilities, emigrated, along with members of his family and other United Empire Loyalists, to what would become New Brunswick, Canada.

== Death and legacy ==
Nothing was ever written about doubts of Stockton's loyalty in any of the papers of members of Congress or in any newspapers or books of the time. When his health permitted, Stockton attempted to earn a living by reopening his law practice and teaching new students. Two years after his parole from prison, he developed cancer of the lip that spread to his throat. He was never free of pain until he died on February 28, 1781, at Morven. His remains were conveyed to Nassau Hall, where a large audience of citizens, friends, and students of the college were in attendance. The eulogy was delivered by Rev. Doctor Samuel Smith, vice president of the College of New Jersey and son-in-law of Rev. John Witherspoon. Smith said, "The remains of a man who hath been long among the foremost of his country, for power, for wisdom, and for fortune; and who, if what honors this young country can bestow, if many and great personal talents, could save man from the grave, would not thus have been lamented here by you. Behold here 'the end of all perfection.' The office of a judge of the province, was never filled with more integrity and learning than it was by him, for several years before the revolution. Since that period, he hath represented New Jersey in the congress of the United States. But a declining health, and a constitution worn out with application and with service, obliged him, shortly after, to retire from the line of public duty, and hath at length dismissed him from the world."

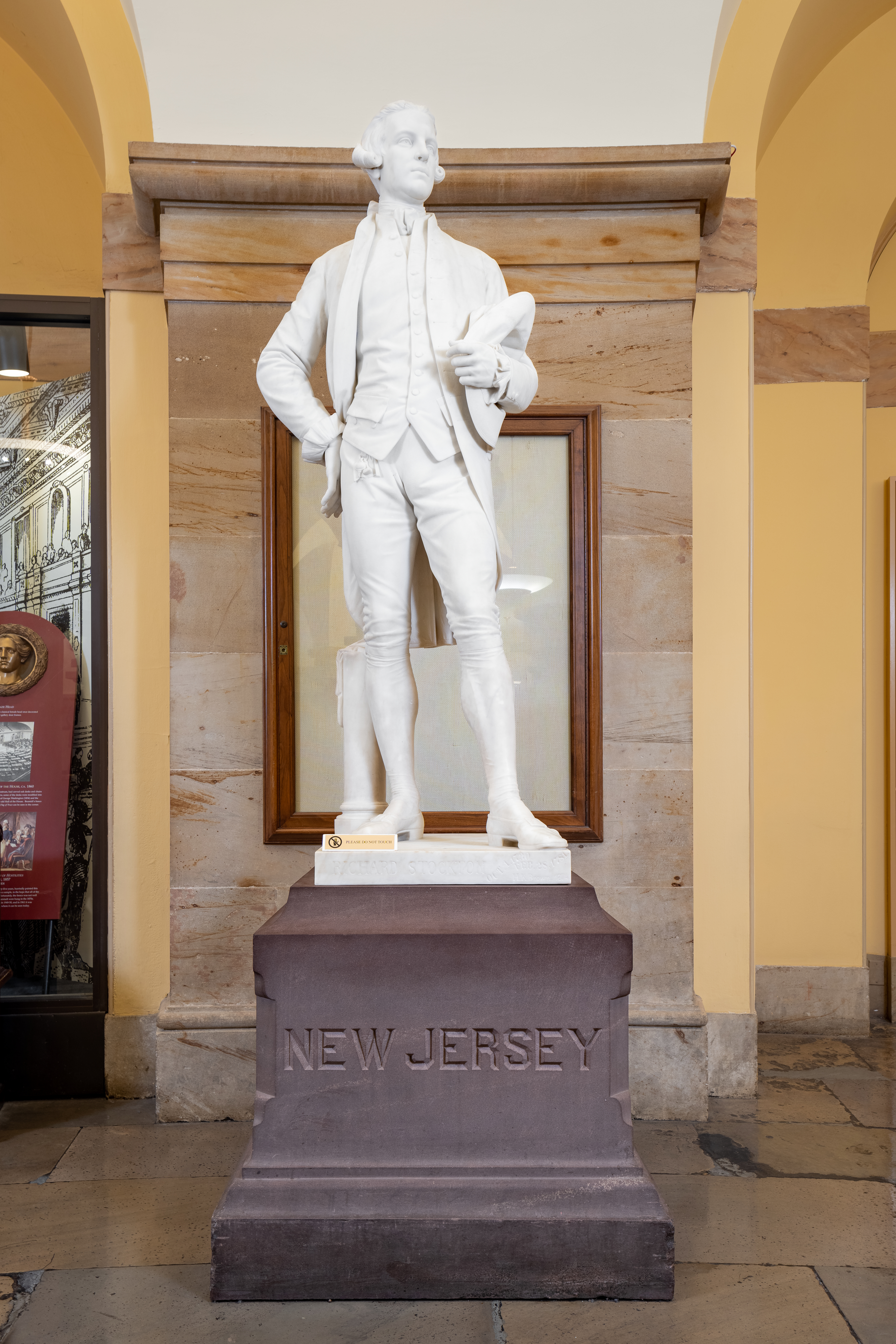
Statue of Richard Stockton, National Statuary Hall Collection

On March 7, 1781, The New Jersey Gazette acknowledged Stockton's worth to his country: "The ability, dignity, and integrity, with which this gentleman discharged the duties of the several important offices to which he was called by the voice of this country are well known." For two generations his family had been Quakers, and it was his wish to be buried at the Stony Brook Meeting House Cemetery in Princeton. Stockton and his wife Annis were close friends of General Washington. After Stockton's death, Annis, one of America's first published female poets, became a favorite correspondent of Washington. Washington and his wife Martha were frequent visitors to Morven.

In 1888, the state of New Jersey donated a marble statue of Stockton to the National Statuary Hall Collection at the United States Capitol. He is one of only six signers to be so honored. In 1969, the New Jersey Legislature passed legislation establishing a state college which was named after Stockton, to honor the memory of New Jersey's first signer of the Declaration of Independence.

Previously known as "Stockton State College", "Richard Stockton State College", and "Richard Stockton College of New Jersey", it is now known as Stockton University. A rest area on the southbound New Jersey Turnpike, south of Interstate 195, is named after Stockton.

A small town in New York south of Buffalo is named after Stockton. Stockton Street in Trenton, New Jersey is also named in his honor. Stockton Court, a building in the Independence Harbor condominium community in Edgewater, NJ, is named after Stockton. Stockton is featured among the Founding Fathers on the America 250 celebration website.

== Family ==
Stockton and his wife had six children, four daughters and two sons: Julia Stockton (married to Benjamin Rush, also a signer of the Declaration), Mary (married to Rev. Andrew Hunter and mother of General David Hunter), Susan, Richard, Lucius and Abigail. Stockton's oldest son Richard was a lawyer and U.S. Senator representing New Jersey. His grandson, Commodore Robert Field Stockton, was a hero of the War of 1812 and in 1846 became the military governor of California and a Senator from New Jersey. Stockton Rush was a descendent on his father's side of Richard Stockton.

== See also ==
- Memorial to the 56 Signers of the Declaration of Independence
