= David A. Ogden =

American politician

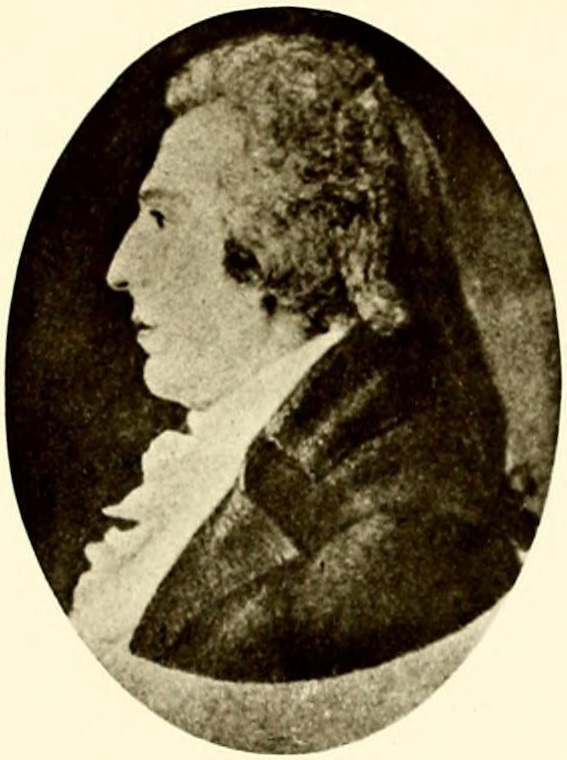

Member of the U.S. House of Representatives from New York's 18th congressional district
- In office March 4, 1817 – March 3, 1819
- Preceded by: Moss Kent
- Succeeded by: William Donnison Ford

Member of the New York State Assembly for St. Lawrence County
- In office July 1, 1814 – June 30, 1815
- Preceded by: Louis Hasbrouck
- Succeeded by: William W. Bowen

Personal details
- Born: David Aaron Ogden; January 10, 1770 Morristown, Province of New Jersey, British America
- Died: June 9, 1829 (aged 59) Montreal, Lower Canada
- Resting place: Brookside Cemetery, Waddington, New York
- Party: Federalist
- Spouse: Rebecca Cornell Edwards (m. 1797)
- Children: 11
- Parent(s): Abraham Ogden; Sarah Frances Ludlow
- Relatives: Samuel Ogden (uncle); Joshua Waddington (brother-in-law)
- Education: King's College

David Aaron Ogden (January 10, 1770 – June 9, 1829) was a U.S. representative from New York and a member of the prominent Ogden family.

== Early life ==
Born in Morristown in the Province of New Jersey, he was the son of Sarah Frances (Ludlow) and Abraham Ogden. His sister, Gertrude Gouverneur Ogden, was married to Joshua Waddington, a founder of the Bank of New York.

Ogden attended King's College (now Columbia University), New York City. He studied law and was admitted to the bar in November 1791, beginning practice in Newark, New Jersey.

== Career ==
He became counselor at law in New Jersey in 1796. He was concerned in the negotiations as to whether Aaron Burr, also from Newark and an executor of his grandfather's will, or Thomas Jefferson became president after the election of 1800, and was widely thought to have tried to get Burr become president. Alexander Hamilton was for a time a legal partner with Ogden and his brother, Thomas Ludlow Ogden (1773–1844), until Hamilton's death in 1804.

Ogden, with his brothers Thomas Ludlow Ogden and Gouverneur Ogden (1778–1851), developed through the Ogden Land Company huge tracts of northern New York state. Through their position as counsel to the Holland Land Company, David and Thomas Ogden influenced the settlement of Western New York, the construction of the Erie Canal, the determination of property law in New York, even political competition in the Republican Party. Their company succeeded in buying the majority of the Seneca Indians' reservation by the reported use of bribery and intimidation in August 1826.

=== Public office ===
He served as associate judge of the court of common pleas from 1811 to 1815. He also was a member of the New York State Assembly in 1814–15.

Ogden was elected as a Federalist to the Fifteenth Congress (March 4, 1817 – March 3, 1819). He was First Judge of the St. Lawrence County Court from 1820 to 1824 and from 1825 to 1829, and he was one of the commissioners to settle the boundary between Canada and the United States.

== Personal life ==
Ogden moved to Hamilton (now Waddington), St. Lawrence County, New York, and built a large mansion on Ogden Island. On May 30, 1797, he married Rebecca Cornell Edwards, the daughter of Isaac Edwards and Mary Cornell. They were the parents of:

- Isaac Edwards Ogden (1798–), who married Euphrosine Mericult, Letitia Hanna, and Elizabeth Chamberlain
- Sarah Ogden (1799–1844), who married Charles Russell Codman (1784–1852)
- William Ogden (1801–1838), who married Harriet Seton Ogden (1806–1884), in 1832.
- Wallace Ogden (1803–1828)
- Mary E. Ogden (1805–1853), who married Herman LeRoy Newbold (d. 1854)
- Samuel Cornell Ogden (1806–1862), who married Sarah F. Waddington (1810–1903), his first cousin, in 1843.
- Catharine H. Ogden (1808–1874), who married Samuel Ogden (1803–1879), her first cousin
- Susan W. Ogden (1810–1892), who married William Roebuck
- Rebecca E. Ogden (1811–1886), who married George B. Ogden
- Duncan Campbell Ogden (1813–1859), who married Miriam Gratz Meredith, and Elizabeth Cox, and was a member of the First Texas Legislature.
- David A. Ogden, Jr. (1815–), who married Louisa Lanfear

Ogden died in Montreal in Lower Canada (in modern-day Quebec) on June 9, 1829, and was interred in Brookside Cemetery, Waddington, New York.

=== Legacy ===
Ogdensburg, New York, a city in St. Lawrence County, New York, United States, was named for him and his uncle, Samuel Ogden.

U.S. House of Representatives
Preceded by Moss Kent	Member of the U.S. House of Representatives from New York's 18th congressional district 1817–1819	Succeeded by William Donnison Ford
