= Abraham Ogden =

American politician (1743-1798)

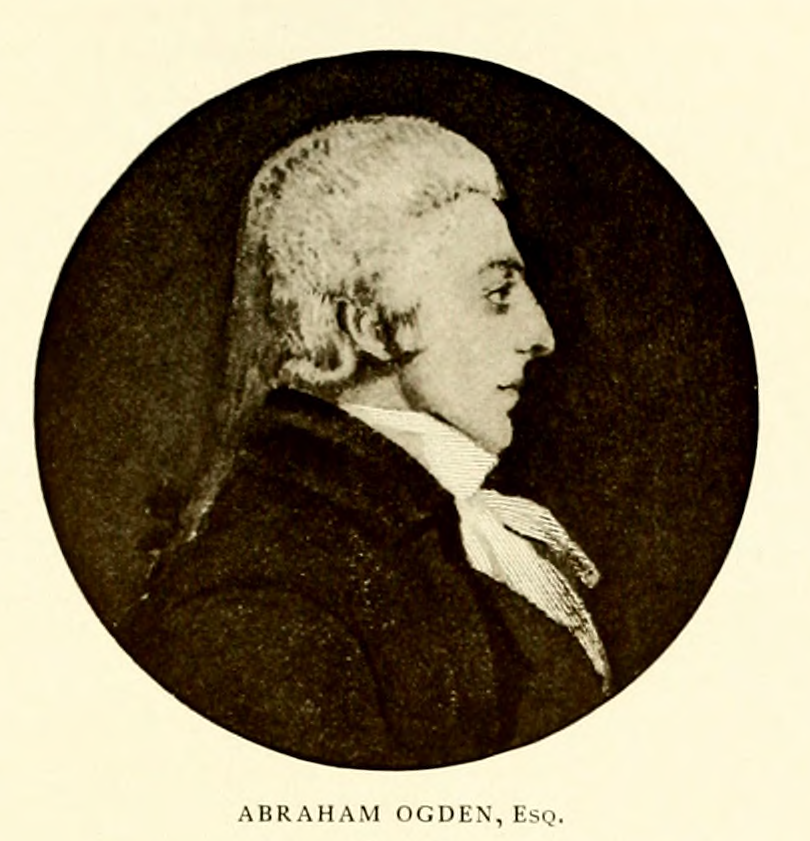

U.S. Attorney for the District of New Jersey
- In office 1791–1798
- Preceded by: Richard Stockton
- Succeeded by: Lucius Horatio Stockton

Member of the New Jersey General Assembly for Essex County
- In office 1790

Personal details
- Born: December 30, 1743 Newark, New Jersey
- Died: January 31, 1798 (aged 54) Newark, New Jersey
- Spouse: Sarah Frances Ludlow (m. 1767)
- Relations: Samuel Ogden (brother); Josiah Ogden Hoffman (nephew)
- Children: 13, including David
- Parents: David Ogden; Gertrude Gouverneur

Military service
- Allegiance: United States
- Branch/service: Continental Army
- Rank: Colonel
- Unit: New Jersey Line

Abraham Ogden (December 30, 1743 – January 31, 1798) was an American lawyer and politician who served as U.S. Attorney for the District of New Jersey from 1791 to 1798 and negotiated the Treaty of New York (1796).

== Early life ==
Ogden was born in Newark, New Jersey in 1743. He was the third son of David Ogden and Gertrude (née Gouverneur) Ogden. His father was a noted jurist and a member of the supreme court for the royal province of New Jersey before the Revolutionary War.

His sister, Sarah Ogden (1742–1821), married Nicholas Hoffman (1736–1800), and were the parents of Josiah Ogden Hoffman (1766–1837). His brother, Samuel Ogden (1746–1810), served as a Colonel of the New Jersey Militia during the Revolutionary War, and was later prominent in the iron business. Samuel married Euphemia Morris (1754–1818), a sister of Gouverneur Morris, in 1775.

== Career ==
Ogden trained as a lawyer, establishing his practice in Morristown, New Jersey. He was appointed Surrogate of Morris County in 1768.

Among those who studied law at his Morristown office were Richard Stockton (later United States Senator from New Jersey) and his nephew, Josiah Ogden Hoffman, later the New York State Attorney General.

During the Revolutionary War, Ogden and his brother Samuel sided with the Patriots, while their father David and brothers Isaac, Nicholas and Peter sided with the Loyalists.

Ogden befriended George Washington, who often visited his family residence while the Continental Army was quartered in Morristown. During that time, his young son, Thomas Ludlow Ogden, wounded Washington's hand in a fencing bout. This is believed to be the only injury that Washington suffered in the course of the war.

=== Post-Revolutionary War ===
After the war, Ogden settled in Newark. He represented Essex County in the New Jersey General Assembly in 1790. In 1791 President Washington appointed him U.S. Attorney for the District of New Jersey, a position he served until his death.

Washington also appointed Ogden as Commissioner to the Indians in Northern New York. He led the delegation that negotiated the Treaty of New York (1796) with the Seven Nations of Canada. They had been allies of the British during the Revolutionary War. Aware that the Iroquois and other tribes were being forced to cede most of their lands in New York State, which wanted to sell the property for development, Ogden, his brother Samuel, Gouverneur Morris and others purchased a large tract of land in New York, south of the Saint Lawrence River. They intended to plat and sell it to new settlers; many migrants were entering the state from New England, and some men made fortunes in land speculation. The town of Ogdensburg, New York was named after his brother, Samuel Ogden.

== Personal life ==
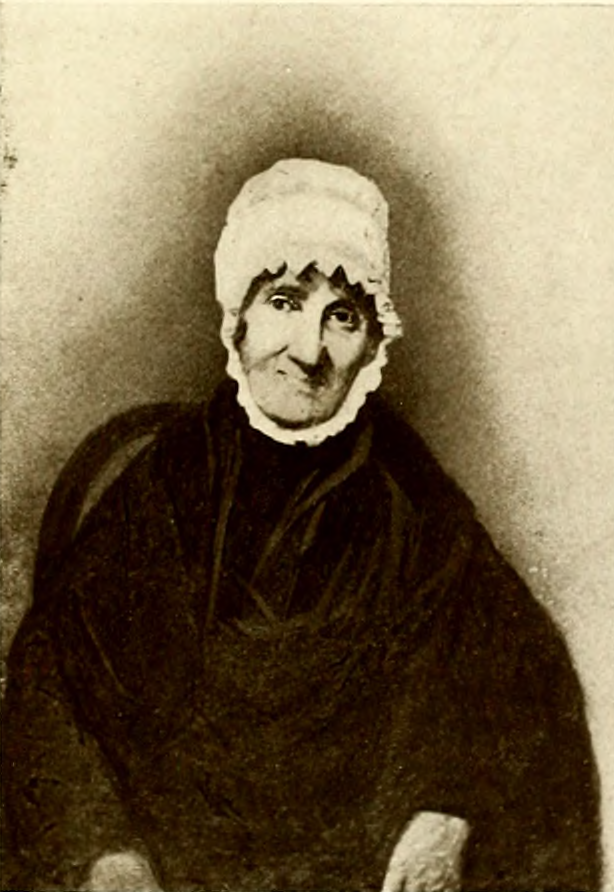
Sarah Frances Ludlow Ogden

On December 22, 1767, Ogden married Sarah F. Ludlow (1744–1823), the daughter of Catherine (née Le Roux) Ludlow and Thomas Ludlow, merchant of New York. Together, they had 13 children:

- David A. Ogden (1770–1829), U.S. Representative from New York, married Rebecca C. Edwards
- Catharine L. Ogden (1771–1814), Abijah Hammond, original landholder of Hammond, New York
- Charles L. Ogden (1772–1826), who married Elizabeth Meredith
- Thomas Ludlow Ogden (1773–1844), leading New York City lawyer, who married Martha Hammond
- Abraham Ogden (1775–1846), who married Mary L. Barnwell
- Gertrude Gouverneur Ogden (1777–1850), who married Joshua Waddington (1755–1844)
- Gouverneur Ogden (1778–1851), who married Charlotte Curzon Seton
- William Ogden (1780–1801)
- Sarah F.L. Ogden (1782–1849)
- Margaretta E. Ogden (1783–1834), who married David B. Ogden
- Isaac Ogden (1784–1867), who married Sarah Ogden Meredith
- Samuel N. Ogden (1787–1787)
- Frances S. Ogden (1788–1824), who married Nathaniel Lawrence the younger, merchant of Liverpool, England

Ogden died in 1798 in Newark.

=== Descendants ===
His grandson, William D. Waddington (1811–1886), who married Mary Elizabeth Ogden (1810–1867), were the parents of George Waddington (1840–1915), who married Elizabeth Van Rensselaer (1845–1911), the daughter of Henry Bell Van Rensselaer, a U.S. Representative and the son of New York's Lt. Gov. Stephen Van Rensselaer.

Legal offices
Preceded by Richard Stockton	United States Attorney for the District of New Jersey; 1791 – 1798	Succeeded by Lucius Horatio Stockton
