= Moss Kent =

American politician (1766–1838)

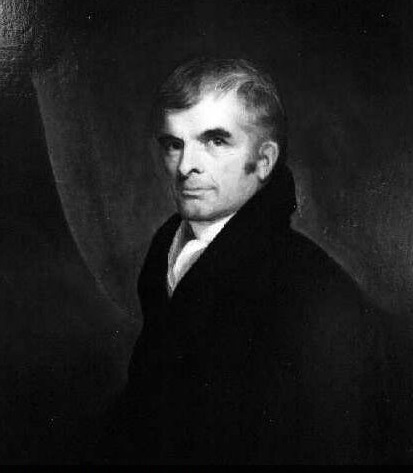

Member of the U.S. House of Representatives from New York's 18th district
- In office March 4, 1813 – March 3, 1817
- Preceded by: District created
- Succeeded by: David A. Ogden

Member of the New York State Assembly
- In office 1807, 1810

Member of the New York State Senate
- In office 1799–1803

Personal details
- Born: April 3, 1766 Croton-on-Hudson, Province of New York, British America
- Died: May 30, 1838 (aged 72) Plattsburgh, New York, U.S.
- Party: Federalist
- Parent: Moss Kent Sr. (father)
- Relatives: James Kent (brother)

Moss Kent (April 3, 1766 – May 30, 1838) was a United States representative from New York. Born in Kent's Parish, part of Croton-on-Hudson, New York, he completed preparatory studies, studied law, was admitted to the bar, and practiced there. He moved to Cooperstown, New York, and was a member of the New York State Senate from 1799 to 1803 and the New York State Assembly in 1807 and 1810. He ran twice in New York's 10th congressional district while a legislator, first in 1798 and then 1808, losing by less than 10 points in both elections.

He moved to Champion, and was appointed judge of Jefferson County on February 26, 1810. In 1812, he was elected to Congress as a Federalist. He was reelected in 1814, and served in the 13th and 14th Congresses (March 4, 1813 – March 3, 1817) as the representative of the newly created 18th district.

He pursued the daughter of friend and business associate William Cooper, Hannah Cooper. She died at age 23, and Kent never married.

After leaving Congress he resumed the practice of law, and later moved to Plattsburgh. He died in Plattsburgh on May 30, 1838, and was interred in Plattsburgh's Riverside Cemetery.

His father was Moss Kent Sr., a New York lawyer and judge. His brother was James Kent, another prominent jurist and legal scholar.

U.S. House of Representatives
New district	Member of the U.S. House of Representatives from New York's 18th congressional district 1813 – 1817	Succeeded by David A. Ogden
