= Statue of Richard Stockton =

Statue by Henry Kirke Brown

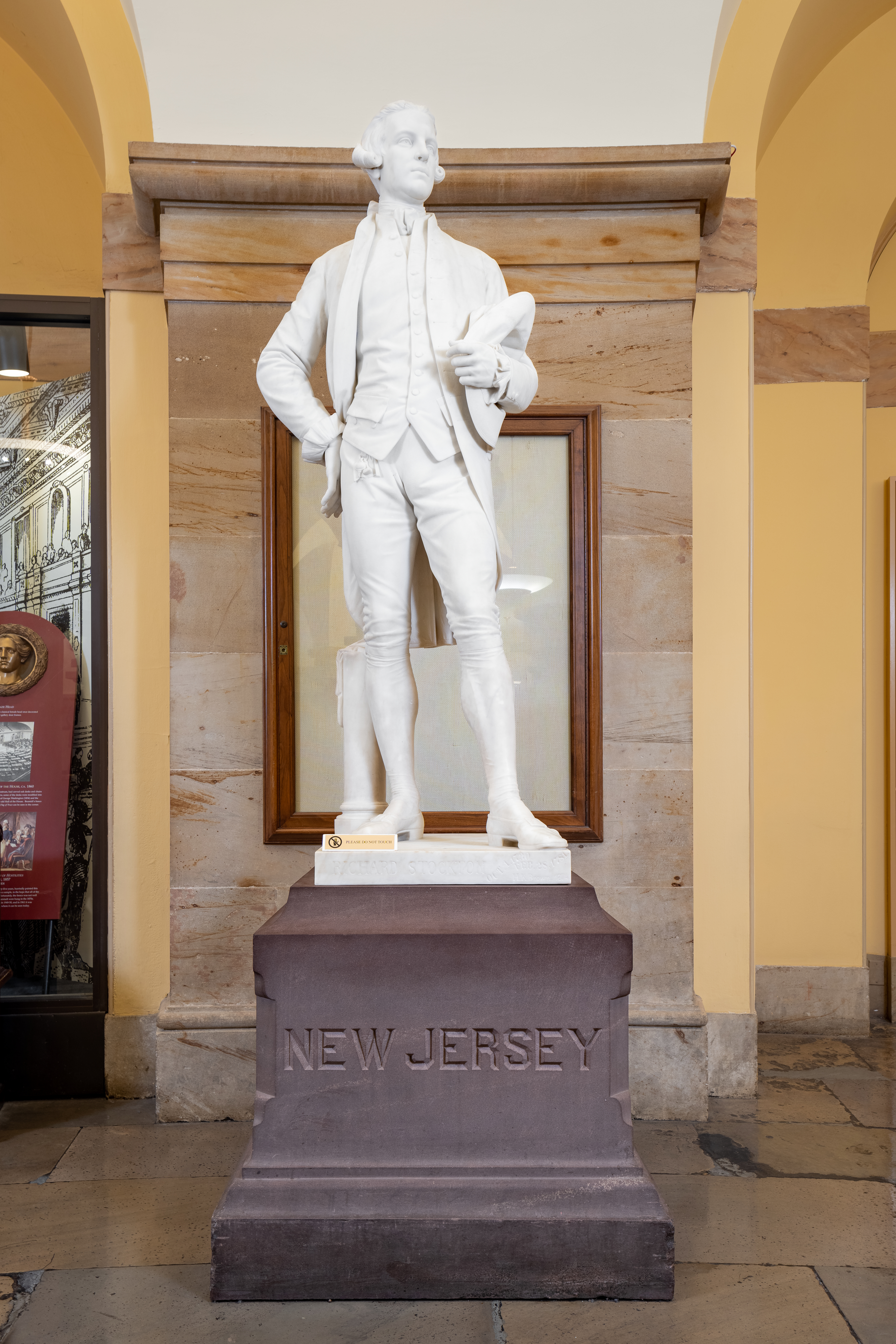
- The statue in the U.S. Capitol crypt in 2022
- Year: 1888
- Medium: Marble sculpture
- Subject: Richard Stockton
- Location: Washington, D.C., United States

Richard Stockton is a marble sculpture depicting the American lawyer, jurist, legislator of the same name by Henry Kirke Brown (completed by Henry Kirke Bush-Brown), installed in the United States Capitol's crypt, in Washington, D.C., as part of the National Statuary Hall Collection. The statue was donated by the U.S. state of New Jersey in 1888.
