= Samuel Ogden =

American businessman and land speculator (1746–1810)

- Born: December 9, 1746; Newark, Province of New Jersey, British America
- Died: December 1, 1810 (aged 63)
- Known for: Founder of Boonton Iron Works
- Spouse: Euphemia Morris (m. 1775)
- Children: 12
- Parent(s): David Ogden; Gertrude Gouverneur Ogden
- Relatives: Abraham Ogden (brother)

Colonel Samuel Ogden (December 9, 1746 — December 1, 1810) was a colonial businessman in New Jersey who had an iron works. He fought on the winning side during the American Revolutionary War. Afterward, he became a developer and land speculator for a large tract of land in upstate New York.

He worked with his brother Abraham Ogden, brother-in-law Gouverneur Morris, and others on developing this tract. The City of Ogdensburg, New York, at the confluence of the Oswegatchie with the St. Lawrence River, was named for him.

== Early life ==
Samuel Ogden was born in 1746 in Newark, New Jersey, one of five sons of David Ogden (1707—c. 1798) and Gertrude (née Gouverneur) Ogden (1716—1775). His father was a noted jurist and a member of the supreme court for the royal Province of New Jersey before the Revolutionary War. Among his siblings were Sarah (née Ogden) Hoffman (who married Nicholas Hoffman and was the mother of Josiah Ogden Hoffman); Abraham Ogden (who married Sarah Frances Ludlow); Chief Justice Isaac Ogden (father of Peter Skene Ogden); and Nicholas Ogden (who married Hannah Cuyler).

His paternal grandparents were Catherine (née Hardenbrock) Ogden and Col. Josiah Ogden, a direct descendant of John Ogden, who was known as "The Pilgrim" and was an early settler in New England who was an original patentee of the Elizabethtown Purchase, "the first English settlement in the Colony of New Jersey." His maternal grandparents were Isaac Gouverneur (brother of Speaker of the Assembly Abraham Gouverneur) and Sarah (née Staats) Gouverneur (herself a granddaughter of Abraham Staats).

== Career ==
Ogden became prominent in the iron business in New Jersey, founding the Boonton Iron Works in 1770 on six acres of land located along the Rockaway River, near Boonton. Such enterprises became critical to the American war effort. Ogden and his brother Abraham supported the Patriots during the Revolution, but their father and three other brothers were Loyalists. Ogden served as a colonel of the New Jersey Militia during the Revolutionary War.

Samuel's brother Abraham Ogden served as Commissioner to the Indians in Northern New York after the Revolutionary War, and became aware that the state was selling large portions of land that had been ceded by the Iroquois nations. The brothers purchased a large tract of land in New York with Gouverneur Morris and others, south of the Saint Lawrence River. They intended to plat, develop and sell off the land to settlers. Many land-hungry migrants were entering the state from New England. There was considerable land speculation going on in upstate New York, as some five million acres of land had been sold by the state after the Iroquois had been forced to cede most of their lands to the victorious United States. The City of Ogdensburg, New York, one of the principal settlements in this tract, was named after Samuel Ogden.

=== Adventuring in South America ===
In 1805, Samuel Ogden was working with Colonel William Stephens Smith, a prominent federal official in New York, to obtain soldiers, money, and war material for General Francisco de Miranda, a Venezuelan who was attempting to liberate South America from Spanish rule.

On February 2, 1806, Miranda sailed from New York City for Venezuela on the Leander armored by Ogden, and carrying 180 men and weapons. Among the adventurers was Colonel Smith's 19-year-old son, William Steuben Smith. The expedition failed and two ships were captured by the Spanish. Miranda escaped, but the young Smith and the other mercenaries did not. Put on trial in Puerto Cabello for piracy, ten of the mercenaries (mostly Americans) were sentenced to death by hanging. Their bodies were beheaded and quartered, with pieces sent to nearby towns as a warning. William Steuben Smith had survived; he later escaped his captors and made his way home.

When the expedition was publicized by the Spanish ambassador in Washington, Smith and Ogden were arrested in New York for violating the federal Neutrality Act of 1794. That law made it illegal to "set on foot directly or indirectly within the United States any military expedition or enterprise to be carried on against the territory of a foreign state with whom the United States is at peace."

On March 1, 1806, Judge Matthias Talmadge of the U.S. District Court in New York questioned Smith and Ogden. They signed incriminating statements outlining their roles in the affair. Smith and Ogden were formally indicted on April 7. If convicted, they each faced up to three years in prison. In the meantime, President Thomas Jefferson dismissed Smith from his post. Colonel Smith claimed in court that his orders came from President Thomas Jefferson and U.S. Secretary of State James Madison, both of whom refused to appear in court. Judge William Paterson of the US Supreme Court ruled that the President "cannot authorize a person to do what the law forbids." Both Smith and Ogden stood trial and were each acquitted.

On November 24, 1807, Col. Ogden moved to quash the indictment of Aaron Burr for the murder of General Alexander Hamilton after the Burr–Hamilton duel.

== Personal life ==
On February 5, 1775, after having established himself in business, Ogden was married to Euphemia Morris (1754—1818) by Rev. Samuel Seabury. Euphemia was a daughter of Lewis Morris Jr., a wealthy landowner and judge, and his second wife, Sarah (née Gouverneur) Morris. She was a sister of Gouverneur Morris (a U.S. Senator and U.S. Minister to France), and among her half-siblings was Lewis Morris, a signer of the Declaration of Independence, and Staats Long Morris, a loyalist and major-general in the British army. Together, they were the parents of:

1. David Bayard Ogden (1775—1849), who married his first cousin, Margaretta E. Ogden (1783–1834) (daughter of Abraham Ogden).
2. Gertrude Gouverneur Ogden (1777—1828), who married William Meredith (1777—1844), brother of Jonathan Meredith. Their daughter, Sarah Ogden Meredith, was married to Isaac Ogden (son of Abraham Ogden).
3. Sarah Morris Ogden (1779—1832), who died unmarried onboard Nashville from New Orleans to New York City.
4. Catharine Morris Ogden (1781—1863), who married James Parker, a 1793 Columbia College graduate who became a U.S. Representative.
5. Euphemia Ogden (b. 1782)
6. Lewis Morris Ogden (1783—1810)
7. Morris M. Ogden
8. Isabella W. Ogden (1787—1820)
9. Caroline Knox Ogden (1789—1790), who died young.
10. Caroline Knox Ogden II (1791—1844), who married Isaac A. Johnson.
11. Gouverneur Morris Ogden (1792—1793), who died young.
12. Samuel Gouverneur Morris Ogden (1794—1797), who died young.

Col. Ogden was a very prominent Episcopal churchman and was a delegate to all the conventions from 1791 to 1809.

Ogden died on December 1, 1810. After his widows death in 1818, a tablet inscribed to her memory is in Grace Church in New York City at Broadway and 10th street which reads "Euphemia Ogden Relict of Samuel Ogden Esq. of Newark, N.J. Born Sept. 10, 1754, Died June 2, 1818" along with "Isabella W. Ogden, her daughter Born Feb. 17, 1787, Died 15th April, 1820."
