= Federalist No. 78 =

Most-cited Federalist Paper; by Alexander Hamilton and about the Supreme Court

- Alexander Hamilton, author of Federalist No. 78
- Author: Alexander Hamilton
- Original title: The Judiciary Department
- Language: English
- Publisher: J. & A. McLean; The Independent Journal, New York Packet, The Daily Advertiser
- Publication date: May 28, 1788; June 14, 1788
- Publication place: United States
- Media type: Book, Newspaper
- Preceded by: Federalist No. 77
- Followed by: Federalist No. 79

Federalist No. 78 is an essay by Alexander Hamilton, the seventy-eighth of The Federalist Papers. Like all of The Federalist papers, it was published under the pseudonym Publius.

Titled "The Judiciary Department", Federalist No. 78 was published May 28, 1788, and first appeared in a newspaper on June 14 of the same year. It was written to explicate and justify the structure of the judiciary under the proposed Constitution of the United States; it is the first of six essays by Hamilton on this issue. In particular, it addresses concerns by the Anti-Federalists over the scope and power of the federal judiciary, which would have comprised unelected, politically insulated judges that would be appointed for life.

The Federalist Papers, as a foundation text of constitutional interpretation, are frequently cited by U.S. jurists, but are not law. Of all the essays, No. 78 is the most cited by the justices of the United States Supreme Court.

Federalist No. 78 quotes Montesquieu: "Of the three powers [...], the judiciary is next to nothing." There was little concern that the judiciary might be able to overpower the political branches; since Congress controlled the flow of money and the President the military, courts did not have nearly the same power from a constitutional design standpoint. The Judiciary would depend on the political branches to uphold its judgments. Legal academics often argue over Hamilton's description of the judiciary as the "least dangerous" branch. Hamilton also explains how federal judges should retain life terms as long as those judges exhibit good behavior.

Federalist No. 78 discusses the power of judicial review. It argues that the federal courts have the job of determining whether acts of Congress are constitutional and what must be done if the government is faced with the things that are done on the contrary of the Constitution.

== Controls on judicial conduct ==
The fundamental debate that Hamilton and his Anti-Federalist rival "Brutus" addressed was over the degree of independence to be granted to federal judges, and the level of accountability to be imposed upon them. In England, a judge can be removed from office "upon the address of both Houses of Parliament." Moreover, as the Act of Settlement 1701 was a mere law, the judicial independence it provided could be abrogated wholesale by an act of Parliament. Similarly, English judges were beholden to Parliament, in the sense that their judgments can be overturned by that body. Brutus took the position that the Constitution should adopt the English system in toto (with minor modifications); Hamilton defended the present system.

Several scholars believe that the case of Rutgers v. Waddington "was a template for the interpretive approach he [Hamilton] adopted in Federalist 78."

=== Good behavior tenure ===
In England, although most agents of the Crown served "at the pleasure of the King," public officials were often granted a life tenure in their offices. Lesser lords were given the authority to bestow life tenure, which created an effective multi-tiered political patronage system where everyone from paymasters to judges to parish clerks enjoyed job security. Without some kind of effective control upon their conduct, this would engender intolerable injustice, as the King's ministers would be free to 'vent their spleen' upon defenseless subjects with impunity.

The English solution to this problem was to condition the holding of office upon good behavior, as enforced by the people through the writ of scire facias. Although it was technically a writ of the sovereign, this power concerned only the interests of his subjects; as the King exercised it only as parens patriae, he was bound by law to allow the use of it to any subject interested. Sir William Blackstone explains in his landmark treatise on the common law, Commentaries on the Laws of England:

WHERE the crown hath unadvisedly granted any thing by letters patent, which ought not to be granted, or where the patentee hath done an act that amounts to a forfeiture of the grant, the remedy to repeal the patent is by writ of scire facias in chancery. This may be brought either on the part of the king, in order to resume the thing granted; or, if the grant be injurious to a subject, the king is bound of right to permit him (upon his petition) to use his royal name for repealing the patent in a scire facias.

Violations of good behavior tenure at common law included "abuse of office, nonuse of office, and refusal to exercise an office," and the "oppression and tyrannical partiality of judges, justices, and other magistrates, in the administration and under the colour of their office, [which could be prosecuted] by information in the court of king's bench." As the remedy of the writ of scire facias was available in every one of the colonies, its efficacy as a deterrent against abuse of judicial office was assumed rather than debated.

=== Legislative review of judicial decisions ===
The primary point of contention between Hamilton and Brutus was in the concern that judges would substitute their will for the plain text of the Constitution, as exemplified by the Supreme Court's de facto revision of the Eleventh Amendment. Hamilton conceded that no federal judge had the legal authority to impose his or her will on the people in defiance of the Constitution:

There is no position that depends on clearer principles, than that every act of a delegated authority, contrary to the tenor of the commission under which it is exercised, is void. No legislative act, therefore, contrary to the Constitution, can be valid. To deny this, would be to affirm, that the deputy is greater than his principal; that the servant is above his master; that the representatives of the people are superior to the people themselves; that men acting by virtue of powers, may do not only what their powers do not authorize, but what they forbid. ... To avoid arbitrary discretion in the courts, it is indispensable that they should be bound down by strict rules and precedents, which serve to define and point out their duty in every particular case that comes before them.

Brutus pointed out that the Constitution did not provide an effective mechanism for controlling judicial caprice:

There is no power above them, to control any of their decisions. There is no authority that can remove them, and they cannot be controlled by the laws of the legislature. In short, they are independent of the people, of the legislature, and of every power under heaven. Men placed in this situation will generally soon feel independent of heaven itself.

Hamilton viewed this apparent flaw in constitutional design as more of a virtue than a vice:

But it is not with a view to infractions of the Constitution only, that the independence of the judges may be an essential safeguard against the effects of occasional ill senses of humor in the society. These sometimes extend no farther than to the injury of the private rights of particular classes of citizens, by unjust and partial laws. Here also the firmness of the judicial magistracy is of vast importance in mitigating the severity and confining the operation of such laws. It not only serves to moderate the immediate mischiefs of those which may have been passed, but it operates as a check upon the legislative body in passing them; who, perceiving that obstacles to the success of iniquitous intention are to be expected from the scruples of the courts, are in a manner compelled, by the very motives of the injustice they meditate, to qualify their attempts. This is a circumstance calculated to have more influence upon the character of our governments, than but few may be aware of.

It appears that Hamilton is relying on the efficacy of the writ of scire facias, coupled with a presumption that other branches of government will ignore unconstitutional judicial decisions, as a control upon judicial misconduct.

== Judicial review ==
Federalist No. 78 describes the process of judicial review, in which the federal courts review statutes to determine whether they are consistent with the Constitution and its statutes. Federalist No. 78 indicates that under the Constitution, the legislature is not the judge of the constitutionality of its own actions. Rather, it is the responsibility of the federal courts to protect the people by restraining the legislature from acting inconsistently with the Constitution:

If it is said that the legislative body is themselves the constitutional judges of their own powers and that the construction, they put upon them is conclusive upon the other departments, it may be answered, that this cannot be the natural presumption, where it is not to be collected from any particular provisions in the Constitution. It is not otherwise to be supposed, that the Constitution could intend to enable the representatives of the people to substitute their will to that of their constituents. It is far more rational to suppose that the courts were designed to be an intermediate body between the people and the legislature, in order, among other things, to keep the latter within the limits assigned to their authority.

Federalist No. 78 views the judicial branch as inherently weak because of its inability to control either the money or the military of the country. The only power of the judicial branch is the power of judgment:

The Executive not only dispenses the honors but holds the sword of the community. The legislature not only commands the purse but prescribes the rules by which the duties and rights of every citizen are to be regulated. The judiciary, on the contrary, has no influence over either the sword or the purse; no direction either of the strength or of the wealth of the society; and can take no active resolution whatever. It may truly be said to have neither FORCE nor WILL, but merely judgment; and must ultimately depend upon the aid of the executive arm even for the efficacy of its judgments.

Because of the courts' weakness, Federalist No. 78 sees the possibility of corruption using the judicial review as a non-issue. The people will never be in danger if the structure of the government written up in the Constitution remains. It also asserts that judgment needs to be removed from the groups that make the legislation and rule:

It equally proves, that though individual oppression may now and then proceed from the courts of justice, the general liberty of the people can never be endangered from that quarter; I mean so long as the judiciary remains truly distinct from both the legislature and the Executive. For I agree, that "there is no liberty if the power of judging is not separated from the legislative and executive powers.

Federalist No. 78 views Supreme Court Justices as an embodiment of the Constitution, the last group to protect the foundation laws set up in the Constitution. This coincides with the view above that the judicial branch is the branch of judgment:

The interpretation of the laws is the proper and peculiar province of the courts. A constitution is, in fact, and must be regarded by the judges, as a fundamental law. It, therefore, belongs to them to ascertain its meaning, as well as the meaning of any particular act proceeding from the legislative body.

According to Federalist No. 78, the federal courts have a duty to interpret and apply the Constitution, and to disregard any statute that is inconsistent with the Constitution:

If there should happen to be an irreconcilable variance between the two, that which has the superior obligation and validity ought, of course, to be preferred; or, in other words, the Constitution ought to be preferred to the statute, the intention of the people to the intention of their agents. . . .

Federalist No. 78 argues that the power of judicial review should be used by the judicial branch to protect the liberties guaranteed to the people by the Constitution and to provide a check on the power of the legislature:

[W]here the will of the legislature, declared in its statutes, stands in opposition to that of the people, declared in the Constitution, the judges ought to be governed by the latter rather than the former. They ought to regulate their decisions by the fundamental laws, rather than by those which are not fundamental. . . [W]henever a particular statute contravenes the Constitution; it will be the duty of the judicial tribunals to adhere to the latter and disregard the former.

Federalist No. 78, therefore, indicates that the federal judiciary has the power to determine whether statutes are constitutional and to find them invalid if in conflict with the Constitution. This principle of judicial review was affirmed by the Supreme Court in the case of Marbury v. Madison (1803).
