= Samuel Ferrand Waddington =

English merchant and political activist

Samuel Ferrand Washington (born 1759, fl. 1790 – 1812) was an English merchant and a political activist.

== Life ==
He was born in 1759 in a village called Walkeringham in the Nottinghamshire county of England. He was educated at a German university and went into commerce. He engaged in the hop trade and lived near Tonbridge, Kent.

During at least the later part of the American Revolution, he was living in New York city and joined a Loyalist Militia Regiment, the "Battalion of the Loyal Volunteers of New York. (May 1782)

After the American Revolution, he lived in Halifax, Nova Scotia. (Oct. 1784 - Nov. 1795)

At the outbreak of the French Revolution, he took up the cause of the Republicans. In 1795, he chaired several meetings in London aimed at petitioning the crown and parliament to make peace with France. Because of his views, he was expelled from the Surrey Troop of light horses. In 1806, he attacked Edmund Burke in a pamphlet entitled Remarks on Mr. Burke's Two Letters "on the Proposals for Peace with the Regicide Directory of France," censuring him for applying the term 'regicide' to the French Directory.

In 1800, he was brought to trial for forestalling hops, having purchased a large number of hop-grounds to control the price of their production. He was found guilty, fined £500, and sentenced to one month's imprisonment. He continued to live in Kent, and in the borough of Southwark until 1812. The date of his death is uncertain.

== Works ==
- Remarks on Mr. Burke's Two Letters "on the Proposals for Peace with the Regicide Directory of France," London, 1806
- The Metaphysic of Man, a translation from the German of J. C. Goldbeck, London, 1806
- Letter to Thomas Erskine on the Subject of Forestalling Hops, London, 1799
- An Appeal to British Hop Planters, London, 1805
- The Critical Moment, London, 1805
- Three Letters to that Greatest of Political Apostates George Tierney, London, 1806
- A Letter to the Lord Mayor on Matters of the highest Importance to a Free People, London, 1810
- The Oriental Exposition, presenting to the United Kingdom an open Trade to India and China, London, 1811
- A Key to a Delicate Investigation, London, 1812, published as "Esculapius".
- An Address to the People of the United Kingdom, London, 1812, published as Algernon Sydney.
