= Treaty of New York (1796) =

The Treaty of New York (1796) was a treaty signed on May 31, 1796, after negotiations in the City of New York between the United States and the Seven Nations of Canada. Under it, the Native Americans in question gave up, for compensation, all claim to land in New York State. There were three signed copies: for New York State, the United States, and the indigenous peoples. The United States copy was lost in the fire of 1800 that destroyed the records of the Department of War (the National Archives did not exist until 1934), codified in 1845 in Volume 7 of the United States Statutes at Large as 7 Stat. 55, land cession area enumerated as "28" by Charles C. Royce ("Royce Area 28") in 1899, then placed in a compendium published by the Government Printing Office in a 1904 volume of Indian treaties. In the New York State Archives are receipts from the Seven Nations for money paid under the treaty.
