= New Jersey's congressional delegations =

These are tables of congressional delegations from New Jersey to the United States Senate and United States House of Representatives.

The current dean of the New Jersey delegation is Representative Chris Smith (NJ-4), having served in the House since 1981.

== United States Senate ==
Current U.S. senators from New Jersey
| New Jersey CPVI (2025): D+4 | Class I senator | Class II senator |
|---|---|---|
| New Jersey CPVI (2025): D+4 | Andy Kim (Junior senator) (Moorestown) | Cory Booker (Senior senator) (Newark) |
| Party | Democratic | Democratic |
| Incumbent since | December 8, 2024 | October 31, 2013 |

| Class I senator | Congress | Class II senator |
|---|---|---|
| Jonathan Elmer (PA) | 1st (1789–1791) | William Paterson (PA) |
| Jonathan Elmer (PA) | 1st (1789–1791) | Philemon Dickinson (PA) |
| John Rutherfurd (PA) | 2nd (1791–1793) | Philemon Dickinson (PA) |
| John Rutherfurd (PA) | 3rd (1793–1795) | Frederick Frelinghuysen (PA) |
| John Rutherfurd (F) | 4th (1795–1797) | Frederick Frelinghuysen (F) |
| John Rutherfurd (F) | 4th (1795–1797) | Richard Stockton (F) |
| John Rutherfurd (F) | 5th (1797–1799) | Richard Stockton (F) |
| Franklin Davenport (F) | 5th (1797–1799) | Richard Stockton (F) |
| James Schureman (F) | 6th (1799–1801) | Jonathan Dayton (F) |
| Aaron Ogden (F) | 6th (1799–1801) | Jonathan Dayton (F) |
| Aaron Ogden (F) | 7th (1801–1803) | Jonathan Dayton (F) |
| John Condit (DR) | 8th (1803–1805) | Jonathan Dayton (F) |
| John Condit (DR) | 9th (1805–1807) | Aaron Kitchell (DR) |
| John Condit (DR) | 10th (1807–1809) | Aaron Kitchell (DR) |
| John Lambert (DR) | 11th (1809–1811) | Aaron Kitchell (DR) |
| John Lambert (DR) | 11th (1809–1811) | John Condit (DR) |
| John Lambert (DR) | 12th (1811–1813) | John Condit (DR) |
| John Lambert (DR) | 13th (1813–1815) | John Condit (DR) |
| James J. Wilson (DR) | 14th (1815–1817) | John Condit (DR) |
| James J. Wilson (DR) | 15th (1817–1819) | Mahlon Dickerson (DR) |
| James J. Wilson (DR) | 16th (1819–1821) | Mahlon Dickerson (DR) |
| Samuel L. Southard (DR) | 16th (1819–1821) | Mahlon Dickerson (DR) |
| Samuel L. Southard (DR) | 17th (1821–1823) | Mahlon Dickerson (DR) |
| Joseph McIlvaine (DR) | 18th (1823–1825) | Mahlon Dickerson (DR) |
| Joseph McIlvaine (NR) | 19th (1825–1827) | Mahlon Dickerson (J) |
| Ephraim Bateman (NR) | 19th (1825–1827) | Mahlon Dickerson (J) |
| Ephraim Bateman (NR) | 20th (1827–1829) | Mahlon Dickerson (J) |
| Mahlon Dickerson (J) | 21st (1829–1831) | Theodore Frelinghuysen (NR) |
| Mahlon Dickerson (J) | 22nd (1831–1833) | Theodore Frelinghuysen (NR) |
| Samuel L. Southard (NR) | 23rd (1833–1835) | Theodore Frelinghuysen (NR) |
| Samuel L. Southard (NR) | 24th (1835–1837) | Garret D. Wall (J) |
| Samuel L. Southard (W) | 25th (1837–1839) | Garret D. Wall (D) |
| Samuel L. Southard (W) | 26th (1839–1841) | Garret D. Wall (D) |
| Samuel L. Southard (W) | 27th (1841–1843) | Jacob W. Miller (W) |
| William L. Dayton (W) | 27th (1841–1843) | Jacob W. Miller (W) |
| William L. Dayton (W) | 28th (1843–1845) | Jacob W. Miller (W) |
| William L. Dayton (W) | 29th (1845–1847) | Jacob W. Miller (W) |
| William L. Dayton (W) | 30th (1847–1849) | Jacob W. Miller (W) |
| William L. Dayton (W) | 31st (1849–1851) | Jacob W. Miller (W) |
| Robert F. Stockton (D) | 32nd (1851–1853) | Jacob W. Miller (W) |
| John Renshaw Thomson (D) | 33rd (1853–1855) | William Wright (D) |
| John Renshaw Thomson (D) | 34th (1855–1857) | William Wright (D) |
| John Renshaw Thomson (D) | 35th (1857–1859) | William Wright (D) |
| John Renshaw Thomson (D) | 36th (1859–1861) | John C. Ten Eyck (R) |
| John Renshaw Thomson (D) | 37th (1861–1863) | John C. Ten Eyck (R) |
| Richard Stockton Field (R) | 37th (1861–1863) | John C. Ten Eyck (R) |
| James Walter Wall (D) | 37th (1861–1863) | John C. Ten Eyck (R) |
| William Wright (D) | 38th (1863–1865) | John C. Ten Eyck (R) |
| William Wright (D) | 39th (1865–1867) | John P. Stockton (D) |
| Frederick T. Frelinghuysen (R) | 39th (1865–1867) | Alexander G. Cattell (R) |
| Frederick T. Frelinghuysen (R) | 40th (1867–1869) | Alexander G. Cattell (R) |
| John P. Stockton (D) | 41st (1869–1871) | Alexander G. Cattell (R) |
| John P. Stockton (D) | 42nd (1871–1873) | Frederick T. Frelinghuysen (R) |
| John P. Stockton (D) | 43rd (1873–1875) | Frederick T. Frelinghuysen (R) |
| Theodore F. Randolph (D) | 44th (1875–1877) | Frederick T. Frelinghuysen (R) |
| Theodore F. Randolph (D) | 45th (1877–1879) | John R. McPherson (D) |
| Theodore F. Randolph (D) | 46th (1879–1881) | John R. McPherson (D) |
| William J. Sewell (R) | 47th (1881–1883) | John R. McPherson (D) |
| William J. Sewell (R) | 48th (1883–1885) | John R. McPherson (D) |
| William J. Sewell (R) | 49th (1885–1887) | John R. McPherson (D) |
| Rufus Blodgett (D) | 50th (1887–1889) | John R. McPherson (D) |
| Rufus Blodgett (D) | 51st (1889–1891) | John R. McPherson (D) |
| Rufus Blodgett (D) | 52nd (1891–1893) | John R. McPherson (D) |
| James Smith Jr. (D) | 53rd (1893–1895) | John R. McPherson (D) |
| James Smith Jr. (D) | 54th (1895–1897) | William J. Sewell (R) |
| James Smith Jr. (D) | 55th (1897–1899) | William J. Sewell (R) |
| John Kean (R) | 56th (1899–1901) | William J. Sewell (R) |
| John Kean (R) | 57th (1901–1903) | John F. Dryden (R) |
| John Kean (R) | 58th (1903–1905) | John F. Dryden (R) |
| John Kean (R) | 59th (1905–1907) | John F. Dryden (R) |
| John Kean (R) | 60th (1907–1909) | Frank O. Briggs (R) |
| John Kean (R) | 61st (1909–1911) | Frank O. Briggs (R) |
| James E. Martine (D) | 62nd (1911–1913) | Frank O. Briggs (R) |
| James E. Martine (D) | 63rd (1913–1915) | William Hughes (D) |
| James E. Martine (D) | 64th (1915–1917) | William Hughes (D) |
| Joseph S. Frelinghuysen Sr. (R) | 65th (1917–1919) | William Hughes (D) |
| Joseph S. Frelinghuysen Sr. (R) | 65th (1917–1919) | David Baird Sr. (R) |
| Joseph S. Frelinghuysen Sr. (R) | 66th (1919–1921) | Walter E. Edge (R) |
| Joseph S. Frelinghuysen Sr. (R) | 67th (1921–1923) | Walter E. Edge (R) |
| Edward I. Edwards (D) | 68th (1923–1925) | Walter E. Edge (R) |
| Edward I. Edwards (D) | 69th (1925–1927) | Walter E. Edge (R) |
| Edward I. Edwards (D) | 70th (1927–1929) | Walter E. Edge (R) |
| Hamilton F. Kean (R) | 71st (1929–1931) | Walter E. Edge (R) |
| Hamilton F. Kean (R) | 71st (1929–1931) | David Baird Jr. (R) |
| Hamilton F. Kean (R) | 71st (1929–1931) | Dwight Morrow (R) |
| Hamilton F. Kean (R) | 72nd (1931–1933) | Dwight Morrow (R) |
| Hamilton F. Kean (R) | 72nd (1931–1933) | W. Warren Barbour (R) |
| Hamilton F. Kean (R) | 73rd (1933–1935) | W. Warren Barbour (R) |
| A. Harry Moore (D) | 74th (1935–1937) | W. Warren Barbour (R) |
| A. Harry Moore (D) | 75th (1937–1939) | William H. Smathers (D) |
| John Milton (D) | 75th (1937–1939) | William H. Smathers (D) |
| W. Warren Barbour (R) | 75th (1937–1939) | William H. Smathers (D) |
| W. Warren Barbour (R) | 76th (1939–1941) | William H. Smathers (D) |
| W. Warren Barbour (R) | 77th (1941–1943) | William H. Smathers (D) |
| W. Warren Barbour (R) | 78th (1943–1945) | Albert W. Hawkes (R) |
| Arthur Walsh (D) | 78th (1943–1945) | Albert W. Hawkes (R) |
| H. Alexander Smith (R) | 78th (1943–1945) | Albert W. Hawkes (R) |
| H. Alexander Smith (R) | 79th (1945–1947) | Albert W. Hawkes (R) |
| H. Alexander Smith (R) | 80th (1947–1949) | Albert W. Hawkes (R) |
| H. Alexander Smith (R) | 81st (1949–1951) | Robert C. Hendrickson (R) |
| H. Alexander Smith (R) | 82nd (1951–1953) | Robert C. Hendrickson (R) |
| H. Alexander Smith (R) | 83rd (1953–1955) | Robert C. Hendrickson (R) |
| H. Alexander Smith (R) | 84th (1955–1957) | Clifford P. Case (R) |
| H. Alexander Smith (R) | 85th (1957–1959) | Clifford P. Case (R) |
| Harrison A. Williams (D) | 86th (1959–1961) | Clifford P. Case (R) |
| Harrison A. Williams (D) | 87th (1961–1963) | Clifford P. Case (R) |
| Harrison A. Williams (D) | 88th (1963–1965) | Clifford P. Case (R) |
| Harrison A. Williams (D) | 89th (1965–1967) | Clifford P. Case (R) |
| Harrison A. Williams (D) | 90th (1967–1969) | Clifford P. Case (R) |
| Harrison A. Williams (D) | 91st (1969–1971) | Clifford P. Case (R) |
| Harrison A. Williams (D) | 92nd (1971–1973) | Clifford P. Case (R) |
| Harrison A. Williams (D) | 93rd (1973–1975) | Clifford P. Case (R) |
| Harrison A. Williams (D) | 94th (1975–1977) | Clifford P. Case (R) |
| Harrison A. Williams (D) | 95th (1977–1979) | Clifford P. Case (R) |
| Harrison A. Williams (D) | 96th (1979–1981) | Bill Bradley (D) |
| Harrison A. Williams (D) | 97th (1981–1983) | Bill Bradley (D) |
| Nicholas F. Brady (R) | 97th (1981–1983) | Bill Bradley (D) |
| Frank Lautenberg (D) | 97th (1981–1983) | Bill Bradley (D) |
| Frank Lautenberg (D) | 98th (1983–1985) | Bill Bradley (D) |
| Frank Lautenberg (D) | 99th (1985–1987) | Bill Bradley (D) |
| Frank Lautenberg (D) | 100th (1987–1989) | Bill Bradley (D) |
| Frank Lautenberg (D) | 101st (1989–1991) | Bill Bradley (D) |
| Frank Lautenberg (D) | 102nd (1991–1993) | Bill Bradley (D) |
| Frank Lautenberg (D) | 103rd (1993–1995) | Bill Bradley (D) |
| Frank Lautenberg (D) | 104th (1995–1997) | Bill Bradley (D) |
| Frank Lautenberg (D) | 105th (1997–1999) | Robert Torricelli (D) |
| Frank Lautenberg (D) | 106th (1999–2001) | Robert Torricelli (D) |
| Jon Corzine (D) | 107th (2001–2003) | Robert Torricelli (D) |
| Jon Corzine (D) | 108th (2003–2005) | Frank Lautenberg (D) |
| Jon Corzine (D) | 109th (2005–2007) | Frank Lautenberg (D) |
| Bob Menendez (D) | 109th (2005–2007) | Frank Lautenberg (D) |
| Bob Menendez (D) | 110th (2007–2009) | Frank Lautenberg (D) |
| Bob Menendez (D) | 111th (2009–2011) | Frank Lautenberg (D) |
| Bob Menendez (D) | 112th (2011–2013) | Frank Lautenberg (D) |
| Bob Menendez (D) | 113th (2013–2015) | Frank Lautenberg (D) |
| Bob Menendez (D) | 113th (2013–2015) | Jeffrey Chiesa (R) |
| Bob Menendez (D) | 113th (2013–2015) | Cory Booker (D) |
| Bob Menendez (D) | 114th (2015–2017) | Cory Booker (D) |
| Bob Menendez (D) | 115th (2017–2019) | Cory Booker (D) |
| Bob Menendez (D) | 116th (2019–2021) | Cory Booker (D) |
| Bob Menendez (D) | 117th (2021–2023) | Cory Booker (D) |
| Bob Menendez (D) | 118th (2023–2025) | Cory Booker (D) |
| George Helmy (D) | 118th (2023–2025) | Cory Booker (D) |
| Andy Kim (D) | 118th (2023–2025) | Cory Booker (D) |
| Andy Kim (D) | 119th (2025–2027) | Cory Booker (D) |
| Andy Kim (D) | 120th (2027–2029) | Cory Booker (D) |

== United States House of Representatives ==
=== Current members ===
Current U.S. representatives from New Jersey
| District | Member (Residence) | Party | Incumbent since | CPVI (2025) | District map |
|---|---|---|---|---|---|
| 1st | Donald Norcross (Camden) | Democratic | November 12, 2014 | D+10 | |
| 2nd | Jeff Van Drew (Dennis Township) | Republican | January 3, 2019 | R+5 | |
| 3rd | Herb Conaway (Delran) | Democratic | January 3, 2025 | D+5 | |
| 4th | Chris Smith (Manchester Township) | Republican | January 3, 1981 | R+14 | |
| 5th | Josh Gottheimer (Tenafly) | Democratic | January 3, 2017 | D+2 | |
| 6th | Frank Pallone (Long Branch) | Democratic | November 8, 1988 | D+5 | |
| 7th | Thomas Kean Jr. (Westfield) | Republican | January 3, 2023 | EVEN | |
| 8th | Rob Menendez (Jersey City) | Democratic | January 3, 2023 | D+15 | |
| 9th | Nellie Pou (North Haledon) | Democratic | January 3, 2025 | D+2 | |
| 10th | LaMonica McIver (Newark) | Democratic | September 18, 2024 | D+27 | |
| 11th | Analilia Mejia (Glen Ridge) | Democratic | April 16, 2026 | D+5 | |
| 12th | Bonnie Watson Coleman (Ewing Township) | Democratic | January 3, 2015 | D+13 | |

=== Historical members ===
==== 1789–1843 ====
| Congress | Statewide at-large seats elected on a general ticket. | | | | | |
| Congress | Seat A | Seat B | Seat C | Seat D | Seat E | |
|---|---|---|---|---|---|---|
| 1st (1789–1791) | Elias Boudinot (PA) | Lambert; Cadwalader (PA) | James; Schureman (PA) | Thomas; Sinnickson (PA) | Seat E | |
| 2nd (1791–1793) | Elias Boudinot (PA) | Abraham Clark (PA) | Jonathan Dayton (PA) | Aaron Kitchell (PA) | Seat E | |
| 3rd (1793–1795) | Elias Boudinot (PA) | Abraham Clark (PA) | Jonathan Dayton (PA) | John Beatty (PA) | Lambert; Cadwalader (PA) | |
| 3rd (1793–1795) | Elias Boudinot (PA) | Aaron Kitchell (PA) | Jonathan Dayton (PA) | John Beatty (PA) | Lambert; Cadwalader (PA) | |
| 4th (1795–1797) | Mark Thomson (F) | Aaron Kitchell (F) | Jonathan Dayton (F) | Thomas Henderson (F) | Isaac Smith (F) | |
| 5th (1797–1799) | Mark Thomson (F) | James H. Imlay (F) | Jonathan Dayton (F) | James Schureman (F) | Thomas; Sinnickson (F) | |
| Congress | District | | | | | |
| Congress | 1st | 2nd | 3rd | 4th | 5th | |
| 6th (1799–1801) | John Condit (DR) | Aaron Kitchell (DR) | James Linn (DR) | James H. Imlay (F) | Franklin Davenport (F) | |
| Congress | Statewide at-large seats elected on a general ticket. | | | | | |
| Congress | Seat A | Seat B | Seat C | Seat D | Seat E | Seat F |
| 7th (1801–1803) | John Condit (DR) | Ebenezer Elmer (DR) | William Helms (DR) | James Mott (DR) | Henry Southard (DR) | Seat F |
| 8th (1803–1805) | Adam Boyd (DR) | Ebenezer Elmer (DR) | William Helms (DR) | James Mott (DR) | Henry Southard (DR) | James Sloan (DR) |
| 9th (1805–1807) | Ezra Darby (DR) | Ebenezer Elmer (DR) | William Helms (DR) | John Lambert (DR) | Henry Southard (DR) | James Sloan (DR) |
| 10th (1807–1809) | Ezra Darby (DR) | Thomas; Newbold (DR) | William Helms (DR) | John Lambert (DR) | Henry Southard (DR) | James Sloan (DR) |
| 10th (1807–1809) | Adam Boyd (DR) | Thomas; Newbold (DR) | William Helms (DR) | John Lambert (DR) | Henry Southard (DR) | James Sloan (DR) |
| 11th (1809–1811) | Adam Boyd (DR) | Thomas; Newbold (DR) | William Helms (DR) | James Cox (DR) | Henry Southard (DR) | Jacob Hufty (DR) |
| 11th (1809–1811) | Adam Boyd (DR) | Thomas; Newbold (DR) | William Helms (DR) | John A. Scudder (DR) | Henry Southard (DR) | Jacob Hufty (DR) |
| 12th (1811–1813) | Adam Boyd (DR) | Thomas; Newbold (DR) | Lewis Condict (DR) | George C. Maxwell (DR) | James Morgan (DR) | Jacob Hufty (DR) |
| Congress | 3 districts with general tickets | | | | | |
| Congress | 1st district | | 2nd district | | 3rd district | |
| Congress | Seat A | Seat B | Seat A | Seat B | Seat A | Seat B |
| 13th (1813–1815) | Lewis Condict (DR) | Thomas Ward (DR) | James Schureman (F) | Richard Stockton (F) | William Coxe Jr. (F) | Jacob Hufty (F) |
| 13th (1813–1815) | Lewis Condict (DR) | Thomas Ward (DR) | James Schureman (F) | Richard Stockton (F) | William Coxe Jr. (F) | Thomas Bines (DR) |
| Congress | Elected at-large statewide on a general ticket. | | | | | |
| Congress | Seat A | Seat B | Seat C | Seat D | Seat E | Seat F |
| 14th (1815–1817) | Lewis Condict (DR) | Thomas Ward (DR) | Benjamin Bennet (DR) | Henry Southard (DR) | Ezra Baker (DR) | Ephraim; Bateman (DR) |
| 15th (1817–1819) | Charles Kinsey (DR) | John Linn (DR) | Benjamin Bennet (DR) | Henry Southard (DR) | Joseph; Bloomfield (DR) | Ephraim; Bateman (DR) |
| 16th (1819–1821) | John Condit (DR) | John Linn (DR) | Bernard Smith (DR) | Henry Southard (DR) | Joseph; Bloomfield (DR) | Ephraim; Bateman (DR) |
| 16th (1819–1821) | Charles Kinsey (DR) | John Linn (DR) | Bernard Smith (DR) | Henry Southard (DR) | Joseph; Bloomfield (DR) | Ephraim; Bateman (DR) |
| 17th (1821–1823) | George; Cassedy (DR) (Note: Supported the Jackson faction in the 1824 United States presidential election.) | Lewis; Condict (DR) | George; Holcombe (DR) | James Matlack (DR) (Note: Supported the Adams-Clay faction in the 1824 United States presidential election.) | Samuel Swan (DR) | Ephraim; Bateman (DR) |
| 18th (1823–1825) | George; Cassedy (DR) | Lewis; Condict (DR) | George; Holcombe (DR) | James Matlack (DR) | Samuel Swan (DR) | Daniel; Garrison (DR) |
| 19th (1825–1827) | George Cassedy (J) | Lewis Condict (NR) | George Holcombe (J) | Ebenezer Tucker (NR) | Samuel Swan (NR) | Daniel Garrison (J) |
| 20th (1827–1829) | Hedge Thompson (NR) | Lewis Condict (NR) | George Holcombe (J) | Ebenezer Tucker (NR) | Samuel Swan (NR) | Isaac Pierson (NR) |
| 20th (1827–1829) | Thomas; Sinnickson (NR) | Lewis Condict (NR) | James F. Randolph (NR) | Ebenezer Tucker (NR) | Samuel Swan (NR) | Isaac Pierson (NR) |
| 21st (1829–1831) | Richard M. Cooper (NR) | Lewis Condict (NR) | James F. Randolph (NR) | Thomas H. Hughes (NR) | Samuel Swan (NR) | Isaac Pierson (NR) |
| 22nd (1831–1833) | Richard M. Cooper (NR) | Lewis Condict (NR) | James F. Randolph (NR) | Thomas H. Hughes (NR) | Isaac Southard (NR) | Silas Condit (NR) |
| 23rd (1833–1835) | Philemon Dickerson (J) | Samuel Fowler (J) | Thomas Lee (J) | James Parker (J) | F. S. Schenck (J) | William Norton; Shinn (J) |
| 24th (1835–1837) | Philemon Dickerson (J) | Samuel Fowler (J) | Thomas Lee (J) | James Parker (J) | F. S. Schenck (J) | William Norton; Shinn (J) |
| 24th (1835–1837) | William Chetwood (W) | Samuel Fowler (J) | Thomas Lee (J) | James Parker (J) | F. S. Schenck (J) | William Norton; Shinn (J) |
| 25th (1837–1839) | Joseph Fitz; Randolph (W) | John Bancker; Aycrigg (W) | William Halstead (W) | John P. B. Maxwell (W) | Charles C. Stratton (W) | Thomas Jones; Yorke (W) |
| 26th (1839–1841) | Joseph Fitz; Randolph (W) | William R. Cooper (D) | Philemon; Dickerson (D) | Joseph Kille (D) | Daniel Bailey; Ryall (D) | Peter D. Vroom (D) |
| 27th (1841–1843) | Joseph Fitz; Randolph (W) | John Bancker; Aycrigg (W) | William Halstead (W) | John P. B. Maxwell (W) | Charles C. Stratton (W) | Thomas Jones; Yorke (W) |

==== 1843–1873 ====
| Congress | 1st district | 2nd district | 3rd district | 4th district | 5th district |
|---|---|---|---|---|---|
| 28th (1843–1845) | Lucius Elmer (D) | George Sykes (D) | Isaac G. Farlee (D) | Littleton Kirkpatrick (D) | William Wright (IW) |
| 29th (1845–1847) | James G. Hampton (W) | Samuel G. Wright (W) | John Runk (W) | Joseph E. Edsall (D) | William Wright (W) |
| 29th (1845–1847) | James G. Hampton (W) | George Sykes (D) | John Runk (W) | Joseph E. Edsall (D) | William Wright (W) |
| 30th (1847–1849) | James G. Hampton (W) | William A. Newell (W) | Joseph E. Edsall (D) | John Van Dyke (W) | Dudley S. Gregory (W) |
| 31st (1849–1851) | Andrew K. Hay (W) | William A. Newell (W) | Isaac Wildrick (D) | John Van Dyke (W) | James G. King (W) |
| 32nd (1851–1853) | Nathan T. Stratton (D) | Charles Skelton (D) | Isaac Wildrick (D) | George H. Brown (W) | Rodman M. Price (D) |
| 33rd (1853–1855) | Nathan T. Stratton (D) | Charles Skelton (D) | Samuel Lilly (D) | George Vail (D) | Alexander C. M. Pennington (W) |
| 34th (1855–1857) | Isaiah D. Clawson (O) | George R. Robbins (O) | James Bishop (O) | George Vail (D) | Alexander C. M. Pennington (O) |
| 35th (1857–1859) | Isaiah D. Clawson (R) | George R. Robbins (R) | Garnett Adrain (D) (Note: Anti-Lecompton Democrat) | John Huyler (D) | Jacob R. Wortendyke (D) |
| 36th (1859–1861) | John T. Nixon (R) | John L. N. Stratton (R) | Garnett Adrain (D) | Jetur R. Riggs (D) | William Pennington (R) |
| 37th (1861–1863) | John T. Nixon (R) | John L. N. Stratton (R) | William G. Steele (D) | George T. Cobb (D) | Nehemiah Perry (D) |
| 38th (1863–1865) | John F. Starr (R) | George Middleton (D) | William G. Steele (D) | Andrew J. Rogers (D) | Nehemiah Perry (D) |
| 39th (1865–1867) | John F. Starr (R) | William A. Newell (R) | Charles Sitgreaves (D) | Andrew J. Rogers (D) | Edwin R. V. Wright (D) |
| 40th (1867–1869) | William Moore (R) | Charles Haight (D) | Charles Sitgreaves (D) | John Hill (R) | George A. Halsey (R) |
| 41st (1869–1871) | William Moore (R) | Charles Haight (D) | John T. Bird (D) | John Hill (R) | Orestes Cleveland (D) |
| 42nd (1871–1873) | John W. Hazelton (R) | Samuel C. Forker (D) | John T. Bird (D) | John Hill (R) | George A. Halsey (R) |

==== 1873–1903 ====
| Congress | District | | | | | | | |
| Congress | 1st | 2nd | 3rd | 4th | 5th | 6th | 7th | 8th |
|---|---|---|---|---|---|---|---|---|
| 43rd (1873–1875) | John W. Hazelton (R) | Samuel A. Dobbins (R) | Amos Clark Jr. (R) | Robert Hamilton (D) | William Walter; Phelps (R) | Marcus Lawrence; Ward (R) | Isaac W. Scudder (R) | |
| 44th (1875–1877) | Clement Hall; Sinnickson (R) | Samuel A. Dobbins (R) | Miles Ross (D) | Robert Hamilton (D) | Augustus W. Cutler (D) | Frederick H. Teese (D) | Augustus A. Hardenbergh (D) | |
| 45th (1877–1879) | Clement Hall; Sinnickson (R) | John H. Pugh (R) | Miles Ross (D) | Alvah A. Clark (D) | Augustus W. Cutler (D) | Thomas B. Peddie (R) | Augustus A. Hardenbergh (D) | |
| 46th (1879–1881) | George M. Robeson (R) | Hezekiah B. Smith (D) | Miles Ross (D) | Alvah A. Clark (D) | Charles H. Voorhis (R) | John L. Blake (R) | Lewis A. Brigham (R) | |
| 47th (1881–1883) | George M. Robeson (R) | J. Hart Brewer (R) | Miles Ross (D) | Henry S. Harris (D) | John Hill (R) | Phineas Jones (R) | Augustus A. Hardenbergh (D) | |
| 48th (1883–1885) | Thomas M. Ferrell (D) | J. Hart Brewer (R) | John Kean (R) | Benjamin Franklin; Howey (R) | William Walter; Phelps (R) | William H. F. Fiedler (D) | William McAdoo (D) | |
| 49th (1885–1887) | George Hires (R) | James Buchanan (R) | Robert S. Green (D) | James N. Pidcock (D) | William Walter; Phelps (R) | Herman Lehlbach (R) | William McAdoo (D) | |
| 50th (1887–1889) | George Hires (R) | James Buchanan (R) | John Kean (R) | James N. Pidcock (D) | William Walter; Phelps (R) | Herman Lehlbach (R) | William McAdoo (D) | |
| 51st (1889–1891) | Christopher A. Bergen (R) | James Buchanan (R) | Jacob Augustus; Geissenhainer (D) | Samuel Fowler (D) | Charles D. Beckwith (R) | Herman Lehlbach (R) | William McAdoo (D) | |
| 52nd (1891–1893) | Christopher A. Bergen (R) | James Buchanan (R) | Jacob Augustus; Geissenhainer (D) | Samuel Fowler (D) | Cornelius A. Cadmus (D) | Thomas Dunn; English (D) | Edward F. McDonald (D) | |
| 53rd (1893–1895) | Henry C. Loudenslager (R) | John J. Gardner (R) | Jacob Augustus; Geissenhainer (D) | Johnston Cornish (D) | Cornelius A. Cadmus (D) | Thomas Dunn; English (D) | George B. Fielder (D) | John T. Dunn (D) |
| 54th (1895–1897) | Henry C. Loudenslager (R) | John J. Gardner (R) | Benjamin F. Howell (R) | Mahlon Pitney (R) | James F. Stewart (R) | Richard W. Parker (R) | Thomas McEwan Jr. (R) | Charles N. Fowler (R) |
| 55th (1897–1899) | Henry C. Loudenslager (R) | John J. Gardner (R) | Benjamin F. Howell (R) | Mahlon Pitney (R) | James F. Stewart (R) | Richard W. Parker (R) | Thomas McEwan Jr. (R) | Charles N. Fowler (R) |
| 56th (1899–1901) | Henry C. Loudenslager (R) | John J. Gardner (R) | Benjamin F. Howell (R) | Joshua S. Salmon (D) | James F. Stewart (R) | Richard W. Parker (R) | William D. Daly (D) | Charles N. Fowler (R) |
| 57th (1901–1903) | Henry C. Loudenslager (R) | John J. Gardner (R) | Benjamin F. Howell (R) | Joshua S. Salmon (D) | James F. Stewart (R) | Richard W. Parker (R) | Allan L. McDermott (D) | Charles N. Fowler (R) |
| 57th (1901–1903) | Henry C. Loudenslager (R) | John J. Gardner (R) | Benjamin F. Howell (R) | De Witt C. Flanagan (D) | James F. Stewart (R) | Richard W. Parker (R) | Allan L. McDermott (D) | Charles N. Fowler (R) |

==== 1903–1913 ====
| Congress | District | | | | | | | | | |
| Congress | 1st | 2nd | 3rd | 4th | 5th | 6th | 7th | 8th | 9th | 10th |
|---|---|---|---|---|---|---|---|---|---|---|
| 58th (1903–1905) | Henry C. Loudenslager (R) | John J. Gardner (R) | Benjamin; F. Howell (R) | William M. Lanning (R) | Charles N. Fowler (R) | William; Hughes (D) | Richard W. Parker (R) | William H. Wiley (R) | Allan; Benny (D) | Allan L. McDermott (D) |
| 59th (1905–1907) | Henry C. Loudenslager (R) | John J. Gardner (R) | Benjamin; F. Howell (R) | Ira W. Wood (R) | Charles N. Fowler (R) | Henry C. Allen (R) | Richard W. Parker (R) | William H. Wiley (R) | Marshall; Van Winkle (R) | Allan L. McDermott (D) |
| 60th (1907–1909) | Henry C. Loudenslager (R) | John J. Gardner (R) | Benjamin; F. Howell (R) | Ira W. Wood (R) | Charles N. Fowler (R) | William; Hughes (D) | Richard W. Parker (R) | Le Gage; Pratt (D) | Eugene W. Leake (D) | James A. Hamill (D) |
| 61st (1909–1911) | Henry C. Loudenslager (R) | John J. Gardner (R) | Benjamin; F. Howell (R) | Ira W. Wood (R) | Charles N. Fowler (R) | William; Hughes (D) | Richard W. Parker (R) | William H. Wiley (R) | Eugene F. Kinkead (D) | James A. Hamill (D) |
| 62nd (1911–1913) | Henry C. Loudenslager (R) | John J. Gardner (R) | Thomas J. Scully (D) | Ira W. Wood (R) | William E. Tuttle Jr. (D) | William; Hughes (D) | Edward W. Townsend (D) | Walter I. McCoy (D) | Eugene F. Kinkead (D) | James A. Hamill (D) |
| 62nd (1911–1913) | William J. Browning (R) | John J. Gardner (R) | Thomas J. Scully (D) | Ira W. Wood (R) | William E. Tuttle Jr. (D) | Archibald C. Hart (D) | Edward W. Townsend (D) | Walter I. McCoy (D) | Eugene F. Kinkead (D) | James A. Hamill (D) |

==== 1913–1933 ====
| Congress | District | | | | | | | | | | | |
| Congress | 1st | 2nd | 3rd | 4th | 5th | 6th | 7th | 8th | 9th | 10th | 11th | 12th |
|---|---|---|---|---|---|---|---|---|---|---|---|---|
| 63rd (1913–1915) | William J. Browning (R) | J. Thompson; Baker (D) | Thomas J. Scully (D) | Allan B. Walsh (D) | William E. Tuttle Jr. (D) | Lewis J. Martin (D) | Robert G. Bremner (D) | Eugene F. Kinkead (D) | Walter I. McCoy (D) | Edward W. Townsend (D) | John J. Eagan (D) | James A. Hamill (D) |
| 63rd (1913–1915) | William J. Browning (R) | J. Thompson; Baker (D) | Thomas J. Scully (D) | Allan B. Walsh (D) | William E. Tuttle Jr. (D) | Archibald C. Hart (D) | Dow H. Drukker (R) | Eugene F. Kinkead (D) | Richard W. Parker (R) | Edward W. Townsend (D) | John J. Eagan (D) | James A. Hamill (D) |
| 64th (1915–1917) | William J. Browning (R) | Isaac; Bacharach (R) | Thomas J. Scully (D) | Elijah C. Hutchinson (R) | John H. Capstick (R) | Archibald C. Hart (D) | Dow H. Drukker (R) | Edward W. Gray (R) | Richard W. Parker (R) | Frederick R. Lehlbach (R) | John J. Eagan (D) | James A. Hamill (D) |
| 65th (1917–1919) | William J. Browning (R) | Isaac; Bacharach (R) | Thomas J. Scully (D) | Elijah C. Hutchinson (R) | John H. Capstick (R) | John R. Ramsey (R) | Dow H. Drukker (R) | Edward W. Gray (R) | Richard W. Parker (R) | Frederick R. Lehlbach (R) | John J. Eagan (D) | James A. Hamill (D) |
| 65th (1917–1919) | William J. Browning (R) | Isaac; Bacharach (R) | Thomas J. Scully (D) | Elijah C. Hutchinson (R) | William F. Birch (R) | John R. Ramsey (R) | Dow H. Drukker (R) | Edward W. Gray (R) | Richard W. Parker (R) | Frederick R. Lehlbach (R) | John J. Eagan (D) | James A. Hamill (D) |
| 66th (1919–1921) | William J. Browning (R) | Isaac; Bacharach (R) | Thomas J. Scully (D) | Elijah C. Hutchinson (R) | Ernest R. Ackerman (R) | John R. Ramsey (R) | Amos H. Radcliffe (R) | Cornelius A. McGlennon (D) | Daniel F. Minahan (D) | Frederick R. Lehlbach (R) | John J. Eagan (D) | James A. Hamill (D) |
| 67th (1921–1923) | Francis F. Patterson Jr. (R) | Isaac; Bacharach (R) | T. Frank; Appleby (R) | Elijah C. Hutchinson (R) | Ernest R. Ackerman (R) | Randolph; Perkins (R) | Amos H. Radcliffe (R) | Herbert W. Taylor (R) | Richard W. Parker (R) | Frederick R. Lehlbach (R) | Archibald E. Olpp (R) | Charles F. X. O'Brien (D) |
| 68th (1923–1925) | Francis F. Patterson Jr. (R) | Isaac; Bacharach (R) | Elmer H. Geran (D) | Charles Browne (D) | Ernest R. Ackerman (R) | Randolph; Perkins (R) | George N. Seger (R) | Frank Joseph; McNulty (D) | Daniel F. Minahan (D) | Frederick R. Lehlbach (R) | John J. Eagan (D) | Charles F. X. O'Brien (D) |
| 69th (1925–1927) | Francis F. Patterson Jr. (R) | Isaac; Bacharach (R) | Stewart H. Appleby (R) (Note: Stewart Appleby took office November 3, 1925 after a special election to fill the vacant seat left by his father T. Frank Appleby who died before taking office) | Charles Aubrey; Eaton (R) | Ernest R. Ackerman (R) | Randolph; Perkins (R) | George N. Seger (R) | Herbert W. Taylor (R) | Franklin W. Fort (R) | Frederick R. Lehlbach (R) | Oscar L. Auf der Heide (D) | Mary Teresa; Norton (D) |
| 70th (1927–1929) | Charles A. Wolverton (R) | Isaac; Bacharach (R) | Harold G. Hoffman (R) | Charles Aubrey; Eaton (R) | Ernest R. Ackerman (R) | Randolph; Perkins (R) | George N. Seger (R) | Paul J. Moore (D) | Franklin W. Fort (R) | Frederick R. Lehlbach (R) | Oscar L. Auf der Heide (D) | Mary Teresa; Norton (D) |
| 71st (1929–1931) | Charles A. Wolverton (R) | Isaac; Bacharach (R) | Harold G. Hoffman (R) | Charles Aubrey; Eaton (R) | Ernest R. Ackerman (R) | Randolph; Perkins (R) | George N. Seger (R) | Fred A. Hartley Jr. (R) | Franklin W. Fort (R) | Frederick R. Lehlbach (R) | Oscar L. Auf der Heide (D) | Mary Teresa; Norton (D) |
| 72nd (1931–1933) | Charles A. Wolverton (R) | Isaac; Bacharach (R) | William H. Sutphin (D) | Charles Aubrey; Eaton (R) | Percy H. Stewart (D) | Randolph; Perkins (R) | George N. Seger (R) | Fred A. Hartley Jr. (R) | Peter A. Cavicchia (R) | Frederick R. Lehlbach (R) | Oscar L. Auf der Heide (D) | Mary Teresa; Norton (D) |

==== 1933–1983 ====
| Congress | District | | | | | | | | | | | | | | |
| Congress | 1st | 2nd | 3rd | 4th | 5th | 6th | 7th | 8th | 9th | 10th | 11th | 12th | 13th | 14th | 15th |
|---|---|---|---|---|---|---|---|---|---|---|---|---|---|---|---|
| 73rd (1933–1935) | Charles A. Wolverton (R) | Isaac; Bacharach (R) | William H. Sutphin (D) | D. Lane; Powers (R) | Charles Aubrey; Eaton (R) | Donald H. McLean (R) | Randolph; Perkins (R) | George N. Seger (R) | Edward A. Kenney (D) | Fred A. Hartley Jr. (R) | Peter A. Cavicchia (R) | Frederick R. Lehlbach (R) | Mary Teresa; Norton (D) | Oscar L. Auf der Heide (D) | |
| 74th (1935–1937) | Charles A. Wolverton (R) | Isaac; Bacharach (R) | William H. Sutphin (D) | D. Lane; Powers (R) | Charles Aubrey; Eaton (R) | Donald H. McLean (R) | Randolph; Perkins (R) | George N. Seger (R) | Edward A. Kenney (D) | Fred A. Hartley Jr. (R) | Peter A. Cavicchia (R) | Frederick R. Lehlbach (R) | Mary Teresa; Norton (D) | Edward J. Hart (D) | |
| 75th (1937–1939) | Charles A. Wolverton (R) | Elmer H. Wene (D) | William H. Sutphin (D) | D. Lane; Powers (R) | Charles Aubrey; Eaton (R) | Donald H. McLean (R) | J. Parnell; Thomas (R) | George N. Seger (R) | Edward A. Kenney (D) | Fred A. Hartley Jr. (R) | Edward L. O'Neill (D) | Frank William; Towey Jr. (D) | Mary Teresa; Norton (D) | Edward J. Hart (D) | |
| 76th (1939–1941) | Charles A. Wolverton (R) | Walter S. Jeffries (R) | William H. Sutphin (D) | D. Lane; Powers (R) | Charles Aubrey; Eaton (R) | Donald H. McLean (R) | J. Parnell; Thomas (R) | George N. Seger (R) | Frank C. Osmers Jr. (R) | Fred A. Hartley Jr. (R) | Albert L. Vreeland (R) | Robert; Kean (R) | Mary Teresa; Norton (D) | Edward J. Hart (D) | |
| 77th (1941–1943) | Charles A. Wolverton (R) | Elmer H. Wene (D) | William H. Sutphin (D) | D. Lane; Powers (R) | Charles Aubrey; Eaton (R) | Donald H. McLean (R) | J. Parnell; Thomas (R) | Gordon; Canfield (R) | Frank C. Osmers Jr. (R) | Fred A. Hartley Jr. (R) | Albert L. Vreeland (R) | Robert; Kean (R) | Mary Teresa; Norton (D) | Edward J. Hart (D) | |
| 78th (1943–1945) | Charles A. Wolverton (R) | Elmer H. Wene (D) | James C. Auchincloss (R) | D. Lane; Powers (R) | Charles Aubrey; Eaton (R) | Donald H. McLean (R) | J. Parnell; Thomas (R) | Gordon; Canfield (R) | Harry L. Towe (R) | Fred A. Hartley Jr. (R) | Frank; Sundstrom (R) | Robert; Kean (R) | Mary Teresa; Norton (D) | Edward J. Hart (D) | |
| 79th (1945–1947) | Charles A. Wolverton (R) | T. Millet; Hand (R) | James C. Auchincloss (R) | D. Lane; Powers (R) | Charles Aubrey; Eaton (R) | Clifford P. Case (R) | J. Parnell; Thomas (R) | Gordon; Canfield (R) | Harry L. Towe (R) | Fred A. Hartley Jr. (R) | Frank; Sundstrom (R) | Robert; Kean (R) | Mary Teresa; Norton (D) | Edward J. Hart (D) | |
| 80th (1947–1949) | Charles A. Wolverton (R) | T. Millet; Hand (R) | James C. Auchincloss (R) | Frank A. Mathews Jr. (R) | Charles Aubrey; Eaton (R) | Clifford P. Case (R) | J. Parnell; Thomas (R) | Gordon; Canfield (R) | Harry L. Towe (R) | Fred A. Hartley Jr. (R) | Frank; Sundstrom (R) | Robert; Kean (R) | Mary Teresa; Norton (D) | Edward J. Hart (D) | |
| 81st (1949–1951) | Charles A. Wolverton (R) | T. Millet; Hand (R) | James C. Auchincloss (R) | Charles R. Howell (D) | Charles Aubrey; Eaton (R) | Clifford P. Case (R) | J. Parnell; Thomas (R) | Gordon; Canfield (R) | Harry L. Towe (R) | Peter W. Rodino (D) | Hugh J. Addonizio (D) | Robert; Kean (R) | Mary Teresa; Norton (D) | Edward J. Hart (D) | |
| 82nd (1951–1953) | Charles A. Wolverton (R) | T. Millet; Hand (R) | James C. Auchincloss (R) | Charles R. Howell (D) | Charles Aubrey; Eaton (R) | Clifford P. Case (R) | William B. Widnall (R) | Gordon; Canfield (R) | Harry L. Towe (R) | Peter W. Rodino (D) | Hugh J. Addonizio (D) | Robert; Kean (R) | Alfred Dennis; Sieminski (D) | Edward J. Hart (D) | |
| 83rd (1953–1955) | Charles A. Wolverton (R) | T. Millet; Hand (R) | James C. Auchincloss (R) | Charles R. Howell (D) | Peter; Frelinghuysen; Jr. (R) | Harrison A. Williams (D) | William B. Widnall (R) | Gordon; Canfield (R) | Frank C. Osmers Jr. (R) | Peter W. Rodino (D) | Hugh J. Addonizio (D) | Robert; Kean (R) | Alfred Dennis; Sieminski (D) | Edward J. Hart (D) | |
| 84th (1955–1957) | Charles A. Wolverton (R) | T. Millet; Hand (R) | James C. Auchincloss (R) | Frank; Thompson (D) | Peter; Frelinghuysen; Jr. (R) | Harrison A. Williams (D) | William B. Widnall (R) | Gordon; Canfield (R) | Frank C. Osmers Jr. (R) | Peter W. Rodino (D) | Hugh J. Addonizio (D) | Robert; Kean (R) | Alfred Dennis; Sieminski (D) | T. James; Tumulty (D) | |
| 85th (1957–1959) | Charles A. Wolverton (R) | Milton W. Glenn (R) | James C. Auchincloss (R) | Frank; Thompson (D) | Peter; Frelinghuysen; Jr. (R) | Florence P. Dwyer (R) | William B. Widnall (R) | Gordon; Canfield (R) | Frank C. Osmers Jr. (R) | Peter W. Rodino (D) | Hugh J. Addonizio (D) | Robert; Kean (R) | Alfred Dennis; Sieminski (D) | Vincent J. Dellay (R) | |
| 86th (1959–1961) | William T. Cahill (R) | Milton W. Glenn (R) | James C. Auchincloss (R) | Frank; Thompson (D) | Peter; Frelinghuysen; Jr. (R) | Florence P. Dwyer (R) | William B. Widnall (R) | Gordon; Canfield (R) | Frank C. Osmers Jr. (R) | Peter W. Rodino (D) | Hugh J. Addonizio (D) | George M. Wallhauser (R) | Neil; Gallagher (D) | Dominick V. Daniels (D) | |
| 87th (1961–1963) | William T. Cahill (R) | Milton W. Glenn (R) | James C. Auchincloss (R) | Frank; Thompson (D) | Peter; Frelinghuysen; Jr. (R) | Florence P. Dwyer (R) | William B. Widnall (R) | Charles S. Joelson (D) | Frank C. Osmers Jr. (R) | Peter W. Rodino (D) | Hugh J. Addonizio (D) | George M. Wallhauser (R) | Neil; Gallagher (D) | Dominick V. Daniels (D) | |
| 88th (1963–1965) | William T. Cahill (R) | Milton W. Glenn (R) | James C. Auchincloss (R) | Frank; Thompson (D) | Peter; Frelinghuysen; Jr. (R) | Florence P. Dwyer (R) | William B. Widnall (R) | Charles S. Joelson (D) | Frank C. Osmers Jr. (R) | Peter W. Rodino (D) | Joseph; Minish (D) | George M. Wallhauser (R) | Neil; Gallagher (D) | Dominick V. Daniels (D) | Edward J. Patten (D) |
| 89th (1965–1967) | William T. Cahill (R) | Thomas C. McGrath Jr. (D) | James J. Howard (D) | Frank; Thompson (D) | Peter; Frelinghuysen; Jr. (R) | Florence P. Dwyer (R) | William B. Widnall (R) | Charles S. Joelson (D) | Henry; Helstoski (D) | Peter W. Rodino (D) | Joseph; Minish (D) | Paul J. Krebs (D) | Neil; Gallagher (D) | Dominick V. Daniels (D) | Edward J. Patten (D) |
| 90th (1967–1969) | John E. Hunt (R) | Charles W. Sandman Jr. (R) | James J. Howard (D) | Frank; Thompson (D) | Peter; Frelinghuysen; Jr. (R) | William T. Cahill (R) | William B. Widnall (R) | Charles S. Joelson (D) | Henry; Helstoski (D) | Peter W. Rodino (D) | Joseph; Minish (D) | Florence P. Dwyer (R) | Neil; Gallagher (D) | Dominick V. Daniels (D) | Edward J. Patten (D) |
| 91st (1969–1971) | John E. Hunt (R) | Charles W. Sandman Jr. (R) | James J. Howard (D) | Frank; Thompson (D) | Peter; Frelinghuysen; Jr. (R) | William T. Cahill (R) | William B. Widnall (R) | Robert A. Roe (D) | Henry; Helstoski (D) | Peter W. Rodino (D) | Joseph; Minish (D) | Florence P. Dwyer (R) | Neil; Gallagher (D) | Dominick V. Daniels (D) | Edward J. Patten (D) |
| 92nd (1971–1973) | John E. Hunt (R) | Charles W. Sandman Jr. (R) | James J. Howard (D) | Frank; Thompson (D) | Peter; Frelinghuysen; Jr. (R) | Edwin B. Forsythe (R) | William B. Widnall (R) | Robert A. Roe (D) | Henry; Helstoski (D) | Peter W. Rodino (D) | Joseph; Minish (D) | Florence P. Dwyer (R) | Neil; Gallagher (D) | Dominick V. Daniels (D) | Edward J. Patten (D) |
| 93rd (1973–1975) | John E. Hunt (R) | Charles W. Sandman Jr. (R) | James J. Howard (D) | Frank; Thompson (D) | Peter; Frelinghuysen; Jr. (R) | Edwin B. Forsythe (R) | William B. Widnall (R) | Robert A. Roe (D) | Henry; Helstoski (D) | Peter W. Rodino (D) | Joseph; Minish (D) | Matt Rinaldo (R) | Joseph J. Maraziti (R) | Dominick V. Daniels (D) | Edward J. Patten (D) |
| 94th (1975–1977) | James; Florio (D) | William J. Hughes (D) | James J. Howard (D) | Frank; Thompson (D) | Millicent; Fenwick (R) | Edwin B. Forsythe (R) | Andrew; Maguire (D) | Robert A. Roe (D) | Henry; Helstoski (D) | Peter W. Rodino (D) | Joseph; Minish (D) | Matt Rinaldo (R) | Helen Stevenson; Meyner (D) | Dominick V. Daniels (D) | Edward J. Patten (D) |
| 95th (1977–1979) | James; Florio (D) | William J. Hughes (D) | James J. Howard (D) | Frank; Thompson (D) | Millicent; Fenwick (R) | Edwin B. Forsythe (R) | Andrew; Maguire (D) | Robert A. Roe (D) | Harold C. Hollenbeck (R) | Peter W. Rodino (D) | Joseph; Minish (D) | Matt Rinaldo (R) | Helen Stevenson; Meyner (D) | Joseph A. LeFante (D) | Edward J. Patten (D) |
| 96th (1979–1981) | James; Florio (D) | William J. Hughes (D) | James J. Howard (D) | Frank; Thompson (D) | Millicent; Fenwick (R) | Edwin B. Forsythe (R) | Andrew; Maguire (D) | Robert A. Roe (D) | Harold C. Hollenbeck (R) | Peter W. Rodino (D) | Joseph; Minish (D) | Matt Rinaldo (R) | Jim; Courter (R) | Frank J. Guarini (D) | Edward J. Patten (D) |
| 97th (1981–1983) | James; Florio (D) | William J. Hughes (D) | James J. Howard (D) | Chris Smith (R) | Millicent; Fenwick (R) | Edwin B. Forsythe (R) | Marge; Roukema (R) | Robert A. Roe (D) | Harold C. Hollenbeck (R) | Peter W. Rodino (D) | Joseph; Minish (D) | Matt Rinaldo (R) | Jim; Courter (R) | Frank J. Guarini (D) | Bernard J. Dwyer (D) |

==== 1983–1993 ====
| Congress | District | | | | | | | | | | | | | |
| Congress | 1st | 2nd | 3rd | 4th | 5th | 6th | 7th | 8th | 9th | 10th | 11th | 12th | 13th | 14th |
|---|---|---|---|---|---|---|---|---|---|---|---|---|---|---|
| 98th (1983–1985) | James; Florio (D) | William J. Hughes (D) | James J. Howard (D) | Chris; Smith (R) | Marge; Roukema (R) | Bernard J. Dwyer (D) | Matt; Rinaldo (R) | Robert A. Roe (D) | Robert; Torricelli (D) | Peter W. Rodino (D) | Joseph; Minish (D) | Jim; Courter (D) | Edwin B. Forsythe (R) | Frank J. Guarini (D) |
| 99th (1985–1987) | James; Florio (D) | William J. Hughes (D) | James J. Howard (D) | Chris; Smith (R) | Marge; Roukema (R) | Bernard J. Dwyer (D) | Matt; Rinaldo (R) | Robert A. Roe (D) | Robert; Torricelli (D) | Peter W. Rodino (D) | Dean; Gallo (R) | Jim; Courter (D) | Jim; Saxton (R) | Frank J. Guarini (D) |
| 100th (1987–1989) | James; Florio (D) | William J. Hughes (D) | James J. Howard (D) | Chris; Smith (R) | Marge; Roukema (R) | Bernard J. Dwyer (D) | Matt; Rinaldo (R) | Robert A. Roe (D) | Robert; Torricelli (D) | Peter W. Rodino (D) | Dean; Gallo (R) | Jim; Courter (D) | Jim; Saxton (R) | Frank J. Guarini (D) |
| 101st (1989–1991) | James; Florio (D) | William J. Hughes (D) | Frank; Pallone (D) | Chris; Smith (R) | Marge; Roukema (R) | Bernard J. Dwyer (D) | Matt; Rinaldo (R) | Robert A. Roe (D) | Robert; Torricelli (D) | Donald M. Payne (D) | Dean; Gallo (R) | Jim; Courter (D) | Jim; Saxton (R) | Frank J. Guarini (D) |
| 102nd (1991–1993) | Rob; Andrews (D) | William J. Hughes (D) | Frank; Pallone (D) | Chris; Smith (R) | Marge; Roukema (R) | Bernard J. Dwyer (D) | Matt; Rinaldo (R) | Robert A. Roe (D) | Robert; Torricelli (D) | Donald M. Payne (D) | Dean; Gallo (R) | Dick; Zimmer (R) | Jim; Saxton (R) | Frank J. Guarini (D) |

==== 1993–present ====
| Congress | District | | | | | | | | | | | | |
| Congress | 1st | 2nd | 3rd | 4th | 5th | 6th | 7th | 8th | 9th | 10th | 11th | 12th | 13th |
|---|---|---|---|---|---|---|---|---|---|---|---|---|---|
| 103rd (1993–1995) | Rob; Andrews (D) | William J. Hughes (D) | Jim; Saxton (R) | Chris; Smith (R) | Marge; Roukema (R) | Frank; Pallone (D) | Bob; Franks (R) | Herb; Klein (D) | Robert; Torricelli (D) | Donald M. Payne (D) | Dean; Gallo (R) | Dick; Zimmer (R) | Bob; Menendez (D) |
| 104th (1995–1997) | Rob; Andrews (D) | Frank; LoBiondo (R) | Jim; Saxton (R) | Chris; Smith (R) | Marge; Roukema (R) | Frank; Pallone (D) | Bob; Franks (R) | Bill Martini (R) | Robert; Torricelli (D) | Donald M. Payne (D) | Rodney; Frelinghuysen (R) | Dick; Zimmer (R) | Bob; Menendez (D) |
| 105th (1997–1999) | Rob; Andrews (D) | Frank; LoBiondo (R) | Jim; Saxton (R) | Chris; Smith (R) | Marge; Roukema (R) | Frank; Pallone (D) | Bob; Franks (R) | Bill; Pascrell (D) | Steve; Rothman (D) | Donald M. Payne (D) | Rodney; Frelinghuysen (R) | Mike Pappas (R) | Bob; Menendez (D) |
| 106th (1999–2001) | Rob; Andrews (D) | Frank; LoBiondo (R) | Jim; Saxton (R) | Chris; Smith (R) | Marge; Roukema (R) | Frank; Pallone (D) | Bob; Franks (R) | Bill; Pascrell (D) | Steve; Rothman (D) | Donald M. Payne (D) | Rodney; Frelinghuysen (R) | Rush; Holt Jr. (D) | Bob; Menendez (D) |
| 107th (2001–2003) | Rob; Andrews (D) | Frank; LoBiondo (R) | Jim; Saxton (R) | Chris; Smith (R) | Marge; Roukema (R) | Frank; Pallone (D) | Mike; Ferguson (R) | Bill; Pascrell (D) | Steve; Rothman (D) | Donald M. Payne (D) | Rodney; Frelinghuysen (R) | Rush; Holt Jr. (D) | Bob; Menendez (D) |
| 108th (2003–2005) | Rob; Andrews (D) | Frank; LoBiondo (R) | Jim; Saxton (R) | Chris; Smith (R) | Scott; Garrett (R) | Frank; Pallone (D) | Mike; Ferguson (R) | Bill; Pascrell (D) | Steve; Rothman (D) | Donald M. Payne (D) | Rodney; Frelinghuysen (R) | Rush; Holt Jr. (D) | Bob; Menendez (D) |
| 109th (2005–2007) | Rob; Andrews (D) | Frank; LoBiondo (R) | Jim; Saxton (R) | Chris; Smith (R) | Scott; Garrett (R) | Frank; Pallone (D) | Mike; Ferguson (R) | Bill; Pascrell (D) | Steve; Rothman (D) | Donald M. Payne (D) | Rodney; Frelinghuysen (R) | Rush; Holt Jr. (D) | Bob; Menendez (D) |
| 109th (2005–2007) | Rob; Andrews (D) | Frank; LoBiondo (R) | Jim; Saxton (R) | Chris; Smith (R) | Scott; Garrett (R) | Frank; Pallone (D) | Mike; Ferguson (R) | Bill; Pascrell (D) | Steve; Rothman (D) | Donald M. Payne (D) | Rodney; Frelinghuysen (R) | Rush; Holt Jr. (D) | vacant |
| 110th (2007–2009) | Rob; Andrews (D) | Frank; LoBiondo (R) | Jim; Saxton (R) | Chris; Smith (R) | Scott; Garrett (R) | Frank; Pallone (D) | Mike; Ferguson (R) | Bill; Pascrell (D) | Steve; Rothman (D) | Donald M. Payne (D) | Rodney; Frelinghuysen (R) | Rush; Holt Jr. (D) | Albio; Sires (D) |
| 111th (2009–2011) | Rob; Andrews (D) | Frank; LoBiondo (R) | John Adler (D) | Chris; Smith (R) | Scott; Garrett (R) | Frank; Pallone (D) | Leonard; Lance (R) | Bill; Pascrell (D) | Steve; Rothman (D) | Donald M. Payne (D) | Rodney; Frelinghuysen (R) | Rush; Holt Jr. (D) | Albio; Sires (D) |
| 112th (2011–2013) | Rob; Andrews (D) | Frank; LoBiondo (R) | John; Runyan (R) | Chris; Smith (R) | Scott; Garrett (R) | Frank; Pallone (D) | Leonard; Lance (R) | Bill; Pascrell (D) | Steve; Rothman (D) | Donald M. Payne (D) | Rodney; Frelinghuysen (R) | Rush; Holt Jr. (D) | Albio; Sires (D) |
| 112th (2011–2013) | Rob; Andrews (D) | Frank; LoBiondo (R) | John; Runyan (R) | Chris; Smith (R) | Scott; Garrett (R) | Frank; Pallone (D) | Leonard; Lance (R) | Bill; Pascrell (D) | Steve; Rothman (D) | Donald; Payne; Jr. (D) | Rodney; Frelinghuysen (R) | Rush; Holt Jr. (D) | Albio; Sires (D) |
| 113th (2013–2015) | Rob; Andrews (D) | Frank; LoBiondo (R) | John; Runyan (R) | Chris; Smith (R) | Scott; Garrett (R) | Frank; Pallone (D) | Leonard; Lance (R) | Albio; Sires (D) | Bill; Pascrell (D) | Donald; Payne; Jr. (D) | Rodney; Frelinghuysen (R) | Rush; Holt Jr. (D) | |
| 113th (2013–2015) | Donald; Norcross (D) | Frank; LoBiondo (R) | John; Runyan (R) | Chris; Smith (R) | Scott; Garrett (R) | Frank; Pallone (D) | Leonard; Lance (R) | Albio; Sires (D) | Bill; Pascrell (D) | Donald; Payne; Jr. (D) | Rodney; Frelinghuysen (R) | Rush; Holt Jr. (D) | |
| 114th (2015–2017) | Donald; Norcross (D) | Frank; LoBiondo (R) | Tom; MacArthur (R) | Chris; Smith (R) | Scott; Garrett (R) | Frank; Pallone (D) | Leonard; Lance (R) | Albio; Sires (D) | Bill; Pascrell (D) | Donald; Payne; Jr. (D) | Rodney; Frelinghuysen (R) | Bonnie Watson; Coleman (D) | |
| 115th (2017–2019) | Donald; Norcross (D) | Frank; LoBiondo (R) | Tom; MacArthur (R) | Chris; Smith (R) | Josh; Gottheimer (D) | Frank; Pallone (D) | Leonard; Lance (R) | Albio; Sires (D) | Bill; Pascrell (D) | Donald; Payne; Jr. (D) | Rodney; Frelinghuysen (R) | Bonnie Watson; Coleman (D) | |
| 116th (2019–2021) | Donald; Norcross (D) | Jeff Van; Drew (D) | Andy; Kim (D) | Chris; Smith (R) | Josh; Gottheimer (D) | Frank; Pallone (D) | Tom; Malinowski (D) | Albio; Sires (D) | Bill; Pascrell (D) | Donald; Payne; Jr. (D) | Mikie; Sherrill (D) | Bonnie Watson; Coleman (D) | |
| 116th (2019–2021) | Donald; Norcross (D) | Jeff Van; Drew (R) | Andy; Kim (D) | Chris; Smith (R) | Josh; Gottheimer (D) | Frank; Pallone (D) | Tom; Malinowski (D) | Albio; Sires (D) | Bill; Pascrell (D) | Donald; Payne; Jr. (D) | Mikie; Sherrill (D) | Bonnie Watson; Coleman (D) | |
| 117th (2021–2023) | Donald; Norcross (D) | Jeff Van; Drew (R) | Andy; Kim (D) | Chris; Smith (R) | Josh; Gottheimer (D) | Frank; Pallone (D) | Tom; Malinowski (D) | Albio; Sires (D) | Bill; Pascrell (D) | Donald; Payne; Jr. (D) | Mikie; Sherrill (D) | Bonnie Watson; Coleman (D) | |
| 118th (2023–2025) | Donald; Norcross (D) | Jeff Van; Drew (R) | Andy; Kim (D) | Chris; Smith (R) | Josh; Gottheimer (D) | Frank; Pallone (D) | Thomas; Kean Jr. (R) | Rob; Menendez (D) | Bill; Pascrell (D) | Donald; Payne; Jr. (D) | Mikie; Sherrill (D) | Bonnie Watson; Coleman (D) | |
| 118th (2023–2025) | Donald; Norcross (D) | Jeff Van; Drew (R) | Andy; Kim (D) | Chris; Smith (R) | Josh; Gottheimer (D) | Frank; Pallone (D) | Thomas; Kean Jr. (R) | Rob; Menendez (D) | Bill; Pascrell (D) | LaMonica; McIver (D) | Mikie; Sherrill (D) | Bonnie Watson; Coleman (D) | |
| 119th (2025–2027) | Donald; Norcross (D) | Jeff Van; Drew (R) | Herb; Conaway (D) | Chris; Smith (R) | Josh; Gottheimer (D) | Frank; Pallone (D) | Thomas; Kean Jr. (R) | Rob; Menendez (D) | Nellie; Pou (D) | LaMonica; McIver (D) | Mikie; Sherrill (D) | Bonnie Watson; Coleman (D) | |
| 119th (2025–2027) | Donald; Norcross (D) | Jeff Van; Drew (R) | Herb; Conaway (D) | Chris; Smith (R) | Josh; Gottheimer (D) | Frank; Pallone (D) | Thomas; Kean Jr. (R) | Rob; Menendez (D) | Nellie; Pou (D) | LaMonica; McIver (D) | Analilia; Mejia (D) | Bonnie Watson; Coleman (D) | |
| 120th (2027–2029) | Donald; Norcross (D) | Zack; Mullock (D) | Herb; Conaway (D) | Chris; Smith (R) | Josh; Gottheimer (D) | Frank; Pallone (D) | Rebecca; Bennett (D) | Rob; Menendez (D) | Nellie; Pou (D) | LaMonica; McIver (D) | Analilia; Mejia (D) | Adam; Hamawy (D) | |
| Congress | 1st | 2nd | 3rd | 4th | 5th | 6th | 7th | 8th | 9th | 10th | 11th | 12th | 13th |
| Congress | District | | | | | | | | | | | | |

== Key ==
Democratic (D)
Democratic-Republican (DR)
Federalist (F)
Pro-Administration (PA)
Jacksonian (J)
National Republican (NR)
Opposition Northern (O)
Republican (R)
Whig (W)

== See also ==
- List of United States congressional districts
- New Jersey's congressional districts
- Political party strength in New Jersey
