= Fairmount Cemetery (Newark, New Jersey) =

Cemetery

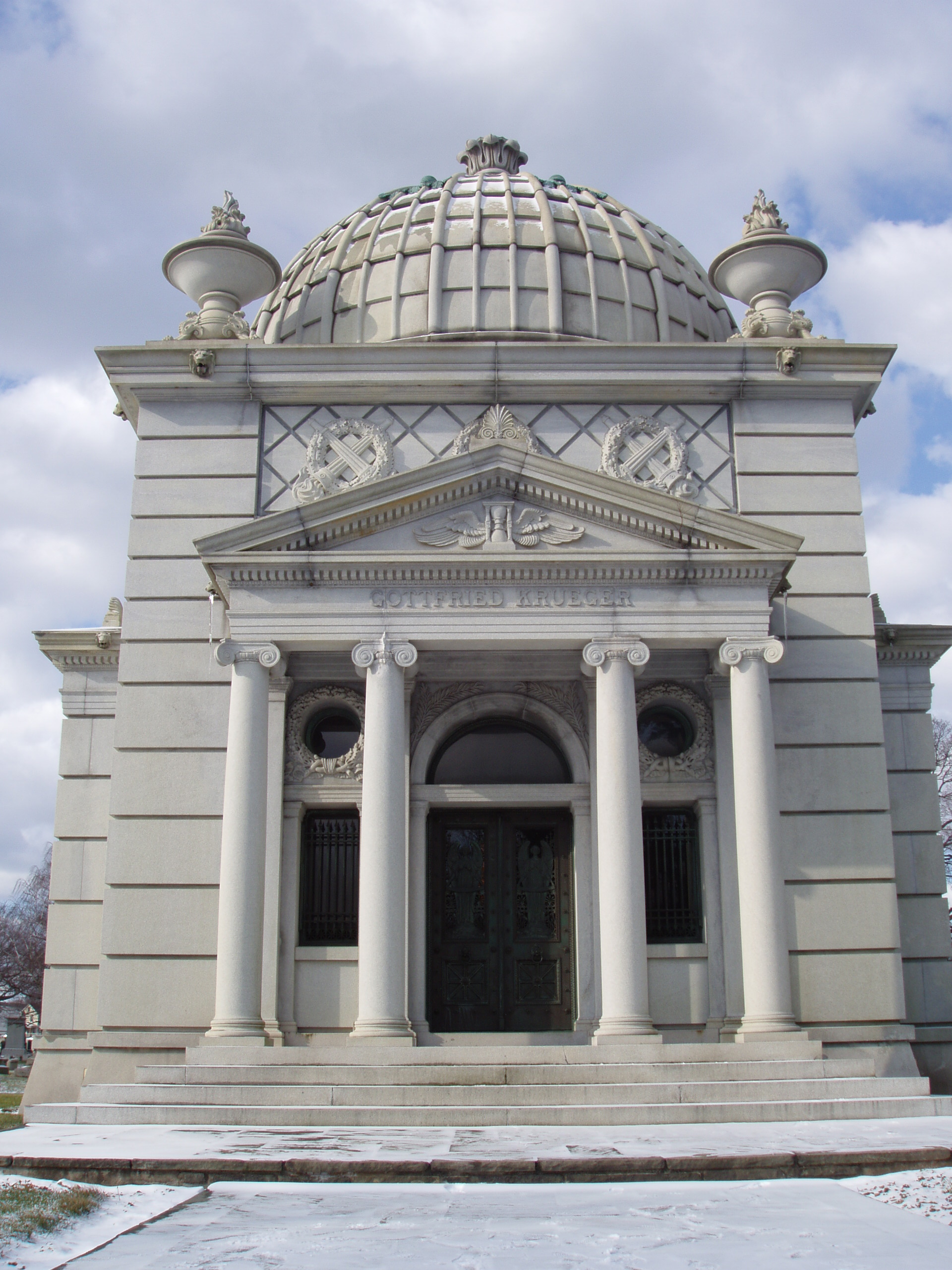
- Krueger Mausoleum

Details
- Established: 1855
- Location: Newark, New Jersey
- Country: United States
- Coordinates: 40.7464°N 74.2031°W
- Type: Non denominational
- Size: 150-acre (0.61 km^{2})
- No. of graves: 150,000
- Website: www.fairmountcemetery.com
- Find a Grave: Fairmount Cemetery
- The Political Graveyard: Fairmount Cemetery

Fairmount Cemetery is a 150-acre (0.61 km^{2}) rural cemetery in the West Ward of Newark, New Jersey, in the neighborhood of Fairmount. It opened in 1855, shortly after the Newark City Council banned burials in the central city due to fears that bodies spread yellow fever. The first burial in Fairmount Cemetery was a 24-year-old man named Lewis J. Pierson. Fairmount is still accepting interments.

Along with Mount Pleasant Cemetery, Fairmount has the graves of Newark's most eminent turn of the century citizens, including Clara Maass, who gave her life in the investigation of yellow fever. A high proportion of the graves belong to German families. Fairmount Cemetery includes large trees, rolling hills, and intricately carved monuments. Featured near the old South Orange Avenue entrance is the recently restored zinc Settlers' Monument, commemorating the founders of Newark. There is also a Civil War memorial. The modern entrance to Fairmount Cemetery is on Central Avenue.

== Notable burials ==
- Harriet Adams (1893–1982), pseudonymous author of many books in the Nancy Drew series and a few in the Hardy Boys series
- Leila Bennett (1892–1965), actress
- Peter Angelo Cavicchia (1879–1967)
- Henry Meade Doremus (1851–1921), Mayor of Newark from 1903 to 1907
- Thomas Dunn English (1819–1902), represented New Jersey's 6th congressional district from 1891 to 1895
- Christian William Feigenspan (1836–1939), president of Newark's Feigenspan Brewing Company
- James Fairman Fielder (1867–1954), Governor of New Jersey from 1913 to 1917
- William Henry Frederick Fiedler (1847–1919), represented New Jersey's 6th congressional district from 1883 to 1885
- Gwen Guthrie (1950–1999), singer-songwriter
- Fred A. Hartley Jr. (1902–1969)
- Georgiana Klingle Holmes (1841–1940), wrote poetry under the name George Klingle
- Henry Lang (1828–1897), Mayor of Newark from 1882 to 1883
- Frederick Lehlbach (1876–1937)
- Herman Lehlbach (1845–1904), represented New Jersey's 6th congressional district from 1885 to 1889
- Clara Maass (1876–1901), nurse who died as a result of volunteering for medical experiments to study yellow fever
- Le Gage Pratt (1852–1911)
- Needham Roberts (1901–1949), African-American World War I veteran who was decorated for bravery
