= Henry Lang =

Henry Lang may refer to:

- Henry Lang (public servant) (1919–1997), New Zealand public servant, economist and university professor
- Henry Lang (politician) (1828–1896), American politician, mayor of Newark

== See also ==
- Henry Lange (1821–1893), German cartographer
