= Nehemiah Perry =

Nehemiah Perry may refer to:

- Nehemiah Perry (cricketer)
- Nehemiah Perry (politician)
