= Henry J. Yates =

American politician (1819-1893)

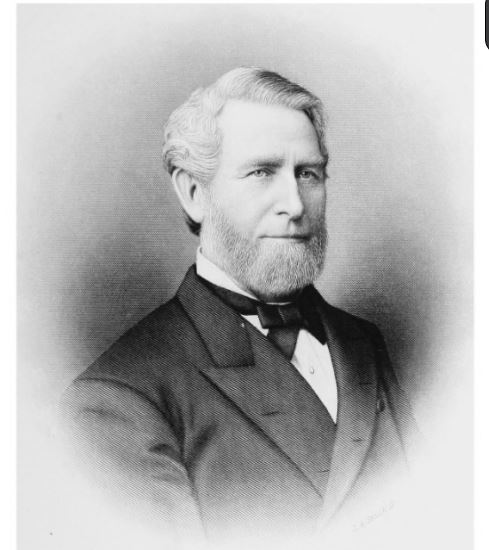
- Mayor Henry J. Yates

17th Mayor of Newark
- In office 1876–1880
- Preceded by: Nehemiah Perry
- Succeeded by: William H. F. Fiedler

Personal details
- Born: December 7, 1819; New York City, New York
- Died: November 24, 1893 (aged 73); Newark, New Jersey
- Political party: Republican

Henry J. Yates (December 7, 1819 – November 24, 1893) was an American politician who served as the Mayor of Newark from 1876 to 1880.

Yates was the son of manufacturer Thomas Yates. He was born in New York and at age 15 began work in Newark for William Rankin & Co. At age 24, he founded a hat company Vail & Yates which lasted until 1857. Later he was part of Yates, Wharton, & Co. also making hats.

In 1874–1875, he represented the Fourth Ward and in 1876 became Mayor.
