= Georgiana Klingle Holmes =

American poet and painter

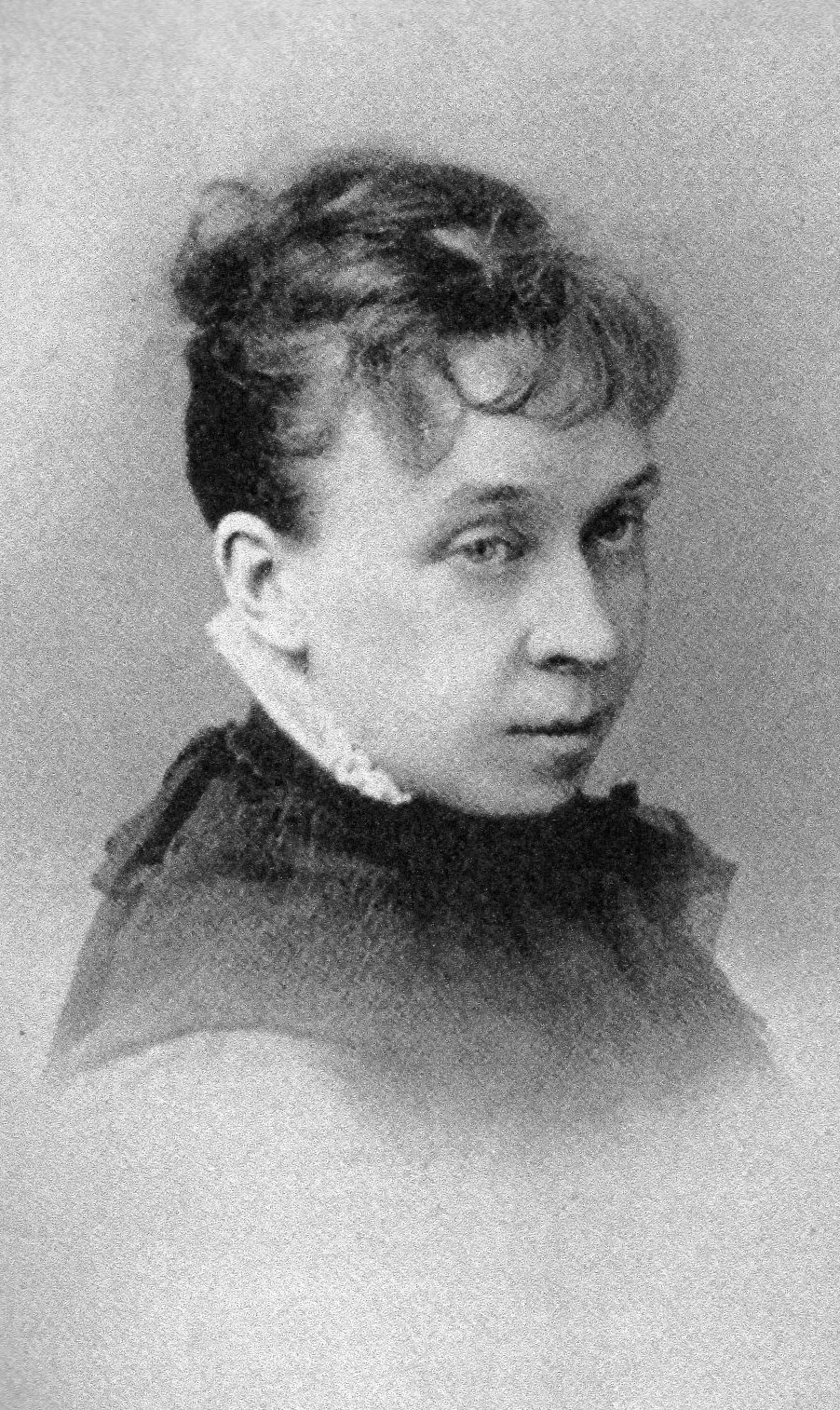
Georgiana Klingle Holmes

Georgiana Klingle Holmes (November 4, 1841 - April 22, 1940) was an American poet and painter. She founded the Arthur's Home For Destitute Boys and the LaRue Holmes Nature Lovers' League, both in memory of her sons, who died young.

== Early life ==
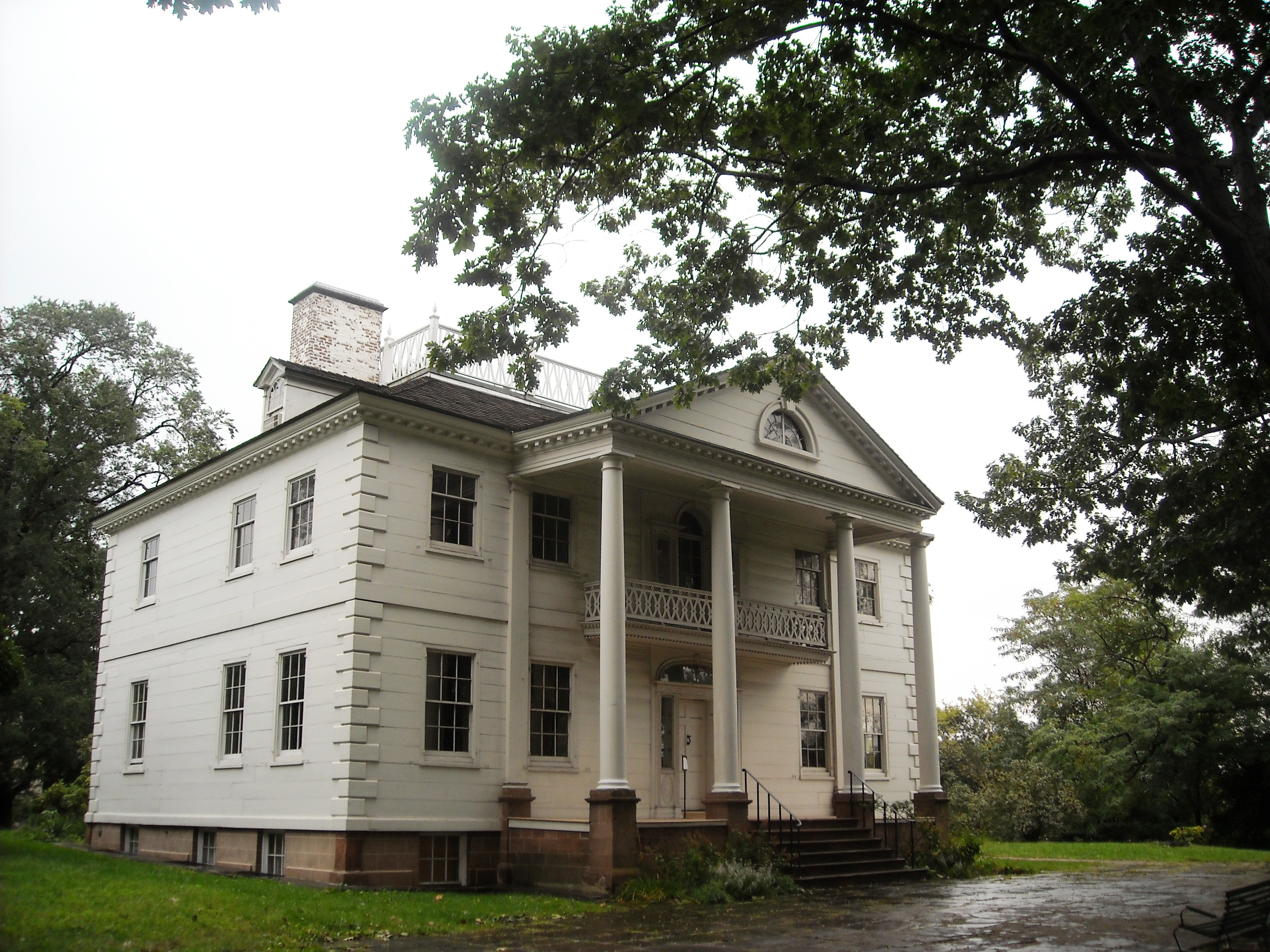
Morris-Jumel Mansion

Georgiana Klingle was born on November 4, 1841, in Philadelphia, Pennsylvania. She was the daughter of George Franklin Klingle (1796-1840), M.D. and Mary Hunt Morris (1812-1897). Mary Hunt Morris was the daughter of William H. Morris and Catherine Tiers of New York City. She descended from Lewis Morris, of Morrisania, Pennsylvania, a signer of the Declaration of Independence. Once widow, Mary Hunt Morris Klingle married John Haas, of Philadelphia, who raised Georgiana Klingle as his daughter. Georgiana Klingle father's ancestry is found in Upper Saxony. Hans George Klingle, her great-grandfather, arrived in the United States in the ship "Restoration" with his son, on October 9, 1747, and settled in Pennsylvania. At the breaking out of the Revolutionary War her grandfather, George, resided in Chestnut Hill. Dr. Klingle was a man of literary and scientific reputation.

She was educated in Philadelphia.

== Career ==
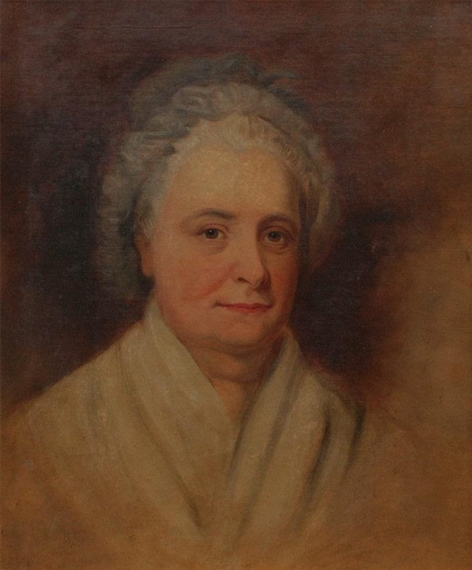
Georgiana Klingle Holmes, Portrait of Martha Washington after Gilbert Stuart, 1887

From early childhood, Georgiana Klingle Holmes contributed to periodicals of the different cities. Her taste ran in a groove not often entered by young authors, children's stories with a moral to leave an impression. She was an artist of merit, but writing was the passion of her life. Two portraits, Portrait of Martha Washington after Gilbert Stuart (1887) and Portrait of Mrs. Laura Klingle (née Tiernan) (circa 1875) were sold to auction in 2012–2013.

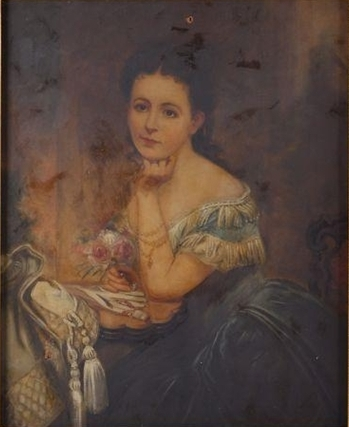
Georgiana Klingle Holmes, Portrait of Mrs. Laura Klingle, circa 1875

She wrote poetry using the pen-name "George Klingle", which touched many hearts. Her collection of poems entitled "Make Thy Way Mine" (New York, 1876) was made after repeated letters from interested strangers in different parts of the country. That collection was followed by "In the Name of the King" (New York, 1888).

Being interested in philanthropic work, she founded Arthur's Home For Destitute Boys, in Summit, New Jersey, (later The Blind Babies Home) in memory of her son, who died at the age of nine years after being bitten by a rabid dog. It closed in 1927. At the death of her second son, LaRue, she founded the LaRue Holmes Nature Lovers' League, for which she was active in various schools, travelling by horse and buggy between 1915 and 1925 to give talks on nature.

== Works ==
- Recompense: with twenty illustrations from celebrated paintings by the great masters (1901)
- Make thy way mine, and other poems (1886)
- The sail which hath passed, and other poems (1913)
- In the name of the King (1888)
- A page of dreams (1914)
- Perdita (1894)
- When they shall lead us home, and other poems (1926)
- Lift up thy cross (1936)

== Personal life ==
On January 13, 1870, Georgiana Klingle married Benjamin Proctor Holmes (1844-1922), of New York City, a veteran of the Civil War, son of Adrian Banker Holmes and Catherine Morris, and therefore second cousin of Georgiana Klingle. They had two sons, Arthur (1872-1881) and La Rue (1883-1906), both died young. La Rue Holmes, despite young in age, was a curator at the American Museum of Natural History in New York City and correspondent for the Smithsonian Institution in Washington, D.C. He died at 22 years old.

She died on April 22, 1940, and was buried at Fair Mount Cemetery, Chatham, New Jersey.
