= Herman Lehlbach =

American politician (1845–1904)

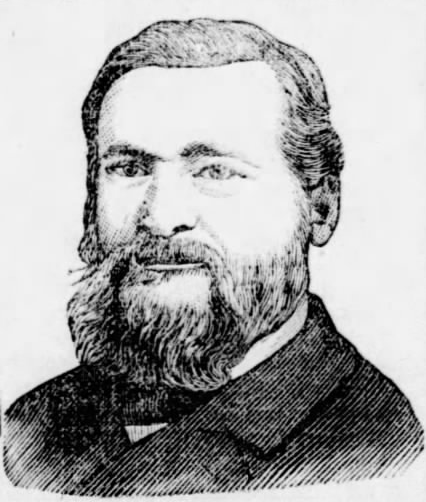
- St. Joseph Herald (St. Joseph, Missouri), January 2, 1890.

Sheriff of Essex County, New Jersey
- In office 1893–1896
- Succeeded by: Henry Meade Doremus

Member of the U.S. House of Representatives from New Jersey's 6th district
- In office March 4, 1885 – March 3, 1891
- Preceded by: William H. F. Fiedler
- Succeeded by: Thomas Dunn English

Member of the New Jersey General Assembly from Essex County
- In office 1884–1886

Personal details
- Born: July 3, 1845 Heiligkreuzsteinach, Grand Duchy of Baden, German Confederation
- Died: January 11, 1904 (aged 58) Newark, New Jersey, U.S.
- Resting place: Fairmount Cemetery
- Party: Republican
- Relations: Frederick R. Lehlbach (nephew)

Herman Lehlbach (July 3, 1845 – January 11, 1904) was an American Republican Party politician who represented New Jersey's 6th congressional district in the United States House of Representatives for three terms from 1885 to 1891.

He was the uncle of Frederick R. Lehlbach, who also represented Newark, New Jersey, in Congress from 1915 to 1937.

== Early life ==
Lehlbach was born in Heiligkreuzsteinach in the Grand Duchy of Baden, then a state of the German Confederation. He immigrated to the United States in 1851 with his parents, who settled in Newark, New Jersey. He attended public school.

== Career ==
Lehlbach became a civil engineer, and was a sheriff of Essex County, New Jersey, for three years. He served as member of the New Jersey General Assembly from 1884 to 1886.

Lehlbach was elected as a Republican to the Forty-ninth, Fiftieth, and Fifty-first Congresses, serving in office from March 4, 1885, to March 3, 1891, but was not a candidate for renomination in 1890.

In 1890-91 he served on a congressional committee investigating Federal immigration laws, which focused primarily on the Chinese population. He and other members of the committee traveled across the country from Washington by train on a six week fact-finding trip, during a period of intense anti-Chinese sentiment, following up on the Chinese Exclusion Act of 1882. Lehlbach was the primary author of the report that ensued, released on March 2, 1891, which stated that the Chinese population was decreasing but "not as rapidly as...is desirable". The report recommended that more resources be given to enforcement, and that because "the Chinaman never assimilates with our people and knows nothing of the institutions of this country," "the universal sentiment of all testimony taken...is that the Chinese should be excluded." The 1882 Exclusion Act was subsequently renewed and strengthened with the Geary Act of 1892.

In 1891, he ran unsuccessfully for mayor of Newark, New Jersey, against Joseph Haynes. Lehlbach petitioned for a recount, but was denied.

== Later career and death ==
After leaving Congress, he resumed the practice of his profession as a civil engineer in Newark, and was Sheriff of Essex County, New Jersey, from 1893 to 1896.

He died in Newark, on January 11, 1904, due to kidney problems. He was interred in Fairmount Cemetery in Newark.

U.S. House of Representatives
Preceded by William H.F. Fiedler	Member of the U.S. House of Representatives from New Jersey's 6th congressional district March 4, 1885 – March 3, 1891	Succeeded by Thomas Dunn English
