= Frederick R. Lehlbach =

American politician (1876–1937)

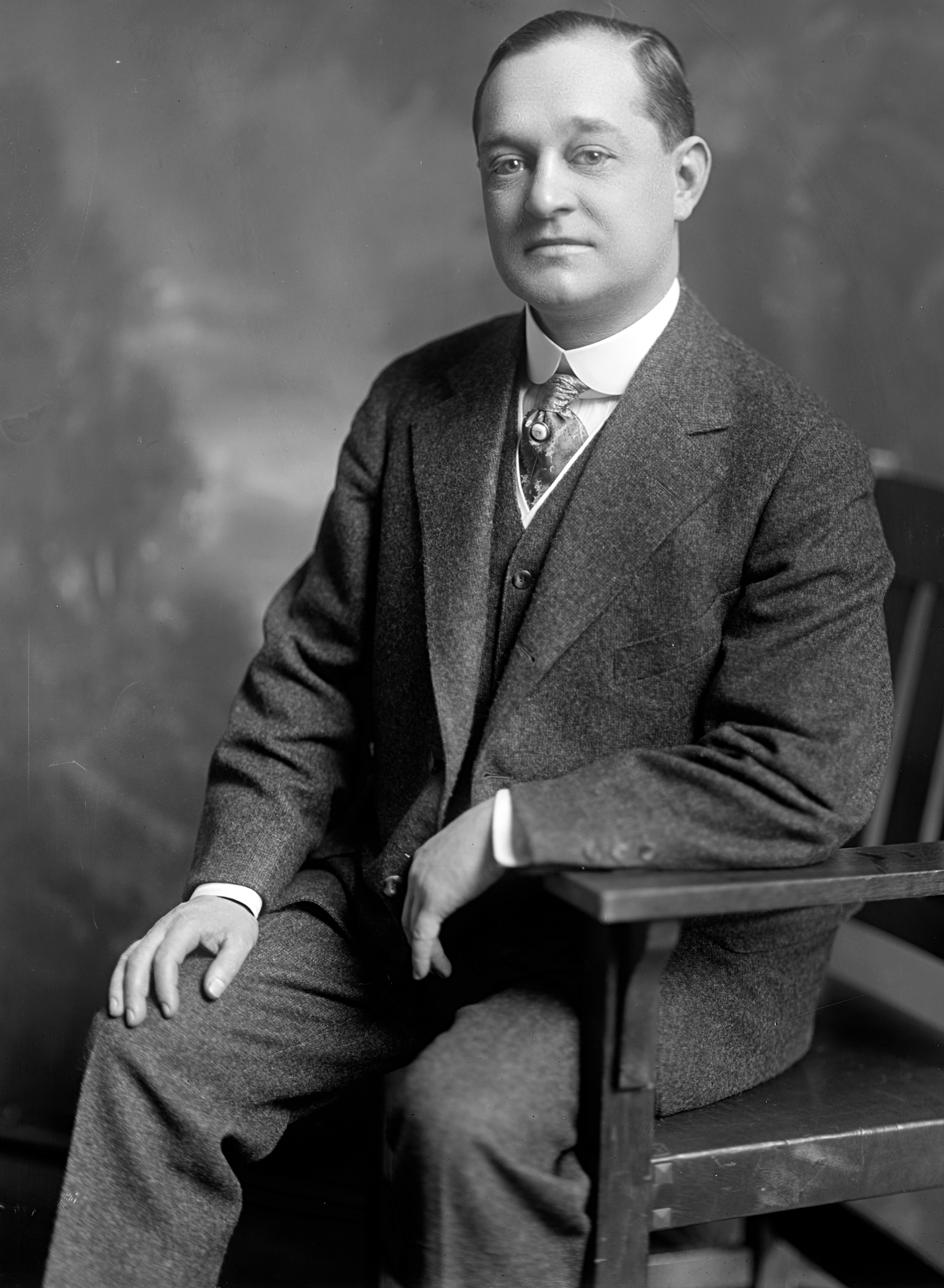

21st Chairman of House Republican Conference
- In office 1935–1937
- Speaker: Jo Byrns
- William B. Bankhead
- Preceded by: Robert Luce
- Succeeded by: Roy Woodruff

Member of the U.S. House of Representatives from New Jersey
- In office March 4, 1915 – January 3, 1937
- Preceded by: Edward W. Townsend
- Succeeded by: Frank W. Towey Jr.
- Constituency: 10th district (1915–1933); 12th district (1933–1937)
House positions
Ranking Member of the House Committee on Merchant Marine and Fisheries
In office 1935 – January 3, 1937
Succeeded by	Richard J. Welch
Ranking Member of the House Committee on Merchant Marine, Radio and Fisheries
In office 1933–1935
Ranking Member of the House Committee on the Civil Service
In office 1933 – January 3, 1937
Preceded by	Lamar Jeffers
Chair of the House Committee on Civil Service
In office 1923–1933
Succeeded by	Lamar Jeffers
Chair of the House Committee on Reform in the Civil Service
In office 1919–1923
Preceded by	Hannibal L. Godwin
Ranking Member of the House Committee on Reform in the Civil Service
In office 1917–1919

Member of the New Jersey General Assembly from Essex County
- In office 1903–1905

Member of the Newark Board of Education
- In office 1900–1903

Personal details
- Born: January 31, 1876 New York City, US
- Died: August 4, 1937 (aged 61) Washington, D.C., US
- Resting place: Fairmount Cemetery, Newark
- Party: Republican
- Relations: Herman Lehlbach (uncle)
- Education: Yale University; New York Law School

Frederick Reimold Lehlbach (January 31, 1876 – August 4, 1937) was an American lawyer and politician. As a Republican, Lehlbach served as the U.S. representative for New Jersey's 10th congressional district from 1915 to 1933 and as the representative from New Jersey's 12th congressional district from 1933 to 1937. Lehlbach was also the nephew of Herman Lehlbach, a former U.S. Representative from New Jersey's 6th congressional district who served from 1885 to 1891.

== Biography ==
Lehlbach was born in New York City on January 31, 1876, and lived there until he was eight years old. At that point, he moved with his parents to Newark, New Jersey. He graduated from Yale University in Connecticut in 1897, and then went on to attend New York Law School. He was admitted to the bar in February 1899 and he started his law practice in Newark, obtaining his first legal experience in the office of Pitney & Hardin there. He served on the city's Board of Education from 1900 to 1903, and then served in the State House of Assembly until 1905. Lehlbach then served as the clerk of the state board of equalization of taxes from April 3, 1905, until his resignation on April 14, 1908, when he was appointed to the position of assistant prosecutor of Essex County. Lehlbach continued to serve as the assistant prosecutor until April 6, 1913, when he resigned in order to restart the practice of law.

== Politics ==
Lehlbach ran as a candidate from the Republican Party in the 1914 United States House election. He defeated the incumbent Democrat Edward W. Townsend, capturing 47.5% of the vote, in contrast to Townsend's 42.4%. After soundly defeating his opponent in the 1916 House election, he faced a tough election in 1918. He did manage to win the election with a slim 2.2% majority, in a close race with Democrat Dallas Flannagan.

In the 66th United States Congress through 68th United States Congress, Lehlbach served as the chairman of the Committee on Reform in the Civil Service. In 1924, Lehlbach was a delegate at the Republican National Convention. He later served as chairman for the Committee on Civil Service in the 69th United States Congress through 71st United States Congress. After serving 18 years as the representative of the 10th district, Lehlbach was moved to New Jersey's 12th congressional district. In the 1936 House election, Lehlbach was up for re-election against Democrat Frank W. Towey, Jr. In a heated battle, Lehlbach lost his election bid by capturing 49.6% of the vote in comparison to Towey's 49.9%.

After losing the election, Lehlbach went back to practicing law in Washington, D.C., and continued to do so until his death by heart attack at the age of 61 on August 4, 1937. He was later buried in Fairmount Cemetery in Newark.

U.S. House of Representatives
Preceded by Edward W. Townsend	Member of the U.S. House of Representatives from New Jersey's 10th congressional district 1915 – 1933	Succeeded by Fred A. Hartley Jr.
Preceded by Mary Teresa Norton	Member of the U.S. House of Representatives from New Jersey's 12th congressional district 1933 – 1937	Succeeded by Frank W. Towey Jr.
