= Edward W. Townsend =

American politician (1855–1942)

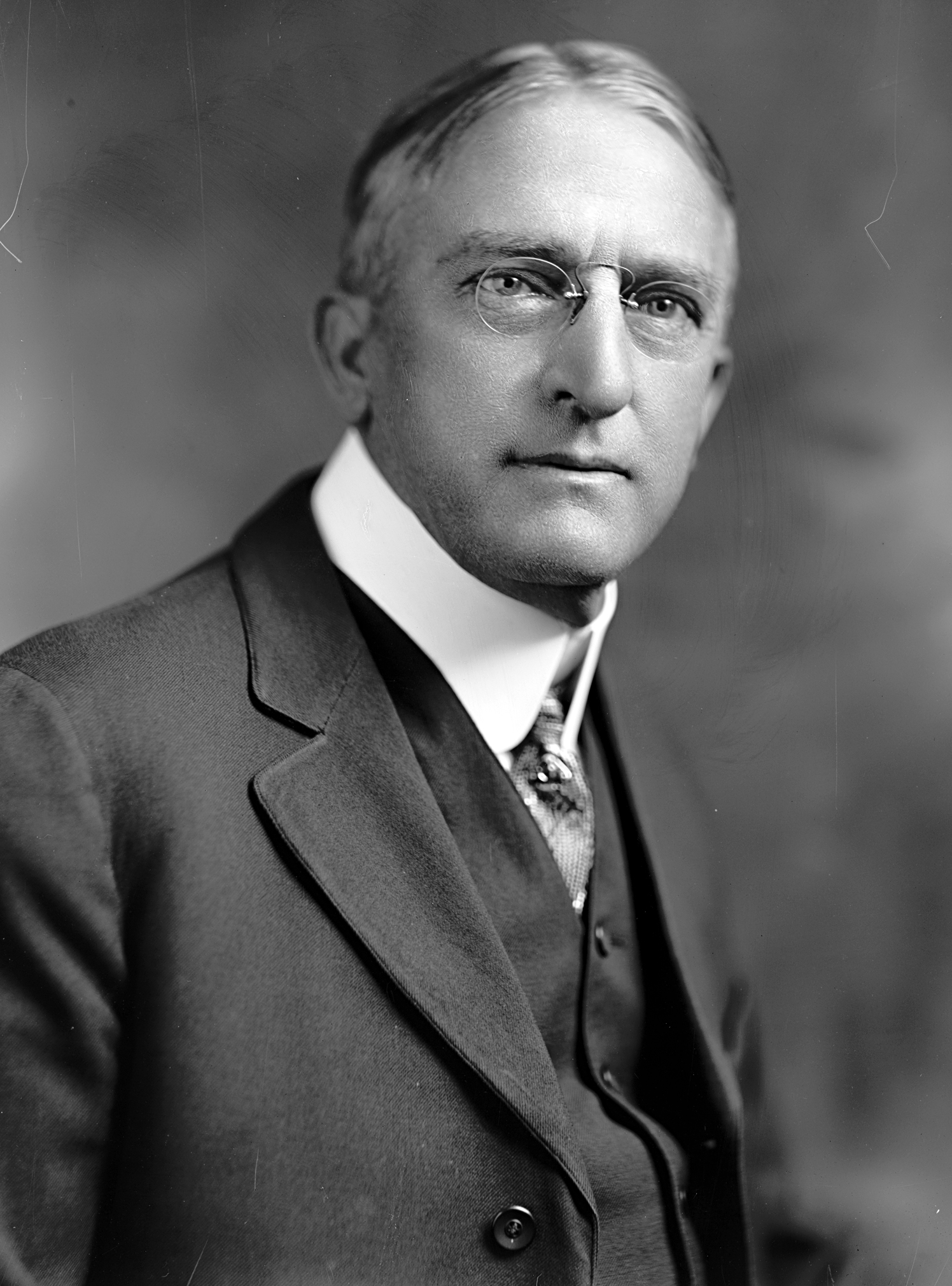

Member of the U.S. House of Representatives from New Jersey
- In office March 4, 1911 – March 3, 1915
- Preceded by: Richard W. Parker
- Succeeded by: Frederick R. Lehlbach
- Constituency: 7th district (1911–1913); 10th district (1913–1915)

Personal details
- Born: February 10, 1855 Cleveland, Ohio, U.S.
- Died: March 15, 1942 (aged 87) New York City, U.S.
- Resting place: Forest Hill Cemetery; Utica, New York, U.S.
- Party: Democratic
- Spouse: Annie Lake (m. 1884)

Edward Waterman Townsend (February 10, 1855 – March 15, 1942) was an American Democratic Party politician who represented New Jersey's 7th congressional district in the United States House of Representatives from 1911 to 1913, and the 10th district from 1913 to 1915, after redistricting following the United States Census, 1910.

== Biography ==
Townsend was born in Cleveland, Ohio, on February 10, 1855; his father was Horace Gilbert Townsend. He attended private and public schools in that city. He went to San Francisco, California, in 1875 and engaged in newspaper and literary work. He married Annie Lake on April 16, 1884.

He moved to New York City in 1893 and continued his reportorial and literary pursuits. In 1900, he became a resident of Montclair, New Jersey.

He was an author of novels, plays, short stories, as well as a textbook on the United States Constitution. His most popular fictional writings were his "Chimmie Fadden" Bowery boy stories.

=== United States House of Representatives ===
Townsend was elected as a Democrat to the Sixty-second and Sixty-third Congresses, serving in office from March 4, 1911, to March 3, 1915, but was an unsuccessful candidate for reelection in 1914 to the Sixty-fourth Congress.

After leaving Congress, he served as postmaster of Montclair from 1915 to 1923. Townsend moved to New York City in 1924 and resumed newspaper and literary pursuits, and was a member of the National Institute of Arts and Letters.

=== Death ===
He died in New York City on March 15, 1942, and was interred in Forest Hill Cemetery in Utica, New York.

U.S. House of Representatives
Preceded by Richard W. Parker	Member of the U.S. House of Representatives from New Jersey's 7th congressional district March 4, 1911 – March 3, 1913	Succeeded by Robert G. Bremner
Preceded by James A. Hamill	Member of the U.S. House of Representatives from New Jersey's 10th congressional district March 4, 1913 – March 3, 1915	Succeeded by Frederick R. Lehlbach
