= Joseph E. Haynes =

American politician

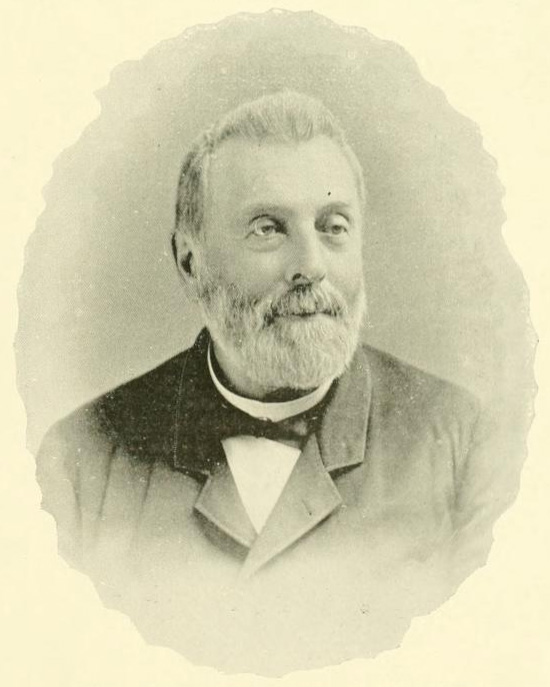
- Born: Joseph Emmett Haynes; July 31, 1827; Westford, New York
- Died: December 6, 1897 (aged 70); Essex County, New Jersey
- Monuments: The Pequannock Gate
- Occupation: School principal
- Title: Mayor of Newark, New Jersey
- Term: 1884-1894
- Predecessor: Henry Lang (politician)
- Successor: Julius A. Lebkuecher
- Political party: Democratic Party

Joseph Emmett Haynes (July 31, 1827 – December 6, 1897) was the 20th mayor of Newark, New Jersey from 1884 to 1894. A Democrat who explicitly appealed to the working class, Haynes is chiefly remembered for securing Newark a safe and abundant water supply, and his mayoralty is seen as a turning point in the prosperity of Newark.

== Biography ==
Haynes began a $6 million project to obtain water from the Pequannock River instead of the polluted Passaic River, which resulted in a 70% decline in typhoid deaths.

Haynes held a Semi-Centennial Celebration for Newark on 5 January 1886, and its success led to him being called the "Semi-Centennial Mayor". However, local newspapers criticised Haynes' use of patronage, calling the Board of Health the "Board of Junket" and dubbing him "Picnic Joe" for his use of hospitalities. He faced accusations of accepting gifts in exchange for contracts and ballot rigging.

Before he was elected mayor Haynes was principal of Morton Street School. He left office in 1894 to become postmaster of Newark. The Pequannock Gate, also known as the North Newark Castle, is a memorial to him.

He is interred in Clinton Cemetery in Irvington.
