= William H. F. Fiedler =

American politician (1847–1919)

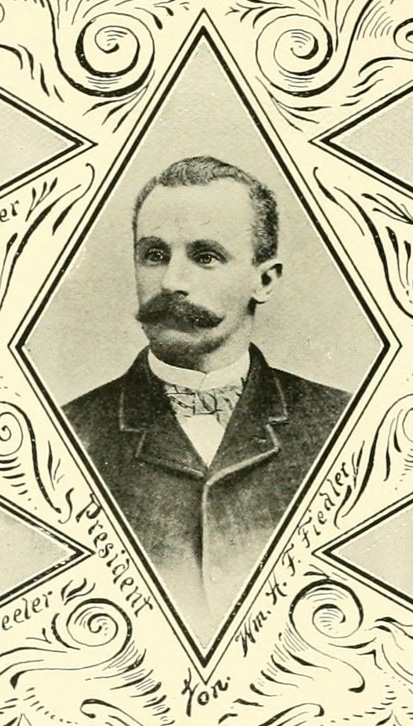

Member of the U.S. House of Representatives from New Jersey's 6th district
- In office March 4, 1883 – March 3, 1885
- Preceded by: Phineas Jones
- Succeeded by: Herman Lehlbach

18th Mayor of Newark
- In office 1880–1882
- Preceded by: Henry J. Yates
- Succeeded by: Henry Lang

Personal details
- Born: William Henry Frederick Fielder; August 25, 1847 New York City, New York
- Died: January 1, 1919 (aged 71) Newark, New Jersey
- Resting place: Fairmount Cemetery
- Party: Democratic

William Henry Frederick Fiedler (August 25, 1847 – January 1, 1919) was an American Democratic Party politician who represented New Jersey's 6th congressional district in the United States House of Representatives for one term from 1883 to 1885.

== Biography ==
Fiedler was born in New York City on August 25, 1847. He moved to New Jersey with his parents, who settled in Newark. He attended the public and high schools, and apprenticed to the hat-finishing trade at the age of fifteen.

== Career ==
He was employed as a clerk and engaged in the retail hat and later in the men's clothing business.

=== Politics ===
He was elected an alderman of Newark in 1876 and 1878, and was a member of the New Jersey General Assembly in 1878 and 1879. He served as mayor of Newark from 1880 to 1882, and was an unsuccessful candidate for reelection in 1881. He served again as a member of the General Assembly in 1882.

=== Congress ===
He was elected as a Democrat to the Forty-eighth Congress, serving in office from March 4, 1883 – March 3, 1885, but was an unsuccessful candidate for reelection.

== Later career ==
After leaving Congress, he was appointed postmaster of Newark on March 29, 1886, and served until October 1, 1889. He resumed his former business pursuits until 1905, when he engaged in the real estate business and in banking.

He was an unsuccessful candidate for mayor in 1904.

== Death and burial ==
He died in Newark on January 1, 1919, and was interred in Fairmount Cemetery in Newark.

U.S. House of Representatives
Preceded by Phineas Jones	Member of the U.S. House of Representatives from New Jersey's 6th congressional district March 4, 1883 – March 3, 1885	Succeeded by Herman Lehlbach
Political offices
Preceded by Henry J. Yates	Mayor of Newark, New Jersey; 1880–1882	Succeeded by Henry Lang
