= Phineas Jones =

American businessman and politician

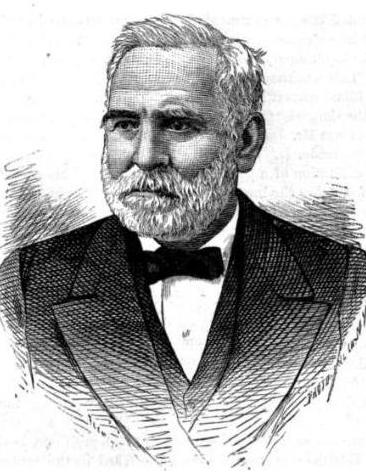

Member of the U.S. House of Representatives from New Jersey's 6th district
- In office March 4, 1881 – March 3, 1883
- Preceded by: John L. Blake
- Succeeded by: William H. F. Fiedler

Personal details
- Born: Phineas Jones; April 18, 1819 Spencer, Massachusetts
- Died: April 19, 1884 (aged 65) Newark, New Jersey
- Resting place: Evergreen Cemetery in Hillside, New Jersey
- Party: Republican

Phineas Jones (April 18, 1819 – April 19, 1884) was an American businessman and Republican politician who represented New Jersey's 6th congressional district in the United States House of Representatives for one term from 1881 to 1883.

== Early life and family ==
Jones was born in Spencer, Massachusetts, on April 18, 1819, to Phineas Jones, a soldier in the American Revolutionary War, and Hannah Phillips, a descendant of Rev. George Phillips who settled Watertown, Massachusetts, in 1630.

== Early career ==
He attended the common schools in Spencer and moved to Elizabeth, New Jersey (then called Elizabethtown) in 1855, where he was a member of the city council of Elizabeth from 1856 to 1860. He moved to Newark in 1860 and engaged in manufacturing and mercantile pursuits.

He was vice president of the New Jersey State Agricultural Society, and served as a member of the New Jersey General Assembly in 1873 and 1874.

== Congress ==
Jones was elected as a Republican to the Forty-seventh Congress, serving in office from March 4, 1881 - March 3, 1883, but declined to be a candidate for renomination in 1882.

== Later life ==
After leaving Congress, Jones retired from active life and died in Newark on April 19, 1884, the day after his 65th birthday. He was interred in Evergreen Cemetery in Hillside, New Jersey.

U.S. House of Representatives
Preceded by John L. Blake	Member of the U.S. House of Representatives from New Jersey's 6th congressional district March 4, 1881 – March 3, 1883	Succeeded by William H.F. Fiedler
