= John L. Blake =

American politician (1831–1899)

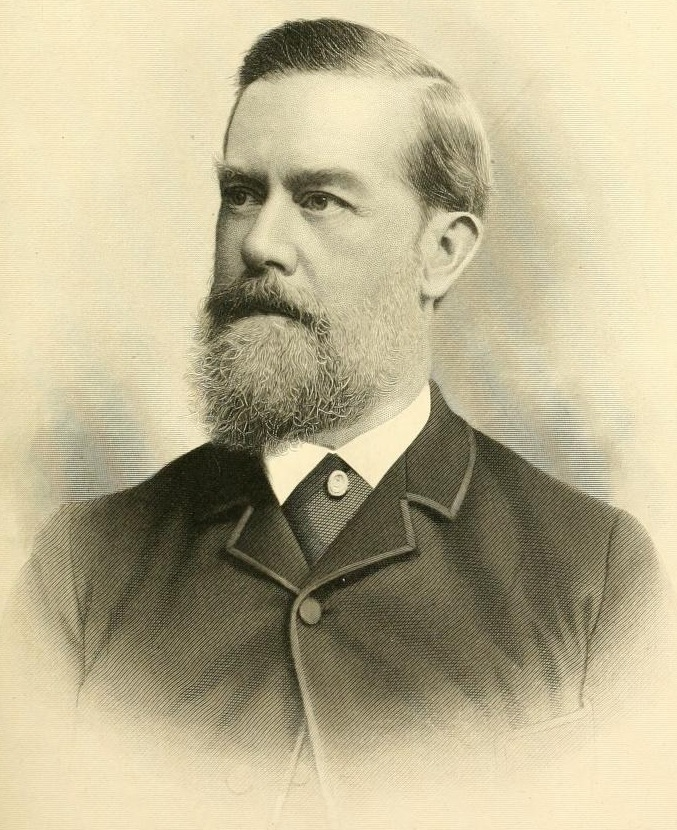
- From Volume IV of 1922's History of the Oranges to 1921.

Member of the U.S. House of Representatives from New Jersey's 6th district
- In office March 4, 1879 – March 3, 1881
- Preceded by: Thomas Baldwin Peddie
- Succeeded by: Phineas Jones

Personal details
- Born: John Lauris Blake; March 25, 1831 Boston, Massachusetts, U.S.
- Died: October 10, 1899 (aged 68) West Orange, New Jersey, U.S.
- Resting place: Rosedale Cemetery
- Party: Republican

John Lauris Blake (March 25, 1831, in Boston, Massachusetts – October 10, 1899, in West Orange, New Jersey) was an American lawyer and Republican Party politician who represented New Jersey's 6th congressional district in the United States House of Representatives for one term from 1879 to 1881.

== Early life and education ==
Blake was born in Boston, Massachusetts, on March 25, 1831. He received a classical education and moved to Orange, in 1846. He studied law, was admitted to the bar in 1852 and commenced practice in Orange.

=== New Jersey legislature ===
He was a member of the New Jersey General Assembly in 1857 and was a delegate to the 1876 Republican National Convention.

== Congress ==
Blake was elected as a Republican to the Forty-sixth Congress, serving in office from March 4, 1879, to March 3, 1881, but declined to be a candidate for renomination in 1880.

=== After Congress ===
After leaving Congress, he resumed his law practice in Orange, and became president of the Citizens' Gas Light Co. of Newark, in 1893.

== Death ==
He died in West Orange, on October 10, 1899, and was interred in Rosedale Cemetery in Orange.

U.S. House of Representatives
| Preceded by Thomas Baldwin Peddie | Member of the U.S. House of Representatives from New Jersey's 6th congressional district March 4, 1879 – March 3, 1881 | Succeeded by Phineas Jones |
