= Frank William Towey Jr. =

American lawyer and politician (1895–1979)

Frank W. Towey Jr.
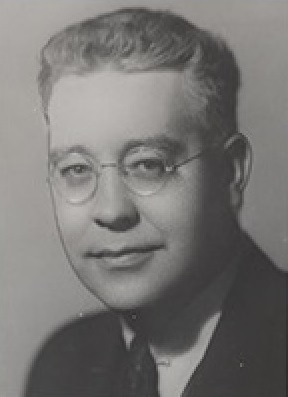

Member of the U.S. House of Representatives from New Jersey's 12th district
- In office January 3, 1937 – January 3, 1939
- Preceded by: Frederick R. Lehlbach
- Succeeded by: Robert Kean

Personal details
- Born: November 5, 1895 Jersey City, New Jersey, U.S.
- Died: September 4, 1979 (aged 83) Montclair, New Jersey, U.S.
- Party: Democratic
- Education: College of the Holy Cross (BA); Fordham University (LLB)

Frank William Towey Jr. (November 5, 1895 – September 4, 1979) was an American lawyer and politician. As a member of the Democratic Party, he served as the United States representative from New Jersey's 12th congressional district for one term from 1937 to 1939.

== Background ==
Towey was born and raised in Jersey City, New Jersey. After attending Manresa Hall Grammar School and St. Peter's Preparatory School, Towey went on to the College of the Holy Cross in Worcester, Massachusetts, graduating in 1916. Towey then attended the Fordham University School of Law, graduating in 1919. He was commissioned as an infantry second lieutenant in the United States Army in September 1918, and he served until he was honorably discharged in January 1919. He was admitted to the bar in 1920 and started his law practice in Newark, New Jersey.

== Politics ==
In 1936, the Democrat Towey decided to run for the House of Representatives seat for New Jersey's 12th congressional district. He was set to face eleven-term incumbent Republican Frederick R. Lehlbach. In a very close election, Towey beat the incumbent Lehlbach, capturing 54,688 votes in comparison to his 54,363, giving Towey a 49.9%–49.6% victory. Towey would only serve one term in the House of Representatives. In the 1938 House elections, Towey faced Republican challenger Robert W. Kean, a member of the New Jersey Kean political family. Towey lost to Kean by a nearly 14% margin.

Towey resumed his law practice in Newark. From 1940 to 1947, he served as a member of the state's Selective Appeal Board. In 1943, he became assistant to the United States Attorney General, remaining in this position until 1955.

== Death ==
Towey died in Montclair, New Jersey, on September 4, 1979, at the age of 83. His ashes were interred in Acacia Memorial Park, near Seattle, Washington.

U.S. House of Representatives
Preceded by Frederick R. Lehlbach	Member of the U.S. House of Representatives from New Jersey's 12th congressional district 1937–1939	Succeeded by Robert Kean
