= Thomas Dunn English =

American politician

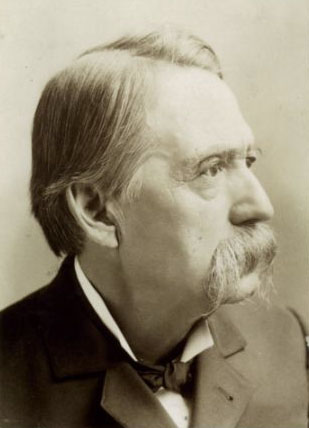

Member of the U.S. House of Representatives from New Jersey's 6th district
- In office March 4, 1891 – March 3, 1895
- Preceded by: Herman Lehlbach
- Succeeded by: Richard W. Parker

Personal details
- Born: June 29, 1819 Philadelphia, Pennsylvania, U.S.
- Died: April 1, 1902 (aged 82) Newark, New Jersey, U.S.
- Party: Democratic

Thomas Dunn English (June 29, 1819 – April 1, 1902) was an American Democratic Party politician from New Jersey who represented the state's 6th congressional district in the House of Representatives from 1891 to 1895. He was also a published author and songwriter, who had a bitter feud with Edgar Allan Poe. Along with Waitman T. Barbe and Danske Dandridge, English was considered a major West Virginia poet of the mid 19th century.

== Biography ==
English was born in Philadelphia on June 29, 1819. He attended the Friends Academy in Burlington, New Jersey, and graduated from the University of Pennsylvania School of Medicine in 1839. His graduation thesis was on phrenology. He studied law, and was admitted to the Philadelphia bar in 1842. He was a founding member of the American Numismatic Society in 1858. By then, his career as a journalist and writer was already well underway.

=== Literary pursuits ===
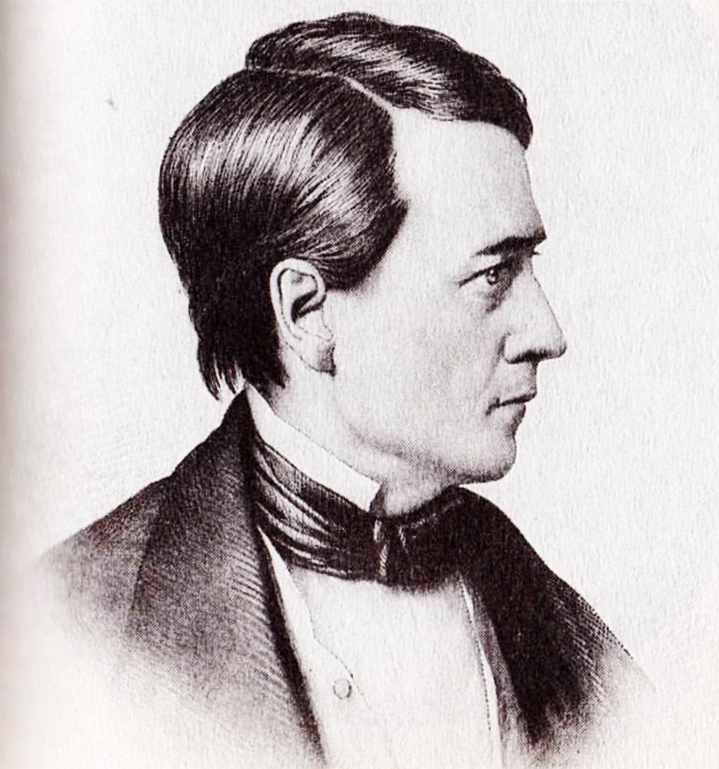
Thomas Dunn English

English wrote scores of poems and plays as well as stories and novels, but his reputation as a writer was built on the ballad "Ben Bolt" (1843). Written for Nathaniel Parker Willis's New-York Mirror, it was turned into a song and became very popular, with a ship, steamboat and racehorse soon named in its honor. American opera singer Eleonora de Cisneros recorded this on an Edison Blue Amberol cylinder in 1912.

Other works include the temperance novel Walter Woolfe, or the Doom of the Drinker in 1842 and the political romance MDCCCXLII. or the Power of the S. F. in 1846. He was the founding editor of the monthly The Aristidean in New York, which printed its first issue in February 1845. English later edited several other journals, including the humorous magazine The John Donkey, American Review: A Whig Journal and Sartain's Magazine.

The Aristidean, September, 1845, Edgar Allan Poe's personal copy believed to contain his anonymous reviews

English was a friend of author Edgar Allan Poe, but the two fell out amidst a public scandal involving Poe and the writers Frances Sargent Osgood and Elizabeth F. Ellet. After suggestions that her letters to Poe contained indiscreet material, Ellet asked her brother to demand the return of the letters. Poe, who claimed he had already returned the letters, asked English for a pistol to defend himself from Ellet's infuriated brother. English was skeptical of Poe's story and suggested that he end the scandal by retracting the "unfounded charges" against Ellet. The angry Poe pushed English into a fistfight, during which his face was cut by English's ring. Poe later claimed to have given English "a flogging which he will remember to the day of his death", though English denied it; either way, the fight ended their friendship and stoked further gossip about the scandal.

Later that year, Poe harshly criticized English's work as part of his "Literati of New York" series published in Godey's Lady's Book, referring to him as "a man without the commonest school education busying himself in attempts to instruct mankind in topics of literature". Poe also wrote that English "edited for several months a magazine [The Aristidean].... [He] had, for the motto on his magazine cover, the words of Richelieu,—Men call me cruel; I am not:—I am Just. Here the monosyllables 'an ass' should have been appended."

English and Poe had several confrontations, usually centered around literary caricatures of one another. One of English's letters, which was published in the July 23, 1846, issue of the New York Mirror, caused Poe to successfully sue the editors of the Mirror for libel. Poe was awarded $225.06 as well as an additional $101.42 in court costs. That year English published a novel called 1844, or, The Power of the S.F. Its plot made references to secret societies, and ultimately was about revenge. It included a character named Marmaduke Hammerhead, the famous author of The Black Crow, who uses phrases like "Nevermore" and "lost Lenore." The clear parody of Poe was portrayed as a drunkard, liar, and domestic abuser. Poe's story "The Cask of Amontillado" was written as a response, using very specific references to English's novel. Another Poe revenge tale, "Hop-Frog", may also reference English. Years later, in 1870, when English edited the magazine The Old Guard, founded by the Poe-defender Charles Chauncey Burr, he found occasion to publish both an anti-Poe article (June 1870) and an article defending Poe's greatest detractor Rufus Wilmot Griswold (October 1870).

=== Political career ===
English's first foray into politics was as an advocate of the annexation of Texas. He moved to present-day Logan, West Virginia, in 1852, to New York City in 1857, and to Newark, New Jersey, a year later. He was a member of the New Jersey General Assembly in 1863 and 1864.

English was elected as a Democrat to the Fifty-second and Fifty-third Congresses, serving in office from March 4, 1891, to March 3, 1895. He was chairman of the Committee on Alcoholic Liquor Traffic (Fifty-third Congress). He was an unsuccessful candidate for reelection in 1894 to the Fifty-fourth Congress.

=== Later life and death ===
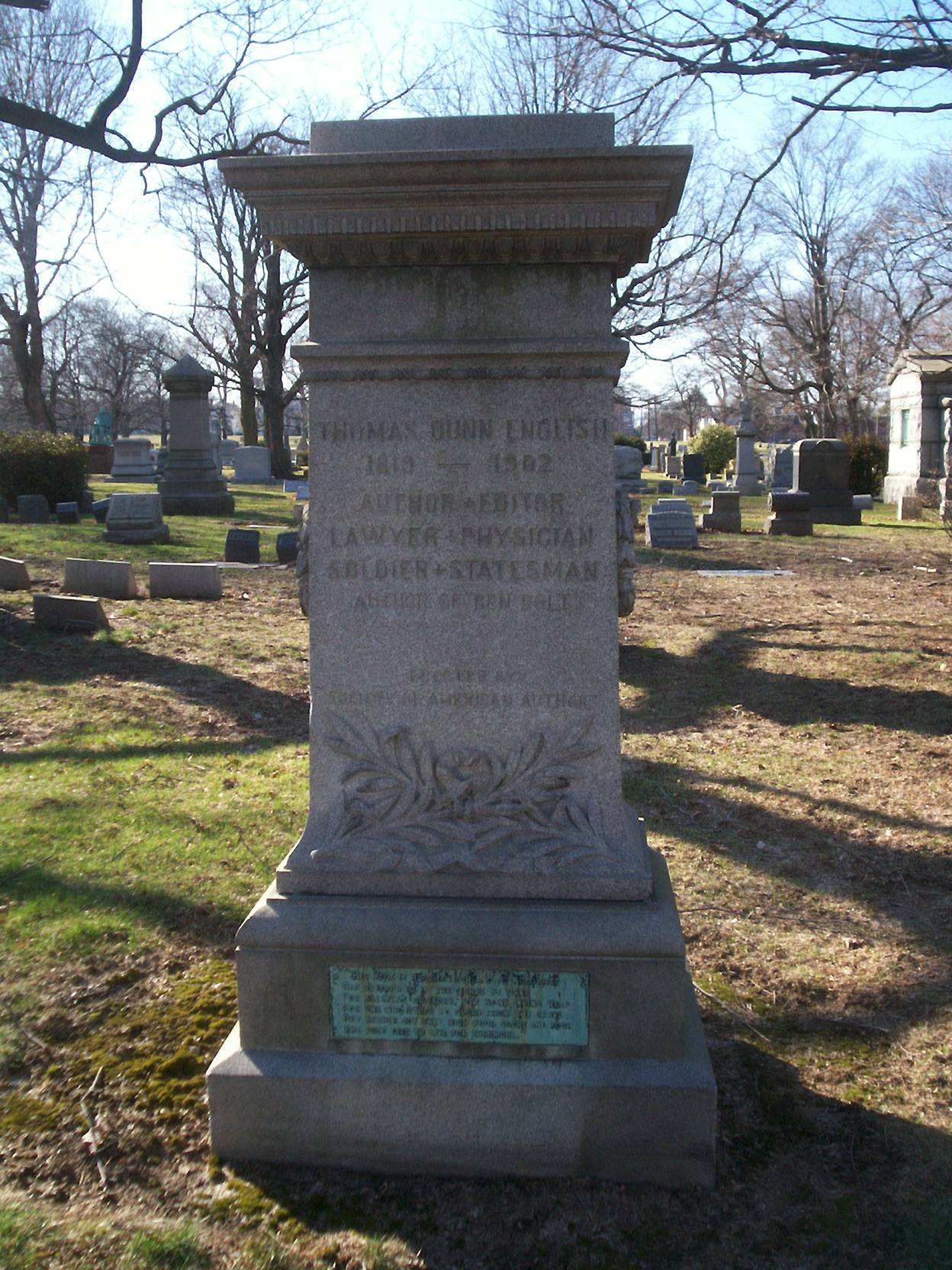
Grave of Thomas Dunn English

After leaving Congress, English resumed his former literary pursuits in Newark. In 1896, he published Reminisces of Poe, in which he hinted at scandals without specificity. He did, however, defend Poe against rumors of drug use: "Had Poe the opium habit when I knew him (before 1846) I should both as a physician and a man of observation, have discovered it during his frequent visits to my rooms, my visits at his house, and our meetings elsewhere – I saw no signs of it and believe the charge to be a baseless slander".

English died April 1, 1902, and was interred in Fairmount Cemetery in Newark. His monument notes him as "Author of Ben Bolt".

== Selected list of works ==
- Zephaniah Doolittle (1838) (as Montmorency Sneerlip Snags Esq.)
- Walter Woolfe, or the Doom of the Drinker (1842)
- Ben Bolt (1843)
- MDCCCXLII. or the Power of the S. F. (1846)
- Gasology: A Satire (1877)
- Reminiscences of Poe (1896)

U.S. House of Representatives
Preceded by Herman Lehlbach	Member of the U.S. House of Representatives from New Jersey's 6th congressional district March 4, 1891 – March 3, 1895	Succeeded by Richard W. Parker
