= Henry Lang (politician) =

American politician (1828–1896)

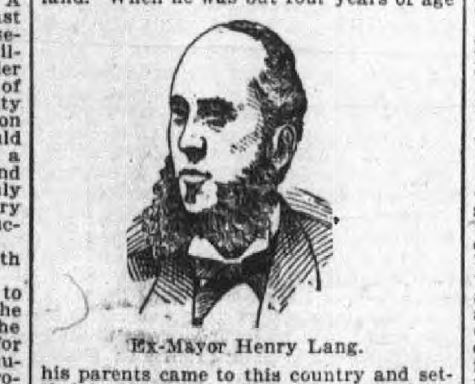

19th Mayor of Newark
- In office 1882–1884
- Preceded by: William H. F. Fiedler
- Succeeded by: Joseph E. Haynes

Personal details
- Born: February 7, 1828
- Died: February 18, 1896 (aged 68)
- Political party: Republican

Henry Lang (February 7, 1828 – February 18, 1896) was an American politician who served as the Mayor of Newark from 1882 to 1884. He left one son William F. Lang.

Mr. Lang was born in Scotland and came to New York City at four years of age. At age 15, he began working in Newark at a leather establishment with John R. Crockett. In 1869, he founded a large plant on Plane (now University) and New which manufactured trucks, bags, harnesses, bridles, and other kinds of leather. His business eventually grew to eight buildings.

In 1877, Lang was elected Alderman and two years later Councilman. In 1881 he was elected Mayor. One of his first and most important acts was to "devise a scheme for the paving of Broad and Market streets with the first granite blocks ever laid on those thoroughfares".
