= Nehemiah Perry (politician) =

American politician

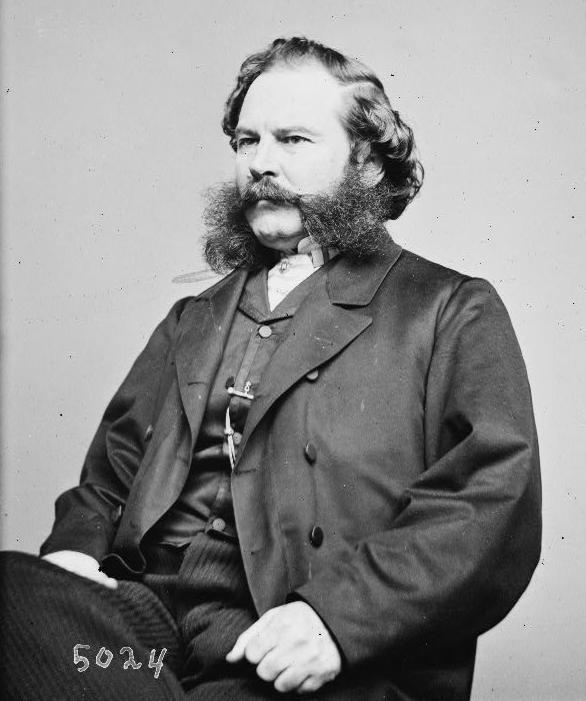

Member of the U.S. House of Representatives from New Jersey's 5th district
- In office March 4, 1861 – March 3, 1865
- Preceded by: William Pennington
- Succeeded by: Edwin R. V. Wright

Member of the New Jersey General Assembly
- In office 1850; 1856

Personal details
- Born: March 30, 1816 Ridgefield, Connecticut, USA
- Died: November 1, 1881 (aged 65) Newark, New Jersey, USA
- Party: Democratic
- Profession: Politician, Clerk, Cloth Manufacturer

Nehemiah Perry (March 30, 1816 – November 1, 1881) was an American clerk, cloth manufacturer and Democratic Party politician who represented New Jersey's 5th congressional district in the United States House of Representatives from 1861 to 1865.

== Biography ==
Born in Ridgefield, Connecticut, Perry was educated there at Wesleyan Seminary. He clerked in a store in Norwalk, Connecticut, and another in New York City. He moved to Newark, New Jersey, in 1836 and engaged in manufacturing cloth and other work in the clothing business. He was a member of the New Jersey General Assembly in 1850 and 1856, serving as Speaker of the Assembly in the latter year. He was a member of the Newark Common Council in 1852.

Perry was elected a Democrat to Congress in 1860, defeating the incumbent Republican Speaker of the House, William Pennington. Perry served from 1861 to 1865, not seeking re-election in 1864. Afterwards, Perry resumed former manufacturing pursuits and was mayor of Newark, New Jersey, in 1873. He died in Newark on November 1, 1881, and was interred in Mount Pleasant Cemetery in Newark.

U.S. House of Representatives
Preceded by William Pennington	Member of the U.S. House of Representatives from New Jersey's 5th congressional district March 4, 1861 – March 3, 1865	Succeeded by Edwin R. V. Wright
Political offices
Preceded by Frederick W. Ricord	Mayor of Newark, New Jersey; 1873	Succeeded by Henry J. Yates
