= New Jersey's 6th congressional district =

U.S. House district for New Jersey

Coordinates: 40°27′04″N 74°14′42″W

- Interactive map of district boundaries since January 3, 2023
- Representative: Frank Pallone; D–Long Branch
- Distribution: 100% urban; 0% rural
- Population (2025): 796,679
- Median household income: $113,620
- Ethnicity: 41.8% White; 24.5% Hispanic; 19.2% Asian; 10.4% Black; 2.9% Two or more races; 1.1% other
- Cook PVI: D+5

New Jersey's 6th congressional district is a congressional district in central New Jersey. The district includes the northern and eastern portions of Middlesex County and the coastal areas of Monmouth County, including towns along the Raritan Bay and Jersey Shore.

The district has consistently been oriented on the Raritan Bay and Jersey Shore. Following redistricting in 2021, heavily Democratic Neptune Township and Red Bank were drawn into the district while Republican-leaning Marlboro Township was drawn out. According to estimates from The Cook Political Report, those changes made the district more favorable towards Democrats.

Democrat Frank Pallone has represented the district in Congress since 1993.

== Counties and municipalities in the district ==
For the 118th and successive Congresses (based on redistricting following the 2020 census), the district contains all or portions of two counties and 38 municipalities.

Middlesex County: (12)

Carteret, Edison, Highland Park, Metuchen, New Brunswick, Old Bridge Township (part; also 12th; includes Laurence Harbor and Madison Park), Perth Amboy, Piscataway, Sayreville, South Amboy, South Plainfield, Woodbridge Township

Monmouth County: (26)

Aberdeen Township, Allenhurst, Asbury Park, Atlantic Highlands, Bradley Beach, Deal, Fair Haven, Hazlet, Highlands, Interlaken, Keansburg, Keyport, Little Silver, Loch Arbour, Long Branch, Matawan, Middletown Township (part; also 4th; includes Leonardo and part of Belford, Fairview, North Middletown, and Port Monmouth), Monmouth Beach, Neptune City, Neptune Township, Oceanport, Red Bank, Rumson, Sea Bright, Union Beach, West Long Branch

== Recent election results from statewide races ==
Year	Office	Results
2008	President	Obama 60% - 39%
2012	President	Obama 64% - 36%
2016	President	Clinton 58% - 39%
2017	Governor	Murphy 56% - 41%
2018	Senate	Menendez 57% - 39%
2020	President	Biden 59% - 40%
2020	Senate	Booker 59% - 38%
2021	Governor	Murphy 53% - 46%
2024	President	Harris 52% - 46%
2024	Senate	Kim 54% - 42%
2025	Governor	Sherrill 60% - 39%

== List of members representing the district ==
Member (District home)	Party	Years	Cong ress	Electoral history	Counties/Towns
District established March 4, 1873
Marcus L. Ward (Newark)	Republican	March 4, 1873 – March 3, 1875	43rd	Elected in 1872. Lost re-election.	1873–1893; Essex
Frederick H. Teese (Newark)	Democratic	March 4, 1875 – March 3, 1877	44th	Elected in 1874. Renominated but declined.	1873–1893; Essex
Thomas B. Peddie (Newark)	Republican	March 4, 1877 – March 3, 1879	45th	Elected in 1876. Retired.	1873–1893; Essex
John L. Blake (Orange)	Republican	March 4, 1879 – March 3, 1881	46th	Elected in 1878. Retired.	1873–1893; Essex
Phineas Jones (Newark)	Republican	March 4, 1881 – March 3, 1883	47th	Elected in 1880. Retired.	1873–1893; Essex
William H.F. Fiedler (Newark)	Democratic	March 4, 1883 – March 3, 1885	48th	Elected in 1882. Lost re-election.	1873–1893; Essex
Herman Lehlbach (Newark)	Republican	March 4, 1885 – March 3, 1891	49th 50th 51st	Elected in 1884. Re-elected in 1886. Re-elected in 1888. Retired.	1873–1893; Essex
Thomas D. English (Newark)	Democratic	March 4, 1891 – March 3, 1895	52nd 53rd	Elected in 1890. Re-elected in 1892. Lost re-election.	1873–1893; Essex
Thomas D. English (Newark)	Democratic	March 4, 1891 – March 3, 1895	52nd 53rd	Elected in 1890. Re-elected in 1892. Lost re-election.	1893–1895; City of Newark
Richard W. Parker (Newark)	Republican	March 4, 1895 – March 3, 1903	54th 55th 56th 57th	Elected in 1894. Re-elected in 1896. Re-elected in 1898. Re-elected in 1900. Redistricted to the 7th district.	1895–1903; Newark and East Orange
William Hughes (Paterson)	Democratic	March 4, 1903 – March 3, 1905	58th	Elected in 1902. Lost re-election.	1903–1913; Bergen, Passaic, and Sussex
Henry C. Allen (Little Falls)	Republican	March 4, 1905 – March 3, 1907	59th	Elected in 1904. Retired.	1903–1913; Bergen, Passaic, and Sussex
William Hughes (Paterson)	Democratic	March 4, 1907 – September 27, 1912	60th 61st 62nd	Elected in 1906. Re-elected in 1908. Re-elected in 1910. Resigned after appointment as judge of Court of Common Pleas of Passaic County.	1903–1913; Bergen, Passaic, and Sussex
Vacant		September 27, 1912 – November 5, 1912	62nd		1903–1913; Bergen, Passaic, and Sussex
Archibald C. Hart (Hackensack)	Democratic	November 5, 1912 – March 3, 1913	62nd	Elected to finish Hughes's term. Lost renomination.	1903–1913; Bergen, Passaic, and Sussex
Lewis J. Martin (Newton)	Democratic	March 4, 1913 – May 5, 1913	63rd	Elected in 1912. Died.	1913–1933; Bergen, Sussex, and Warren; northern Passaic (Bloomingdale, Ringwood, Wanaque, West Milford)
Vacant		May 5, 1913 – July 22, 1913	63rd		1913–1933; Bergen, Sussex, and Warren; northern Passaic (Bloomingdale, Ringwood, Wanaque, West Milford)
Archibald C. Hart (Hackensack)	Democratic	July 22, 1913 – March 3, 1917	63rd 64th	Elected to finish Martin's term. Re-elected in 1914. Retired.	1913–1933; Bergen, Sussex, and Warren; northern Passaic (Bloomingdale, Ringwood, Wanaque, West Milford)
John R. Ramsey (Hackensack)	Republican	March 4, 1917 – March 3, 1921	65th 66th	Elected in 1916. Re-elected in 1918. Lost renomination.	1913–1933; Bergen, Sussex, and Warren; northern Passaic (Bloomingdale, Ringwood, Wanaque, West Milford)
Randolph Perkins (Woodcliff Lake)	Republican	March 4, 1921 – March 4, 1933	67th 68th 69th 70th 71st 72nd	Elected in 1920. Re-elected in 1922. Re-elected in 1924. Re-elected in 1926. Re-elected in 1928. Re-elected in 1930. Redistricted to the 7th district.	1913–1933; Bergen, Sussex, and Warren; northern Passaic (Bloomingdale, Ringwood, Wanaque, West Milford)
Donald H. McLean (Elizabeth)	Republican	March 4, 1933 – January 3, 1945	73rd 74th 75th 76th 77th 78th	Elected in 1932. Re-elected in 1934. Re-elected in 1936. Re-elected in 1938. Re-elected in 1940. Re-elected in 1942. Retired.	1933–1969; Union County
Clifford P. Case (Rahway)	Republican	January 3, 1945 – August 16, 1953	79th 80th 81st 82nd 83rd	Elected in 1944. Re-elected in 1946. Re-elected in 1948. Re-elected in 1950. Re-elected in 1952. Resigned to become president of the Fund for the Republic.	1933–1969; Union County
Vacant		August 16, 1953 – November 3, 1953	83rd		1933–1969; Union County
Harrison A. Williams Jr. (Plainfield)	Democratic	November 3, 1953 – January 3, 1957	83rd 84th	Elected to finish Case's term. Re-elected in 1954. Lost re-election.	1933–1969; Union County
Florence P. Dwyer (Elizabeth)	Republican	January 3, 1957 – January 3, 1967	85th 86th 87th 88th 89th	Elected in 1956. Re-elected in 1958. Re-elected in 1960. Re-elected in 1962. Re-elected in 1964. Redistricted to the 12th district.	1933–1969; Union County
William T. Cahill (Collingswood)	Republican	January 3, 1967 – January 19, 1970	90th 91st	Redistricted from the 1st district and re-elected in 1966. Re-elected in 1968. Resigned after being elected governor.	1967–1969 [data missing]
William T. Cahill (Collingswood)	Republican	January 3, 1967 – January 19, 1970	90th 91st	Redistricted from the 1st district and re-elected in 1966. Re-elected in 1968. Resigned after being elected governor.	1969–1973; Burlington, parts of Camden and Ocean
Vacant		January 19, 1970 – November 3, 1970	91st		1969–1973; Burlington, parts of Camden and Ocean
Edwin B. Forsythe (Moorestown)	Republican	November 3, 1970 – January 3, 1983	91st 92nd 93rd 94th 95th 96th 97th	Elected to finish Cahill's term. Elected to full term in 1970. Re-elected in 1972. Re-elected in 1974. Re-elected in 1976. Re-elected in 1978. Re-elected in 1980. Redistricted to the 13th district.	1969–1973; Burlington, parts of Camden and Ocean
Edwin B. Forsythe (Moorestown)	Republican	November 3, 1970 – January 3, 1983	91st 92nd 93rd 94th 95th 96th 97th	Elected to finish Cahill's term. Elected to full term in 1970. Re-elected in 1972. Re-elected in 1974. Re-elected in 1976. Re-elected in 1978. Re-elected in 1980. Redistricted to the 13th district.	1973–1983 parts of Burlington, Camden, and Ocean
Bernard J. Dwyer (Edison)	Democratic	January 3, 1983 – January 3, 1993	98th 99th 100th 101st 102nd	Redistricted from the 15th district and re-elected in 1982. Re-elected in 1984. Re-elected in 1986. Re-elected in 1988. Re-elected in 1990. Retired.	1983–1985 parts of Middlesex and Union (Linden and Rahway)
Bernard J. Dwyer (Edison)	Democratic	January 3, 1983 – January 3, 1993	98th 99th 100th 101st 102nd	Redistricted from the 15th district and re-elected in 1982. Re-elected in 1984. Re-elected in 1986. Re-elected in 1988. Re-elected in 1990. Retired.	1985–1993 parts of Middlesex, Monmouth (Aberdeen and Matawan), and Union (Linden, Rahway, and Roselle)
Frank Pallone (Long Branch)	Democratic	January 3, 1993 – present	103rd 104th 105th 106th 107th 108th 109th 110th 111th 112th 113th 114th 115th 116th 117th 118th 119th	Redistricted from the 3rd district and re-elected in 1992. Re-elected in 1994. Re-elected in 1996. Re-elected in 1998. Re-elected in 2000. Re-elected in 2002. Re-elected in 2004. Re-elected in 2006. Re-elected in 2008. Re-elected in 2010. Re-elected in 2012. Re-elected in 2014. Re-elected in 2016. Re-elected in 2018. Re-elected in 2020. Re-elected in 2022. Re-elected in 2024. Re-elected in 2026.	1993–2003 parts of Middlesex and Monmouth
Frank Pallone (Long Branch)	Democratic	January 3, 1993 – present	103rd 104th 105th 106th 107th 108th 109th 110th 111th 112th 113th 114th 115th 116th 117th 118th 119th	Redistricted from the 3rd district and re-elected in 1992. Re-elected in 1994. Re-elected in 1996. Re-elected in 1998. Re-elected in 2000. Re-elected in 2002. Re-elected in 2004. Re-elected in 2006. Re-elected in 2008. Re-elected in 2010. Re-elected in 2012. Re-elected in 2014. Re-elected in 2016. Re-elected in 2018. Re-elected in 2020. Re-elected in 2022. Re-elected in 2024. Re-elected in 2026.	2003–2013 parts of Middlesex, Monmouth, Somerset (Franklin), and Union (Plainfield)
Frank Pallone (Long Branch)	Democratic	January 3, 1993 – present	103rd 104th 105th 106th 107th 108th 109th 110th 111th 112th 113th 114th 115th 116th 117th 118th 119th	Redistricted from the 3rd district and re-elected in 1992. Re-elected in 1994. Re-elected in 1996. Re-elected in 1998. Re-elected in 2000. Re-elected in 2002. Re-elected in 2004. Re-elected in 2006. Re-elected in 2008. Re-elected in 2010. Re-elected in 2012. Re-elected in 2014. Re-elected in 2016. Re-elected in 2018. Re-elected in 2020. Re-elected in 2022. Re-elected in 2024. Re-elected in 2026.	2013–2023: parts of Middlesex and Monmouth
Frank Pallone (Long Branch)	Democratic	January 3, 1993 – present	103rd 104th 105th 106th 107th 108th 109th 110th 111th 112th 113th 114th 115th 116th 117th 118th 119th	Redistricted from the 3rd district and re-elected in 1992. Re-elected in 1994. Re-elected in 1996. Re-elected in 1998. Re-elected in 2000. Re-elected in 2002. Re-elected in 2004. Re-elected in 2006. Re-elected in 2008. Re-elected in 2010. Re-elected in 2012. Re-elected in 2014. Re-elected in 2016. Re-elected in 2018. Re-elected in 2020. Re-elected in 2022. Re-elected in 2024. Re-elected in 2026.	2023–present: parts of Middlesex and Monmouth

== Recent election results ==
=== 2012 ===
New Jersey's 6th congressional district, 2012
Party	Candidate	Votes	%
Democratic	Frank Pallone (incumbent)	151,782	63.3
Republican	Anna Little	84,360	35.2
Libertarian	Len Flynn	1,392	0.6
Independent	Karen Zaletel	868	0.4
Independent	Mac Dara Lyden	830	0.3
Reform	Herbert Tarbous	406	0.2
Total votes		239,638	100.0
Democratic hold			

=== 2014 ===
New Jersey's 6th congressional district, 2014
Party	Candidate	Votes	%
Democratic	Frank Pallone (incumbent)	72,190	59.9
Republican	Anthony E. Wilkinson	46,891	38.9
Libertarian	Dorit Goikhman	1,376	1.2
Total votes		120,457	100.0
Democratic hold			

=== 2016 ===
New Jersey's 6th congressional district, 2016
Party	Candidate	Votes	%
Democratic	Frank Pallone (incumbent)	167,895	63.7
Republican	Brent Sonnek-Schmelz	91,908	34.9
Green	Rajit B. Malliah	1,912	0.7
Libertarian	Judith Shamy	1,720	0.7
Total votes		263,435	100.0
Democratic hold			

=== 2018 ===
New Jersey's 6th congressional district, 2018
Party	Candidate	Votes	%
Democratic	Frank Pallone Jr. (incumbent)	140,752	63.6
Republican	Richard J. Pezzullo	80,443	36.4
Total votes		221,195	100.0
Democratic hold			

=== 2020 ===
New Jersey's 6th congressional district, 2020
Party	Candidate	Votes	%
Democratic	Frank Pallone Jr. (incumbent)	199,648	61.2
Republican	Christian Onuoha	126,760	38.8
Total votes		326,408	100.0
Democratic hold			

=== 2022 ===
New Jersey's 6th congressional district, 2022
Party	Candidate	Votes	%
Democratic	Frank Pallone (incumbent)	106,238	57.5
Republican	Sue Kiley	75,839	41.0
Libertarian	Tara Fisher	1,361	0.7
Independent	Inder Soni	947	0.5
Independent	Eric Antisell	534	0.3
Total votes		184,919	100.0
Democratic hold			

=== 2024 ===
New Jersey's 6th congressional district, 2024
Party	Candidate	Votes	%
Democratic	Frank Pallone (incumbent)	170,275	56.1
Republican	Scott Fegler	122,519	40.3
Independent	Fahad Akhtar	4,871	1.6
Green	Herb Tarbous	4,246	1.4
Libertarian	Matthew Amitrano	1,770	0.6
Total votes		303,681	100.0
Democratic hold			
