= Ricord =

Ricord is a surname. Notable people with the surname include:

- Auguste Ricord (1911–1985), French heroin trafficker
- Elizabeth Ricord (1788–1865), American educator
- Elsie Alvarado de Ricord (1928–2005), Panamanian writer
- Frederick William Ricord (1819–1897), American author
- Jean Baptiste Ricord (1777–1837), French-American physician
- John Ricord (1813–1861), American lawyer
- Philippe Ricord (1800–1889), French physician
- Pyotr Ivanovich Ricord (1776–1855), Russian admiral
