= Vredenburgh =

Vredenburgh may refer to:

== People ==
- Dorothy Vredenburgh Bush (1916-1991), American political activist
- John Vredenburgh Van Pelt (1874–1962), American architect, historian and writer
- Peter Vredenburgh Jr. (1837–1864), lawyer and Union Army officer in the American Civil War
- Peter Vredenburgh (judge) (1805–1873), associate justice of the New Jersey Supreme Court
- Peter Vredenburgh (politician) (1836–1915), member of the Wisconsin State Assembly
- William H. Vredenburgh (1840–1920), Judge of the New Jersey Court of Errors and Appeals

== Places ==
- Vredenburgh, Alabama, town in the United States
- Fort Vredenburgh, fort on the Dutch Gold Coast, Ghana

== See also ==
- Vredenburg (disambiguation)
- Peter Vredenburgh (disambiguation)
