= Robert Gilchrist Jr. =

American politician

Robert Gilchrist Jr. (August 21, 1825 – July 6, 1888) was the Attorney General of New Jersey from 1870 to 1875.

== Biography ==
Gilchrist was born in Jersey City, New Jersey, in 1825 to Robert Gilchrist and Frances (Fanny) Vacher. His father served as Clerk of Hudson County from 1840 to 1865 and as mayor of Jersey City from 1850 to 1852. He attended private schools, studied law, and was admitted to the New Jersey Bar in 1847. In 1859 he served in the New Jersey General Assembly.

At the first call for troops in the Civil War, Gilchrist enlisted as a Captain in the 2nd New Jersey Regiment, serving from 1861 to 1865. In 1866, he was the Democratic candidate for the House of Representatives in the Fifth District but was defeated by the Republican George A. Halsey.

In 1869, Gilchrist was nominated by Governor Theodore Fitz Randolph as Attorney General. He was reappointed for a full five-year term in January 1870. In 1873, Governor Joel Parker appointed him to a commission assigned to revise the New Jersey State Constitution. Gilchrist retired from the position of Attorney General in 1875.

After serving as Attorney General, Gilchrist returned to private practice in Jersey City. He married late in life to Fredericka Raymond Beardsley, who wrote The True Story of Hamlet and Ophelia (1889). Gilchrist died at his home in Jersey City in 1888.

Legal offices
Preceded by George M. Robeson	Attorney General of New Jersey; 1870 – 1875	Succeeded by Joel Parker
