= Peter Vredenburgh =

Peter Vredenburgh may refer to:

- Peter Vredenburgh Jr. (1837–1864), lawyer and Union Army officer in the American Civil War
- Peter Vredenburgh (judge) (1805–1873), associate justice of the New Jersey Supreme Court
- Peter Vredenburgh (politician) (1836–1915), member of the Wisconsin State Assembly
