= 1865 New Jersey gubernatorial election =

- November 7, 1865
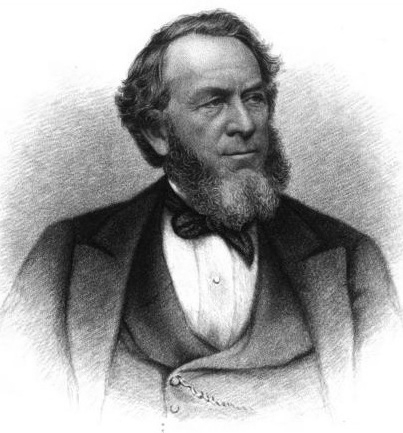

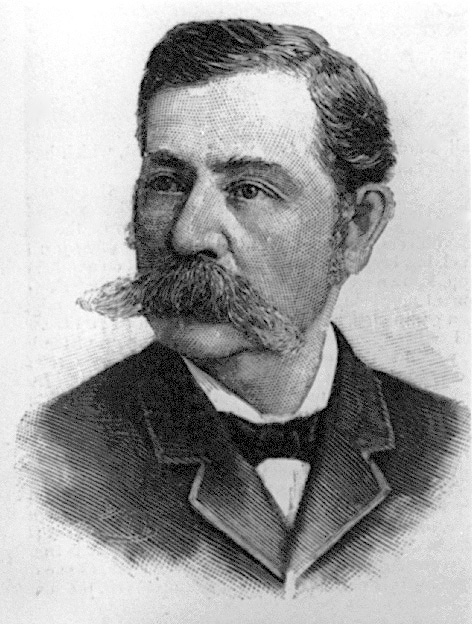
Nominee	Marcus Lawrence Ward	Theodore Runyon
Party	National Union	Democratic
Popular vote	67,525	64,706
Percentage	51.07%	48.93%
- County results Ward: 50–60% 60–70% Runyon: 50–60% 60–70%
Governor before election
Joel Parker
Democratic
Elected Governor
Marcus Lawrence Ward
National Union

The 1865 New Jersey gubernatorial election was held on November 7, 1865. National Union nominee Marcus Lawrence Ward defeated Democratic nominee Theodore Runyon with 51.07% of the vote.

== General election ==
=== Candidates ===
- Marcus Lawrence Ward, nominee for Governor in 1862 (National Union)
- Theodore Runyon, Mayor of Newark (Democratic)

=== Results ===
New Jersey gubernatorial election, 1865
Party	Candidate	Votes	%	±%
National Union	Marcus Lawrence Ward	67,525	51.07%	▲7.83
Democratic	Theodore Runyon	64,706	48.93%	▼7.83
Majority				
Total votes		132,231		
National Union gain from Democratic		Swing		
