= 1871 New Jersey gubernatorial election =

- November 7, 1871
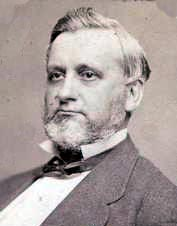

Nominee	Joel Parker	Cornelius Walsh
Party	Democratic	Republican
Popular vote	82,362	76,383
Percentage	51.88%	48.12%
- County results Parker: 50–60% 60–70% Walsh: 50–60%
Governor before election
Theodore Fitz Randolph
Democratic
Elected Governor
Joel Parker
Democratic

The 1871 New Jersey gubernatorial election was held on November 7, 1871. Democratic nominee Joel Parker defeated Republican nominee Cornelius Walsh with 51.88% of the vote.

== General election ==
=== Candidates ===
- Joel Parker, former Governor of New Jersey (Democratic)
- Cornelius Walsh, trunk manufacturer (Republican)

=== Results ===
New Jersey gubernatorial election, 1871
Party	Candidate	Votes	%	±%
Democratic	Joel Parker	82,362	51.88%	▲0.46
Republican	Cornelius Walsh	76,383	48.12%	▼0.46
Majority				
Total votes		158,745	100.00%	
Democratic hold		Swing		
