= 1874 New Jersey gubernatorial election =

- November 3, 1874
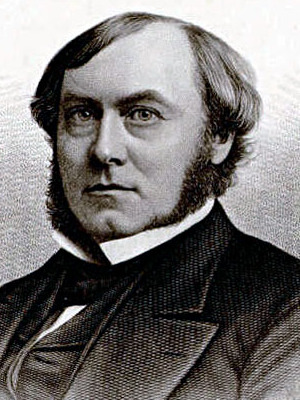

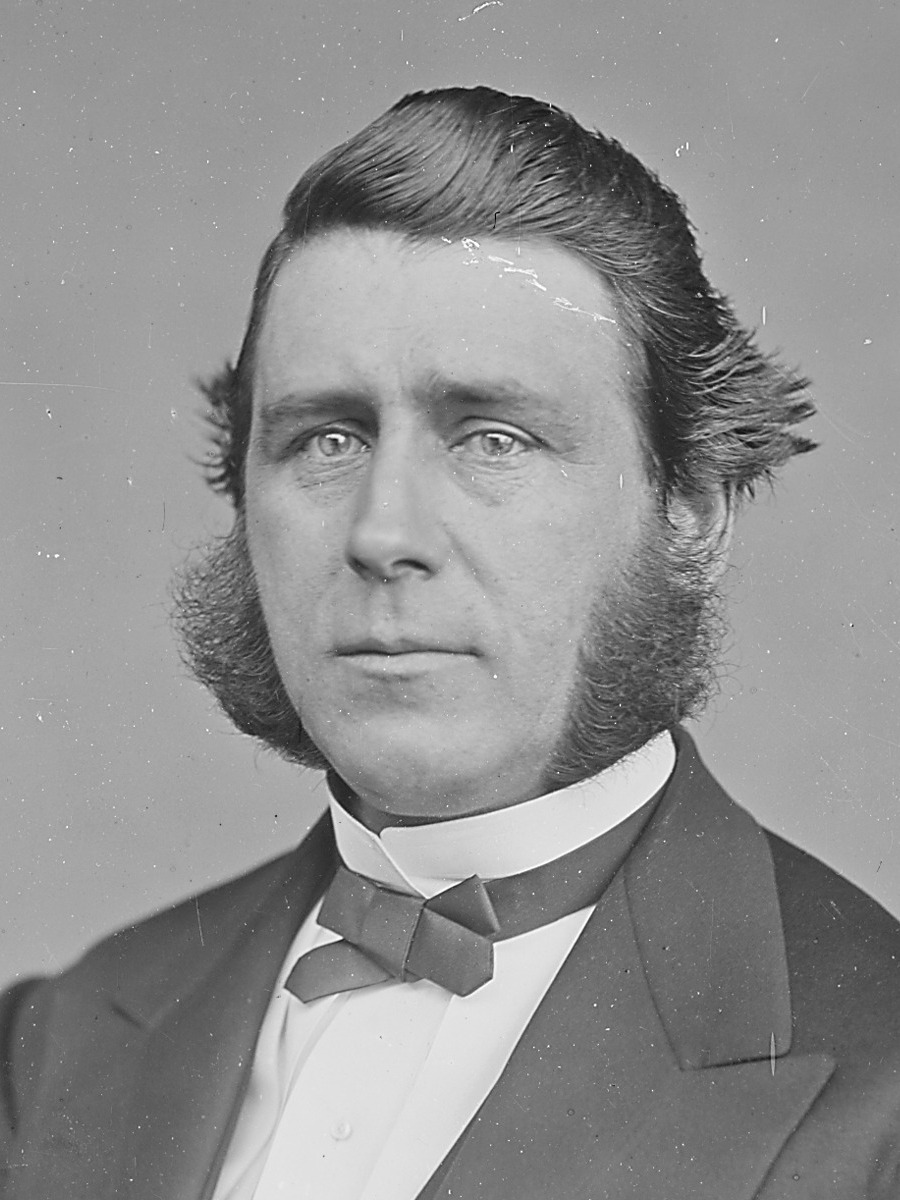
Nominee	Joseph D. Bedle	George A. Halsey
Party	Democratic	Republican
Popular vote	97,283	84,050
Percentage	53.65%	46.35%
- County results Bedle: 50–60% 60–70% Halsey: 50–60%
Governor before election
Joel Parker
Democratic
Elected Governor
Joseph D. Bedle
Democratic

The 1874 New Jersey gubernatorial election was held on November 3, 1874. Democratic nominee Joseph D. Bedle defeated Republican nominee George A. Halsey with 53.65% of the vote.

== General election ==
=== Candidates ===
- Joseph D. Bedle, Associate Justice of the New Jersey Supreme Court (Democratic)
- George A. Halsey, former U.S. Representative from Newark (Republican)

=== Results ===
New Jersey gubernatorial election, 1874
Party	Candidate	Votes	%	±%
Democratic	Joseph D. Bedle	97,283	53.65%	▲1.77
Republican	George A. Halsey	84,050	46.35%	▼1.77
Majority				
Total votes		181,333	100.00%	
Democratic hold		Swing		
