= 1868 New Jersey gubernatorial election =

- November 3, 1868
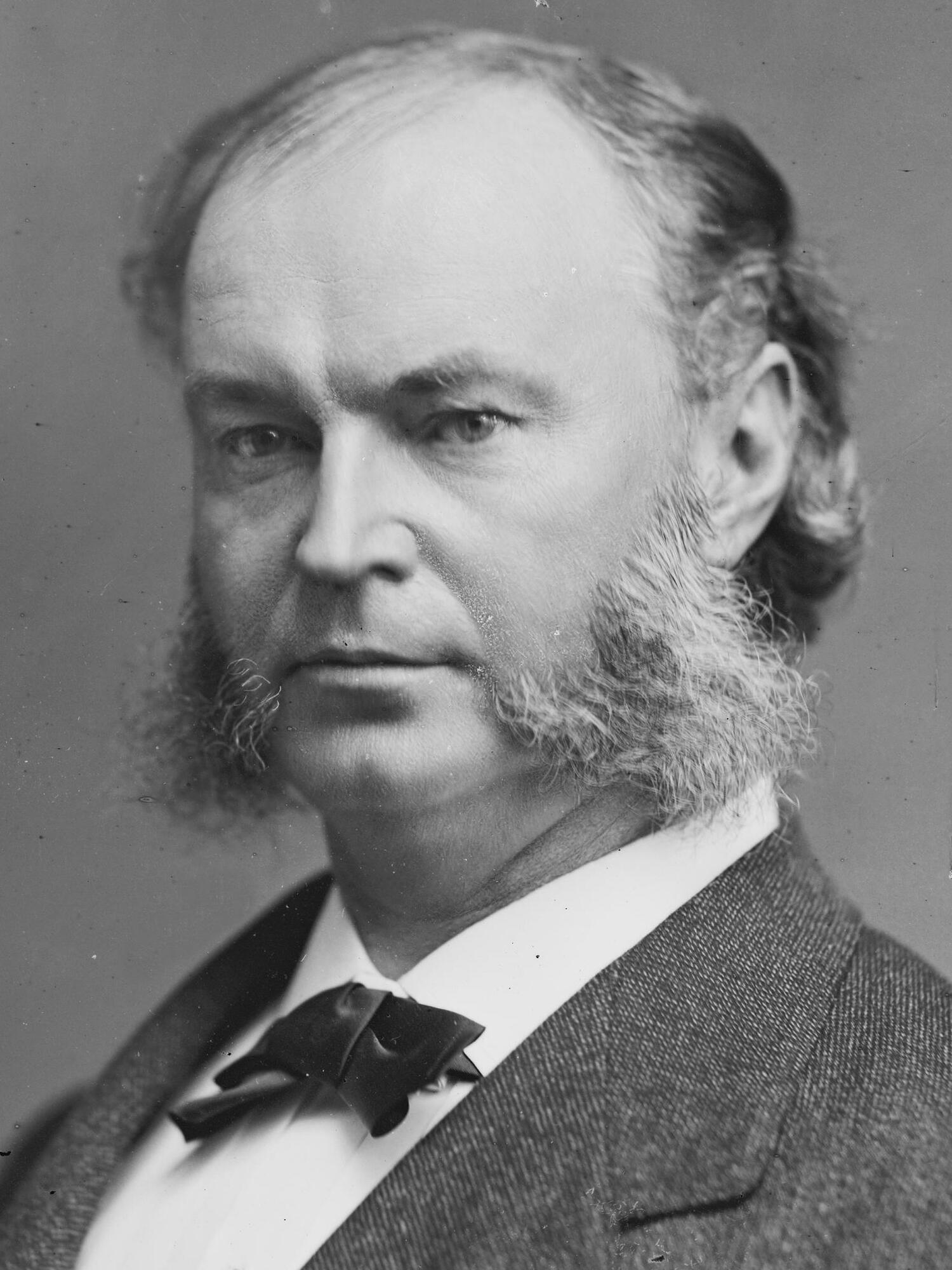

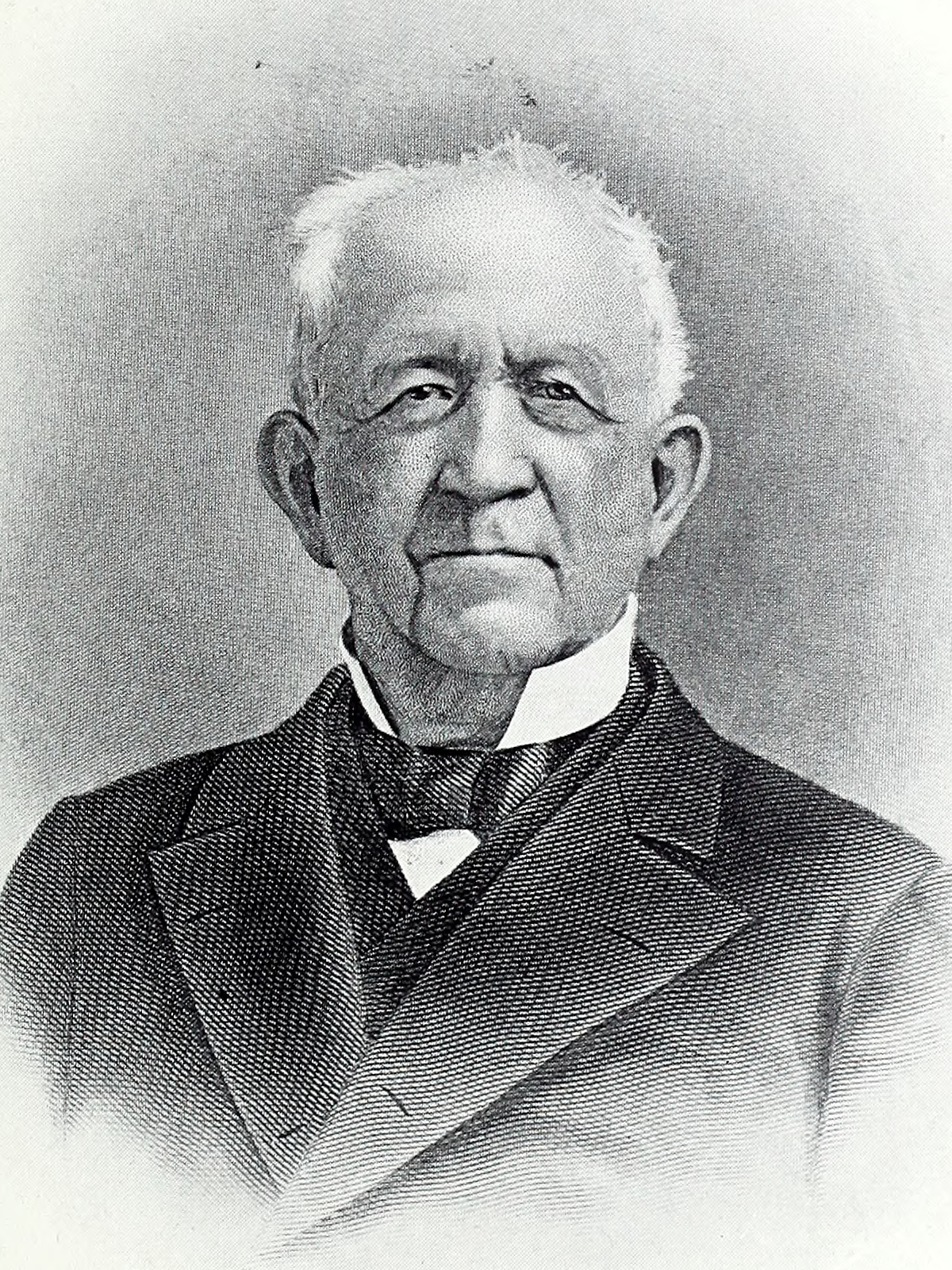
Nominee	Theodore Fitz Randolph	John Insley Blair
Party	Democratic	Republican
Popular vote	83,955	79,333
Percentage	51.42%	48.58%
- County results Randolph: 50–60% 60–70% Blair: 50–60% 60–70%
Governor before election
Marcus Lawrence Ward
Republican
Elected Governor
Theodore Fitz Randolph
Democratic

The 1868 New Jersey gubernatorial election was held on November 3, 1868. Democratic nominee Theodore Fitz Randolph defeated Republican nominee John Insley Blair with 51.42% of the vote.

== General election ==
=== Candidates ===
- Theodore Fitz Randolph, former State Senator for Hudson County (Democratic)
- John Insley Blair, multimillionaire railroad magnate (Republican)

=== Results ===
New Jersey gubernatorial election, 1868
Party	Candidate	Votes	%	±%
Democratic	Theodore Fitz Randolph	83,955	51.42%	▲2.49
Republican	John Insley Blair	79,333	48.58%	▼2.49
Total votes		163,288		
Democratic gain from Republican		Swing		
