= Frederick H. Teese =

American politician (1823–1894)

Frederick Halstead Teese
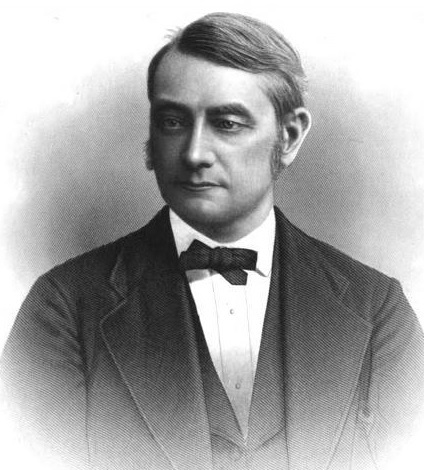

Member of the U.S. House of Representatives from New Jersey's 6th district
- In office March 4, 1875 – March 3, 1877
- Preceded by: Marcus Lawrence Ward
- Succeeded by: Thomas Baldwin Peddie

Member of the New Jersey Assembly
- In office 1860–1861

Personal details
- Born: October 21, 1823 Newark, New Jersey
- Died: January 7, 1894 (aged 70) New York City, New York
- Resting place: Mount Pleasant Cemetery, Newark, New Jersey
- Party: Democratic

Frederick Halstead Teese (October 21, 1823 – January 7, 1894) was an American lawyer and politician who served one term as a U.S. representative from New Jersey from 1875 to 1877.

== Biography ==
Born in Newark, New Jersey, Teese graduated from Princeton University on October 21, 1843. He studied law with attorney Asa Whitehead, was admitted to the bar in 1846, and commenced practice in Newark, New Jersey.

=== State assembly ===
Teese served in the New Jersey State Assembly in 1860 and 1861, and was Speaker in 1861. He was the presiding judge of the Essex County Court of Common Pleas from 1864 until his resignation in 1872.

=== Congress ===
In 1874, Teese was elected as a Democrat to the Forty-fourth Congress (March 4, 1875 – March 3, 1877). He declined the nomination for reelection in 1876, resumed the practice of law.

=== Death and burial ===
He died in New York City January 7, 1894, and was interred in Mount Pleasant Cemetery, Newark, New Jersey.

== Family ==
In 1856, Teese married Ann Caroline Darcy. They were the parents of two daughters, Mary and Catharine.

== Sources ==
=== Magazines ===
- Keasbey, Edward Q.; Borgmeyer, Charles L. (January 15, 1894). "Obituary Notice, Frederick H. Teese". The New Jersey Law Journal. Vol. 17. Plainfield, NJ: New Jersey Law Journal Publishing Company. pp. 62–63.

=== Books ===
- American Bar Association (1894). American Bar Association Annual Report: Including Proceedings of the Annual Meeting. Vol. 17. Philadelphia, PA: Dando Printing and Publishing Company. pp. 514–515.
- Canfield, Frederick A. (1897). A History of Thomas Canfield and of Matthew Camfield, with a Genealogy of their Descendants in New Jersey. New Haven, CT: Tuttle, Morehouse & Taylor Press. p. 188.

=== Newspapers ===
- "Death notice, Frederick Halstead Teese". New York Times. New York, NY. January 9, 1894. p. 5.

U.S. House of Representatives
Preceded by Marcus Lawrence Ward	U.S. House of Representatives; New Jersey's 6th congressional district March 4, 1875-March 3, 1877	Succeeded by Thomas B. Peddie
