= Joseph D. Bedle =

American judge

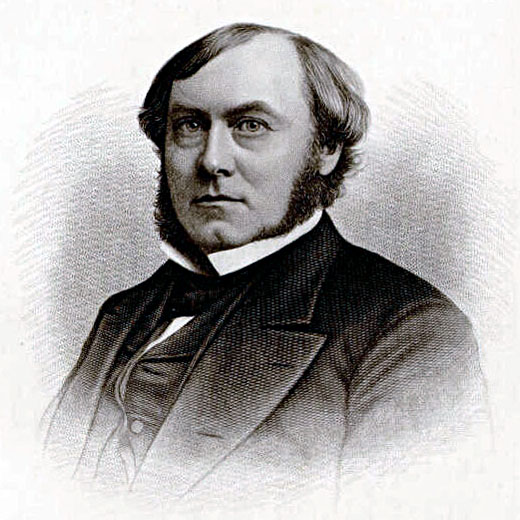

23rd Governor of New Jersey
- In office January 19, 1875 – January 15, 1878
- Preceded by: Joel Parker
- Succeeded by: George B. McClellan

Associate Justice of the New Jersey Supreme Court
- In office 1865–1875
- Appointed by: Joel Parker

Personal details
- Born: January 5, 1831 Matawan, New Jersey, U.S.
- Died: October 21, 1894 (aged 63) New York City, U.S.
- Party: Democratic

Joseph Dorsett Bedle, Sr. (January 5, 1831 – October 21, 1894) was an American attorney, jurist, and Democratic Party politician who served as the 23rd governor of New Jersey from 1875 to 1878.

== Early life ==
Joseph Dorsett Bedle was born in Middletown Point, New Jersey (now known as Matawan), on January 5, 1831, to Thomas and Hannah (née Dorsett) Bedle. His father was a merchant, justice of the peace, and judge of the Monmouth County Court of Common Pleas. Through his mother, Joseph Bedle was related to Garret D. Wall, a former U.S. Senator.

Bedle was educated at a local academy, Middletown Point Academy (later called the Glenwood Institute, but did not attend college due to his delicate health, instead working in a general store. He had a strong desire to study law, and studied in the law offices of William L. Dayton in Trenton for roughly three years before attending State and National Law School in Ballston Spa, New York, for a winter and spending another winter in the Poughkeepsie, New York, offices of Thompson and Weeks.

Bedle was admitted to the bar in New York on his twenty-first birthday, January 5, 1852. He was admitted to the New Jersey bar in 1853 after further study under Matawan lawyer Henry S. Little. For the next two years, he practiced law in Middletown Point before moving to Freehold in 1856.

== New Jersey Supreme Court ==
In 1865, Bedle was appointed by Governor Joel Parker to the State Supreme Court (an intermediary court subordinate to the appellate New Jersey Court of Errors and Appeals) on the Hudson-Passaic-Bergen circuit. At only 34 years old, he was the second-youngest justice in the court's history.

Soon after his appointment, he relocated to Jersey City, where he lived next door to future two-term Governor Leon Abbett. In 1871, Bedle was mentioned as the favorite candidate for the Democratic nomination for Governor, but Abbett persuaded Governor Parker to run for a second non-consecutive term. After Parker's victory, Bedle was appointed to a second term on the bench.

While serving on the court, Bedle was a delegate to 1864 Democratic National Convention.

== Governor of New Jersey ==
=== 1874 campaign ===
In 1874, Bedle was the unanimous choice of the Democratic Party convention for Governor. He faced Republican former U.S. Representative George A. Halsey of Newark. A major issue in the campaign was the government of Jersey City. Halsey campaigned to reform the system of state legislative commissions that governed city affairs. As justice, Bedle had given fervent charges to a grand jury that led to the indictment for fraud and conspiracy of the Republican city commissioners; he later tried and sentenced them.

Bedle won the election by a relatively large margin, possibly stemming from the Panic of 1873, which had made national Republicans and elected politicians generally unpopular.

=== Term in office ===
In his inaugural address, Bedle called for economic thrift, home rule for municipalities, and general legislation regulating corporations (as opposed to individual charters). Bedle argued that devolution of responsibility to the municipalities, which were the primary sources of spending and taxation, would tend to reduce both. Though he hoped for the day "when every city in this State, of a certain population, will be governed by one general law," he acknowledged that this would require a constitutional amendment.

Governor Bedle's first veto killed a bill to incorporate a Newark manufacturing and trading company on the grounds that this was special legislation. He vetoed at least five similar bills for manufacturing corporations and two for fraternal lodges in his first year in office. Special legislation was restricted by a state constitutional amendment ratified by the voters in November 1875. As a result of the restriction on special legislation, activity declined precipitously and Bedle's remaining two years in office were some of the least eventful, legislatively, in New Jersey's history.

In his second year in office, Bedle declared his interpretation that the restrictive amendment did not apply to all municipal law. However, he vetoed a bill in spring 1876 that would have regulated local elections in Jersey City. He vetoed two more bills that were narrowly written to affect only Newark, though only because these were not passed with proper public notice.

In 1876, Bedle vetoed a bill which would "provide for the maintenance and education of the deaf and dumb, feeble-minded, and blind persons in [New Jersey]" on the grounds that the policy was too radical and not compliant with the Constitutional provision limiting bills to one subject. Though the New Jersey Senate voted to override his veto, six Assembly Republicans crossed party lines to prevent the bill's passage. However, the Republican legislature did overcome Bedle's veto to pass a prison reform bill which Bedle argued would create statutory officers too powerful to be chosen without constitutional advice and consent processes.

During his final year in office, Bedle appointed his father-in-law, Bennington F. Randolph, to one of two new Jersey City judgeships, but the Democratic Senate rejected a Republican Bedle nominated for the other seat. Bedle appointed another Republican, also rejected, before dismissing the Senate and appointing the Republican ad interim.

During a railroad strike in 1877, Bedle called up the state National Guard to protect the trains and replacement crews.

=== Post-governorship ===
After leaving office, Bedle returned to the private practice of law and served as legal counsel for the Delaware, Lackawanna and Western Railroad. He joined the board of directors of many prominent corporations. He declined three appointments to judgeships and presidential nominations as minister to Russia and Austria.

In the last year of his life, Bedle served on the New Jersey Constitutional Commission of 1894.

== Personal life ==
He married Althea Fitz Randolph (c. 1830 – 1926), the daughter of a local lawyer and niece of future New Jersey Governor Theodore Fitz Randolph, in 1861. They had four sons, Joseph Dorsett Bedle, Jr. (1864–1917), Bennington Fitz Randolph Bedle (1862–1917), Thomas Francis Bedle (1865–1922), and Randolph Bedle (1875–1880), and two daughters, Mary Howell Bedle (1873–1880) and Althea Fitz Randolph Bedle (1871–1957).

Bedle was an Honorary Member of the Society of the Cincinnati.

== Death and legacy ==
Bedle died at St. Luke's Hospital in New York City on October 21, 1894, from complications from surgery for bladder stones. He was buried at Maplewood Cemetery in Freehold Township.

== See also ==
- List of governors of New Jersey

Political offices
Preceded by Joel Parker	Governor of New Jersey; January 19, 1875 – January 15, 1878	Succeeded by George B. McClellan
Party political offices
Preceded by Joel Parker	Democratic Nominee for Governor of New Jersey; 1874	Succeeded by George B. McClellan
