= Cornelius Walsh =

Cornelius Walsh may refer to:

- Cornelius Walsh (politician) (1817–1879), New Jersey politician
- Con Walsh (1885–1961), Irish Canadian athlete
- Connie Walsh (1882–1953), Major League Baseball pitcher
