= Thomas B. Peddie =

American politician

Thomas Baldwin Peddie
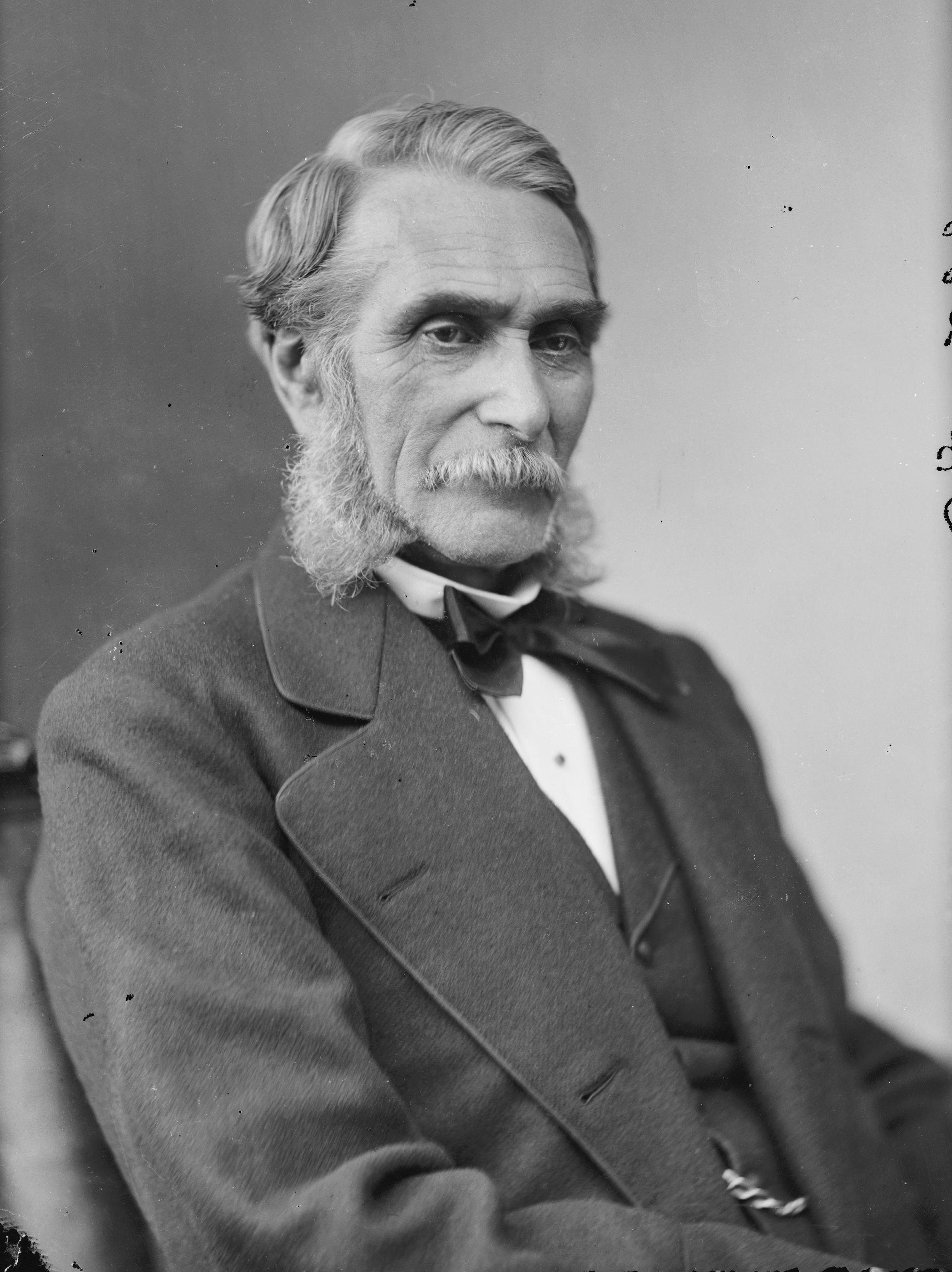

Member of the U.S. House of Representatives from New Jersey's 6th district
- In office March 4, 1877 – March 3, 1879
- Preceded by: Frederick Halstead Teese
- Succeeded by: John L. Blake

14th Mayors of Newark
- In office 1866–1870
- Preceded by: Theodore Runyon
- Succeeded by: Frederick William Ricord

Personal details
- Born: February 11, 1808 Edinburgh, Scotland, U.K.
- Died: February 16, 1889 (aged 81) Newark, New Jersey, U.S.
- Party: Republican

Thomas Baldwin Peddie (February 11, 1808 – February 16, 1889) was an American Republican politician who represented New Jersey's 6th congressional district in the United States House of Representatives from 1877 to 1879. Earlier he was a member of the New Jersey General Assembly from 1864 to 1865 and the mayor of Newark, New Jersey, from 1866 to 1869.

== Birth ==
He was born on February 11, 1808, in Edinburgh, Scotland. His father was a Baptist exhorter, working at trunk-making during the week and preaching on Sundays. The elder Peddie died in 1832, leaving his wife and six children in moderate financial circumstances and whose support then depended mainly upon Thomas. Seeing little chance in Scotland of earning a living for so many dependent ones, and hearing of America as the land of opportunity, he emigrated in 1833; after studying the advantages offered by several towns, he concluded to make Newark, New Jersey, his home. For two years he worked at the bench in a saddlery establishment and then, in a basement on Broad Street in Newark, began to manufacture trunks, not having, as he said, enough money to pay for the iron on his first trunk. When he died, his factory and warehouses covered nearly a block, his employees were numbered in the hundreds, and his name stood at the head of this branch of industry in the United States.

== Public affairs ==
In addition to his public service described earlier, Peddie helped to found the Essex National Bank and was its vice president; he founded the Security Savings Bank and was its only president; he was president of the Board of Trade; manager of various city institutions; and director of insurance companies and charitable organizations.

The money for the Newark First Baptist Church was given by Peddie. H. J. Latham wrote:

He said to me, Now, don't mention my name in this service, but pass me by. After the service was over, we walked down Broad Street together, and he said to me, I don't think that you or any of the others quite understand me in this gift. How so? I asked. He replied, Think of it, I came to this city a poor young man. See where I am now! Look at my happy home! Think how many friends I have. Everything I've touched has seemed to prosper. Now, I believe that all this prosperity has come to me from God, and I owe all my religious convictions to the fellowship I have enjoyed all these years in the First Baptist Church. Then pausing and turning abruptly to me he said with great emphasis, I am building this church simply to express my gratitude to God.

== U.S. Patent ==
"This invention has for its object to improve the construction of trunks, valises, portmanteaus, pellesiers, traveling bags, etc., so as to adapt them to receive and carry a portfolio in such a way that while carrying it safely, it may be conveniently removed when required for use." U.S. patent 98,104 (1870).

== Death ==
He died in Newark on February 16, 1889, and is buried in Mount Pleasant Cemetery in Newark.

== Legacy ==
The Peddie School in Hightstown, where he was a generous benefactor, and the Peddie Memorial Baptist Church in Newark are named after him.

== See also ==
- List of mayors of Newark, New Jersey

Political offices
Preceded by Theodore Runyon	Mayor of Newark, New Jersey; 1866–1869	Succeeded by Frederick W. Ricord
U.S. House of Representatives
Preceded by Frederick H. Teese	U.S. Representative, New Jersey 6th district 1877–1879	Succeeded by John L. Blake
