= Marcus Lawrence Ward =

American politician (1812–1884)

Marcus Ward
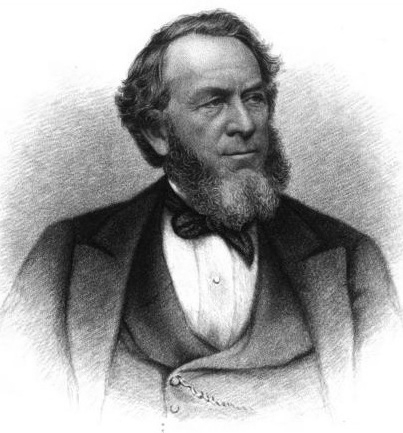
- Ward c. 1859

Member of the U.S. House of Representatives from New Jersey's 6th district
- In office March 4, 1873 – March 4, 1875
- Preceded by: Constituency established
- Succeeded by: Frederick Teese

Chair of the Republican National Committee
- In office September 3, 1866 – May 21, 1868
- Preceded by: Henry Raymond
- Succeeded by: William Claflin

21st Governor of New Jersey
- In office January 16, 1866 – January 19, 1869
- Preceded by: Joel Parker
- Succeeded by: Theodore Randolph

Personal details
- Born: Marcus Lawrence Ward; November 9, 1812 Newark, New Jersey, U.S.
- Died: April 25, 1884 (aged 71) Newark, New Jersey, U.S.
- Resting place: Mount Pleasant Cemetery
- Party: Republican
- Spouse: Susan Longworth Morris (1840–1884)
- Children: 8

Marcus Lawrence Ward (November 9, 1812 – April 25, 1884) was an American Republican Party politician, who served as the 21st governor of New Jersey from 1866 to 1869 and represented Essex County for one term from 1873 to 1875.

== Early life ==
Marcus Lawrence Ward was born in Newark, New Jersey, on November 9, 1812, to Moses and Fanny (née Brown) Ward. His father Moses was a prosperous candle manufacturer and a descendant of John Ward, one of the founders of the city of Newark in 1666.

He attended Newark's public schools and then joined his family's soap and candle making business. The business was operated by Ward's father and uncle, and Ward eventually became a partner. He was also active in other businesses, including serving as a director of the National State Bank and secretary of the Lawrence Cement and Manufacturing Company.

By the 1840s, Ward's business success enabled him to concentrate much of his time and effort on civic causes and philanthropy. He was chairman of the executive committee of the New Jersey Historical Society, director of the National State Bank, and a founder of both the Newark Library Association and the New Jersey Art Union.

== Civil War ==
By 1856, Ward became interested in the growing movement for the abolition of slavery, which led him to become involved in the new national Republican Party.

In 1858, he traveled west to Kansas, a figurative and literal battleground between pro- and anti-slavery forces, to support the free-state cause. He soon returned to Newark, joined the Republican Party because of its anti-slavery stance, and became involved in local Newark politics. He was a delegate to the 1860 Republican National Convention.

During the American Civil War, Ward became identified prominently with the Union cause, primarily as a philanthropic advocate for those serving in uniform. Ward devised and managed one of the first systems in New Jersey for enabling soldiers to set aside monthly allotments of their pay for delivery to their families and gained the nickname "the soldiers' friend." He invested personal funds to create a wartime hospital for convalescing service members, and later helped establish a soldiers' home for wounded and disabled veterans. Ward soon created an office devoted to aiding veterans, which assisted them in procuring pensions, medical care, and other benefits.

Later in his career, Democratic critics and opponents would accuse Ward of making personal profit through his management of soldiers' pay, which Ward and Republicans denied.

== Governor of New Jersey ==
=== 1862 election ===
On the strength of his personal popularity and bipartisan support for his philanthropy, Ward was nominated on the National Union Party ticket for Governor in 1862, but he lost to Democrat Joel Parker. Soldiers serving in the field were unable to vote in the election, which may have cost Ward votes. Opposition to emancipation in the state may have also boosted Parker's support.

During the 1864 presidential election, Ward was chairman and treasurer of the National Union Party in New Jersey.

=== 1865 election ===
In the post-war environment, the atmosphere was ripe for a Republican victory. Ward stood for the Republican nomination as the representative of Newark, East Jersey, and veterans. He was opposed by Alexander G. Cattell, a wealthy grain merchant who had only recently returned to the state. At the 1865 Republican nominating convention in Trenton, there was a deadlock between the two candidates that refused to break. One strategy involved delegates working to convince influential General Hugh Judson Kilpatrick to give his support, but he refused. It was finally broken on the fourth ballot after a collection of civil war veteran delegates voted to hand the nomination to Ward. George M. Robeson, the leader of the Cattell campaign, made the nomination unanimous. In the general election, Ward defeated Theodore Runyon by a large margin bolstered by the veterans' vote.

=== Term in office ===
Ward served as Governor from 1866 to 1869. His administration was marked by active support for and involvement in the federal Reconstruction process, a marked contrast from his predecessor Joel Parker. Though the Thirteenth Amendment to the United States Constitution had been ratified without New Jersey's vote, Ward made it a priority to symbolically ratify the amendment and "redeem" the state. He also led the state in ratifying the Fourteenth Amendment.

On purely state affairs, Ward was convinced that active, energetic government could produce wise social and economic policies. His administration focused on reforming the state prison, establishing a state reform school, funding public education and instituting a statewide uniform health code. He also called for state action in riparian water rights, asking that owners of underwater land compensate the state for the right to build improvements.

Ward's governorship was marked by division within the Republican Party, leading to the downfall of the party in the state. In an effort to stave off criticism from Cattell, he appointed George Robeson Attorney General and attempted to steer a middle course, but was criticized for favoring Newark Republicans, such as in his appointment of Frederick T. Frelinghuysen to the U.S. Senate. In his early days in office, Ward confidently predicted New Jersey was now "firmly fixed among the Republican states," but the state would not elect another Republican governor until 1895.

While in office, Ward also served as chairman of the Republican National Committee from 1866 to 1868. In 1868, Ward became the first president of the Newark Industrial Exhibition.

== Later career ==
After leaving the governor's office, Ward resumed his business and civic interests. In 1872, he was a successful candidate for Congress representing Essex County (numbered the 6th district). He served one term, 1873 to 1875, but was defeated for reelection in 1874 by Democrat Frederick H. Teese.

After leaving Congress in 1875, Ward devoted the rest of his life to his family and personal affairs.

== Personal life ==
In 1840, Ward married Susan Longworth Morris, a relative of Nicholas Longworth. The Wards had eight children, though only two lived to adulthood:

- Joseph Morris (1841–1911)
- Elizabeth Morris (1843–1848)
- Frances Lavinia (1844–1846)
- Marcus L. Ward Jr. (1847–1920)
- Catharine Almira Morris (1849–1860)
- Nicholas Longworth (1852–1857)
- John Longworth Morris (1854–1855)
- Frances Brown (1856–1864)

== Death and legacy ==
Ward contracted malaria while on a trip to Florida in early 1884. He returned home, but did not recover. Ward died in Newark on April 25, 1884, and was buried at Mount Pleasant Cemetery.

=== Legacy ===
After Ward's death, his son Marcus used part of the family fortune to found the Ward Homestead, a home for elderly bachelors and widowers. The site is now part of a larger retirement complex known as Winchester Gardens.

In 1941, the Schoolmen's Club of Newark and the Newark Museum dedicated a memorial plaque to Ward in the Alice Ransom Dreyfuss Memorial Garden behind the Newark Museum. The museum was built on the site of Ward's former home.

== Sources ==
=== Books ===
- Platt, Herman K. (1982). Stellhorn, Paul A.; Birknet, Michael J. (eds.). Biographical Essay of Marcus Lawrence Ward in The Governors of New Jersey, 1664-1974 (PDF). Trenton, NJ: New Jersey Historical Commission. Archived from the original (PDF) on August 12, 2011.
- U.S. Congress (2005). Biographical Directory of the United States Congress, 1774-2005. Washington, DC: US Government Printing Office. ISBN 978-0-16-073176-1.

=== Internet ===
- "Historic Jewel: The History of Our Stunning Continuing Care Retirement Community in Maplewood, NJ". Winchester Gardens. Maplewood, NJ: Springpoint Senior Living.
- "Marcus Ward Dedicatory Exercises, Newark Museum Garden – May 16, 1941". Newark's Attic. Newark, NJ. July 25, 2015.
- "Collection Description, Marcus L. Ward Papers". Newark Archives Project. Newark, NJ: Newark History Society and Rutgers University-Newark.

=== Newspapers ===
- "The Elections Yesterday: New Jersey". Sacramento Daily Union. Sacramento, CA. November 4, 1874 – via California Digital Newspaper Collection.

Party political offices
Preceded by Charles Olden	Republican nominee for Governor of New Jersey; 1862, 1865	Succeeded by John Blair
Preceded by Henry Raymond	Chair of the Republican National Committee; 1866–1868	Succeeded by William Claflin
Political offices
Preceded by Joel Parker	Governor of New Jersey; 1866–1869	Succeeded by Theodore Randolph
U.S. House of Representatives
New constituency	Member of the U.S. House of Representatives from New Jersey's 6th congressional district 1873–1875	Succeeded by Frederick Teese
