= Ward Homestead =

Coordinates: 40.728252°N 74.255147°W

- Interactive map of the Ward Homestead area

General information
- Location: Maplewood, New Jersey, United States
- Construction started: 1926
- Completed: 1927
- Cost: $1.5 million
- Client: Marcus L. Ward Home

Design and construction
- Architect: John Russell Pope

Ward Homestead is a notable landmark located in Maplewood, New Jersey, because it is the combined work of three great 20th century figures, architect John Russell Pope and landscape designers, the Olmsted Brothers.

== Marcus L. Ward Home ==
Ward Homestead was established as the Marcus L. Ward Home for Aged and Respectable Bachelors and Widowers in 1922 upon the death of Marcus L. Ward. Son of Marcus Lawrence Ward, one time New Jersey Senator and Governor, Ward died with a substantial fortune of over $4,887,517.40 of which the vast majority went to the newly created home.

== John Russell Pope ==
After a site was selected in Maplewood, New Jersey, John Russell Pope was selected as the architect. The original three interconnected structures were built in a rusticated gothic style of stone and slate. Through careful investment of the original bequeathment, the Ward Home was constructed for $1,750,000 with over $5,000,000 still remaining in the bank. The home opened on August 31, 1927.

== Ward Home today ==
The Ward Home foundation still exists in its original form. In the 1980s, women were finally admitted to the home. In the 1990s, a large expansion added numerous apartments and villas in an incongruous style to what were vast lawns, putting greens, and ancient trees. Currently called Winchester Gardens, the original Pope-designed portion of the home still features prominently in its advertising.
