= 1862 New Jersey gubernatorial election =

- November 4, 1862
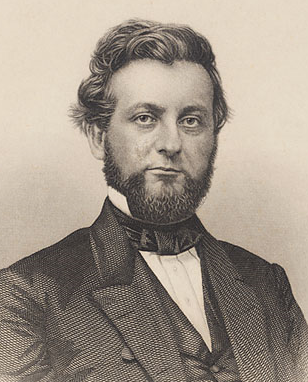

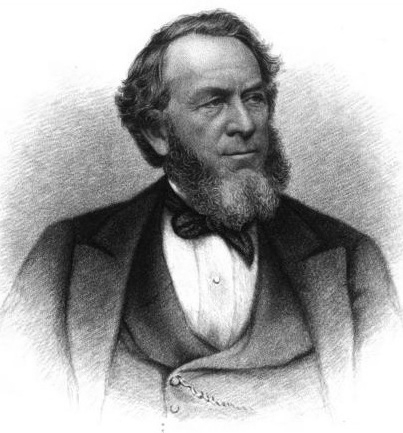
Nominee	Joel Parker	Marcus Lawrence Ward
Party	Democratic	National Union
Popular vote	61,307	46,710
Percentage	56.76%	43.24%
- County results Parker: 50–60% 60–70% 70–80% Ward: 50–60% 60–70%
Governor before election
Charles Smith Olden
Republican
Elected Governor
Joel Parker
Democratic

The 1862 New Jersey gubernatorial election was held on November 4, 1862. Democratic nominee Joel Parker defeated National Union nominee Marcus Lawrence Ward with 56.8% of the vote.

== General election ==
=== Candidates ===
- Joel Parker, Democratic
- Marcus Lawrence Ward, National Union

=== Results ===
1862 New Jersey gubernatorial election
Party	Candidate	Votes	%	±%
Democratic	Joel Parker	61,307	56.76%	
National Union	Marcus Lawrence Ward	46,710	43.24%	
Majority				
Turnout				
Democratic gain from Republican		Swing		
