= William H. Vredenburgh =

American judge (1840–1920)

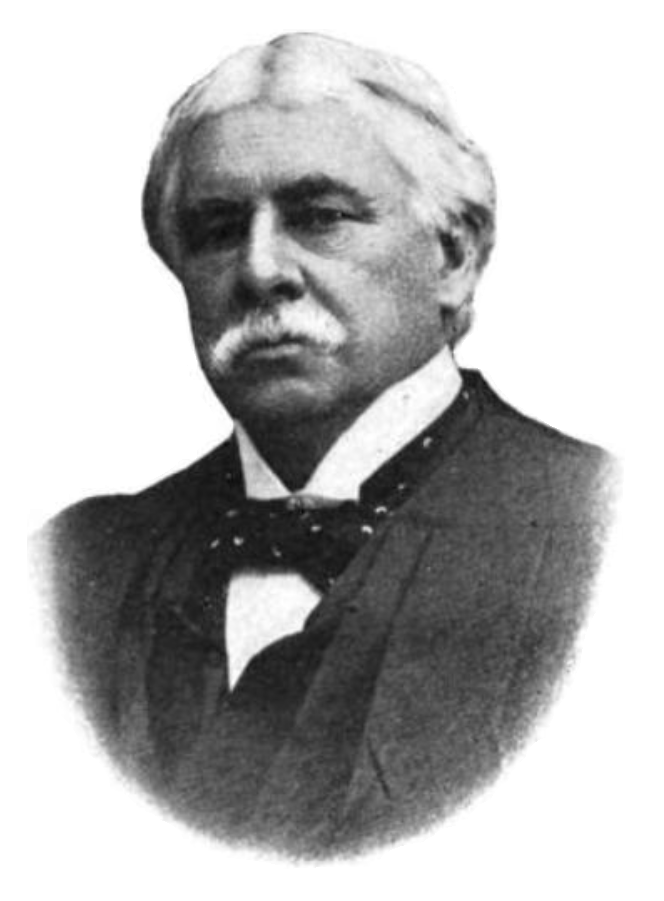
New Jersey Supreme Court Justice William H. Vredenburgh

William H. Vredenburgh (August 19, 1840 – May 15, 1920) was a New Jersey attorney and public figure who served for nearly twenty years as a judge of the New Jersey Court of Errors and Appeals.

== Early life, education, and career ==
Born in Freehold Township, New Jersey, Vredenburgh was the second son of Supreme Court Justice Peter Vredenburgh and Eleanor Brinkerhoff. His older brother was Major Peter Vredenburgh Jr.

He received an A.M. from Rutgers College in 1859, where he was a member of the Rutgers Chapter of the Zeta Psi Fraternity. He attended Harvard Law School from 1861 to 1862, also studying law in the office of Joseph D. Bedle, who was afterwards governor of New Jersey. Graduating from Harvard in 1862, Vredenburgh was admitted to the practice of law as an attorney in June of that year, and as a counsellor in June 1865, thereafter practicing in Freehold with few interruptions. In 1865, he entered into partnership with Philip J. Ryall, an association which lasted five years, ending due to Ryall's failing health. In 1882, Vredenburgh formed a partnership with the Frederick Parker, over the course of which Vredenburgh "was engaged in many important cases". During this time, Vredenburgh "took an important part" in the case of Williams v. Vreeland, the first case in which a New Jersey court added to a will a legacy not mentioned in it on the strength of a parol declaration of a trust by a testator. Vredenburgh was noted "for close reasoning and brilliant pleading" in the case.

In 1884 Vredenburgh was nominated by the Republicans of Monmouth County, New Jersey, as their candidate for the state senate. On the eve of the election, the opposing parties effected a fusion, resulting in Vredenburgh's defeat. He was thereafter appointed Advisory Master in Chancery, and in 1894 was elected president of the First National Bank of Freehold. He was appointed by Governor Griggs to a committee for recommending methods of tax equalization to the legislature. He also served as a trustee of the Monmouth County Bar Association, Rutgers College, the Historical Society of New Jersey, the Society of the Cincinnati, and the Holland Society of New York. In 1897, he was appointed to a special commission to revise the railroad taxation laws.

== Judicial service ==
In November 1897, he was nominated by Governor John W. Griggs, and confirmed by the Senate, as one of the specially appointed Judges of the Court of Errors and Appeals, to fill a vacancy caused by the death of Judge Dayton. On January 12, 1898, he was nominated for a full term of six years by the same Governor, and was confirmed by the Senate six days later. On January 18, 1904, he was appointed by Governor Franklin Murphy for another term, the Senate confirming on 25 January. In 1910 he was renominated by Governor John Franklin Fort and confirmed for another term.

== Personal life and death ==
On February 25, 1868, he was married to Bessie Hartshorne Williams, daughter of Esek Hartshorne Williams and Amelia L. Williams. They had two sons and two daughters.

Vredenburgh died suddenly of heart disease at his home in Freehold, at nearly eighty years old. He was buried in Maplewood Cemetery. At the time of his death, he was the oldest living graduate of Rutgers College.
