= Vredenburg (disambiguation) =

Vredenburg is a town in South Africa.

Vredenburg may also refer to:

- Vredenburg (castle), castle in Utrecht, Netherlands
- Muziekcentrum Vredenburg, a music venue in Utrecht, designed by Herman Hertzberger; mostly demolished in 2008
- TivoliVredenburg, music venue in Utrecht, Netherlands
- Harrie Vredenburg (b. 1952), Canadian academic
- Van Vredenburg Farm, historic house in Dutchess County, New York

== See also ==
- Vredenburgh (disambiguation)
