= Maplewood Cemetery, Freehold, New Jersey =

Cemetery in Monmouth County, New Jersey, US

Coordinates: 40°15′08″N 74°17′22″W

Maplewood Cemetery is a cemetery in Freehold Township, in Monmouth County, New Jersey. It was established in the late 1800s.

== Notable interments ==
- Joseph D. Bedle (1821–1894), Governor of New Jersey from 1875 to 1878
- Stanley Dancer (1927–2005), Harness racing trainer and driver
- Charles Haight (1838–1891), United States Congressman who represented New Jersey's 2nd congressional district from 1867 to 1871
- Joel Parker (1816–1888), Governor of New Jersey from 1863 to 1866 and from 1871 to 1874
- Daniel Bailey Ryall (1789–1864), United States Representative from New Jersey, in office from 1839 to 1841
- William H. Vredenburgh (1840–1920), Judge of the New Jersey Court of Errors and Appeals
