= Cornelius Walsh (politician) =

American politician

Cornelius Walsh (1817 – September 20, 1879) was an American Republican Party politician and trunk manufacturer from New Jersey.

Walsh was born in England and emigrated to the United States with his parents as a child. He went to work at an early age, serving as an apprentice in a silver-plating business in Newark, New Jersey. He married Sarah Brown of Belleville and worked as a journeyman in Paterson.

Returning to Newark, he and his brother-in-law, William Brown, formed a partnership to manufacture trunk rivets. Walsh continued the enterprise alone and expanded his trunk business until he had a large factory with 200 employees.

He became involved in state politics, and in 1871 became a candidate for the United States Senate, opposing Cortlandt Parker and Frederick Theodore Frelinghuysen for the Republican Party nomination. Despite Walsh's foreign birth, his wealth made him a formidable challenger. He bowed out of the race with the promise that he would be nominated for Governor of New Jersey later that same year. Frelinghuysen went on to win the nomination and the Senate seat.

In the 1871 gubernatorial race, Walsh faced the Democratic candidate, Joel Parker, who had previously served a term as governor from 1863 to 1866. Parker defeated Walsh by a margin of six thousand votes.

Walsh's defeat led to a decline in his business fortunes, and he lost most of his previous wealth. He died in 1879 at his home in Newark.

Party political offices
Preceded by John Insley Blair	Republican Nominee for Governor of New Jersey; 1871	Succeeded by George A. Halsey
