= Edwin F. Uhl =

American diplomat (1841–1901)

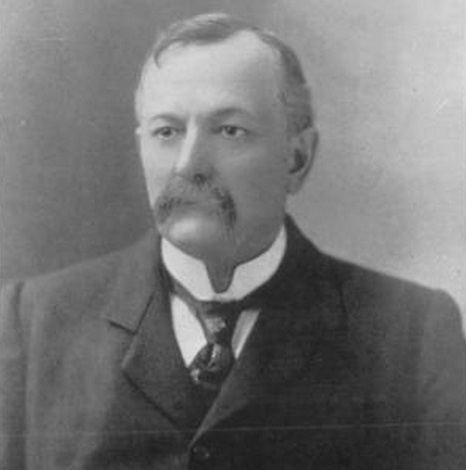

23rd United States Ambassador to Germany
- In office May 3, 1896 – June 8, 1897
- President: Grover Cleveland; William McKinley
- Preceded by: Theodore Runyon
- Succeeded by: Andrew Dickson White

United States Assistant Secretary of State
- In office November 11, 1893 – February 11, 1896
- President: Grover Cleveland
- Preceded by: William Woodville Rockhill
- Succeeded by: Josiah Quincy

Acting United States Secretary of State
- In office May 28, 1895 – June 9, 1895
- President: Grover Cleveland
- Preceded by: Richard Olney
- Succeeded by: Walter Q. Gresham

Mayor of Grand Rapids
- In office 1890–1891
- Preceded by: William J. Stuart
- Succeeded by: John Killean

Personal details
- Born: Edwin Fuller Uhl; August 14, 1841 Rush, New York, U.S.
- Died: May 17, 1901 (aged 59) Grand Rapids, Michigan, U.S.
- Party: Democratic
- Spouse: Alice Follett (m. 1865)
- Parent(s): David M. Uhl; Catherine De Garmo
- Education: University of Michigan

Edwin Fuller Uhl (August 14, 1841 – May 17, 1901) was a prominent Michigan lawyer and politician. He served as Mayor of Grand Rapids, Michigan, Ambassador to Germany and United States Assistant Secretary of State.

== Biography ==
Uhl was born in the township of Rush, New York, the son of David M. and Catherine (De Garmo) Uhl. The family moved to a farm near Ypsilanti, Michigan, in 1844. Uhl graduated from the University of Michigan in 1862 and received an M.A. degree from the same institution in 1863. He then studied law, gaining admission to the Michigan bar in January 1864, and began practice. He would practice law alone and in partnerships for the next thirty years.

On May 1, 1865, Uhl married Alice Follett, the daughter of Benjamin Follett, a prominent citizen and onetime mayor of Ypsilanti. They had four children: Lucy Follett, David Edwin, Alice Edwina and Marshall Mortimer.

In 1870 Uhl was elected Prosecuting Attorney of Washtenaw County and served in that office for two years. In 1876 the Uhl family moved to Grand Rapids. In 1881 he became president of the Grand Rapids National Bank; he remained in that position until 1893, then returned to it in 1897. At one time he served as President of the Bar Association of Grand Rapids. In 1890 he was elected Mayor of Grand Rapids, serving two years.

In 1893 Uhl was appointed Assistant Secretary of State and moved to Washington, D.C. From May 28 to June 9, 1895, he served as Acting Secretary of State by appointment of President Cleveland. In 1895 the federal government appointed him to inspect US consular offices throughout Europe and in 1896 he was appointed Ambassador to Germany, a post he held until 1897, when the Cleveland administration and its appointees were replaced. He returned to Grand Rapids and resumed his career there until his death four years later.

He is buried in Highland Cemetery in Ypsilanti, Michigan.

Political offices
Preceded by John Killean	Mayor of Grand Rapids; 1890–1891	Succeeded by William J. Stuart
Preceded by Josiah Quincy	United States Assistant Secretary of State; 1893–1896	Succeeded by William Woodville Rockhill
Preceded by Walter Q. Gresham	United States Secretary of State; Ad interim 1895	Succeeded by Richard Olney
Preceded by Theodore Runyon	United States Ambassador to Germany; 1896–1897	Succeeded by Andrew Dickson White
