= Jean Baptiste Ricord =

French-American physician

Jean Baptiste Ricord (born in Paris, France, in 1777; died on the island of Guadeloupe, West Indies, in 1837) was a French-American medical doctor.

== Biography ==
He was educated in France and in Italy, whither his father had fled during the French Revolution, and subsequently accompanied his father to the United States, where they settled in Baltimore, Maryland. After graduating from the New York College of Physicians and Surgeons in 1810, he went to the West Indies to make researches into botany and natural history, and traveled and practised medicine extensively in the islands until he returned to New York. He was an accomplished scholar, musician, and painter, and a member of various learned societies in France and the United States.

== Writings ==
Many of his writings were signed "Madiana," the name of his homestead in France. In addition to contributions to scientific and other journals, Ricord published:

- An Improved French Grammar (New York, 1812)
- Recherches et expériences sur les poisons d'Amérique, illustrated by his own pencil (Research and observations on the poisons of the Americas, Bordeaux, 1826).

He left many manuscripts that have not been published.

This is a colonial medical text on illnesses common to Afro-Caribbean enslaved plantation laborers, but it is also a text mutually interested in poisoning and illnesses resembling poisoning.

== Family ==
He married Elizabeth Stryker in 1810. She accompanied him in his expeditions to the West Indies, and was a noted educator. Their son Frederick William Ricord was a New Jersey politician and author. Another son, John Ricord, was a lawyer and traveler. Jean Baptiste's brother Alexander Ricord (born in Baltimore in 1798; died in Paris 3 October 1876) was also a physician. He was educated in Baltimore, moved to France in order to study under Cuvier, and received his diploma as doctor in medicine in Paris in 1824. He was an assistant surgeon in the French Navy, and a correspondent of the Academy of Medicine, but devoted his life chiefly to natural history, received the decoration of the Legion of Honor in 1845, and contributed largely to scientific journals. Another brother, Philippe Ricord, was a noted French physician.
