= Theodore Runyon =

American soldier, politician, and diplomat

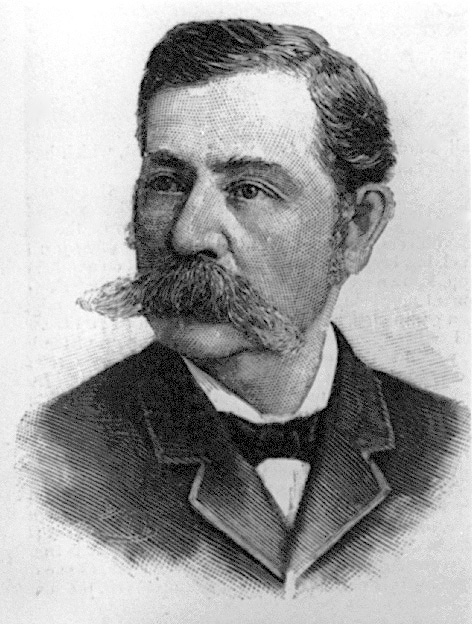
- Illustration in Harper's Weekly, 1891

1st United States Ambassador to Germany
- In office October 26, 1893 – January 27, 1896
- President: Grover Cleveland
- Preceded by: Himself as Minister
- Succeeded by: Edwin F. Uhl

United States Minister to Germany
- In office June 4, 1893 – October 26, 1893
- President: Grover Cleveland
- Preceded by: William Walter Phelps
- Succeeded by: Himself as Ambassador

Personal details
- Born: October 25, 1822 Somerville, New Jersey, U.S.
- Died: January 27, 1896 (aged 73) Berlin, Germany
- Resting place: Mount Pleasant Cemetery, Newark, New Jersey

Military service
- Allegiance: United States of America: Union
- Branch/service: United States Army; New Jersey Militia
- Years of service: 1857–1864; 1866–1873
- Rank: Major General
- Battles/wars: American Civil War; Battle of First Bull Run

Theodore Runyon (October 25, 1822 – January 27, 1896) was an American politician, diplomat, and American Civil War brigadier general in the New Jersey Militia, serving with the Union Army at the Battle of First Bull Run. Runyon was a lawyer before the Civil War and mayor of Newark, New Jersey, a major general in command of the New Jersey National Guard until 1873, first president of the Manufacturers' National Bank of Newark, chancellor of New Jersey for 14 years and, between 1893 and 1896, envoy and later ambassador to Germany.

== Early life ==
Theodore Runyon was born in Somerville, New Jersey of Huguenot descent. He was a direct descendant of Vincent Rongion (1644–1713), a Huguenot who was born in Poitiers, France and settled in New Jersey. Theodore Runyon graduated from Yale University, where he helped found Scroll and Key Society. Runyon was admitted to the New Jersey bar in 1846 and began the practice of law in Newark, New Jersey.

== Military service ==
As a brigadier general in the New Jersey militia, Runyon commanded the Fourth Division of the Army of Northeastern Virginia in June and July 1861. The division was composed of 90-day New Jersey volunteer regiments and new 3-year New Jersey volunteer regiments which had been organized for less than a month. Union Army commander, Major General Irvin McDowell held this division in reserve during the First Battle of Bull Run and they were not engaged in the battle.

Although the Historians John and David Eicher show Runyon in charge of the division and as mustered out of the volunteers on July 31, 1861, they do not show him with a formal Union Army commission. Also, neither the 1906 War Department list of Union Army generals nor Historian Ezra J. Warner's Generals in Blue show Runyon as a commissioned Union Army general rather than or in addition to a New Jersey militia general. Runyon held his position as division commander as a State militia or short-term volunteer general, not as a formally commissioned Union Army general. On February 25, 1862, Runyon was appointed a brevet major general in the New Jersey militia. After the war, he was elected a companion of the Pennsylvania Commandery of the Military Order of the Loyal Legion of the United States - a military society of officers of the Union armed forces and their descendants.

Fort Runyon, named in Theodore Runyon's honor, was a timber and earthwork fort constructed by the Union Army following the occupation of northern Virginia in order to defend the southern approaches to the Long Bridge as part of the defenses of Washington, D.C. during that war.

=== Later career ===
From 1864 to 1866, Runyon served as mayor of Newark as a Democrat. He had previously been city attorney and city counsel. Runyon was appointed major general in charge of the New Jersey National Guard, and served in this post until 1873. He was the first president of the Manufacturers' National Bank of Newark until he became chancellor of New Jersey, an office he held for 14 years.

In 1893, Runyon became envoy and later ambassador to Germany, where he died in 1896. He is buried at Mount Pleasant Cemetery in Newark, New Jersey.

== Notes ==
Political offices
Preceded by Moses Bigelow	Mayor of Newark, New Jersey; 1864–1866	Succeeded by Thomas Baldwin Peddie
Party political offices
Preceded by Joel Parker	Democratic Nominee for Governor of New Jersey; 1865	Succeeded by Theodore Fitz Randolph
Diplomatic posts
Preceded by William Walter Phelps	United States Ambassador to Germany; 1893 – 1896	Succeeded by Edwin F. Uhl
