= Peter Vredenburgh (judge) =

American judge

Peter Vredenburgh (1805–1873) was an associate justice of the New Jersey Supreme Court from 1854 to 1868.

Vredenburgh lived in Freehold Township, New Jersey.

A prominent and successful lawyer of Freehold, Vredenburgh "took an active and leading part in politics, and held positions of trust", serving for fifteen years as Prosecutor of the Pleas, and for a term represented Monmouth county in the Senate of New Jersey. For fourteen years he served as Associate Justice of the Supreme Court of New Jersey.

He is the father of Peter Vredenburgh Jr., lawyer and Union Army Major in the American Civil War, and William H. Vredenburgh, judge on New Jersey Court of Errors and Appeals 1897–1916.

Camp Vredenburgh, home to 14th New Jersey Volunteer Infantry, during the American Civil War, was named in his honor.

== See also ==
- New Jersey Court of Errors and Appeals
- Courts of New Jersey
- List of justices of the Supreme Court of New Jersey
