= Mount Pleasant Cemetery (Newark, New Jersey) =

Historic rural cemetery

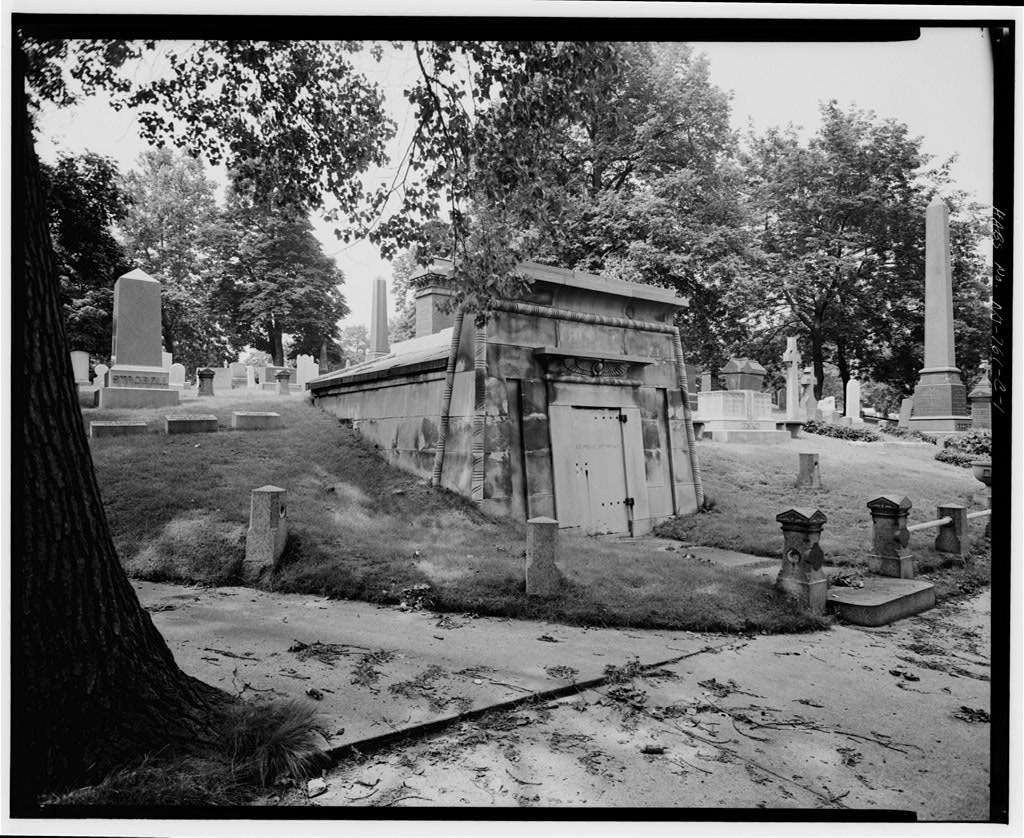
- Tomb of George Opdyke in Mount Pleasant Cemetery
- Interactive map of Mount Pleasant Cemetery

Details
- Established: 1844
- Location: 375 Broadway, Newark, New Jersey, U.S.
- Country: United States
- Coordinates: 40.7639°N 74.1640°W
- Size: 40 acres (16 ha)
- Find a Grave: Mount Pleasant Cemetery
- Mount Pleasant Cemetery
- U.S. National Register of Historic Places
- U.S. Historic district
- Architect: Horace E. Baldwin
- Architectural style: Late 19th and 20th Century Revivals, Gothic, Egyptian Revival
- NRHP reference No.: 87000836
- Added to NRHP: October 28, 1988

Mount Pleasant Cemetery is a historic rural cemetery in the North Ward of Newark in Essex County, New Jersey, United States. It is located on the west bank of the Passaic River in Newark's Broadway neighborhood, opposite Kearny. It occupies approximately 40 acres (162,000 m^{2}) and was designed by Horace Baldwin.

The cemetery is listed on both the New Jersey Register (ID #1284, since 1987) and the National Register of Historic Places (Reference #87000836, since 1988).

The graves of some of Newark's most eminent citizens are within Mount Pleasant Cemetery. The cemetery is dominated by the marble mausoleum of John Fairfield Dryden, the founder of Prudential Financial. Other notable interments include Marcus Lawrence Ward, Governor of New Jersey; Seth Boyden, inventor of patent leather; and Mary Stillman, first wife of Thomas Edison. Mount Pleasant also contains graves of members of the Kinney, Ballantine, and Frelinghuysen families.

The cemetery itself was opened and incorporated in 1844, but there are graves that date back to the mid-17th century, which were moved from older graveyards that were crowded out due to development.

== Notable burials ==
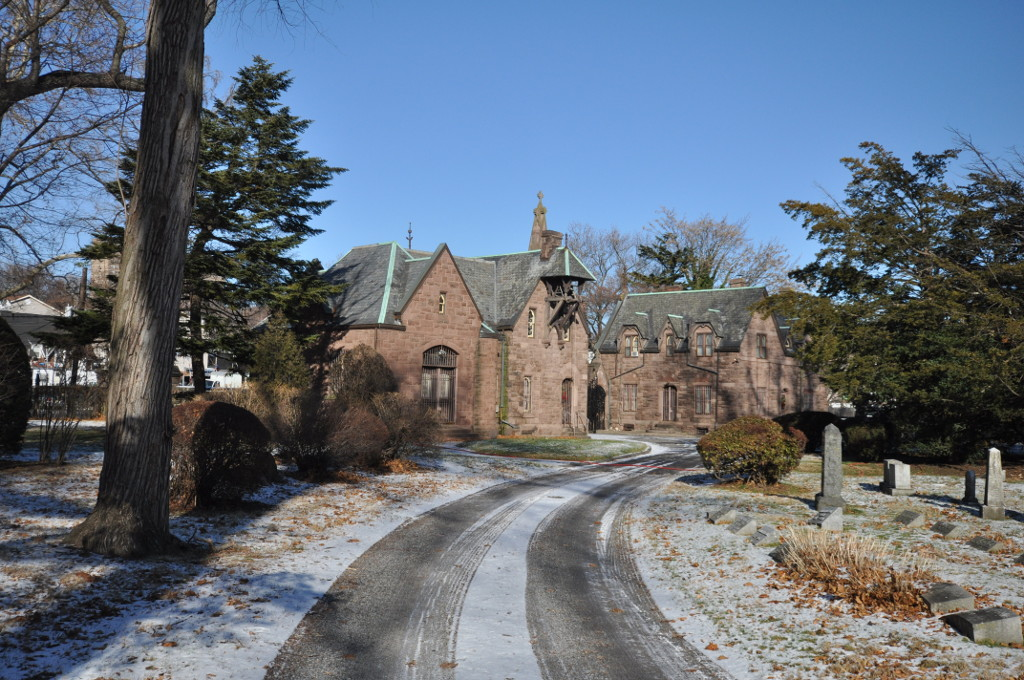
The gatehouse and entry complex as seen from inside the cemetery

- Peter Ballantine (1791–1883)
- Seth Boyden (1788–1870), inventor of patent leather
- Joseph Philo Bradley (1813–1892), Associate Justice of the Supreme Court of the United States, served on the Electoral Commission that decided the disputed 1876 presidential election
- Amanda Minnie Douglas (1831–1916), writer
- John F. Dryden (1839–1911), United States Senator and founder of Prudential Financial
- Frederick Theodore Frelinghuysen (1817–1885), member of the United States Senate representing New Jersey and a United States Secretary of State
- Charles Alling Gifford (1860–1937), architect
- Edward W. Gray (1870–1942), represented New Jersey's 8th congressional district from 1915 to 1919
- George A. Halsey (1827–1894), represented New Jersey's 7th congressional district from 1867 to 1869 and 1871–1873
- Augustus A. Hardenbergh (1830–1889), represented New Jersey's 7th congressional district from 1875 to 1879 and 1881–1883
- Ray Liotta (1954–2022), actor
- Franklin Murphy (1846–1920), 31st Governor of New Jersey
- Charles Wolcott Parker (1862–1948), Associate Justice of the Supreme Court of New Jersey from 1907 to 1947
- Thomas Baldwin Peddie (1808–1889), Mayor of Newark
- Alexander C. M. Pennington (1810–1867), represented New Jersey's 5th congressional district from 1853 to 1857
- William Pennington (1796–1862), 13th Governor of New Jersey and Speaker of the House during his single term in Congress
- Nehemiah Perry (1816–1881), member of the United States House of Representatives from New Jersey, Mayor of Newark
- Theodore Runyon (1822–1896), Civil War general, Newark mayor, and U.S. ambassador to Germany
- Marcus Lawrence Ward (1812–1884), 21st Governor of New Jersey and represented the state in Congress for one term

== See also ==
- Fairmount Cemetery, Newark
- List of burial places of justices of the Supreme Court of the United States
- List of cemeteries in New Jersey
- National Register of Historic Places listings in Essex County, New Jersey
