= Frederick William Ricord =

American author (1819–1897)

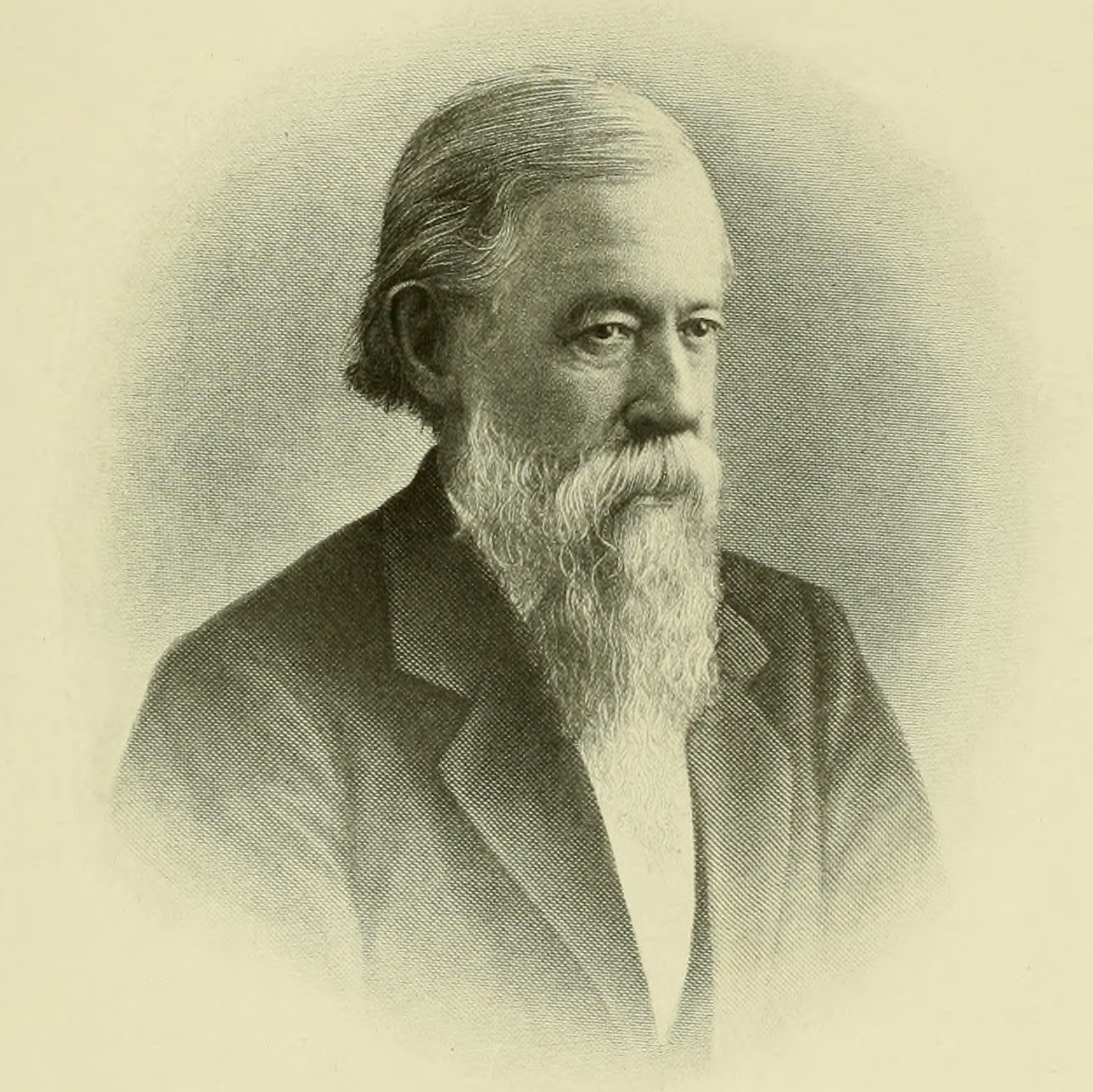
- Born: 7 October 1819; Guadeloupe
- Died: 12 August 1897; Newark

Frederick William Ricord (born in Guadeloupe, West Indies, 7 October 1819; died in Newark, New Jersey, 12 August 1897) was a noted American author.

== Biography ==
He was the son of physician Jean Baptiste Ricord and educator Elizabeth Ricord, was educated at Hobart and Rutgers, and studied law in Geneva, New York, but did not practice.

He taught for 12 years in Newark, New Jersey, was a member of the board of education of that city from 1852 until 1869, serving as president from 1867 to 1869. He was state superintendent of public schools of New Jersey in 1860–1863, sheriff of Essex County 1865–1867, mayor of Newark 1870–1874, and associate judge of the various Essex County courts 1875–1879.

He was long librarian of the New Jersey Historical Society. Ricord received the degree of A.M. from Rutgers in 1845 and Princeton in 1861.

== Writings ==
He was one of the editors of the New Jersey Archives, and published:

- History of Rome (New York, 1852)
- The Youth's Grammar (1853)
- Victor Cousin, Life of Madame de Longueville, translator (1854)
- Voltaire, The Henriade, translator (1859)
- English Songs from Foreign Tongues (1879)
- Terentius, The Self-Tormentor, translator, with more English Songs (1885)

He had ready for publication The Governors of New Jersey, which gives the history of the state from its settlement to the Revolution.

== Family ==
His brother, John Ricord, was a noted lawyer and traveler.

Political offices
Preceded by Thomas Baldwin Peddie	Mayor of Newark, New Jersey; 1870–1874	Succeeded by Nehemiah Perry
