= Board of Trade (disambiguation) =

Board of Trade may refer to:

- Chamber of commerce

== Argentina ==
- Rosario Board of Trade, a non-profit association based in Rosario, in the province of Santa Fe

== Canada ==
- Brampton Board of Trade, a business organization first founded in Brampton, Ontario in 1887
- Burnaby Board of Trade Directory, a magazine-style resource for people who are involved in the business community in Burnaby, British Columbia
- Old Toronto Board of Trade Building, the first skyscraper in Toronto at seven stories
- Toronto Board of Trade, the largest local chamber of commerce in Canada
- Vancouver Board of Trade, a not-for-profit association with the goal of developing Vancouver as a Pacific centre for trade, commerce and travel

== Spain ==
- Royal Barcelona Board of Trade

== Sweden ==
- Swedish National Board of Trade, a Swedish government agency that answers to the Ministry for Foreign Affairs

== United Kingdom ==
- Board of Trade, a committee of the Privy Council
  - Parliamentary Secretary to the Board of Trade, a member of Parliament assigned to assist the Board of Trade and its President
  - Vice-President of the Board of Trade, a junior ministerial position in the government of the United Kingdom
  - Secretary of State for Business, Enterprise and Regulatory Reform, a cabinet position with the secondary title of President of the Board of Trade

== United States ==
- California Chamber of Commerce, which traces its roots directly to the California State Board of Trade
- Board of Trade of City of Chicago v. Olsen, a decision by the Supreme Court of the United States
- Chicago Board of Trade, the world's oldest futures and options exchange
- Chicago Board of Trade Building, a skyscraper located in Chicago, Illinois
- Chicago Board of Trade Independent Battery Light Artillery, an artillery battery that served in the Union Army during the American Civil War
- Greater Washington Board of Trade, a network of business and non-profit leaders in Washington, D.C.
- Kansas City Board of Trade, a commodity futures and options exchange regulated by the Commodity Futures Trading Commission
- New York Board of Trade, a physical commodity futures exchange
- Zion's Central Board of Trade, a church-founded organization to foster economic growth and cooperation in 19th Century Utah Territory.
