= Philippe Ricord =

French physician and surgeon

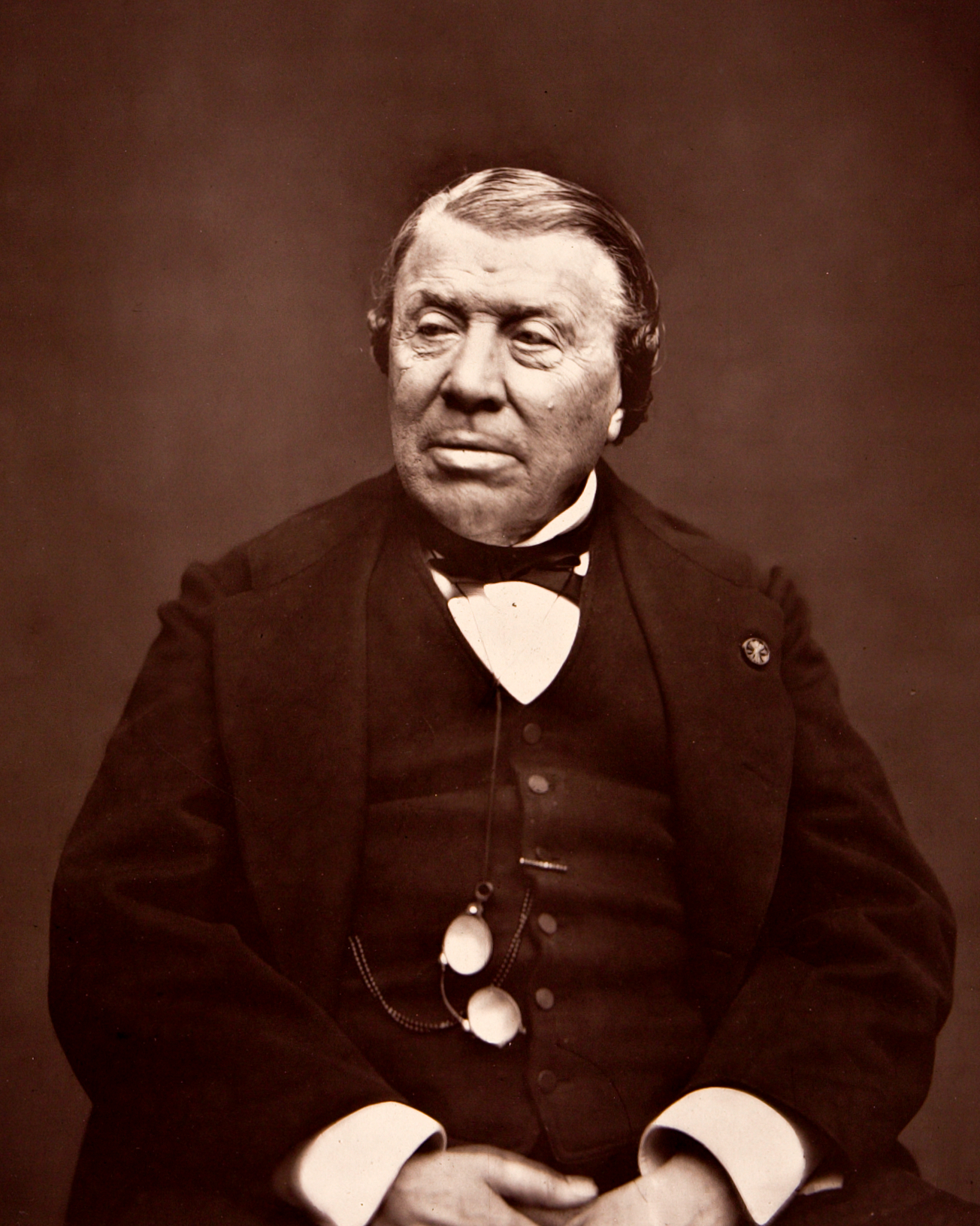
- Philippe Ricord, photographed by Étienne Carjat
- Born: December 10, 1800; Baltimore
- Died: 22 October 1889 (aged 88); Paris
- Awards: Montyon prize
- Scientific career
- Fields: medical doctor

Philippe Ricord (French pronunciation: [filip ʁikɔʁ]; 10 December 1800 – 22 October 1889) was a French medical doctorq and surgeon.

== Biography ==
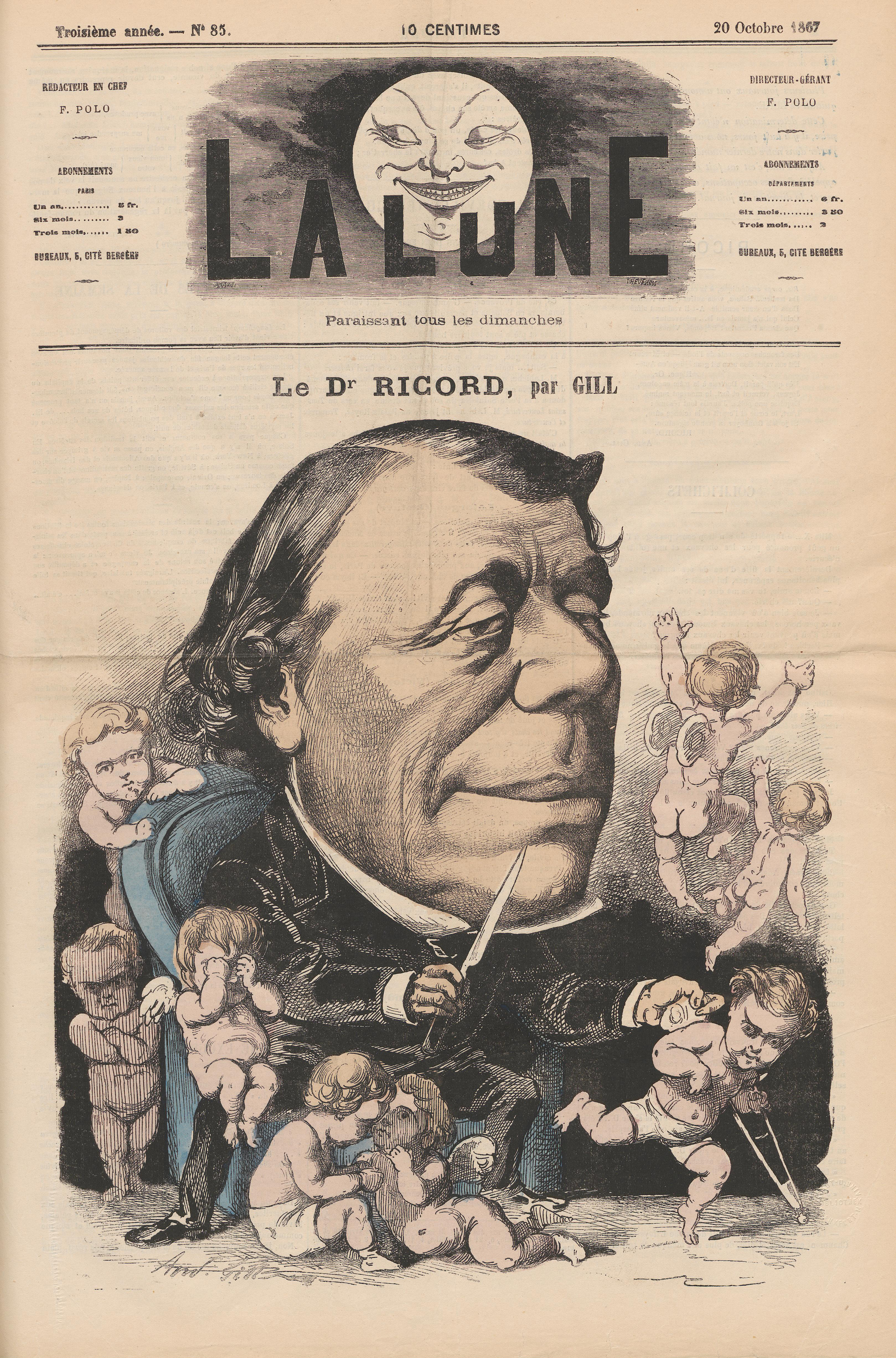
Ricord caricatured by André Gill, 1867

Philippe Ricord was born on 10 December 1800 in Baltimore. His father had escaped the French Revolution in 1790 from Marseille. He met French naturalist Charles Alexandre Lesueur, who took him back to Paris in 1820. He worked for Lesueur as curator of his specimens, and at hospitals such as Val-de-Grâce and Hôtel-Dieu de Paris. He studied under Guillaume Dupuytren, but fell out with him when Ricord published an article pointing out a procedure Dupuytren claimed to have invented was already in use in America. He transferred to Pitié-Salpêtrière Hospital to study under Jacques Lisfranc de Saint Martin. He graduated in medicine in 1826. After practicing in the provinces he returned in 1828 to the capital, and worked there as a surgeon, specializing in venereal diseases. Doctor Ricord was surgeon in chief to the hospital for venereal diseases and to the Hôpital Cochin. He won a worldwide reputation in his special field. For his suggestions on the cure of varicocele and on the operation of urethroplasty he received in 1842 one of the Montyon prizes.

In 1838, he disproved John Hunter's self-experiment, thus showing that syphilis and gonorrhea are not the same disease. Ricord's chancre is the parchment-like initial lesion of syphilis.

In 1862 Ricord was appointed physician in ordinary to Prince Napoleon. On 26 October 1869, he was named consulting surgeon to Napoleon III. For his services in the ambulance corps during the siege of Paris he was made Grand Officer of the Legion of Honor in 1871.

He was the brother of Jean Baptiste Ricord (1777–1837) who was a physician and naturalist in America. Jean Baptiste's son (Phillipe's nephew) took the name John Ricord, became a lawyer who practiced law in several notable cases while he traveled through the Republic of Texas, Oregon Territory, the Kingdom of Hawaii, and the California Gold Rush. John Ricord returned to live with Phillipe where he died in 1861. There seems to be a controversy as to whether Jean Alfred Fournier, student of Ricord, was actually his son-in-law.

== Ricord's formula ==
Ricord developed an innovative formula for the treatment of urethritis, largely used at least up to the late 1910s. It consists of a solution containing 1g zinc sulfate, 2g lead acetate, 4g Sydenham laudanum and catechu tincture in 200ml of distilled water. This formula was widely known and employed for the washing of tissue affected by simple urethritis thanks to its astringent and antiseptic properties.

== Works ==
- De l'emploi du speculum (Paris, 1833)
- De la blennorrhagie de la femme (1834)
- Emploi de l'onguent mercuriel dans le traitement de l'eresipele (1836)
- Monographie du chancre (1837)
- Théorie sur la nature et le traitement de l'épididymite (1838)
- Traite des maladies vénériennes (8 volumes, 1838; fourth edition, 1866; English translation, A Practical Lecture on Venereal Diseases, 1842; thirteenth edition, 1854)
- De l'ophthalmie blennorrhagique (1842)
- Clinique iconographique de l'Hôpital des Vénériens (1842–1851)
- De la syphilisation (1853)
- Lettres sur la syphilis (1851; third edition, 1863; English translation, 1853)
- Leçons sur le chancre (1858; second edition, 1860; English translation, 1859)
