= John Ricord =

French-American lawyer and world traveler (1813-1861)

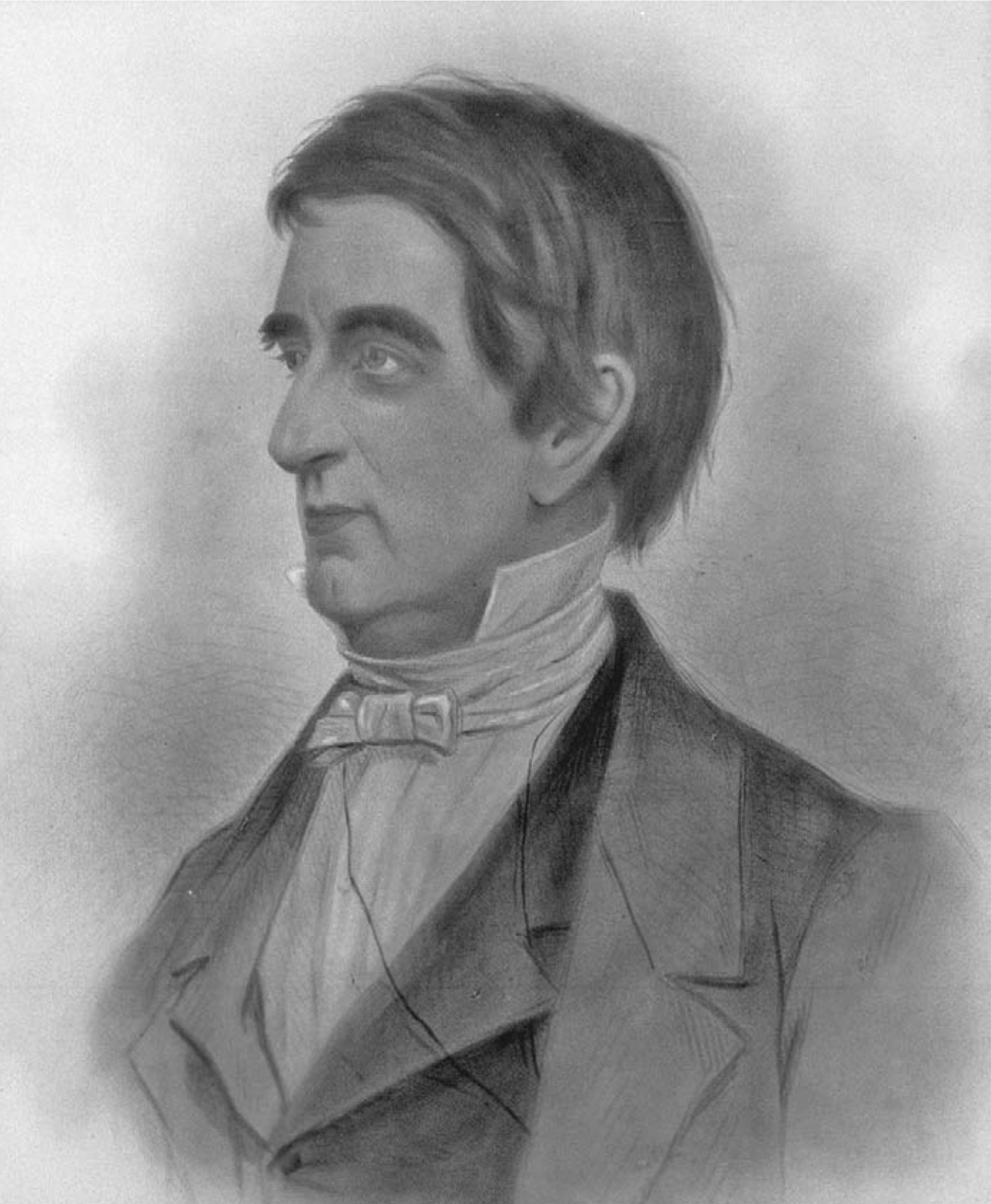
- Born: September 5, 1813; New Jersey
- Died: March 26, 1861 (aged 47); Paris
- Occupation: Lawyer
- Parent(s): Jean Baptiste Ricord de Madianna; Elizabeth Stryker

John Ricord (September 5, 1813 – March 26, 1861) was a French-American lawyer and world traveler. He was involved in cases in Texas, Oregon, Hawaii, and California.

== Life ==
John Ricord was born on September 5, 1813, in Belleville, New Jersey. His mother, Elizabeth Stryker, was an educator and writer. His father, Jean Baptiste Ricord de Madianna, was a physician and naturalist who had escaped the French Revolution with his parents. The first John Ricord grew up at the home of his maternal grandparents in Belleville, New Jersey, after his parents separated. His brother, Frederick William Ricord, became a judge and Mayor of Newark, New Jersey, then wrote articles on the history of New Jersey as secretary of the New Jersey Historical Society. He studied law in 1829 in the office of his uncle, James Stryker, and was admitted to the bar in Buffalo, New York, on March 12, 1833.

=== Texas ===
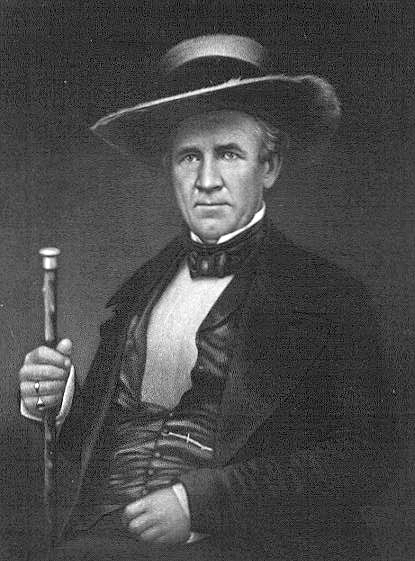

Clients included Texan Sam Houston (above) and Hawaiian King Kamehameha III (below)

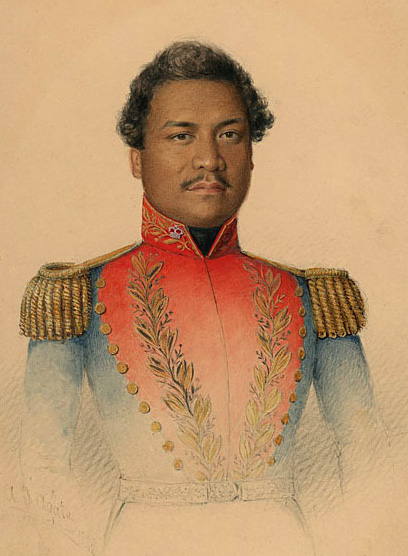

Some time in the next few years another uncle, John Stryker, encouraged him to go to the Republic of Texas. Ricord reached Velasco, Texas, in the summer of 1836 and was hired by President David G. Burnet as private secretary. Ricord then served President Sam Houston as his secretary, then chief clerk in the State Department and District Attorney of the Fourth Judicial District on December 19, 1836.

=== Oregon ===
In 1837 Ricord left Texas before his term expired. He practiced law at some time in Florida. He joined a wagon train from St. Louis, Missouri, to the Oregon Territory by 1843. He was retained by Alvin F. Waller as lawyer for a land dispute against John McLoughlin of the Hudson's Bay Company. He left from Vancouver, British Columbia in late 1843 with a group of missionaries including Jason Lee and Gustavus Hines.

=== Hawaii ===
Ricord arrived February 27, 1844, in the Hawaiian Islands on the Columbia. He was the first Western-trained lawyer in the islands. The previous year a land dispute by Richard Charlton led to a British occupation known as the Paulet Affair. A related case of Ladd & Co. required lengthy arbitration. These and one other case would consume his entire time on the islands.

He was described as:

...a restless adventurer practicing law on the frontiers of American expansionism, ...he was a true frontiersman, acting in legal debate like a fast draw sheriff who dared his opponent to test him.

Within a few weeks he swore allegiance to King Kamehameha III and on March 9, 1844, was appointed first Attorney General and Registrar of Conveyances of the Kingdom of Hawaii. In July 1845 he joined the Privy Council of Kamehameha III. On October 29, 1845, the executive branch of the government was formally organized through legislation he proposed. On February 10, 1846, he became a founding member of a board to review land titles. Former missionary William Richards was elected president of the board, and another former missionary Lorrin Andrews was appointed as a judge.

On May 17, 1847, he resigned all his offices, and on June 12 was released from his oath of allegiance, so he could resume his citizenship of the United States. He left August 19, 1847. The office of Attorney General was suspended until the 1860s. His work on organizing the courts was taken over by the second trained attorney to arrive in the islands, William Little Lee. The cause for his departure has been speculated as a power struggle with Gerrit P. Judd. A former client from his Florida days might have also had a dispute that caught up with him.

=== California ===
On September 24, 1847, Ricord arrived in Monterey, California. He made an attempt to talk William Tecumseh Sherman and Richard Barnes Mason, then military governor of California, into letting him design a government for the territory as he had done for Hawaii. He was selected to judge a case between Thomas J. Farnham and William Robert Garner. During the California Gold Rush of 1849 he first speculated on a Mercury mine with Thomas O. Larkin and then ran a store.

However, he must have not been successful in his business, because by 1853 he asked the legislature of the Hawaiian Kingdom to resolve him of his debts. The resolution failed. At some point he ended up on a ship that was involved with Juan José Flores, who had been involved in the revolution of Ecuador. It is not known if he returned himself to Hawaii. He is recorded as buying 6,102 acres (2,469 ha) of land surveyed by Chester Lyman in present-day Santa Clara County, California to the south of Rancho San Antonio.

=== Demise ===
He spent short periods in Tahiti, Thailand, and other places in the Pacific Ocean.

In December 1859 Ricord was in Austin, Texas (now capital of the U.S. State) and persuaded the Texas Legislature to grant him land and salary for his services to the republic 33 years earlier. He then returned to visit relatives in New Jersey and after a few months went to Liberia. He died in Paris on March 26, 1861, at the home of his uncle Philippe Ricord, personal physician to Napoleon III. Ricord is buried in Père Lachaise Cemetery.

== See also ==
- Attorney General of Hawaii
- Great Mahele
