= Elizabeth Ricord =

Elizabeth Ricord (2 April 1788 in New Utrecht, Long Island – 10 October 1865 in Newark, New Jersey) was an American educator.

== Biography ==
Ricord was the daughter of minister Peter Stryker. She was educated by private tutors. In 1829, she opened a seminary for young women in Geneva, New York, of which she was principal until 1842. The great religious revival that spread through western New York in 1832 originated in her seminary. In 1845, Ricord moved to Newark, where she became interested in works of charity, and was a founder of the Newark Orphan Asylum, and its directress until her death. She contributed largely to magazines and journals.

She married Jean Baptiste Ricord in 1810, and accompanied him in his expeditions to the West Indies. Their son Frederick William Ricord was a politician and author. Another son, John Ricord, was a lawyer and traveler.

== Selected works ==
- Philosophy of the Mind (Geneva, 1840)
- Zamba, or the Insurrection, a Dramatic Poem (Cambridge, Massachusetts, 1842)
