= 14th New Jersey Infantry Regiment =

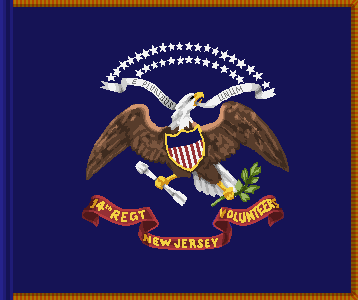
- Active: August 26, 1862, to June 18, 1865
- Country: United States
- Allegiance: Union
- Branch: Infantry
- Nickname: Monocacy Regiment
- Engagements: Bristoe Campaign; Mine Run Campaign; Battle of the Wilderness; Battle of Spottsylvania Court House; Battle of Cold Harbor; Battle of Monocacy; Shenandoah Valley Campaign; Third Battle of Winchester; Battle of Cedar Creek; Siege of Petersburg

The 14th New Jersey Infantry Regiment was an infantry regiment in the Union Army during the American Civil War. Their most notable engagement was the Battle of Monocacy, where the unit sustained heavy casualties halting a Confederate advance. Fourteen months earlier, the regiment spent their first encampment of the war guarding Monocacy Junction. The regiment was given the title of "The Monocacy Regiment".

== Service ==
The 14th New Jersey Infantry Regiment was organized at Camp Vredenburgh (named in honor of Judge Peter Vredenburgh) near Freehold, New Jersey, and mustered in for three years service on August 26, 1862, under the command of Colonel William Snyder Truex.

The regiment was attached to Defenses of Baltimore, Maryland, VIII Corps, Middle Department, to January 1863. 3rd Separate Brigade, VIII Corps, to June 1863. 3rd Provisional Brigade, French's Division, VIII Corps, to July 1863. 1st Brigade, 3rd Division, III Corps, Army of the Potomac, to March 1864. 1st Brigade, 3rd Division, VI Corps, Army of the Potomac and Army of the Shenandoah, to June 1865.

The 14th New Jersey Infantry mustered out of service near Washington, D.C., on June 18, 1865.

== Detailed service ==
Left New Jersey for Baltimore, Maryland, September 2, 1862. Duty near Monocacy, Maryland, guarding railroad bridges and other points on the Upper Potomac, until June 1863. Moved to Harper's Ferry, West Virginia, and duty there and at Maryland Heights until June 30. Moved to Frederick, Maryland, June 30, and to Monocacy July 2. Pursuit of Lee July 6–24. Manassas Gap, Virginia, July 20. Wapping Heights July 23. Duty on line of the Rappahannock and Rapidan until October. Bristoe Campaign October 9–22. Advance to line of the Rappahannock November 7–8. Kelly's Ford November 7. Brandy Station November 8. Mine Run Campaign November 26-December 2. Payne's Farm November 27. Mine Run November 28–30. Demonstration on the Rapidan February 6–7, 1864. Campaign from the Rapidan to the James May 3-June 15. Battles of the Wilderness May 5–7; Spotsylvania May 8–12; Spotsylvania Court House May 12–21. Assault on the Salient, "Bloody Angle," May 12. North Anna River May 23–26. On line of the Pamunkey May 26–28. Totopotomoy May 28–31. Hanovertown May 30–31. Cold Harbor June 1–12. Before Petersburg June 17-July 9. Jerusalem Plank Road June 22–23. Moved to Baltimore, thence to Frederick, Maryland, July 6–8. Battle of Monocacy July 9. Expedition to Snicker's Gap July 14–23. Sheridan's Shenandoah Valley Campaign August 7-November 28. Battle of Winchester September 19. Fisher's Hill September 22. Battle of Cedar Creek October 19. Duty in the Shenandoah Valley until December. Moved to Washington, D.C., thence to Petersburg, Virginia, December 3–6. Siege of Petersburg December 6, 1864, to April 2, 1865. Dabney's Mills. Hatcher's Run, February 5–7, 1865. Fort Fisher, Petersburg, March 25. Appomattox Campaign March 28-April 9. Assault on and capture of Petersburg April 2. Pursuit of Lee April 3–9. Appomattox Court House April 9. Surrender of Lee and his army. March to Danville April 23–27, and duty there until May 18. Moved to Richmond, Virginia, thence to Washington, D.C., May 18-June 2. Corps Review June 8.

== Casualties ==
The regiment lost a total of 257 men during service; 8 officers and 139 enlisted men killed or mortally wounded, 110 enlisted men died of disease.

== Commanders ==
- Colonel William Snyder Truex
- Lieutenant Colonel Caldwell K. Hall – commanded at the battles of the Wilderness and Monocacy on July 9, 1864
- Captain Jacob Jones Janeway – commanded during Monocacy upon wounding of Lieutenant Colonel Hall at Monocacy until assignment of Major Vredenburgh
- Major Peter Vredenburgh Jr – commanded August 19, 1864 until his death September 19, 1864 at the Battle of Opequon
- Lieutenant Colonel Jacob Jones Janeway – commanded immediately after Opequon until regiment mustered out in June 1865

== See also ==
- List of New Jersey Civil War units
- New Jersey in the American Civil War
- 14th New Jersey Volunteer Infantry monument
