= Abel Minard =

American industrialist and entrepreneur

Abel Minard (September 25, 1814 - January 31, 1871) was an American industrialist and entrepreneur. He established the Minard home in Morristown to provide education for female orphans of Methodist foreign missionaries and clergymen.

== Biography ==
Minard was born September 25, 1814 on Morristown, New Jersey. Abel Minard was the son of Abel Minard, a glass blower from Sandlake, NY. Little is known about his business ventures but he was noted for his commitment to support the education and empowerment of young women. In 1870, he donated a Morristown property to Edmund S. Janes to be converted as a home to female orphans and half orphans of foreign missionaries and deceased ministers.

Minard died on January 31, 1871.
