= Theodore F. Randolph =

American politician (1826–1883)

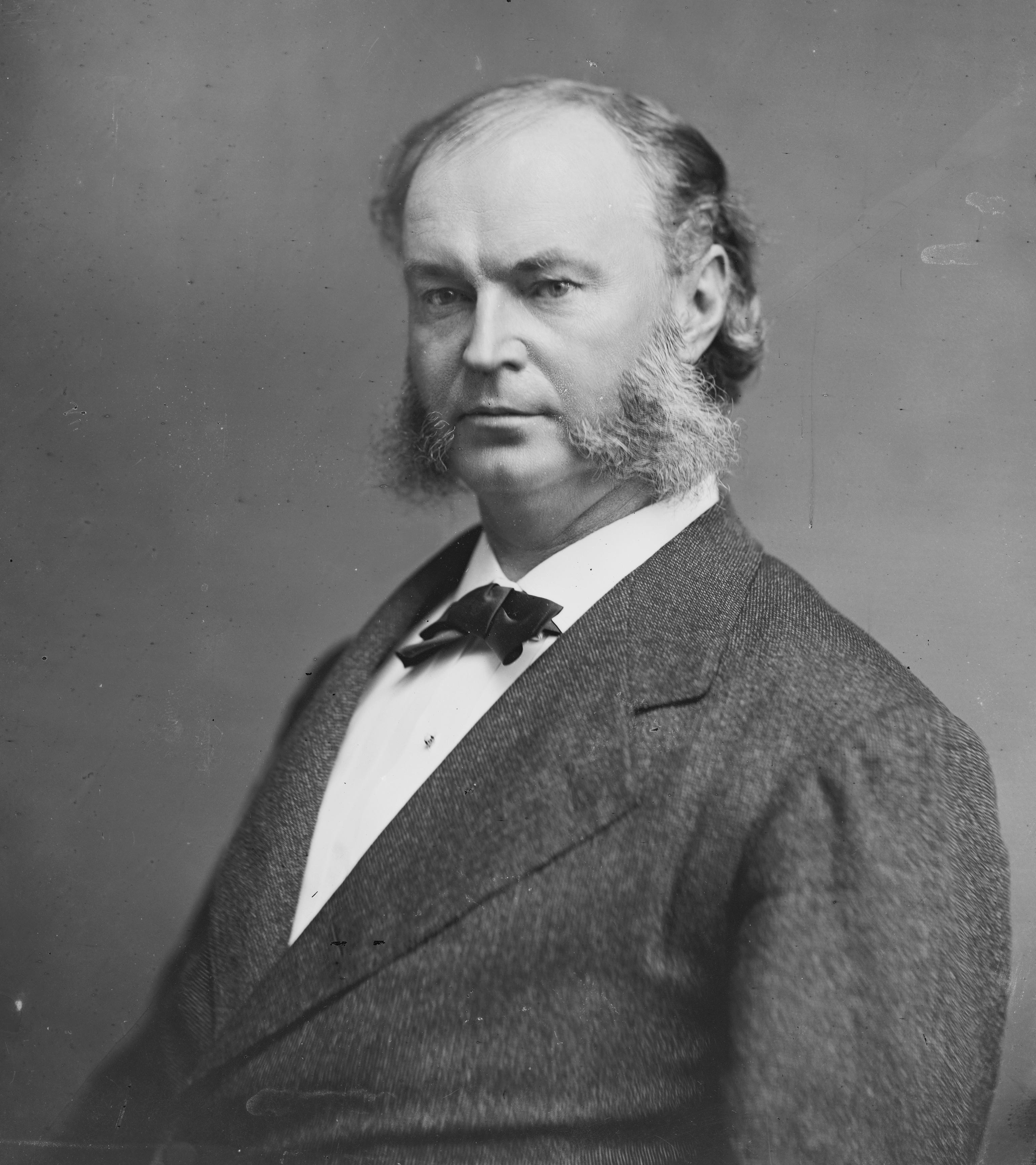

United States Senator from New Jersey
- In office March 4, 1875 – March 3, 1881
- Preceded by: John P. Stockton
- Succeeded by: William J. Sewell

22nd Governor of New Jersey
- In office January 19, 1869 – January 16, 1872
- Preceded by: Marcus L. Ward
- Succeeded by: Joel Parker

Member of the New Jersey Senate from Hudson County
- In office 1862–1865
- Preceded by: Samuel Wescott
- Succeeded by: Charles H. Winfield

Member of the New Jersey General Assembly from Hudson County
- In office 1859

Personal details
- Born: June 24, 1826 New Brunswick, New Jersey, U.S.
- Died: November 7, 1883 (aged 57) Morristown, New Jersey, U.S.
- Party: Whig (1848–52); Democratic (after 1852)

Theodore Fitz Randolph (June 24, 1826 – November 7, 1883) was an American attorney, businessman, and politician who served as the 22nd governor of New Jersey from 1869 to 1872 and represented the state in the United States Senate from 1875 to 1881. He was the son of U.S. Representative James F. Randolph.

His term as Governor was primarily focused on corporate tax reform, eliminating exemptions granted to the state's transportation monopolies and leading to the establishment of a uniform tax code shortly after he left office.

== Early life and business career ==
Theodore Fitz Randolph was born in New Brunswick, New Jersey on June 24, 1826, to James F. Randolph and Sarah Kent Carman. His father was a printer and publisher of the New Brunswick Fredonian who represented New Jersey as an at-large United States Representative from 1828 to 1833.

Theodore attended the Rutgers Grammar School and worked as a writer and proofreader for the Fredonian until the age of sixteen, when he entered into a mercantile career, primarily based in the American South. At twenty, he moved to Vicksburg, Mississippi but returned to Jersey City in 1850 to work in his father's extensive coal and iron business. He lived there until resettling in Morristown, where he purchased a ninety-acre stock farm in 1862.

In 1867, after his first campaign for governor, Randolph was appointed president of the Morris and Essex Railroad. He remained in that position until his 1868 election as governor.

In 1871, he was also one of the executors of the estate of American entrepreneur, industrialist and banking magnate Abel Minard.

== Early political career ==
After admission to the bar in 1848, Randolph entered politics as a member of the Whig Party who supported states' rights and consistently opposed the abolition of slavery, like his father. However, the party entered a rapid decline after the 1852 elections and Randolph soon joined the Democratic Party.

=== New Jersey General Assembly ===
In 1860, a coalition of Democrats and Know-Nothings elected Randolph to the New Jersey General Assembly from Jersey City. In the Assembly, he sat on the Special Joint Committee on National Affairs, leading the unsuccessful effort to avert the American Civil War. That effort culminated in resolutions appointing New Jersey delegates to the Washington Peace Conference in February 1861.

=== New Jersey Senate ===
In November 1861, following the outbreak of the American Civil War, Randolph won a special election to fill a vacancy in the New Jersey Senate. He was re-elected to a full three-year term in 1862.

In the Senate, Randolph was the chief ally of Governor Joel Parker, and they joined in criticism Abraham Lincoln's operation of the war while opposing anti-war efforts. His legislative leadership thwarted Copperhead efforts to limit war appropriations and defeated calls for an armistice. He also introduced a relief bill in 1865 to extend equal benefits and enlistment bounties to black soldiers, arguing that whites should not do injustice to an "inferior" race. However, he opposed the adoption of the Thirteenth Amendment to the United States Constitution on the grounds that slavery was already doomed and the Amendment would eliminate the change for a negotiated peace with the South.

Randolph was also chairman of the Senate Finance Committee, which position he used to reform corporate taxation, create a state comptroller's office, and oppose a plan under which the state would assume responsibility for paying local bounties to army volunteers.

== Governor of New Jersey ==
=== 1865 campaign ===
With Governor Parker term-limited, Randolph campaigned to succeed him as governor in 1865. However, he finished second in the Democratic convention balloting to Theodore Runyon, the Copperhead mayor of Newark. Runyon went on to lose the general election to Republican Marcus Lawrence Ward.

=== 1868 campaign ===
After Ward's term, no Republican would be elected Governor for nearly thirty years. Randolph won the Democratic nomination to succeed him and defeated John Insley Blair in the general election to begin a nine-term streak of Democratic governors.

=== Term in office (1869–72) ===
In his inaugural address as governor, Randolph advocated prompt readmission of the Confederate states, the revision of state election laws, new corporate taxes, equity in individual taxation, and the creation of a new riparian commission.

==== Reform ====
He began to implement his program within months by urging the legislature to create a uniform system of corporate taxation to replace the existing "transit duties" which some corporations paid in lieu of any other tax. This law was particularly aimed at the monopolies granted to the Delaware and Raritan Canal Company and Camden and Amboy Railroad and Transportation Company. Though the legislature successfully repealed the transit duties system in 1868, no uniform railroad tax was passed until 1873. In 1869, the legislature ended certain corporate exemptions and levied a two percent corporate income tax. However, this tax was found unenforceable and repealed in 1872.

His term in office saw expanded government services and increased costs. His administration took steps to reform and improve state correction, education, and asylum facilities. His prison reforms were partly motivated by an interest in making the system self-sustaining by improvement management and increasing the productivity of convict labor. On recommendation from a special commission, Randolph urged the legislature to expand Trenton State Prison and create a "house of correction" to employee short-term convicts in an environment free from hardened criminals. The expansion passed, but no special house of correction was established. In his final annual message, Randolph claimed his prison reforms had saved the state nearly $200,000.

In education, Randolph's administration expanded the free public school system statewide and laid the groundwork for a new "lunatic asylum" in Morris Plains, which opened in 1876.

In his last year in office, 1871–72, Randolph secured action on his plan for election reform. The legislature passed a stringent law that disenfranchised the recipient and provider of any election bribe and put guilty corporations in jeopardy at losing their charter. However, the law had little effect, and bribery complaints continued to increase.

With both houses controlled by the Republican Party in 1871, Randolph spent most of his last year vetoing bills, though he claimed he only did so in cases where the bills were "clearly unconstitutional, where unintentional mistakes had been made, or where the ends of Justice were clearly to be violated." His vetoes included bills which would, in his view, promote railroad expansion at taxpayer or property owner expense and reorganize municipal government for partisan purposes. The most important of these was of the Republican bill to reorganize Jersey City. The bill passed over his veto.

==== Riots ====
Apart from his legislative reform agenda, Randolph's tenure was marked by his successful handling of two crises in 1870 and 1871.

The first was the "Bergen Riot," a violent dispute between competing railway companies. Randolph called in the National Guard to quell the violence, and the two companies settled their differences in court. In July 1871, Randolph averted a threatened riot in Jersey City when he prevented Irish-Americans from disrupting a parade planned by Orangemen on the anniversary of the Battle of the Boyne. Though he publicly criticized the Orangemen for inciting sectarian violence, he issued a proclamation declaring his intention to protect the right to peaceful assembly for all citizens and an order to raise three thousand troops as necessary to prevent violence. Civil authorities ultimately handled the threat without military assistance.

== United States Senator ==
After his handling of the Orangemen affair, Randolph was mentioned nationally as a contender for president in 1872. Instead, Randolph pursued a seat United States Senate. In his final annual address, Randolph addressed national affairs. After leaving office in January 1872, he actively campaigned to recruit a Democratic alternative to Ulysses S. Grant and Horace Greeley. He ultimately supported Greeley, as did most Democrats, but faced accusations that he had exchanged his support for a cabinet position in a potential Greeley administration.

In 1875, the Democratic legislature elected Randolph to the Senate to succeed John P. Stockton. He served on the Committees on Commerce, Military Affairs, Education, Civil Service Reform, and the Centennial Exhibition. He also served on the special Committee to examine South Carolina's 1876 presidential election returns. He chaired the Committee on Military Affairs in the Forty-sixth United States Congress.

As Senator, Randolph spoke infrequently, but established his reputation as a Bourbon Democrat. He opposed President Grant's Reconstruction policies, government aid to parochial schools, and the remonetization of silver. He favored early redemption of paper currency.

== Personal life ==
In 1852, Randolph married Fannie Coleman, the daughter of Congressman Nicholas D. Coleman of Kentucky.

He invented a ditching machine and a steam typewriter. He was a trustee of Rutgers College and a president of the Washington Association of New Jersey.

== Death and burial ==
Randolph died in Morristown, Morris County, New Jersey, and is interred in Evergreen Cemetery, Morristown.

Political offices
| Preceded by Marcus Lawrence Ward | Governor of New Jersey; January 19, 1869 – January 16, 1872 | Succeeded by Joel Parker |
U.S. Senate
| Preceded by John P. Stockton | U.S. senator (Class 1) from New Jersey; March 4, 1875 – March 3, 1881; Served alongside: Frederick Theodore Frelinghuysen, John R. McPherson | Succeeded by William Joyce Sewell |
Party political offices
| Preceded by Theodore Runyon | Democratic Nominee for Governor of New Jersey; 1868 | Succeeded by Joel Parker |
