= George A. Halsey =

American politician

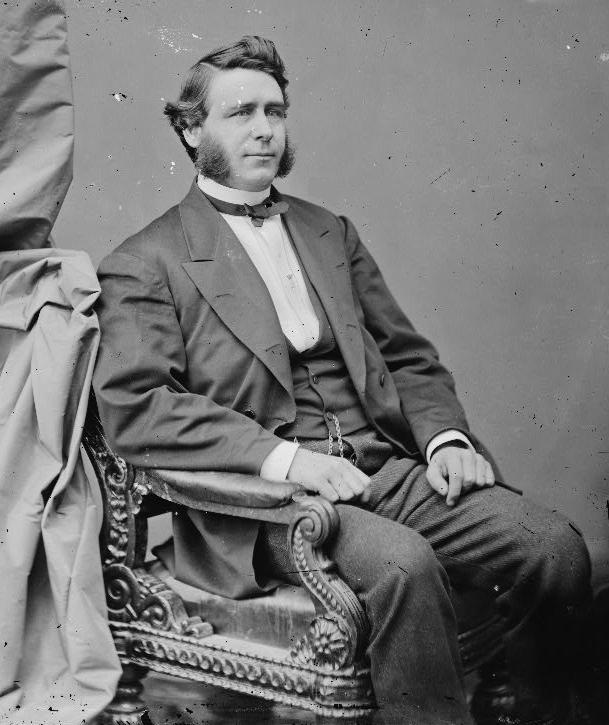

Member of the U.S. House of Representatives from New Jersey's 5th district
- In office March 4, 1867 – March 3, 1869
- Preceded by: Edwin R. V. Wright
- Succeeded by: Orestes Cleveland
- In office March 4, 1871 – March 3, 1873
- Preceded by: Orestes Cleveland
- Succeeded by: William Walter Phelps

Member of the New Jersey General Assembly
- In office 1861–1862

Personal details
- Born: George Armstrong Halsey; December 7, 1827 Springfield Township, Union County, New Jersey, U.S.
- Died: April 1, 1894 (aged 66) Newark, New Jersey, U.S.
- Resting place: Mount Pleasant Cemetery
- Party: Republican
- Profession: Politician, leather manufacturer

George Armstrong Halsey (December 7, 1827 – April 1, 1894) was a 19th-century American Republican Party politician and leather manufacturer from New Jersey, who served two non-consecutive terms representing New Jersey's 5th congressional district.

== Early life and education ==
Born in Springfield Township, New Jersey, his parents were Samuel and Mary Halsey (née Hutchings). Halsey attended local schools as a child and later Springfield Academy.

== Career ==
In 1840 Armstrong moved to Newark, New Jersey, where his father engaged in the leather business. In 1846, at age 19, he entered the firm which was called Samuel Halsey & Sons even after the death of his father.

He was a member of the New Jersey General Assembly in 1861 and 1862, and was United States assessor of internal revenue, from 1862 to 1866. He was offered, but declined, the post of Register of the Treasury.

Halsey was elected a Republican to the United States House of Representatives in 1866, serving from 1867 to 1869, being unsuccessful for reelection in 1868. He was later elected back in 1870, serving again from 1871 to 1873, not being a candidate for renomination in 1872. There, he served as chairman of the Committee on Public Buildings and Grounds from 1871 to 1873.

Afterwards, he resumed former manufacturing pursuits and was president of and insurance company.

== Death and burial ==
Halsey died in Newark, New Jersey, on April 1, 1894, of pneumonia.

A large number of prominent men attended his funeral, including United States Senator James Smith Jr., and many state political leaders.

Halsey was interred in Mount Pleasant Cemetery in Newark.

U.S. House of Representatives
| Preceded by Edwin R. V. Wright | Member of the U.S. House of Representatives from New Jersey's 5th congressional district March 4, 1867 – March 3, 1869 | Succeeded by Orestes Cleveland |
| Preceded by Orestes Cleveland | Member of the U.S. House of Representatives from New Jersey's 5th congressional district March 4, 1871 – March 3, 1873 | Succeeded by William W. Phelps |
Party political offices
| Preceded by Cornelius Walsh | Republican Nominee for Governor of New Jersey; 1874 | Succeeded by William A. Newell |
