= Peter Vredenburgh (politician) =

American politician (1836–1915)

Peter Vredenburgh (1836–1915) was a member of the Wisconsin State Assembly in 1883, representing the 2nd District of Winnebago County, Wisconsin. He was a Republican. Vredenburgh was born on January 28, 1836, as the son of David Vredenburgh and Julia Ann Dudrey. He married the Canadian-born Elliner Bell (1843–1897). He died at the age of 78 on January 8, 1915, in Elberton, Washington, but was buried with his wife at the Bell family cemetery in Winneconne, Wisconsin.
