= Peter Vredenburgh Jr. =

American lawyer and Union Army major (1837–1864)

- Born: September 12, 1837; Freehold Township, New Jersey
- Died: September 19, 1864 (aged 27); Winchester, Virginia (Battle of Opequon)
- Burial place: Winchester, Virginia, later Freehold, New Jersey
- Military career
- Allegiance: United States
- Branch: (United States) Union Army Infantry
- Service years: 1862–1864
- Rank: Major
- Unit: 14th New Jersey Volunteer Infantry Regiment
- Conflicts: American Civil War Eastern Campaigns
- Other work: Lawyer

Peter Vredenburgh Jr. (September 12, 1837 – September 19, 1864) was a lawyer and Union Army Major in the American Civil War. He was born in Freehold Township in Monmouth County, New Jersey. His father was Peter Vredenburgh, Associate Justice of the New Jersey Supreme Court. He studied law in Poughkeepsie, New York and was admitted to the New Jersey Bar in 1859 and moved to Eatontown, New Jersey, where he practiced law.

When President Lincoln called for volunteers to help preserve the Union Vredenburgh joined the 14th New Jersey Volunteer Infantry Regiment at Camp Vredenburgh, Freehold, New Jersey, and was commissioned major. The 14th New Jersey Infantry was attached to the Army of the Potomac and served in the Eastern Campaigns. Vredenburgh served in various staff appointments until after the Battle of Monocacy when he requested and was granted permission to return to his regiment. He was killed September 19, 1864 at Winchester, Virginia in the Battle of Opequon.

His letters to family and friends remain a significant source of documentation of the lives and struggles of Civil War soldiers and their opinions of the Army and the conduct of the war.
