= Joel Parker (politician) =

American attorney and politician (1816–1888)

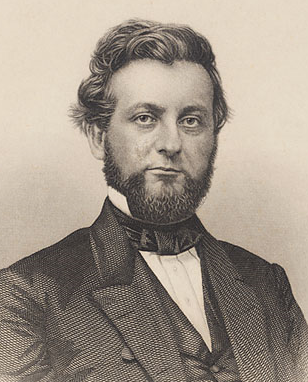

20th Governor of New Jersey
- In office January 20, 1863 – January 16, 1866
- Preceded by: Charles Smith Olden
- Succeeded by: Marcus Lawrence Ward
- In office January 16, 1872 – January 19, 1875
- Preceded by: Theodore Fitz Randolph
- Succeeded by: Joseph D. Bedle

19th Attorney General of New Jersey
- In office 1875
- Preceded by: Robert Gilchrist Jr.
- Succeeded by: Joseph Vanatta

Monmouth County Prosecutor
- In office 1852–1857

Member of the New Jersey General Assembly from Monmouth County
- In office 1848–1852

Personal details
- Born: November 24, 1816 near Freehold Township, New Jersey, U.S.
- Died: January 2, 1888 (aged 71) Philadelphia, Pennsylvania, U.S.
- Party: Democratic
- Education: The College of New Jersey (Princeton University)
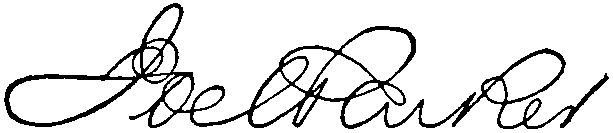
- Signature

Joel Parker (November 24, 1816 – January 2, 1888) was an American attorney and Democratic Party politician who served two non-consecutive terms as the 20th governor of New Jersey from 1863 to 1866 and 1872 to 1875. As a Democratic governor during the American Civil War, Parker was one of the leading critics of the Abraham Lincoln administration's domestic and military policy, though he was generally a supporter of the Union war effort. In 1868 and 1876, he was nominated for President of the United States as a favorite son by New Jersey's party delegation.

== Early life and education ==
Joel Parker was born on November 24, 1816, near Freehold Township, New Jersey to Charles and Sarah (Coward) Parker. His father was a member of the New Jersey Legislature for several years, and served one term as state treasurer. After his father's appointment as Treasurer, the family moved to Trenton. In 1833, his father became cashier of the Mechanics' and Manufacturers' Bank of Trenton and Joel was sent to Monmouth to tend the family's recently purchased farm.

Joel graduated from the College of New Jersey (now known as Princeton University) in the class of 1839. After graduation, he worked in the law office of Henry W. Green, who later became chief justice and chancellor of the New Jersey courts. Parker was admitted to the bar in 1842 and opened a legal practice in Freehold.

== Career ==
=== Beginnings ===
Parker became active in Democratic Party politics in Freehold, campaigning for Martin Van Buren in 1840 and James K. Polk in 1844.

In 1847, he was elected to the General Assembly as a Democrat. Though the legislature had a Whig majority, Parker was able to secure passage of a tax reform package in 1850 which equalized taxation by taxing personal as well as real property.

In 1851, Parker did not run for re-election to the Assembly but was appointed prosecutor of the pleas for Monmouth County (the equivalent of a modern County Prosecutor), in which office he served for five years. In 1857, he was elected Brigadier General in command of the Monmouth and Ocean Brigade of the New Jersey militia. He continued to be active in politics and served as a New Jersey presidential elector for Stephen A. Douglas in 1860.

At the onset of the American Civil War, New Jersey Governor Charles Smith Olden appointed Parker Major General of the New Jersey militia.

=== Governor of New Jersey ===
==== First term (1863–66) ====
In 1862, the Democratic Party of New Jersey nominated Parker for governor over Mayor of Newark Moses Bigelow. He ran as a "War Democrat" who supported a military solution to the American Civil War rather than accommodation of the Confederacy. He defeated Marcus Lawrence Ward by the largest margin in New Jersey history up to that time.

In his inaugural address in 1863, Parker affirmed that he viewed secession as a "political heresy" but affirmed the doctrine of state sovereignty over all matters not constitutionally delegated to the federal government. He further attributed the outbreak of war to "a minority of fanatical and ultra men in each section," and defended the war insofar as necessary to "defend and maintain the supremacy of the Constitution and preserve the Union." To that end, he was highly critical of the Lincoln administration for curtailing civil liberties in the name of the war effort, castigating Lincoln for suspending habeas corpus, the Emancipation Proclamation, and expanding his war powers generally. He pledged to counteract the Lincoln administration to protect civil liberties to whatever extent possible through his powers as Governor. In May 1863, Parker condemned the arrest, trial and deportation of Copperhead Clement Vallandigham, saying the measures "were arbitrary and illegal acts. The whole proceeding was wrong in principle and dangerous in its tendency."

During Parker's first term, the anti-war Copperhead faction came to dominate the state legislature and passed "peace resolutions" which condemned the Lincoln administration along Parker's terms but additionally called on the federal government to appoint commissioners to negotiate a peace agreement. Despite reservations, Parker signed the resolutions on March 24, 1863. Because a peace agreement would end the war and allow the South to remain outside the Union, Republicans nationwide condemned them as nothing less than an endorsement of secession.

Despite his signature of the resolutions, Parker remained a supporter of the Union war effort generally. During Robert E. Lee's invasion of Pennsylvania in the summer of 1863, Governor Parker raised and supplied several organized regiments of New Jersey volunteers to protect that state, for which he was thanked by President Lincoln and Pennsylvania Governor Andrew G. Curtin. In November, Parker attended the ceremonies dedicating the Soldiers' National Cemetery at which Lincoln delivered the Gettysburg Address.

Though he raised volunteer regiments, Parker was resistant to an effort to conscript New Jerseyans into the war. Through 1863, he met the state's military quotas through the use of bounties. When a levy of 12,000 men was made on New Jersey in 1864, to make good a supposed deficiency in her former quotas, he obtained from President Lincoln the withdrawal of the order. In his first annual address, he criticized the Emancipation Proclamation but agreed with Lincoln that it was the duty of state authorities to "furnish the men necessary to destroy the armed power of the rebellion."

In 1864, Parker opposed federal efforts to establish a railway through the state between New York City and Philadelphia, which would have undermined the state monopoly New Jersey had granted to the Camden & Amboy Railroad. The bill incorporating the new federal line died in the United States Senate.

Parker's criticisms of the Lincoln administration reached their peak in August 1864, when he delivered a speech in his native Freehold calling for a peaceful settlement of the war. While he continued to supply the necessary troops to repel Confederate invasions of the Union, Parker now blamed Republicans for obstructing efforts to end the war and continued to criticize efforts to abolish slavery, including the Thirteenth Amendment to the United States Constitution, which he found inferior to gradual emancipation by the states. In his final annual address, Parker opposed black suffrage and called for "speedy resumption of the relations of all the States with the federal government" by the abolition of the Reconstruction governments, which he condemned as illegal.

Parker established a method of settlement of the war debt so that not a bond of the state of New Jersey was sold below par, and at the close of the war in 1865 there was a surplus of $200,000 in the state treasury. He strongly favored amnesty toward those that had actively supported the Confederacy in the Civil War. After leaving office in 1866, he returned to his legal practice in Freehold.

==== Second term (1872–75) ====
In 1871, Parker was elected to a second term in office, making him the first governor to win a second popular election. In his second term, he continued to criticize Reconstruction policies and express support for state sovereignty. Without the ongoing war, his second term focused more heavily on domestic policy, including corruption in state government. During his second term, the legislature passed more bills than in during previous administration. Among them was a general regulation of railroads.

Parker also secured passage for a package of amendments to the state constitution, the first since its ratification in 1844. They included salary adjustments and an oath for legislators, guarantees for free education, prohibition on the passage of certain special or local laws, and a line-item veto in appropriation bills. Parker was an active supporter of the planned Centennial Exhibition to be held in Philadelphia in 1876.

=== Post-governorship ===
Parker's preferred successor, Joseph D. Bedle, was elected in 1874. Bedle named Parker as Attorney General of New Jersey in 1875. In 1880, Governor George B. McClellan appointed Parker to the New Jersey Supreme Court, where he served until 1888. He served as a presidential elector again in 1876 for Samuel Tilden. He was a leading figure in the establishment of the monument to the Battle of Monmouth in Freehold.

=== Presidential candidate ===
He was the "favorite son" candidate supported by New Jersey electors at the Democratic National Conventions in 1868, 1876, and 1880. In 1868, the New Jersey delegation cast their full vote for him in every ballot for the presidential nomination.

== Personal life ==
Parker married Maria Mott-Gummere in 1843 and the couple had two sons and a daughter.

== Death and legacy ==
After serving as governor, Parker returned to the practice of law. He died on January 2, 1888, in Philadelphia. He was buried in Maplewood Cemetery in Freehold Township. In 1878, R. M. Stults dedicated the Battle Monument Waltz to Gov. Parker.

== See also ==
- List of governors of New Jersey

Political offices
Preceded by Charles S. Olden	Governor of New Jersey; January 20, 1863 – January 16, 1866	Succeeded by Marcus Lawrence Ward
Preceded by Theodore Fitz Randolph	Governor of New Jersey; January 16, 1872 – January 19, 1875	Succeeded by Joseph D. Bedle
Party political offices
Preceded by Edwin R. V. Wright	Democratic Nominee for Governor of New Jersey; 1862	Succeeded by Theodore Runyon
Preceded by Theodore Fitz Randolph	Democratic Nominee for Governor of New Jersey; 1871	Succeeded by Joseph D. Bedle
Legal offices
Preceded by Robert Gilchrist, Jr.	New Jersey Attorney General; 1875	Succeeded by Jacob Vanatta
Preceded by unknown	New Jersey Supreme Court; Associate Justice; 1880–1888	Succeeded by Charles G. Garrison
