= List of Lawrenceville School alumni =

The following is a list of notable alumni of Lawrenceville School, a coeducational, independent college preparatory boarding school located in the historic Lawrenceville section of Lawrence Township, New Jersey.

== A ==
- George Akerlof (born 1940; class of 1958), Nobel laureate for Economics
- Knowlton Ames (1868–1931; class of 1886), All-American football player at Princeton and head football coach at Purdue University
- Garth Ancier (born 1957), president of the WB Network
- A. Piatt Andrew (1873–1936; class of 1889), assistant secretary of the treasury (1910–1912) and U.S. congressman from Massachusetts
- Walter G. Andrews (1889–1949; class of 1908), U.S. representative from New York (1931–1949)

== B ==
- David Baird Jr. (1881–1955; class of 1899), U.S. senator from New Jersey
- Dewey F. Bartlett (1919–1979; class of 1938), former governor of Oklahoma and member of the United States Senate
- Dierks Bentley (born 1975; class of 1993), country music singer
- Bill Berkson (1939–2016; class of 1957), poet
- Barton Biggs (1932–2012; class of 1951), former Morgan Stanley chief global strategist; former money manager running Traxis Partners
- C. Ledyard Blair (1867–1949; class of 1886), founder of investment bank Blair & Co., delegate to the Republican National Convention from New Jersey, governor of the New York Stock Exchange, owner of Blairsden and the C. Ledyard Blair House
- Thomas Pickens Brady (1903–1973; class of 1923), jurist, segregationist, associate justice of the Mississippi Supreme Court
- Suleiman Braimoh (born 1989), Nigerian-American basketball player in the Israel Basketball Premier League
- George Houston Brown (1810–1865), represented New Jersey's 4th congressional district in the United States House of Representatives, 1853–1855
- Frederick Buechner (1926–2022; class of 1943), novelist
- Dennis Bushyhead (1826–1898; class of 1843), principal chief of the Cherokee Nation
- Fox Butterfield (born 1939; class of 1957), Pulitzer Prize-winning journalist for The New York Times

== C ==
- Jay Carney (born 1965; class of 1983), 29th White House press secretary; former Time Washington bureau chief; former White House correspondent
- Charles Chaplin Jr. (1925–1968), actor; son of Charlie Chaplin
- Sydney Chaplin (1926–2009), actor; son of Charlie Chaplin
- Korawad Chearavanont (class of 2012), entrepreneur; grandson of Dhanin Chearavanont
- John Cobb Cooper (1887–1967), jurist and airline executive
- Merian C. Cooper (1893–1973; class of 1911), film director best known for King Kong (1933)
- Kelly Curtis (born 1989), skeleton racer who competed at the 2022 Winter Olympics and 2026 Winter Olympics

== D ==
- Alan D'Andrea (class of 1974), cancer researcher and the Alvan T. and Viola D. Fuller American Cancer Society Professor of Radiation Oncology at Harvard Medical School
- Richard Dean (1956–2006), fashion and advertising photographer, model, and player in Canadian Football League
- Frederick B. Deknatel (1905–1973; class of 1924), art historian
- William Adams Delano (1874–1960), architect
- Christopher DeMuth (born 1946; class of 1964), president of the American Enterprise Institute
- William T. Doyle (1926–2024), member of the Vermont Senate from the Washington Vermont Senate District, 1969–2017, the longest-serving state legislator in Vermont history
- Barrows Dunham (1905–1995; class of 1922), author and former head of Philosophy Department at Temple University in Philadelphia

== E ==
- Michael Eisner (born 1942; class of 1960), former CEO of The Walt Disney Company
- William W. Evans Jr. (1921–1999), politician who served in the New Jersey General Assembly 1960–1962; candidate for the Republican nomination for president in 1968

== F ==
- Turki bin Faisal Al Saud (born 1945; class of 1963), Saudi Arabia's ambassador to United States
- Jane Ferguson (born 1984, class of 2004, journalist
- Maurice Ferré (1935–2019; class of 1953), mayor of the city of Miami (1973–1985)
- Sean Flynn (1941–c. 1970), actor; son of Errol Flynn; freelance photojournalist best known for his coverage of the Vietnam War
- Major Sir Hamish Forbes (1916–2007; class of 1934), British Army officer who served in the Welsh Guards during World War II; POW decorated for numerous escape attempts
- Malcolm Forbes (1919–1990; class of 1937), publisher of Forbes magazine
- Clint Frank (1915–1992; class of 1934), winner of the 1937 Heisman Trophy and Maxwell Award; team captain and All-American football player at Yale University
- Charles Fried (1935–2024; class of 1952), Harvard Law School professor and U.S. solicitor general
- N. Howell Furman (1892–1965), professor of analytical chemistry who helped develop the electrochemical uranium separation process as part of the Manhattan Project

== G ==
- George Gallup Jr. (1930–2011; class of 1948), pollster and author
- Roy Geronemus (born 1953; class of 1971), physician and chairman of the board of the New York Stem Cell Foundation
- Irving S. Gilmore (1900–1986), musician, retail businessman and philanthropist
- Robert F. Goheen (1919–2008; class of 1936), 16th president of Princeton University and U.S. ambassador to India
- Peter Gould (class of 1978), television writer and producer
- Billy Granville (born 1974; class of 1992), former Cincinnati Bengals player
- John Cleve Green (1800–1875; class of 1816), merchant
- Samuel D. Gross (1805–1884; attended 1822–1825), academic trauma surgeon
- Peter Johnson Gulick (1796–1877; class of 1822), pioneer Protestant missionary to Hawaii (1828–74) with the American Board of Commissioners for Foreign Missions; patriarch of the missionary-rich (1820s to 1960s) Gulick clan; co-founder of Princeton University's Philadelphian Society of Nassau Hall (1825–1930); spiritual parent to today's Princeton Christian Fellowship)
- William Stryker Gummere (1852–1933; class of 1867), captain of the Princeton football team; chief justice of the Supreme Court of New Jersey
- John Gutfreund (1929–2016; class of 1947), CEO of Salomon Brothers

== H ==
- Richard Halliburton (1900–1939; class of 1917), author, adventurer
- Karen Hao (class of 2011), award-winning journalist
- Randolph Apperson Hearst (1915–2000; class of 1934), chairman of the Hearst Corporation and son of William Randolph Hearst
- Lydia Hearst-Shaw (born 1984; class of 2002), model, daughter of Patricia Hearst
- Lars Hernquist (born 1954; class of 1973), theoretical astrophysicist and Mallinckrodt Professor of Astrophysics at the Harvard-Smithsonian Center for Astrophysics
- Armond Hill (born 1953; class of 1972), former NBA player and assistant coach
- Walter E. Hussman Jr. (born 1947; class of 1964), newspaper publisher and chief executive officer of WEHCO Media, Inc.
- Glenn Hutchins (born 1955; class of 1973), co-founder, Silver Lake Partners

== I ==
- John N. Irwin II (1913–2000), U.S. diplomat and attorney

== J ==
- Owen Johnson (1878–1952; class of 1895), author of Lawrenceville Stories
- Rupert Johnson Jr. (born 1941; class of 1958), vice chairman of Franklin Resources

== K ==
- Genny Kim Knowles (born 2000), Canadian and South Korean ice hockey player
- Joe Kyrillos (born 1960), politician who served in the New Jersey General Assembly, 1988–1992 and the New Jersey Senate, 1992–2018

== L ==
- Duke Lacroix (born 1993; class of 2011), professional soccer player who plays as a forward for Indy Eleven in the North American Soccer League
- Butler Lampson (born 1943; class of 1960), computer scientist; 1992 Turing Award winner
- Mort Landsberg (1919–1970), NFL player
- William M. Lanning (1849–1912; class of 1866), U.S. representative from New Jersey (1903–1904)
- Preston Lea (attended 1859–1860), governor of Delaware (1905–1909)
- Aldo Leopold (1887–1948; class of 1905), father of ecology; author of A Sand County Almanac
- Huey Lewis (born 1950 as Hugh Cregg; class of 1967), musician
- Emily Li (born 1999; class of 2018), musician known as Emei
- Alexander S. Lilley (1867–1925; class of 1888), first head coach of the Ohio State Buckeyes football team
- Ashley Lyle (class of 1998), Emmy Award-nominated showrunner, creator of Yellowjackets

== M ==
- Leonard Mackall (1879–1937; class of 1896), historian
- John Van Antwerp MacMurray (born 1881; class of 1898), diplomat
- Ricardo Maduro (born 1946; class of 1963), former president of Honduras
- Joseph Moncure March (1899–1977), poet
- Reginald Marsh (1898–1954), painter
- William H. Masters (1915–2001; class of 1934), human sexuality researcher and co-founder of the Masters & Johnson Institute
- Curtis McGraw (1895–1953), publisher and president of McGraw-Hill 1950–1953
- Donald C. McGraw (1897–1974; class of 1917), president of McGraw-Hill Companies
- Harold McGraw Jr. (1918–2010; class of 1936), CEO of the McGraw Hill Companies, Inc.
- James M. McIntosh (1828–1862; attended 1837–1840), brigadier general in the Confederate States Army
- John Baillie McIntosh (1829–1888; attended 1837–1840), brigadier general in the Union Army
- James Merrill (1926–1995; class of 1943), Pulitzer Prize winning poet
- Dennis Michie (1870–1898; class of 1888), first football head coach at Army, namesake of Michie Stadium
- Clement Woodnutt Miller (1916–1962), U.S. representative from California
- Chi Modu (1966–2021), photographer known for his photos of various pioneering hip-hop music entertainers
- Paul Moravec (born 1957), 2004 Pulitzer Prize for Music-winning composer
- Roland S. Morris (1874–1945), lawyer and diplomat; co-founded the law firm Duane Morris in 1904; U.S. ambassador to Japan 1917–1920
- Geoff Morrell (class of 1987), former press secretary of the Department of Defense
- Tinsley Mortimer (born 1976), socialite and television personality
- Paul Mott (born 1958), retired professional soccer player for the Tampa Bay Rowdies, sports consultant and former professional sports executive
- Patrick Erin Murphy (born 1983; class of 2002), congressman (D-FL), representing Florida's 18th Congressional District

== N ==
- Nikita Nesterenko (born 2001; class of 2020), professional ice hockey center who plays in the National Hockey League for the Anaheim Ducks
- Grant Newsome (born 1997; class of 2015), college football offensive line coach for the Michigan Wolverines
- Joakim Noah (born 1985; class of 2004), basketball player for the Chicago Bulls

== O ==
- Jarvis Offutt (1894–1918; class of 1913), World War I aviator, namesake of Offutt Air Force Base
- Charles Smith Olden (1799–1876; attended 1810–1814), 19th governor of New Jersey, 1860–1863
- A. Dayton Oliphant (1887–1963), associate justice of the New Jersey Supreme Court 1945–1946, and again 1948–1957

== P ==
- Arthur W. Page (1883–1960), public relations pioneer
- Joel Parker (1816–1888; attended 1834–1837), 20th governor of New Jersey, 1863–66 and 1871–74
- Stacey Patton (born 1978; class of 1996), journalist, author and child advocate
- Albert Pennoyer (1888–1957), artist and Monuments Man during World War II
- Paul Pennoyer Sr. (1890–1971), lawyer and diplomat, veteran of both world wars
- Horace Porter (1837–1921; class of 1854), Union Army brigadier general who was awarded the Medal of Honor
- Rodman M. Price (1816–1894; attended 1834–1837), represented New Jersey's 5th congressional district in the United States House of Representatives 1851–1853; 17th governor of New Jersey 1854–1857

== R ==
- Jim Rash (born 1971; class of 1990), actor; winner of the 2012 Oscar for best adapted screenplay (The Descendants); Dean Pelton on NBC's Community
- Andrew Horatio Reeder (attended 1822–1825), first governor of the Kansas Territory (1854–55)
- Laurence A. Rickels (born 1954), theorist and philosopher, known for his work on vampires, the devil, technology and science fiction
- William P. Ross (1820–1891; attended 1837–40), principal chief of the Cherokee Nation
- Bob Ryan (born 1946; class of 1964), sportswriter for The Boston Globe; ESPN analyst and contributor

== S ==
- Bobby Sanguinetti (born 1988; class of 2006), professional ice hockey defenseman for HC Lugano in the National League; left school after his sophomore year after being selected in the 2006 NHL entry draft
- Julian Larcombe Schley (class of 1898), governor of the Panama Canal Zone (1932–1936)
- Paul Schmidtberger (class of 1982), author of Design Flaws of the Human Condition
- Gene Scott (1937–2006; class of 1956), tennis player and founder of Tennis Week magazine
- Hugh L. Scott (1853–1934; class of 1869), chief of staff of the United States Army and superintendent of the United States Military Academy (West Point)
- Charles Scribner I (attended 1834–1837), publisher and founder of Charles Scribner's Sons
- Chip Smith (class of 1986), businessman, political strategist
- Cotter Smith (born 1949; class of 1968), actor
- Sheridan Snyder (class of 1954), biotechnology entrepreneur and philanthropist
- Fred Mustard Stewart (1932–2007; class of 1950), novelist
- William H. Stovall (1895–1970; class of 1913), World War I flying ace; World War II veteran; businessman
- Bandar bin Sultan (born 1945), Saudi Arabia's ambassador to the United States 1983–2005

== T ==
- Brandon Tartikoff (1949–1997; class of 1966), NBC programming chief
- Henry J. Taylor (1902–1984; class of 1920), journalist, author, and U.S. ambassador to Switzerland 1957–1961
- Buddy Temple (born 1942), lumber magnate and former politician from Lufkin, Texas
- Taki Theodoracopulos (born 1936), international journalist
- Randall Thompson (1899–1984), music composer and director of the Curtis Institute 1939–1941
- Samuel Huston Thompson (1875–1966), chair of the Federal Trade Commission 1919–1927
- Orlando E. Toledo (born 1964), philosopher, writer
- Joseph Tsai (born 1964; class of 1982), vice chairman of Alibaba Group

== W ==
- Frederic C. Walcott (1869–1949; class of 1886), U.S. senator from Connecticut (1929–1935)
- Rawleigh Warner Jr. (1921–2013), president and CEO of Mobil
- Lowell Weicker (1931–2023; class of 1949), governor of Connecticut and U.S. senator
- Alex Westlund (born 1975), retired professional ice hockey goaltender who has since been a coach
- Meredith Whitney (born 1969; class of 1988), former research analyst at Oppenheimer
- J. Harvie Wilkinson III (born 1944), United States Court of Appeals, Fourth Circuit
- Brian Willison (born 1977; class of 1995), businessman
- Alfred Alexander Woodhull (class of 1852), brigadier general and Army surgeon
- J. Butler Wright (1877–1939; class of 1895), diplomat; U.S. representative in Hungary, Uruguay, Czechoslovakia and Cuba

== Y ==
- Welly Yang (born 1973; class of 1990), actor
- Monica Yunus (born 1977; class of 1995), operatic soprano in the Metropolitan Opera
