= Hitz (disambiguation) =

Hitz is an American comedy television series.

Hitz may also refer to:

- Hitz (1992 film), a 1992 film by William Sachs, also known as Judgement
- "Hitz" (song), a 2011 song by Chase & Status
- Hitz (radio station), a Malaysian pop radio station
- Hitz (surname)
- Hitz Radio, defunct UK internet radio station

== See also ==
- Hits (disambiguation)
- NHL Hitz (disambiguation), a series of ice hockey video games
