= Victor Shafferman =

Real estate investor (1941–2009)

Victor Shafferman (November 8, 1941 – October 19, 2009) was a real estate investor.

== Early life ==
Shafferman was born in Israel, where his father was Ben Shafferman, a wealthy diamond merchant who moved to Canada after World War II. He would claim that he was born in Switzerland and that his family owned the CIBA-Geigy pharmaceutical company.

He attended McGill University, in Montreal, Quebec.

== Maison Joseph Lamoureux ==
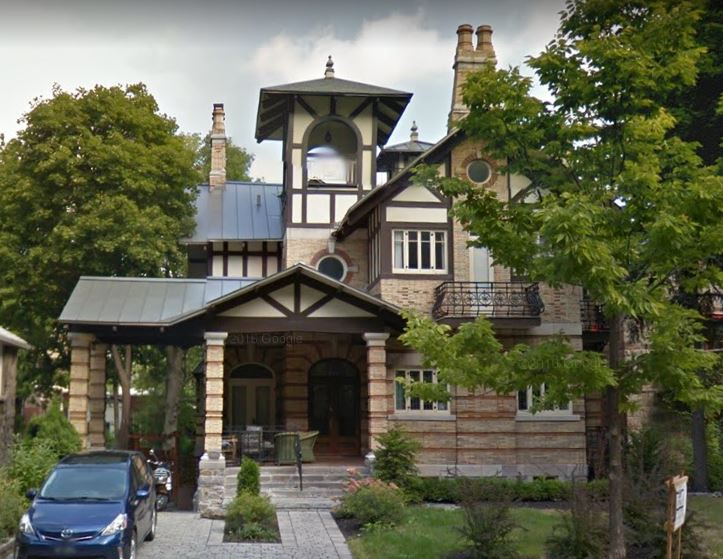
Maison Joseph Lamoureux

Shafferman's family home in Montreal was the Maison Joseph Lamoureux at 143 chemin de la Côte-Sainte-Catherine. Before moving to 143 St Catherine Road the family lived at 711 Stuart Avenue. Ben Shafferman bought the Maison Lamoureux in 1963. His son Victor Shafferman lived there while studying at McGill University, and inherited it at the death of his mother in 2000. At Shafferman's death in 2009, his spouse sold all the couple's residences, including the Maison Lamoureux. This residence known as Maison Joseph Lamoureux, who built it in 1898, is the work of the architect Joseph-Arthur Godin. Godin left in Montreal a diverse architectural heritage. He is also the architect of the Académie Querbes, churches and theaters like Théâtre La Tulipe (the former Théâtre des Variétés) and the Joseph-Arthur Godin House (today the Hôtel Godin, corner Sherbrooke and Saint-Laurent).

== 973 Fifth Avenue ==
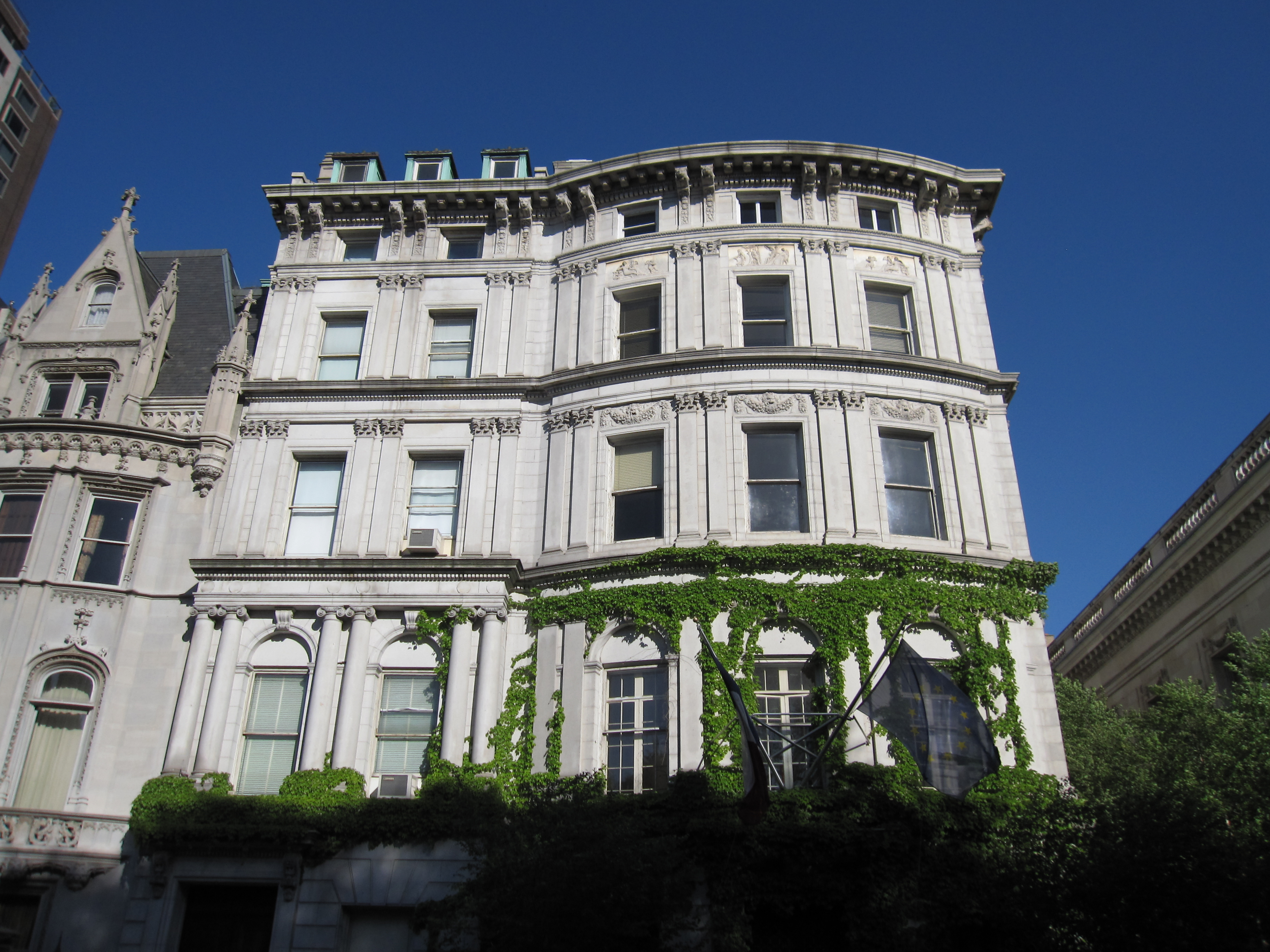
973 and 972 Fifth Avenue

Victor Shafferman owned 973 Fifth Avenue, Manhattan, designed by architectural firm McKim, Mead & White (together with nearby Payne Whitney House). The house was built by Henry Cook in 1902, who owned the entire block from 78th to 79th Streets. He left it to his daughter who sold it to Joseph Feder. In 1948 it was sold to the Church of Jesus Christ of Latter-day Saints and used as a training center. In 1978 it was bought by Shafferman for $600,000 (the equivalent of $2,333,000 in 2017 dollars). It was sold in 2012 for $42 million.

== Blairsden ==
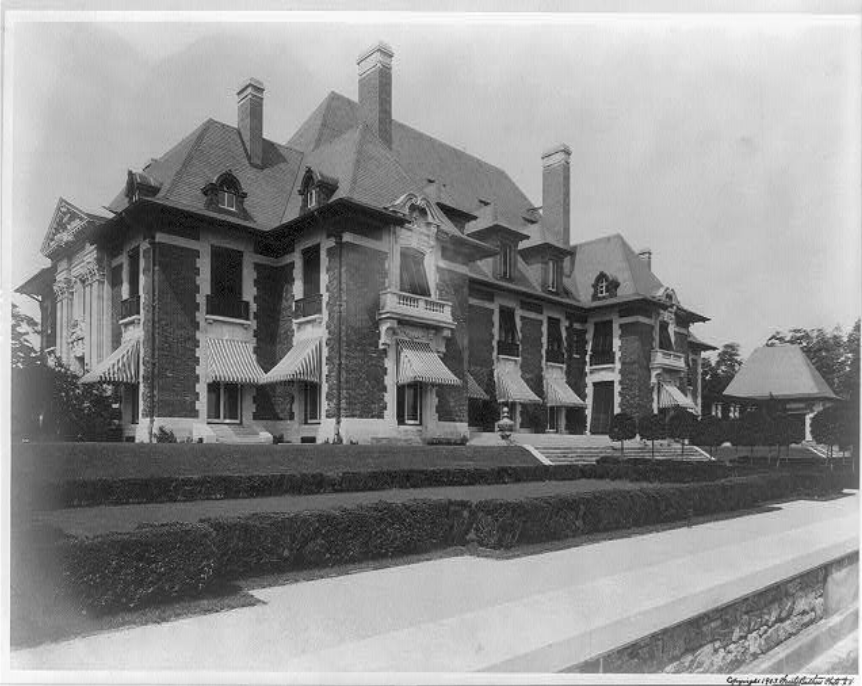
Blairsden

In the early 2000s Shafferman started a relationship with an architectural student, a man much younger than him. Around the same time he bought Blairsden, a mansion located at Peapack-Gladstone, New Jersey, designed by architectural firm Carrère and Hastings. The house was built in 1807 by investment banker C. Ledyard Blair and in 1950 sold to the Sisters of St. John the Baptist. The sisters sold it in 2002 to the Foundation for Classical Architecture owned by Shafferman. Shafferman and his partner started the restoration of the mansion, but Shafferman died before restoration was complete and the mansion was later sold in 2012 for $4.5 million.

== The Diamond District ==
Shafferman was the longtime owner of two buildings, 15 West 47th Street and 22 West 48th Street, in what is called the Diamond District. They were put on the market in 2012 for an asking price of $115 million.

== Personal life ==
Shafferman moved in the New York High Society. In 1986 he was the date of fashion designer Mary McFadden when she attended the 35th Annual April In Paris Ball at the Waldorf Hotel.

When in 2002 Princess Michael of Kent was in New York to lecture at the Metropolitan Museum of Art, Lee Thaw organized a dinner at Swifty's and among the twenty, selected, guests, there was Shafferman. Other guests were: Patricia Buckley, Consuelo Crespi, Olga Rostropovich (daughter of Mstislav Rostropovich), Marguerite Litman (a noted London hostess), Countess Elizabeth von Habsburg, Kartica Soekarno, John Richardson, Archduke Geza von Habsburg, Kenny Lane, Pete Hathaway, Toto Bergamo, Larry Lovett, Pierre Durand, Alex Hitz, Alexander Apsis, Sebastian Thaw, Victor Barcimento.

In 2008 he attended the Venetian Heritage Event honoring Larry Lovett at the St. Regis Hotel; he is photographed talking with Gaetana Enders.

Shafferman died on October 19, 2009, of pancreatic cancer.
