= Blairsden =

Blairsden may refer to:

- Blairsden, California
- Blairsden, a mansion in Peapack-Gladstone, New Jersey
