= Edgar L. Marston =

American banker industrialist and philanthropist

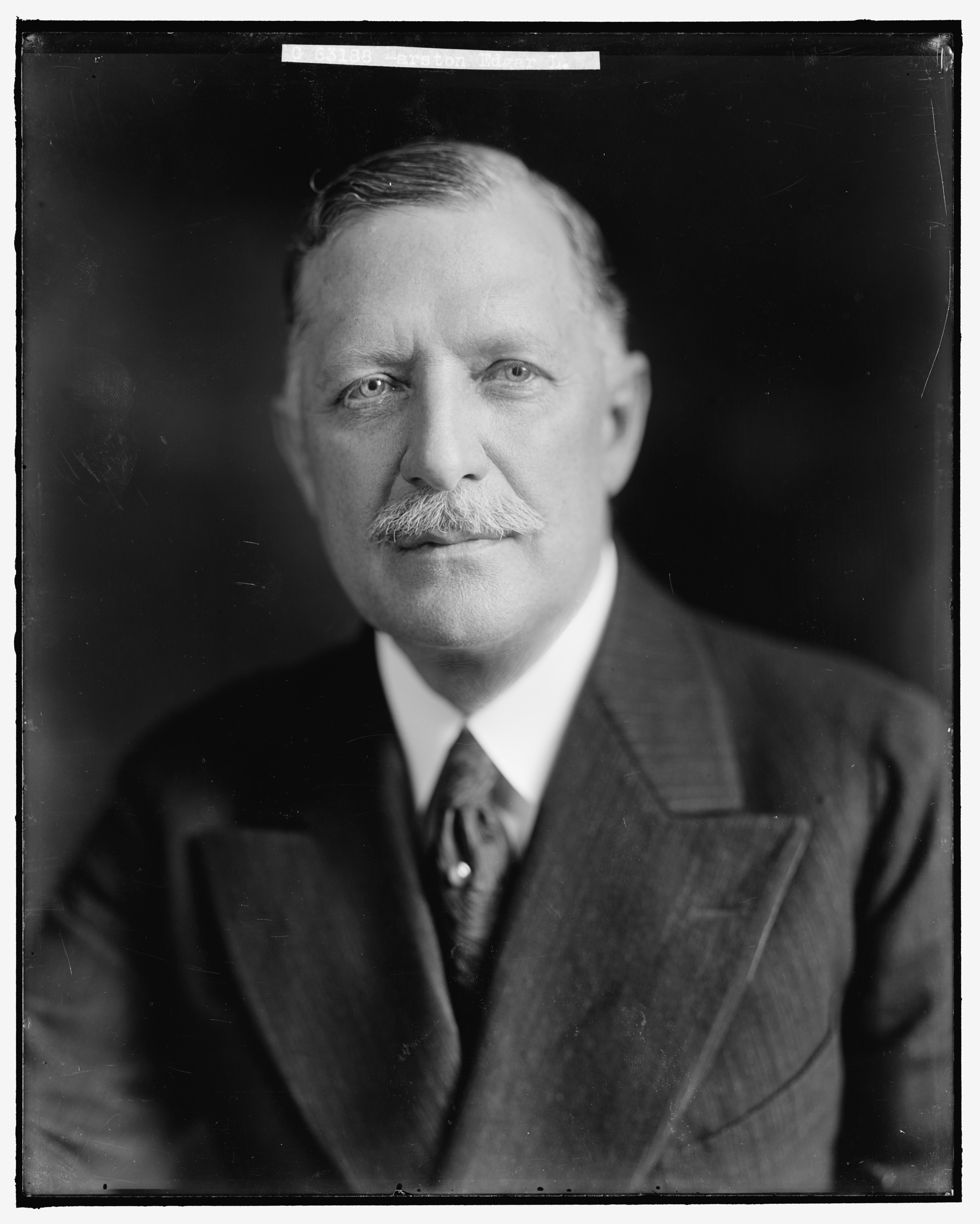
- Born: Edgar Lewis Marston; March 8, 1860; Burlington, Iowa, U.S.
- Died: September 23, 1935 (aged 75); Los Angeles, California, U.S.
- Education: LeGrange College; Washington University in St. Louis
- Spouses: Jennifer Colorado Hunter (m. 1884; died 1923) Anne Mae Treadway Ellis (m. 1925)
- Children: 3

Edgar Lewis Marston (March 8, 1860 – September 23, 1935) was an American banker, industrialist and philanthropist.

== Early life and education ==
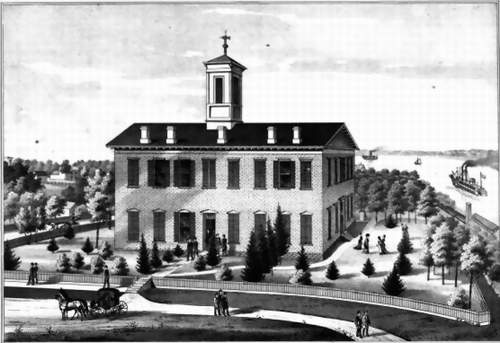
A mid-1870s sketch of Marston's alma mater, LeGrange College

Marston was born on March 8, 1860, in Burlington in Des Moines County, Iowa. He was a son of Susan Hodson (née Carpenter) Marston and the Rev. Sylvester W. Marston, a prominent Baptist clergyman and educator who moved the family from Iowa to St. Louis, Missouri, in 1868 where he was secretary of the Baptist Home Missionary Society. Both of his parents were born in Newfield, Maine.

He graduated from LeGrange College in 1878, followed by Washington University School of Law in 1881.

== Career ==
After graduation from Law School, Marston practiced law in St. Louis for several years before moving to Texas where he was connected with the building of the oil industry in the United States. He joined his father-in-law's firm, Hunter, Evans & Co. In 1888, he helped organize the Texas Pacific Coal Company, which became the Texas Pacific Coal and Oil Company, and established his fortune. (Note: The Texas Pacific Coal and Oil Company was later bought by Samuel Bronfman in 1963 for $50 million. His heirs eventually sold it to the Sun Oil Co. in 1980 for $2.3 billion.) In Texas, he was credited with founding several important oil developments, including the Ranger field (which became one of the leading oil producing fields in Texas) and the McClesky well which began flowing in October 1917. He also served as Chairman of the Executive Committee of the Clinchfield Coal Company and was a director of the Davis Coal and Coke Company.

In 1890, Marston joined DeWitt Clinton Blair and his family's New York bank and prominent stock brokerage house Blair & Co., as head of the bond department, before becoming a partner in 1893. The firm's primary business was managing the railroad interests linked to the Gould family and it underwrote a $50 million bond issue of the Western Pacific Railroad and helped in the financial management of the Denver and Rio Grande Western Railroad and the Western Maryland Railroad. In 1901, Marston was arraigned for illegal registration due to his relocation from the Bronx to Port Chester. In April 1920, Blair & Co. dissolved after merging with William Salomon & Co. (under the name of Blair & Co., Inc.). C. Ledyard Blair was named chairman of the board of directors, and Blair, Dennis, and Marston owned 48%, 30% and 22%, respectively, of the predecessor firm. In 1923, Marston retired from the firm, which merged with Bank of America in 1929, forming Bancamerica-Blair Corporation (later owned by Transamerica Corporation).

In 1919, he was one of two representatives of investment bankers at the National Industrial Conference Board, which met in Washington, D.C. He also served as a director of the Astor Trust Company and the Bankers Trust.

== Personal life ==
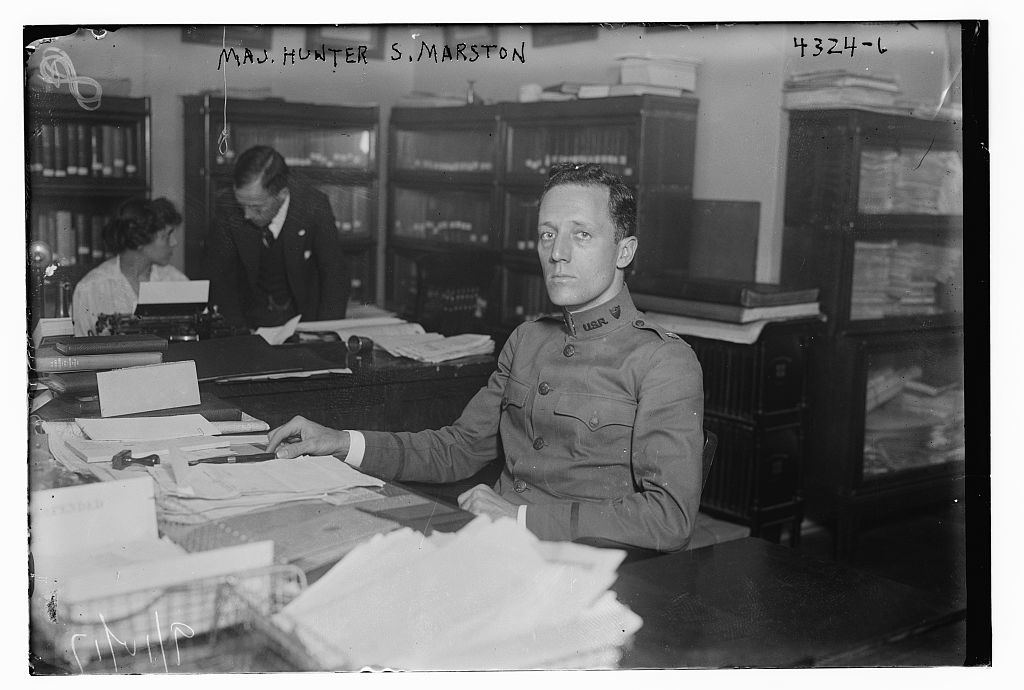
Marston's son, Maj. Hunter S. Marston, c. 1915–1920

On June 4, 1884, Marston was married to Jennifer Colorado "Jennie" Hunter (1865–1923). Jennie was the daughter of Col. Robert Dickie Hunter. They had a home in Port Chester, New York, known as Glen Airlie. Together, they were the parents of:

- Hunter Sylvester Marston (1885–1979), who served as president of the Bancamerica-Blair Corporation and was a founder of the American Home Products Corporation and the Dixie Cup Company, which was acquired by the American Can Company. He married Mary Ann Vandehoef (1886–1978), the cousin of Frances Vanderhoef Heckscher (mother of August Heckscher II), in 1909.
- Edgar Jean Marston (1888–1962), who served as president of the Texas Pacific Coal and Oil Company. He married Margaret Buckelew Helme (1891–1965) on November 15, 1911, and moved to La Jolla in 1955.
- Jennie Frances "Jane" Marston (1899–1982), who married Robert J. Adams (son of the chewing gum manufacturer) in 1917. They divorced in 1919 and she married John Clark Burgard in 1922. She later married singer and actor Lawrence Tibbett in 1932. After his death in 1960, she married photographer John Bingham in 1961.

After his first wife's death in Rye, New York, on December 8, 1923, he married Anne Mae (née Treadway) Ellis (1886–1953), the former wife of James Herbert Ellis, on November 10, 1925.

Marston died at the Ambassador Hotel in Los Angeles, California, on September 23, 1935. He was buried at Bellefontaine Cemetery in St. Louis.

=== Philanthropy ===
In 1919, Marston donated $150,000 to Brown University for a modern language building, which was named Marston Hall in his honor. Marston's son Hunter was a graduate of Brown and the elder Marston served as a trustee of the University and endowed several scholarships. He also served as a trustee of Vassar College in Poughkeepsie, New York. In 1966, with funds donated by Hunter, the University purchased a boathouse for the Brown University Rowing Team which it dedicated on October 7, 1967, as the "Hunter S. Marston Boathouse."
