= Hitz (surname) =

Hitz is a surname. Notable people with the surname include:

- Alex Hitz (born 1969), American chef
- David Hitz, American engineer
- Franz Hitz (1828–1891), Swiss pianist and composer
- Frederick Hitz (born 1939), former Inspector General of the CIA
- Hans Jakob Hitz (born 1949), German slalom canoeist
- Jason Hitz (born 1980), Zimbabwean cricketer
- Marwin Hitz (born 1987), Swiss football goalkeeper
- Ralph Hitz (1891–1940), Vienna-born American hotel manager
- Sarina Hitz (born 2000), Swiss sports shooter
- William Hitz (1872–1935), American federal judge
