= Foul Rift, New Jersey =

Populated place in Warren County, New Jersey, US

- Unincorporated community
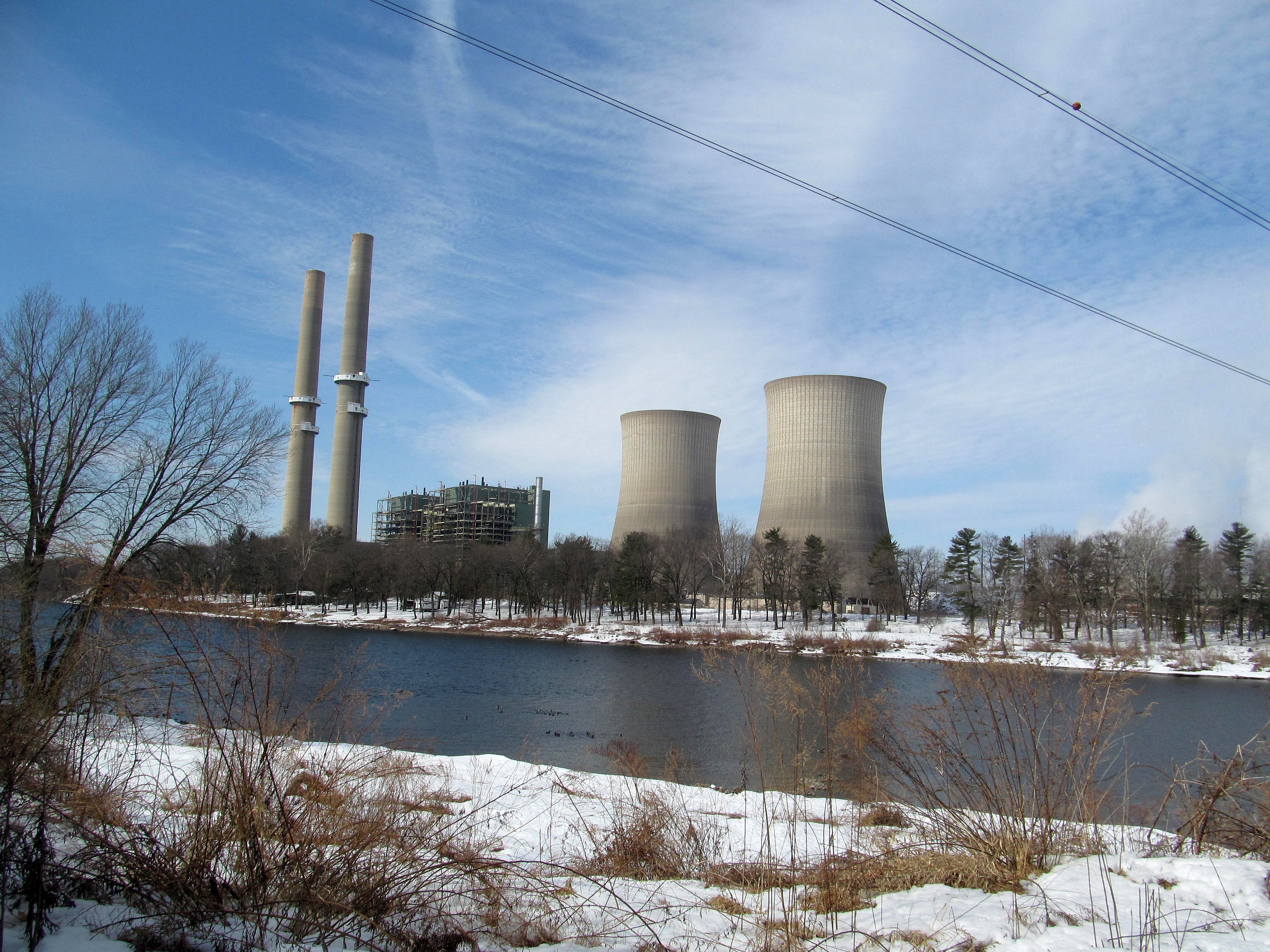
- View of Martins Creek Power Station and the Delaware River from the south end of Foul Rift

- Location of Foul Rift in Warren County Inset: Location of county within the state of New Jersey Foul Rift, New Jersey (New Jersey) Foul Rift, New Jersey (the United States)
- Coordinates: 40°48′08″N 75°05′52″W
- Country: United States
- State: New Jersey
- County: Warren
- Township: White
- Elevation: 239 ft (73 m)
- Time zone: UTC−05:00 (Eastern (EST))
  - Summer (DST): UTC−04:00 (EDT)
- GNIS feature ID: 876430

Foul Rift is an unincorporated community and one-time ghost town located within White Township, in Warren County, in the U.S. state of New Jersey. Foul Rift had been a cottage community located on the east bank of the Delaware River, 2 mi (3.2 km) south of Belvidere.

== History ==
Foul Rift was named after the rapids along that stretch of the Delaware River. The community began as campsites, and grew to include summer cottages and year-round rental cottages.

A tract of 1,735 acres (702 ha) was surveyed to William Penn, "extending from the foot of Foul Rift to Hutchison's". Early settlers to Foul Rift purchased land from Penn's heirs in 1740. The Rifton Mills were built there in 1814 in order to harness the fast flowing water at Foul Rift. In 1856, the mills were destroyed by fire.

Between 2004 and 2006, a series of floods destroyed 24 cottages in Foul Rift. The remaining four cottages, owned by PPL Corporation, were removed in 2008.

== Notable people ==
- John Insley Blair, entrepreneur, railroad magnate, philanthropist and one of the 19th century's wealthiest men.
