= DeWitt Clinton Blair =

American businessman

- Born: September 6, 1833; Gravel Hill, New Jersey, U.S.
- Died: June 3, 1915 (aged 81); New York City, New York, U.S.
- Education: Princeton University
- Spouse: Mary Anna Kimball (after 1864)
- Children: Clinton Ledyard Blair; James Insley Blair
- Parent(s): John Insley Blair; Nancy Ann Locke Blair

DeWitt Clinton Blair (September 6, 1833 – June 3, 1915) was an American philanthropist and industrialist.

== Early life ==
Blair was born in Gravel Hill, New Jersey (later renamed Blairstown) on September 6, 1833. He was the son of entrepreneur and railroad magnate John Insley Blair and, his wife, Nancy Ann (née Locke) Blair (1804–1888), a granddaughter of Captain Locke, who was "killed at the battle of Springfield during the revolution." Among his siblings was Emma Elizabeth Blair (wife of publisher Charles Scribner I), Marcus Laurence Blair, and Aurelia Ann Blair (wife of Clarence Green Mitchell).

He graduated from Princeton University with the class of 1856, and later served as a Princeton trustee from 1900 to 1909 and was instrumental in expanding the campus and buildings (Insley, East and Locke) of Blair Presbyterian Academy. In 1907, Blair contributed towards the expansion of Blair Hall at Princeton, which had originally been built with his father's donation to the school.

== Career ==
Blair continued his father's varied business interests and philanthropy and was partners in Blair & Co. with Edgar L. Marston.

== Personal life ==
On April 21, 1864, he married Mary Anna Kimball (1837–1914) with whom he had three sons, two of whom survived to adulthood:

- John Insley Blair (1865–1866), who died in infancy.
- Clinton Ledyard Blair (1867–1949), who married Florence Osborne Jennings. After her death, he married Harriet Stewart Brown.
- James Insley Blair (1876–1939), who married Natalie Bennett Knowlton (1883–1951), the daughter of Danforth Henry Knowlton.

The Blair Estate, in Belvidere, New Jersey, was built in 1865 and purchased by Blair in 1867. The estate was purchased by the Presbyterian Synod of New Jersey for use as an old-age home. Warren County purchased the site in 1970, which is now used for the Warren County Library and other county offices.

Less than a year after the passing of his wife Mary Anna on February 12, 1914, Blair died on June 3, 1915, at the age of 81, at his home, 6 East 61st Street in New York City. After a funeral at his New York residence, he was buried at Green-Wood Cemetery in Brooklyn.
