= White Township, New Jersey =

Township in Warren County, New Jersey, US

- Township
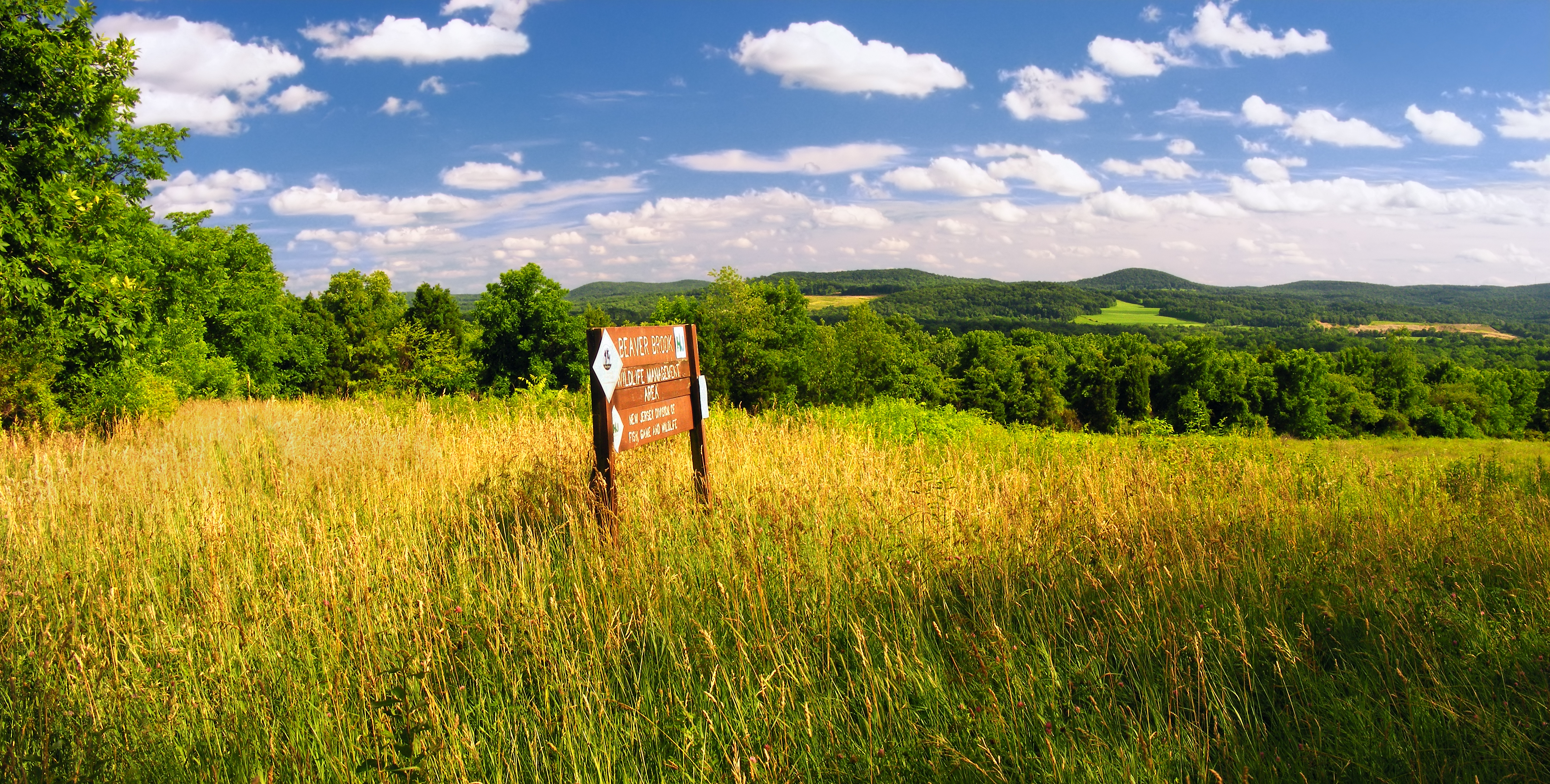
- Beaver Brook Wildlife Management Area in White Township in July 2009

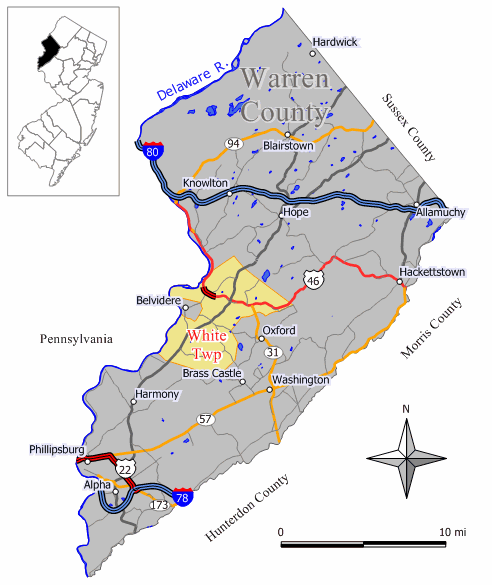
- Location of White Township in Warren County highlighted in yellow (right). Inset map: Location of Warren County in New Jersey highlighted in black (left).

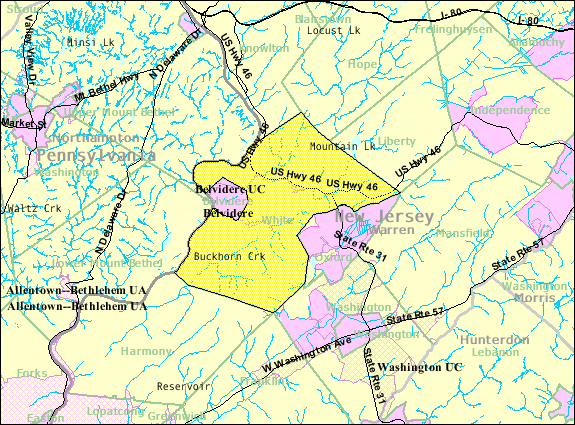
- Census Bureau map of White Township, New Jersey

- Location in Warren County Location in New Jersey Location in the United States
- Coordinates: 40.821198°N 75.030502°W
- Country: United States
- State: New Jersey
- County: Warren
- Incorporated: April 9, 1913
- Named for: Alexander White

Government
  - Type: Township
  - Body: Township Council
  - Mayor: Anna Marie Skoog (R, term ends December 31, 2023)
  - Municipal clerk: Kathleen R. Reinalda

Area
  - Total: 27.90 sq mi (72.27 km^{2})
  - Land: 27.37 sq mi (70.88 km^{2})
  - Water: 0.54 sq mi (1.39 km^{2}) 1.92%
  - Rank: 97th of 565 in state 4th of 22 in county
- Elevation: 525 ft (160 m)

Population (2020)
  - Total: 4,606
  - Estimate (2023): 4,704
  - Rank: 393rd of 565 in state 11th of 22 in county
  - Density: 168.3/sq mi (65.0/km^{2})
  - Rank: 515th of 565 in state 16th of 22 in county
- Time zone: UTC−05:00 (Eastern (EST))
  - Summer (DST): UTC−04:00 (Eastern (EDT))
- ZIP Code: 07823 – Belvidere
- Area code: 908
- FIPS code: 3404180570
- GNIS feature ID: 0882246
- Website: www.white-township.com

White Township is a township in Warren County, in the U.S. state of New Jersey. As of the 2020 United States census, the township's population was 4,606, a decrease of 276 (−5.7%) from the 2010 census count of 4,882, which in turn reflected an increase of 637 (+15.0%) from the 4,245 counted in the 2000 census.

White Township was incorporated as a township by an act of the New Jersey Legislature on April 9, 1913, from portions of Oxford Township, based on the results of a referendum held on May 1, 1913, making it the second-youngest township in the county.

== History ==
The township was named after Alexander White I, who came to the area sometime before 1760 and built a stone mansion called "White Hall".In 1762 the wife of Alexander, Mary McMurtrie's father Joseph McMurtrie died. In his will he gave his children his lands, in (part) the will states, "Mary shall build at the springs, at the line under little hill and have it for her lifetime". The couple would build their stone mansion there, and it would go-on to be described as " the most formidable dwelling", and "most enduring monument to colonial times" in Warren County. General George Washington and William Henry Harrison stopped at "White Hall" on their way back from the Sun Inn, in Bethlehem, Pennsylvania, to Washington's encampment in Morristown. William Henry Harrison delivered a presidential campaign speech from the balcony. White Hall would burned down in 1924.

== Geography ==
According to the United States Census Bureau, the township had a total area of 27.90 square miles (72.27 km^{2}), including 27.37 square miles (70.88 km^{2}) of land and 0.54 square miles (1.39 km^{2}) of water (1.92%). The township is located in the Kittatinny Valley which is a section of the Great Appalachian Valley that stretches for 700 miles (1,100 km) from Canada to Alabama.

Bridgeville (with a 2020 Census population of 229), Brookfield (727) and Buttzville (205) are census-designated places and unincorporated communities located within the township.

Other unincorporated communities, localities and place names located partially or completely within the township include Cornish, Foul Rift, Hazen, Little York, Manunka Chunk, Sarepta and Summerfield.

Mount No More is a mountain that is part of the New York–New Jersey Highlands of the Appalachian Mountains. The summit rises to 1,142 feet (348 m).

White Township borders the Warren County municipalities of Belvidere, Harmony Township, Hope Township, Knowlton Township, Liberty Township, Oxford Township and Washington Township.

== Demographics ==
Historical population
Census	Pop.	Note	%±
1920	1,161		—
1930	1,200		3.4%
1940	1,335		11.3%
1950	1,536		15.1%
1960	1,832		19.3%
1970	2,326		27.0%
1980	2,748		18.1%
1990	3,603		31.1%
2000	4,245		17.8%
2010	4,882		15.0%
2020	4,606		−5.7%
2023 (est.)	4,704		2.1%
Population sources: 1920; 1920–1930 1940–2000; 2000 2010 2020

The Township's economic data (as is all of Warren County) is calculated by the US Census Bureau as part of the Lehigh Valley / Allentown-Bethlehem-Easton, PA-NJ metropolitan statistical area.

=== 2010 census ===
The 2010 United States census counted 4,882 people, 2,115 households, and 1,328 families in the township. The population density was 179.8 inhabitants per square mile (69.4/km^{2}). There were 2,304 housing units at an average density of 84.9 per square mile (32.8/km^{2}). The racial makeup was 95.33% (4,654) White, 2.03% (99) Black or African American, 0.08% (4) Native American, 0.76% (37) Asian, 0.02% (1) Pacific Islander, 0.78% (38) from other races, and 1.00% (49) from two or more races. Hispanic or Latino of any race were 2.74% (134) of the population.

Of the 2,115 households, 19.8% had children under the age of 18; 53.3% were married couples living together; 6.4% had a female householder with no husband present and 37.2% were non-families. Of all households, 33.5% were made up of individuals and 22.4% had someone living alone who was 65 years of age or older. The average household size was 2.23 and the average family size was 2.84.

17.0% of the population were under the age of 18, 6.4% from 18 to 24, 16.7% from 25 to 44, 31.0% from 45 to 64, and 28.9% who were 65 years of age or older. The median age was 50.9 years. For every 100 females, the population had 93.9 males. For every 100 females ages 18 and older there were 91.8 males.

The Census Bureau's 2006–2010 American Community Survey showed that (in 2010 inflation-adjusted dollars) median household income was $68,247 (with a margin of error of +/− $5,170) and the median family income was $81,975 (+/− $7,157). Males had a median income of $57,222 (+/− $15,520) versus $49,022 (+/− $7,746) for females. The per capita income for the borough was $36,964 (+/− $3,448). About 4.2% of families and 4.0% of the population were below the poverty line, including 2.4% of those under age 18 and 3.8% of those age 65 or over.

=== 2000 census ===
As of the 2000 United States census there were 4,245 people, 1,668 households, and 1,179 families residing in the township. The population density was 155.1 inhabitants per square mile (59.9/km^{2}). There were 1,770 housing units at an average density of 64.7 per square mile (25.0/km^{2}). The racial makeup of the township was 96.35% White, 1.20% African American, 0.19% Native American, 0.61% Asian, 0.05% Pacific Islander, 0.33% from other races, and 1.27% from two or more races. Hispanic or Latino of any race were 2.12% of the population.

There were 1,668 households, out of which 28.2% had children under the age of 18 living with them, 60.6% were married couples living together, 7.0% had a female householder with no husband present, and 29.3% were non-families. 25.2% of all households were made up of individuals, and 13.8% had someone living alone who was 65 years of age or older. The average household size was 2.47 and the average family size was 2.98.

In the township the population was spread out, with 22.3% under the age of 18, 5.7% from 18 to 24, 28.2% from 25 to 44, 25.6% from 45 to 64, and 18.2% who were 65 years of age or older. The median age was 42 years. For every 100 females, there were 100.1 males. For every 100 females age 18 and over, there were 98.0 males.

The median income for a household in the township was $54,732, and the median income for a family was $66,127. Males had a median income of $49,044 versus $35,000 for females. The per capita income for the township was $24,783. About 2.2% of families and 4.9% of the population were below the poverty line, including 3.6% of those under age 18 and 4.8% of those age 65 or over.

== Government ==
=== Local government ===
White Township is governed under the Township form of New Jersey municipal government, one of 141 municipalities (of the 564) statewide that use this form, the second-most commonly used form of government in the state. The governing body is comprised of a three-member Township Committee, whose members are elected directly by the voters at-large in partisan elections to serve three-year terms of office on a staggered basis, with one or seat coming up for election each year as part of the November general election in a three-year cycle. At an annual reorganization meeting, the Township Committee selects one of its members to serve as Mayor.

As of 2023, members of the White Township Committee are Mayor Anna Marie Skoog (R, term on committee and as mayor ends December 31, 2023), Deputy Mayor Arnold Hyndman (R, term on committee ends 2024; term as deputy mayor ends 2023) and Jeff Herb (R, 2025).

=== Federal, state, and county representation ===
White Township is located in the 7th Congressional District and is part of New Jersey's 23rd state legislative district.

For the 119th United States Congress, New Jersey's 7th congressional district is represented by Thomas Kean Jr. (R, Westfield). New Jersey is represented in the United States Senate by Democrats Cory Booker (Newark, term ends 2027) and Andy Kim (Moorestown, term ends 2031).

For the 2026–2027 session, the 23rd legislative district of the New Jersey Legislature is represented in the State Senate by Doug Steinhardt (R, Lopatcong Township) and in the General Assembly by John DiMaio (R, Hackettstown) and Erik Peterson (R, Franklin Township).

Warren County is governed by a three-member Board of County Commissioners, who are chosen at-large on a staggered basis in partisan elections with one seat coming up for election each year as part of the November general election. At an annual reorganization meeting held in the beginning of January, the board selects one of its members to serve as Commissioner Director and other as Deputy Director. As of 2025, Warren County's Commissioners are:

Deputy Director Jason J. Sarnoski (R, Lopatcong Township; 2025), Lori Ciesla (R, Lopatcong Township; 2026), and Director James R. Kern III (R, Pohatcong Township; 2027).

Constitutional officers of Warren County are: Clerk Holly Mackey (R, Alpha; 2027), Sheriff James McDonald Sr. (R, Phillipsburg; 2025) and Surrogate Michael J. Doherty (R, Washington; 2025).

=== Politics ===
As of March 2011, there were a total of 3,355 registered voters in White Township, of which 545 (16.2% vs. 21.5% countywide) were registered as Democrats, 1,727 (51.5% vs. 35.3%) were registered as Republicans and 1,077 (32.1% vs. 43.1%) were registered as Unaffiliated. There were 6 voters registered as Libertarians or Greens. Among the township's 2010 Census population, 68.7% (vs. 62.3% in Warren County) were registered to vote, including 82.8% of those ages 18 and over (vs. 81.5% countywide). In the 2012 presidential election, Republican Mitt Romney received 1,540 votes here (65.8% vs. 56.0% countywide), ahead of Democrat Barack Obama with 722 votes (30.9% vs. 40.8%) and other candidates with 38 votes (1.6% vs. 1.7%), among the 2,340 ballots cast by the township's 3,383 registered voters, for a turnout of 69.2% (vs. 66.7% in Warren County).

Gubernatorial election results for White Township
Year	Republican		Democratic		Third party(ies)	
Year	No.	%	No.	%	No.	%
2025	1,565	67.60%	735	31.75%	15	0.65%
2021	1,444	70.40%	562	27.40%	45	2.19%
2017	1,116	71.54%	386	24.74%	58	3.72%
2013	1,165	79.31%	261	17.77%	43	2.93%
2009	1,189	63.82%	440	23.62%	234	12.56%
2005	1,250	62.69%	634	31.80%	110	5.52%

In the 2012 presidential election, Republican Mitt Romney received 67.0% of the vote (1,540 cast), ahead of Democrat Barack Obama with 31.4% (722 votes), and other candidates with 1.7% (38 votes), among the 2,340 ballots cast by the township's 3,383 registered voters (40 ballots were spoiled), for a turnout of 69.2%. In the 2008 presidential election, Republican John McCain received 1,636 votes (61.6% vs. 55.2% countywide), ahead of Democrat Barack Obama with 891 votes (33.5% vs. 41.4%) and other candidates with 50 votes (1.9% vs. 1.6%), among the 2,656 ballots cast by the township's 3,431 registered voters, for a turnout of 77.4% (vs. 73.4% in Warren County). In the 2004 presidential election, Republican George W. Bush received 1,690 votes (64.6% vs. 61.0% countywide), ahead of Democrat John Kerry with 871 votes (33.3% vs. 37.2%) and other candidates with 44 votes (1.7% vs. 1.3%), among the 2,618 ballots cast by the township's 3,255 registered voters, for a turnout of 80.4% (vs. 76.3% in the whole county).

United States presidential election results for White Township
Year	Republican		Democratic		Third party(ies)	
Year	No.	%	No.	%	No.	%
2024	2,035	68.75%	893	30.17%	32	1.08%
2020	1,990	66.80%	941	31.59%	48	1.61%
2016	1,772	69.00%	704	27.41%	92	3.58%
2012	1,540	66.96%	722	31.39%	38	1.65%
2008	1,636	63.48%	891	34.58%	50	1.94%
2004	1,690	64.88%	871	33.44%	44	1.69%

In the 2013 gubernatorial election, Republican Chris Christie received 79.3% of the vote (1,165 cast), ahead of Democrat Barbara Buono with 17.8% (261 votes), and other candidates with 2.9% (43 votes), among the 1,515 ballots cast by the township's 3,417 registered voters (46 ballots were spoiled), for a turnout of 44.3%. In the 2009 gubernatorial election, Republican Chris Christie received 1,189 votes here (62.6% vs. 61.3% countywide), ahead of Democrat Jon Corzine with 440 votes (23.2% vs. 25.7%), Independent Chris Daggett with 210 votes (11.1% vs. 9.8%) and other candidates with 24 votes (1.3% vs. 1.5%), among the 1,899 ballots cast by the township's 3,349 registered voters, yielding a 56.7% turnout (vs. 49.6% in the county).

United States Senate election results for White Township1
Year	Republican		Democratic		Third party(ies)	
Year	No.	%	No.	%	No.	%
2024	1,962	68.08%	868	30.12%	52	1.80%
2018	1,355	68.50%	539	27.25%	84	4.25%
2012	1,391	63.92%	752	34.56%	33	1.52%
2006	1,066	43.07%	1,306	52.77%	103	4.16%

United States Senate election results for White Township2
Year	Republican		Democratic		Third party(ies)	
Year	No.	%	No.	%	No.	%
2020	1,941	66.13%	910	31.01%	84	2.86%
2014	926	68.24%	393	28.96%	38	2.80%
2013	766	72.61%	280	26.54%	9	0.85%
2008	1,630	66.10%	795	32.24%	41	1.66%

== Education ==
The White Township School District serves public school students in pre-kindergarten through eighth grade at White Township Consolidated School. As of the 2021–22 school year, the district, comprised of one school, had an enrollment of 256 students and 32.1 classroom teachers (on an FTE basis), for a student–teacher ratio of 8.0:1.

Public school students in grades nine through twelve from Harmony Township, Hope Township and White Township attend Belvidere High School as part of sending/receiving relationships with the Belvidere School District. As of the 2021–22 school year, the high school had an enrollment of 357 students and 32.3 classroom teachers (on an FTE basis), for a student–teacher ratio of 11.1:1.

Students from the township and from all of Warren County are eligible to attend Ridge and Valley Charter School in Frelinghuysen Township (for grades K–8) or Warren County Technical School in Washington borough (for 9–12), with special education services provided by local districts supplemented throughout the county by the Warren County Special Services School District in Oxford Township (for Pre-K–12).

== Transportation ==
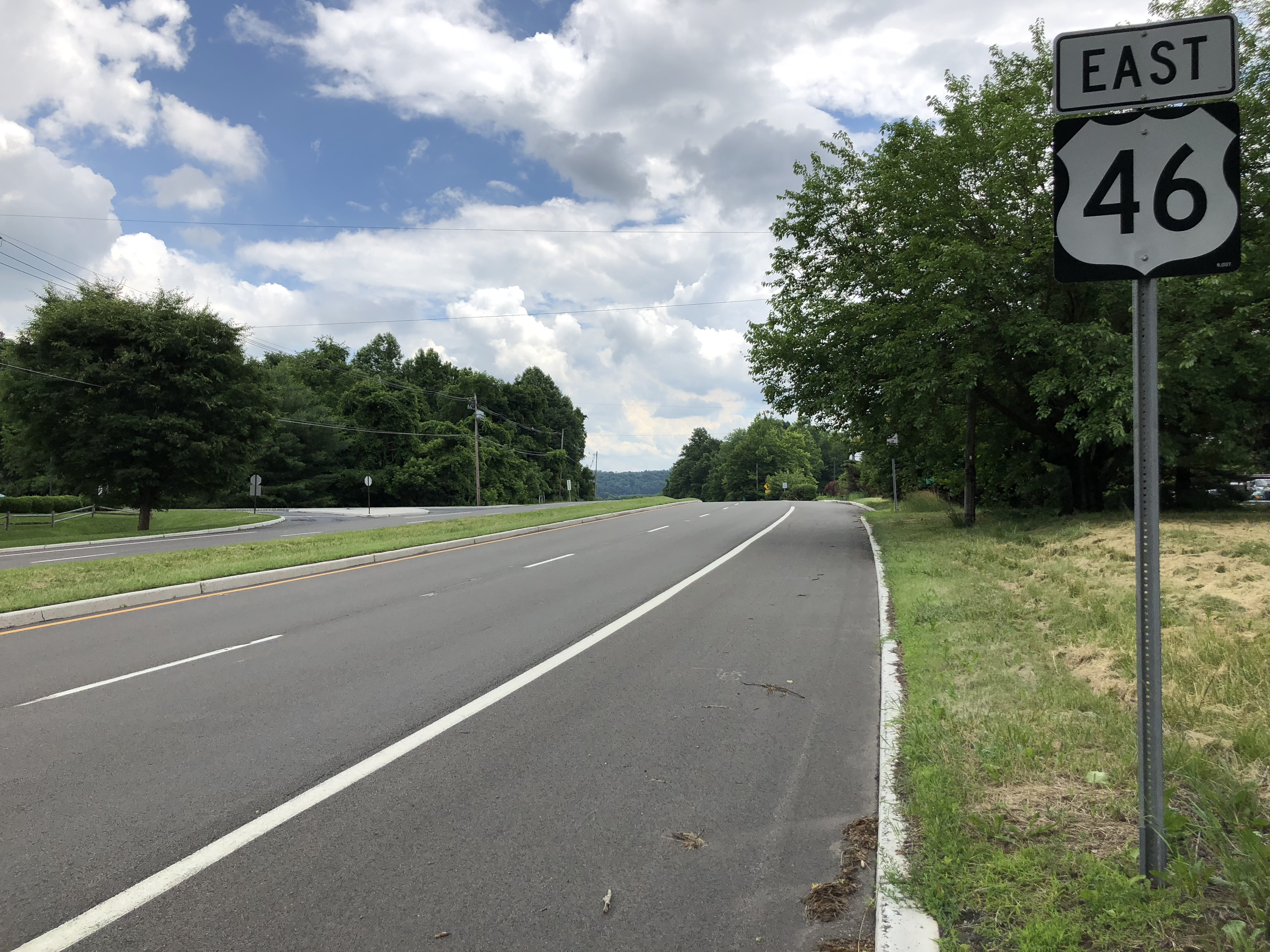
U.S. Route 46 eastbound in White Township, June 2018

As of May 2010, the township had a total of 66.08 miles (106.35 km) of roadways, of which 36.13 miles (58.15 km) were maintained by the municipality, 22.26 miles (35.82 km) by Warren County and 7.69 miles (12.38 km) by the New Jersey Department of Transportation.

U.S. Route 46 passes through the northern part of the township while Route 31 passes through briefly in the east before ending at Route 46. The major county road that passes through is CR 519.

Two limited access roads provide access to the municipality: Interstate 78/U.S. 22 in neighboring Franklin and Interstate 80 in neighboring Knowlton Township and Hope Township.

== Landmarks and places of interest ==
Regular meetings of the Warren County Board of County Commissioners are held at the Wayne Dumont Jr. Administrative Building in White Township, which also houses most of the administrative offices of Warren County.

Part of the Pequest Fish Hatchery also lies within the boundaries of White Township.

Four Sisters Winery is located in White Township.

== Notable people ==
People who were born in, residents of, or otherwise closely associated with White Township include:

- John Insley Blair (1802–1899), entrepreneur, railroad magnate, philanthropist and one of the 19th century's wealthiest men
- Charles W. Buttz (1837–1913), member of the United States House of Representatives from South Carolina
