= John Insley Blair =

American businessman (1802–1889)

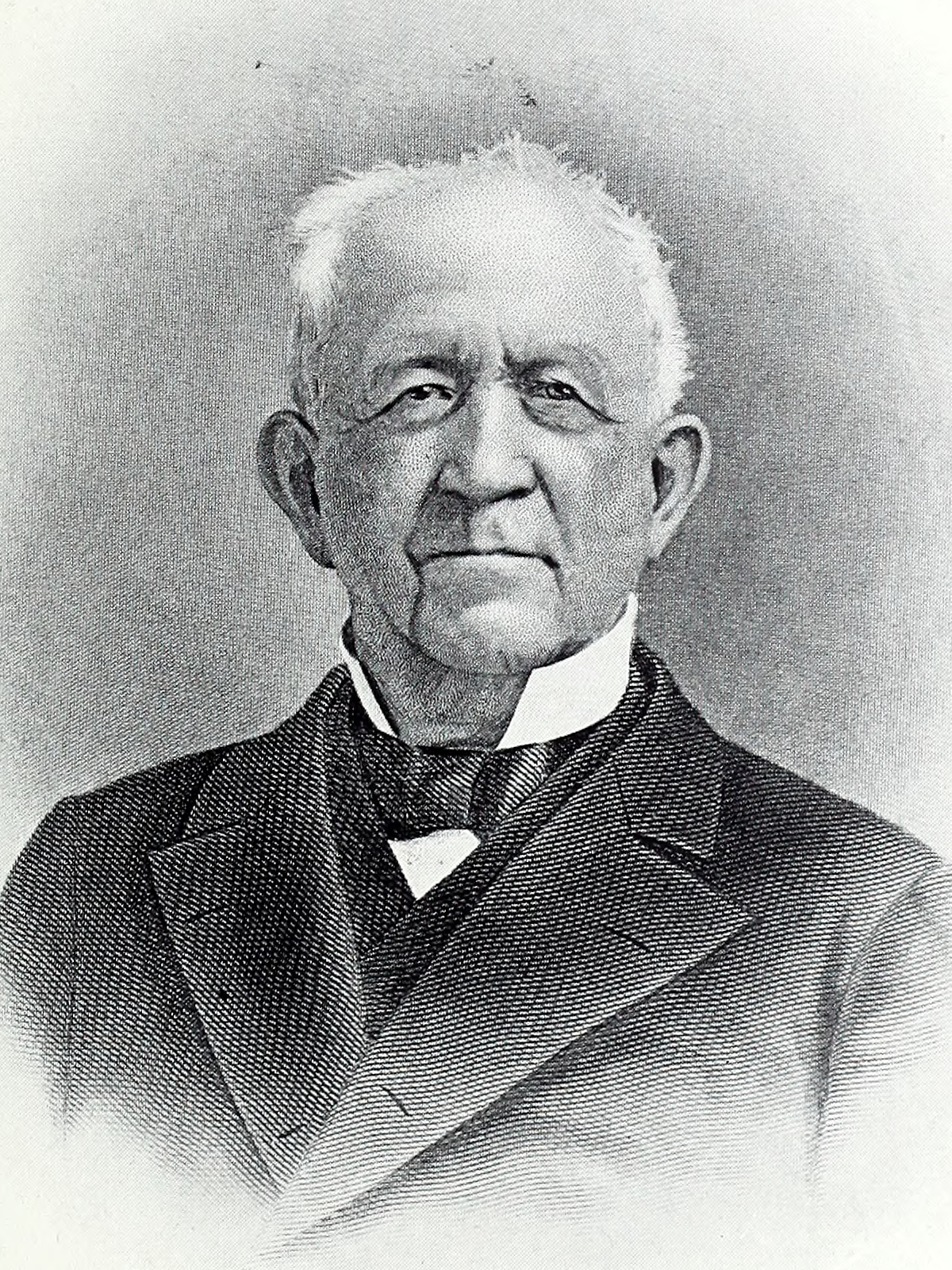
- Born: August 22, 1802; Foul Rift, New Jersey, U.S.
- Died: December 2, 1899 (aged 97); Blairstown, New Jersey, U.S.
- Spouse: Nancy Ann Locke (m. 1826; died 1888)
- Children: Emma Elizabeth Blair; Marcus Laurence Blair; DeWitt Clinton Blair; Aurelia Ann Blair
- Parent(s): James Blair (1769–1816); Rachel Insley (1777–1857)
- Relatives: Charles Scribner (son-in-law); C. Ledyard Blair (grandson)

Signature
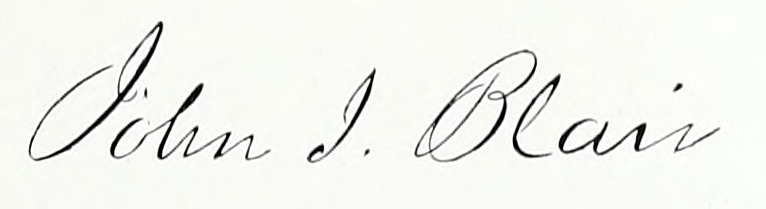

John Insley Blair (August 22, 1802 – December 2, 1899) was an American entrepreneur, railroad magnate, philanthropist, and one of the 19th century's wealthiest men.

== Early life ==
Blair was born at Foul Rift in White Township, New Jersey, just south of Belvidere, the fourth of ten children of James Blair and Rachel Insley. At the age of two, his family moved to a farm near Hope Township, New Jersey.

As a youth, Blair displayed a keen interest in the acquisition of wealth. At the age of ten, he is reported to have told his mother, "I have seven brothers and three sisters. That's enough in the family to be educated. I am going to get rich." The young Blair began earning money by trapping wild rabbits and muskrats and selling their skins at a price of sixteen for a dollar. The next year, Blair began working at a general store owned by his cousin John, and at the age of seventeen he founded a store of his own with his cousin as an equal partner, located in Butt's Bridge, New Jersey.

== Career ==
On August 25, 1825, the name of the community was changed to Gravel Hill and Blair was appointed postmaster, a position he retained until July, 1851. Blair bought out his cousin's share of their store and expanded operations. By 1830, he owned five stores, each one run by one of his brothers.

On January 23, 1839, Gravel Hill was officially renamed Blairstown, New Jersey (2000 Population of 5,747) in Blair's honor. Blair, either outright or jointly with others, owned Lackawanna Coal and Iron Company (1846), Delaware, Lackawanna and Western Railroad (1852), Union Pacific Railroad (1860), and was president, director, or joint in more than 20 others. He established Blair, Nebraska by purchasing a 1,075-acre (4.35 km^{2}) tract of land in Nebraska on May 10, 1869 after the Sioux City and Pacific Rail Road chose to cross the Missouri river at that location.

Blair managed his multimillion-dollar businesses from rural Blairstown, New Jersey, or from his private rail car, in which it was common for him to log 40,000 miles (64,000 km) annually. As president of 16 railroad companies, he amassed a fortune estimated at $70 million. Blair owned the most rail mileage in the world. His Presbyterian religion and penchant for philanthropy led him to found more than 100 churches in close proximity to his railroads. In 1873, he was also an investor in the Green Bay and Minnesota Railroad, and namesake Blair, Wisconsin.

== Personal life ==
On September 20, 1826, Blair married Nancy Ann Locke; they were the parents of four children:

- Emma Elizabeth Blair (1827–1869), who married prominent publisher Charles Scribner I (1821–1871).
- Marcus Laurence Blair (1830–1874), who died unmarried.
- DeWitt Clinton Blair (1833–1915), who continued businesses and expanded his father's philanthropy and had as his son, C. Ledyard Blair.
- Aurelia Ann Blair (1838–1865), who married Clarence Green Mitchell (1825-1893) in 1864.

He died in Blairstown, New Jersey on December 2, 1899.

=== Philanthropy, honors and legacy ===
His great-grandson, Episcopal bishop John Insley Blair Larned, was named after him.

He founded Blair Academy in 1848, and helped to found Lafayette College (in Easton, Pennsylvania) and Grinnell College (in Grinnell, Iowa).

At Princeton University, in Princeton, New Jersey, he endowed a geology professorship, first held by Arnold Henry Guyot. The endowed chair is the second oldest at the school; as of the start of the 2000–01 school year there were 172 such endowed chairs. He also served as trustee from 1866 until his death. In remarks at his installation as trustee, Blair noted that he had received little formal education and had spent most of his life as a businessman learning addition but that now "I have come to Princeton to learn subtraction." Blair provided funds to build Blair Hall, which was constructed in 1897 by Cope & Stewardson.

Party political offices
| Preceded by Marcus Lawrence Ward | Republican Nominee for Governor of New Jersey; 1868 | Succeeded by Cornelius Walsh |
