= Mount No More =

Mountain in New Jersey, USA

- Location within New Jersey

Highest point
- Elevation: 1,150 ft (350 m) NGVD 29
- Coordinates: 40°48′02″N 75°01′35″W

Geography
- Location: Warren County, New Jersey, U.S.
- Topo map: USGS Belvidere

Climbing
- Easiest route: Hiking

Mount No More is a mountain in the New York–New Jersey Highlands of the Appalachian Mountains in Warren County, New Jersey. The summit rises to 1,150 feet (351 m), and is located in White Township.
