= Brookfield, New Jersey =

Populated place in Warren County, New Jersey, US

- Census-designated place
- Location in Warren County Location in New Jersey Location in the United States
- Coordinates: 40.817384°N 75.060848°W
- Country: United States
- State: New Jersey
- County: Warren
- Township: White

Area
  - Total: 0.83 sq mi (2.16 km^{2})
  - Land: 0.83 sq mi (2.16 km^{2})
  - Water: 0 sq mi (0.00 km^{2}) 0.35%
- Elevation: 331 ft (101 m)

Population (2020)
  - Total: 727
  - Density: 872.7/sq mi (336.95/km^{2})
- Time zone: UTC−05:00 (Eastern (EST))
  - Summer (DST): UTC−04:00 (EDT)
- Area code: 908
- FIPS code: 34-08140
- GNIS feature ID: 02583976

Brookfield is an unincorporated community and census-designated place (CDP) located within White Township, in Warren County, in the U.S. state of New Jersey. As of the 2020 census, Brookfield had a population of 727.

== Geography ==
According to the United States Census Bureau, Brookfield had a total area of 0.212 square miles (0.548 km^{2}), including 0.211 square miles (0.546 km^{2}) of land and 0.001 square miles (0.002 km^{2}) of water (0.35%).

== Demographics ==
Historical population
Census	Pop.	Note	%±
2010	675		—
2020	727		7.7%
U.S. Decennial Census; 2010 2020

Brookfield first appeared as a census designated place in the 2010 U.S. census.

=== 2020 census ===
Brookfield CDP, New Jersey – Racial and ethnic composition Note: the US Census treats Hispanic/Latino as an ethnic category. This table excludes Latinos from the racial categories and assigns them to a separate category. Hispanics/Latinos may be of any race.
Race / Ethnicity (NH = Non-Hispanic)	Pop 2010	Pop 2020	% 2010	% 2020
White alone (NH)	654	704	96.89%	96.84%
Black or African American alone (NH)	5	2	0.74%	0.28%
Native American or Alaska Native alone (NH)	0	0	0.00%	0.00%
Asian alone (NH)	2	8	0.30%	1.10%
Native Hawaiian or Pacific Islander alone (NH)	1	0	0.15%	0.00%
Other race alone (NH)	3	1	0.44%	0.14%
Mixed race or Multiracial (NH)	2	1	0.30%	0.14%
Hispanic or Latino (any race)	8	11	1.19%	1.51%
Total	675	727	100.00%	100.00%

=== 2010 census ===
The 2010 United States census counted 675 people, 448 households, and 212 families in the CDP. The population density was 3,202.6 per square mile (1,236.5/km^{2}). There were 502 housing units at an average density of 2,381.8 per square mile (919.6/km^{2}). The racial makeup was 98.07% (662) White, 0.74% (5) Black or African American, 0.00% (0) Native American, 0.30% (2) Asian, 0.15% (1) Pacific Islander, 0.44% (3) from other races, and 0.30% (2) from two or more races. Hispanic or Latino of any race were 1.19% (8) of the population.

Of the 448 households, 0.0% had children under the age of 18; 45.3% were married couples living together; 1.3% had a female householder with no husband present and 52.7% were non-families. Of all households, 51.1% were made up of individuals and 49.3% had someone living alone who was 65 years of age or older. The average household size was 1.51 and the average family size was 2.04.

0.0% of the population were under the age of 18, 0.1% from 18 to 24, 0.7% from 25 to 44, 7.0% from 45 to 64, and 92.1% who were 65 years of age or older. The median age was 75.9 years. For every 100 females, the population had 60.7 males. For every 100 females ages 18 and older there were 60.7 males.
