= C. Ledyard Blair House =

Demolished mansion in Manhattan, New York

Coordinates: 40°46′15.2″N 73°58′3.6″W

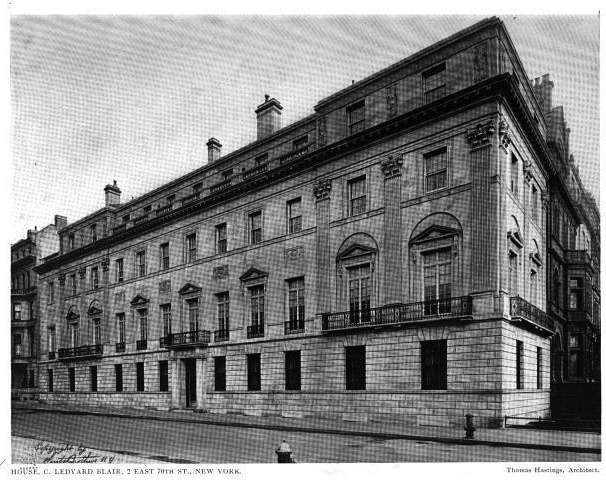
- C. Ledyard Blair House, from Architecture magazine, 1917
- Interactive map of the C. Ledyard Blair House area

General information
- Architectural style: Beaux-Arts
- Location: Manhattan, New York City
- Construction started: 1914
- Completed: 1917
- Demolished: 1927

Design and construction
- Architect: Carrère & Hastings

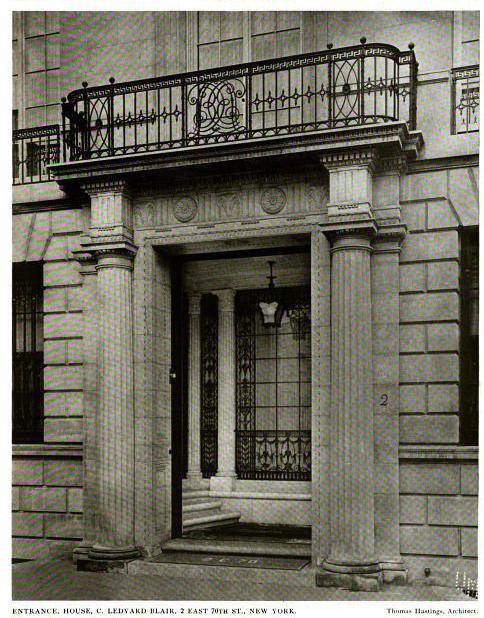
House entrance

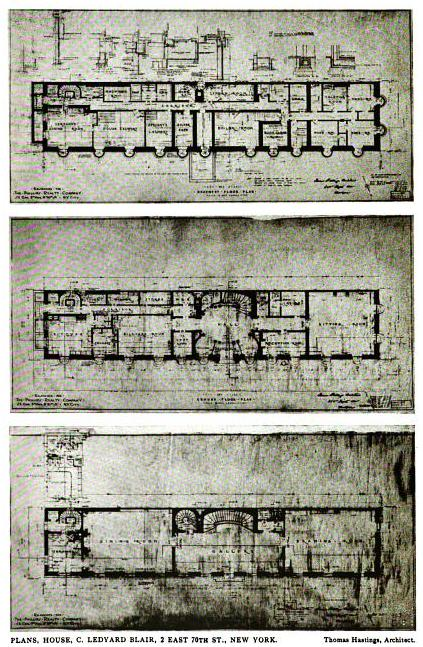
House plan

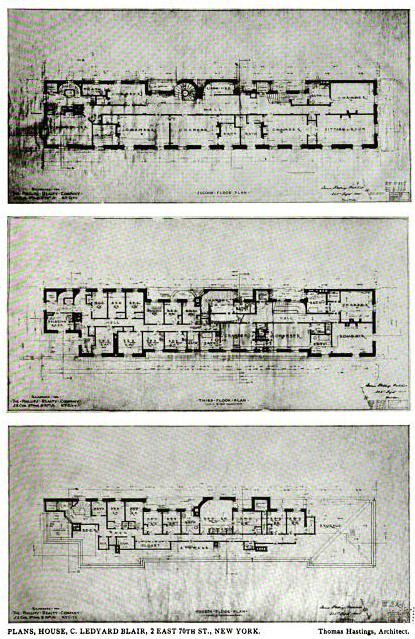
House plan 2nd floor

The C. Ledyard Blair House was a mansion on 2 East 70th Street, at the corner with Fifth Avenue, on the Upper East Side of Manhattan in New York City. It was constructed for banker C. Ledyard Blair and designed by Carrère & Hastings. The house was constructed from 1914 to 1917 and contained almost 7,300 square feet (680 m^{2}). It was sold and demolished in 1927 to make way for an apartment house.

== Architecture ==
The Beaux-Arts mansion, designed by Carrère & Hastings, was at 2 East 70th Street, at the southeastern corner with Fifth Avenue. The house overlooked the gardens of the Henry Clay Frick House at 1 East 70th Street, which had also been designed by Carrère & Hastings. It was built by Norcross Brothers at a projected cost of between $150,000 and $200,000. The Lord Electric Company received the electric contract, Norcross Brothers furnished most of the rooms, and C. Brainard was consulting engineer.

The 66-room mansion contained nearly 7,300 square feet (680 m^{2}) and measured 33 by 158 feet (10 by 48 m). The facade was made of limestone. The second-story windows had iron balconies. When the house was completed, it had a grass planting strip on Fifth Avenue, with two plane trees. The New York Times described it in 1915 as "an excellent example of good architectural taste combined with the luxuries and comforts of a Fifth Avenue home."

== History ==
The stretch of 70th Street between Fifth Avenue and Third Avenue, part of Lenox Hill, was relatively undeveloped until World War I. Henry Clay Frick's mansion at the northeast corner of 70th Street and Fifth Avenue spurred the development of similarly grand mansions on 70th Street. Before the Blair House was constructed, the site contained the Josiah M. Fiske mansion, which occupied a site measuring 33.5 by 175 feet (10.2 m × 53.3 m).

An anonymous buyer acquired the Fiske mansion from Fiske's widow in May 1912 for $750,000. In September 1914, the buyer was reported as C. Ledyard Blair, a banker and Governor of the New York Stock Exchange. The design and general contracts were awarded in February 1915. The house was completed in 1917. During the mansion's short existence, the Blairs hosted a luncheon in 1919 to celebrate the marriage of C. Ledyard Blair's daughter, as well as another social event in 1920.

By 1925, Blair was meeting with real estate developer Anthony Campagna to sell his mansion. At the time, Fifth Avenue was quickly being developed with apartments. In January 1926, after just nine years, Blair sold the property to Campagna for $1.25 million. The sale, at $170 per square foot ($1,800/m^{2}), was reported in The New York Times as the "highest ever paid per square foot for property to be used for this class of building". He tore down the house in late 1926 and early 1927, redeveloping the site with a new 11-story apartment building designed by Rosario Candela. The new apartment was completed in 1928. The building featured a maisonette with its own private entrance and address, 888 Fifth Avenue, later owned by Theodore J. Forstmann.
