= Alan D'Andrea =

American cancer researcher (born 1956)

- Born: September 28, 1956 (age 69); Pasadena, California, U.S.
- Education: Harvard University, Harvard Medical School
- Awards: Member, National Academy of Medicine, 2017; Fellow, American Association for the Advancement of Science (AAAS), 2012; 52nd Annual AACR G.H.A. Clowes Memorial Award, 2012.
- Scientific career
- Fields: Cancer research, oncology, hematology
- Workplaces: Harvard Medical School, Dana Farber Cancer Institute

Alan D. D'Andrea is an American cancer researcher and the Fuller American Cancer Society Professor of Radiation Oncology at Harvard Medical School. D'Andrea's research at the Dana Farber Cancer Institute focuses on chromosome instability and cancer susceptibility. He is currently the director of the Center for DNA Damage and Repair and the director of the Susan F. Smith Center for Women's Cancer.

As a postdoctoral fellow at the Whitehead Institute of Biomedical Research in Cambridge, Massachusetts, D'Andrea cloned the erythropoietin receptor, a protein known to rescue red blood cell progenitors from apoptosis.

== Research ==
The D’Andrea laboratory at the Dana Farber Cancer Institute focuses on the molecular events involved in normal blood cell formation and on the molecular cause of leukemia and other cancers. His laboratory examines molecular signaling pathways and the resulting DNA damage response in mammalian cells. These pathways are often disrupted in cancer cells, accounting for chromosome instability and increased gene mutation frequency in human tumors. D'Andrea and his colleagues have identified and cloned a family of cytokine-inducible deubiquitinating enzymes that regulate hematopoietic cell growth by controlling the ubiquitin-mediated proteolysis of intracellular growth regulatory proteins.

The practical application of D'Andrea's research includes genetic diseases in humans. His primary focus is the molecular pathogenesis of human chromosome instability syndromes: Fanconi anemia (FA), ataxia-telangiectasia (AT), and Bloom syndrome (BS). Most notably, Fanconi anemia is an autosomal-recessive cancer susceptibility disorder characterized by developmental defects and increased cellular sensitivity to DNA crosslinking agents.

D'Andrea's laboratory contributed significantly to the elucidation of a new DNA repair pathway, the FA/BRCA pathway, and demonstrated that one of the FA genes (FANCD1) is identical to the breast cancer gene, BRCA2. Somatic disruption of genes in the FA/BRCA pathway account for the chromosome instability and drug sensitivity of many solid tumors in the general population including breast, ovarian, prostate, and pancreatic cancers.

== Background ==
D’Andrea received his MD in 1983 from Harvard Medical School, residency training in pediatric at Children's Hospital of Philadelphia, and fellowship training in hematology–oncology at the Dana Farber Cancer Institute and Children’s Hospital Boston. He completed a research fellowship at the Whitehead Institute of Biomedical Research and joined the Dana Farber Cancer Institute in 1990.

== Awards ==
- Member, National Academy of Sciences, 2021.
- Lifetime Achievement Award, Fanconi Anemia Research Fund, 2019.
- Ernest Beutler Lecture and Prize, American Society of Hematology, 2018.
- Member, National Academy of Medicine, 2017.
- Co-leader, Stand Up To Cancer Dream Team for Ovarian Cancer, 2015.
- 52nd Annual AACR G.H.A. Clowes Memorial Award, 2012.
- Fellow, American Association for the Advancement of Science (AAAS), 2012.
- Brian P. O'Dell Memorial Research Award, LLS, 2009.
- Elected Member, American Association of Physicians, 2003.
- E. Mead Johnson Award for Research in Pediatrics, Society for Pediatric Research, 2001.
- Excellence in Research Award, American Academy of Pediatrics, 1997.
- Scholar Award, Leukemia Society of America, 1995.
- Markey Scholar Award, 1990.

== Personal ==
D'Andrea attended the Lawrenceville School in Lawrenceville, New Jersey and Harvard University. He lives in Gloucester, Massachusetts with his wife and dog. He has two children. He is the brother of Laura Tyson, an American economist and former Chair of the US President's Council of Economic Advisers during the Clinton Administration.
