= Roy Geronemus =

American dermatologist

Roy G. Geronemus (born March 5, 1953) is an American dermatologist in the field of laser treatment of skin disorders.

== Career ==
Geronemus is the director of the Laser & Skin Surgery Center of New York. He is also Clinical Professor of Dermatology at the New York University Medical Center.

Geronemus has contributed to the clinical development of laser and technology systems for devices for the treatment of skin problems including the pulsed dye laser and the Picosecond laser.

Geronemus' publications have covered treatments for port wine stains, hemangiomas, sun damaged skin, wrinkles, telangiectases, birthmarks, skin laxity, hair removal, tattoo removal and Nevus of Ota removal. Geronemus has advocated the early intervention of vascular birthmarks, encouraging treatment during early infancy.

== Awards and service ==
Geronemus is a past President of the American Society for Dermatologic Surgery and the American Society for Laser Medicine and Surgery.

Geronemus received the 2001 Ellet Drake Memorial Award from the American Society for Laser Medicine and Surgery.

He received the 2013 Samuel J. Stegman Award for Distinguished Service by the American Society for Dermatologic Surgery.
