= Jason Hitz =

Zimbabwean cricketer (born 1980)

Personal information
- Full name: Jason Henry Hitz
- Born: 20 February 1980 (age 46); Bulawayo, Zimbabwe
- Batting: Right-handed
- Bowling: Right-arm fast-medium

Domestic team information
- Years: Team
- 1999/00: Matabeleland

Career statistics
Competition	First-class
Matches	3
Runs scored	28
Batting average	5.60
100s/50s	–/–
Top score	24
Balls bowled	162
Wickets	4
Bowling average	29.75
5 wickets in innings	–
10 wickets in match	–
Best bowling	2/25
Catches/stumpings	3/–
- Source: Cricinfo, 20 October 2012

Jason Henry Hitz (born 20 February 1980) is a former Zimbabwean cricketer. He was a right-handed batsman and a right-arm medium-fast bowler who played for Matabeleland. He was born in Bulawayo.

Hitz made three appearances during the Logan Cup competition of 1999/2000, debuting against Manicaland. Batting as a tailender, 24 of Hitz's 28 career runs came in the same innings, against Mashonaland.

Hitz took four wickets in 27 overs of bowling.

Hitz later played rugby union in the United Kingdom, at Aldeburgh & Thorpeness Rugby Club, in Aldeburgh, Suffolk, making eight appearances in the 2013/14 season.
