= Hitz Radio =

Defunct UK internet radio station

Logo for Hitz Radio Unsigned, one of the Hitz Radio stations

Hitz Radio is a defunct internet radio station. It was founded in 2006 by Ryan Dunlop in Ayrshire, Scotland. Hitz Radio is owned and operated by Hitz Media Group Ltd.

Dunlop claimed his drivetime slot averaged 80,000 listeners, and that he employs 40 staff. These claims were disputed by various experts in the radio industry during 2007. As of November 2007, Hitz Radio was investigated by Trading Standards over these claims, and questioned about operating without the licenses which radio stations require.

A video broadcast service, Hitz Television, made its debut in July 2007, using YouTube to broadcast

According to Radio Today, Hitz Radio came under fire from some in the UK radio industry.

== Origins ==
Hitz Radio launched on 16 January 2006 when Dunlop was age 14, but the station was operating as a hobby since December 2004 or earlier.

Hitz Radio filed as a private limited company at Companies House on 2 October 2006, which is wholly owned by Ryan Dunlop.

Hitz Radio launched its services from Dunlop's bedroom PC, before moving into the "infamous" shed, where it was reported in press and media during February and March 2007.

== Audience ==
In common with most online radio stations, there were no independently verified figures on the audience of Hitz Radio.

In March 2007, Hitz Radio claimed 250,000 listeners, with the peak slot averaging 80,000 listeners. In May 2007, Dunlop claimed Hitz Radio had "around five million people from all over the world visiting at any one time."

=== Awards ===
Hitz Radio received an industry award in 2007, and was a regional winner for a second. The Daily Record awarded its 2007 Our Heroes Business Award to Ryan Dunlop and Hitz Radio, described in the award-winners list as having "5 million fans." Ryan Dunlop and Hitz Radio were also the regional winner for south west Scotland in the Shell Livewire 2007 Scottish Young Entrepreneur Awards.

== Investigation by Trading Standards ==
In November 2007, Hitz Radio was investigated by Trading Standards, after they received complaints about the claims made about the companies operations.

Trading Standards also found that despite Dunlop's claims, Hitz Radio was in fact operating without licenses from the Phonographic Performance Limited or Mechanical Copyright Protection Society, which are required to operate a radio station.

== "The Final Countdown" ==
Hitz Radio ended online broadcasting on 2 June 2008 with a 2-hour show presented live by Dunlop entitled "The Final Countdown." It took the form of a music request show interspersed with highlights from HitzRadio's time on air. During it he courted controversy by calling people in the radio industry "tits"; and making claims that the station could possibly be moving to New York. He continually called Hitz Radio "the world's biggest / greatest radio station" during the broadcast.

Hitz Radio re-launched an online broadcast on 14 September 2008 in the form of its new music radio station Hitz Radio Xtra, again with no evidence of royalty fee being paid.

== Proposal to strike off ==
The "parent company" of Hitz Radio UK, which also claimed to operate a record label and a television production company amongst others, which is solely run by Ryan Dunlop has been proposed to be struck off the companies register after the non-filing of returns or accounts. The same situation is also in place for Hitz Radio Ltd, which is also under proposal to strike off for the same reasons. They have since been dissolved.
