= Blairsden (house) =

Mansion in Peapack-Gladstone, New Jersey

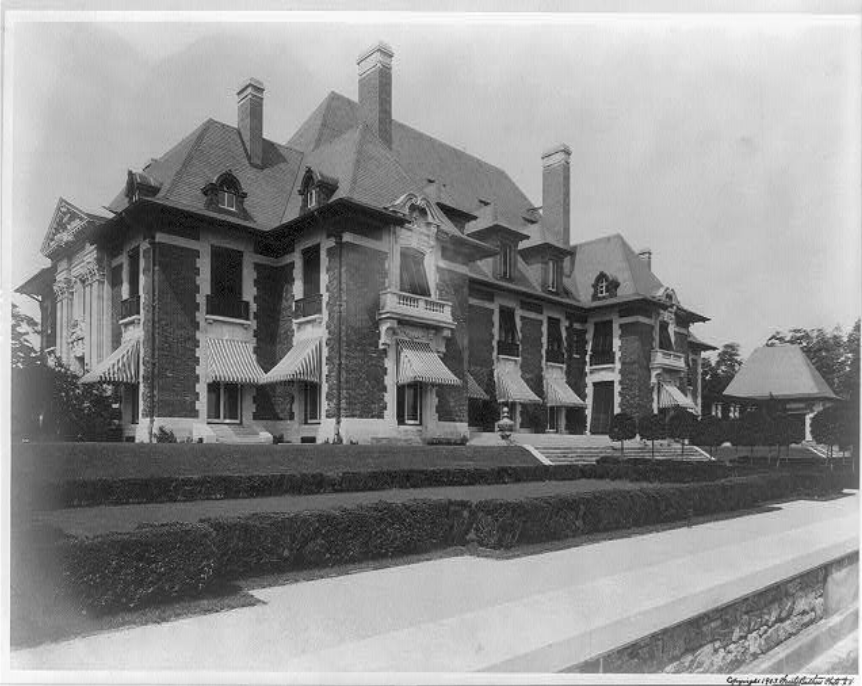
- View of front of house, ca. 1903
- Interactive map of the Blairsden area

General information
- Architectural style: Beaux-Arts
- Location: 30 Blair Drive, Peapack-Gladstone, New Jersey
- Coordinates: 40°42′51.29″N 74°38′12.26″W
- Construction started: 1897
- Completed: 1903
- Client: Clinton Ledyard Blair
- Owner: 30 Blair PG, LLC (Anthony M. Melillo)

Technical details
- Floor area: 2,077 square feet (193.0 m^{2})

Design and construction
- Architect: Carrère and Hastings

Other information
- Number of rooms: 38

Blairsden is a historic 62,000-square-foot (5,800 m^{2}), 38-room mansion located in Peapack-Gladstone, New Jersey. Set high on a hilltop overlooking Ravine Lake, the mansion is part of what was originally an estate of 550 acres (2,200,000 m^{2}). In addition to its 38 rooms, the mansion has 25 fireplaces and 19 bathrooms.

== History ==
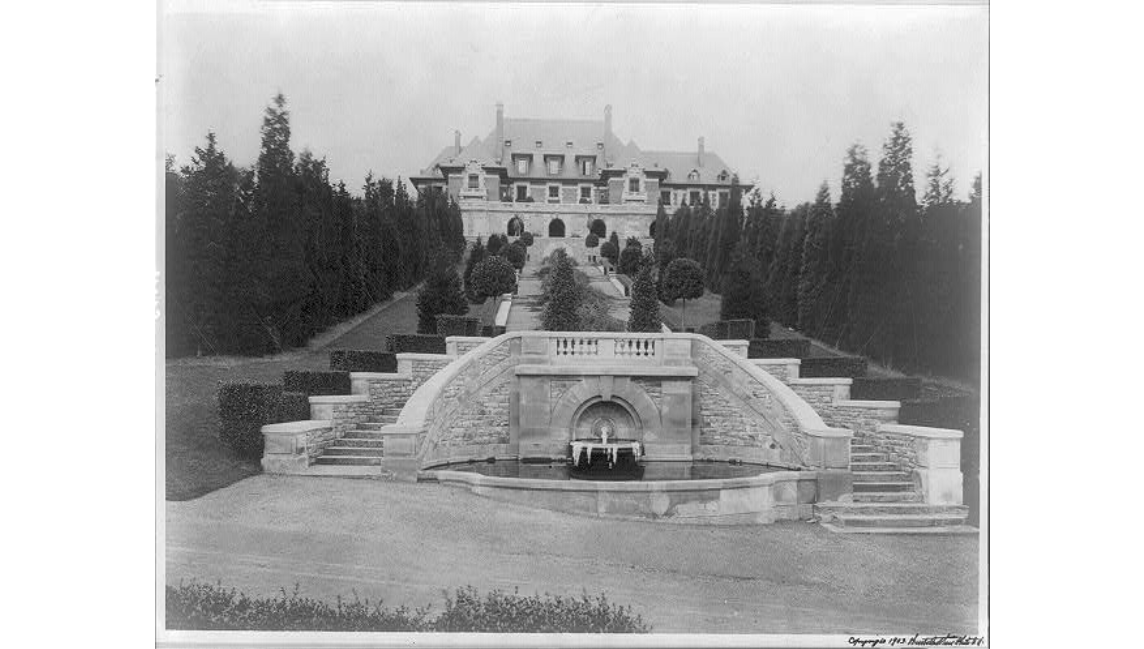
View of house past terrace gardens, ca. 1903

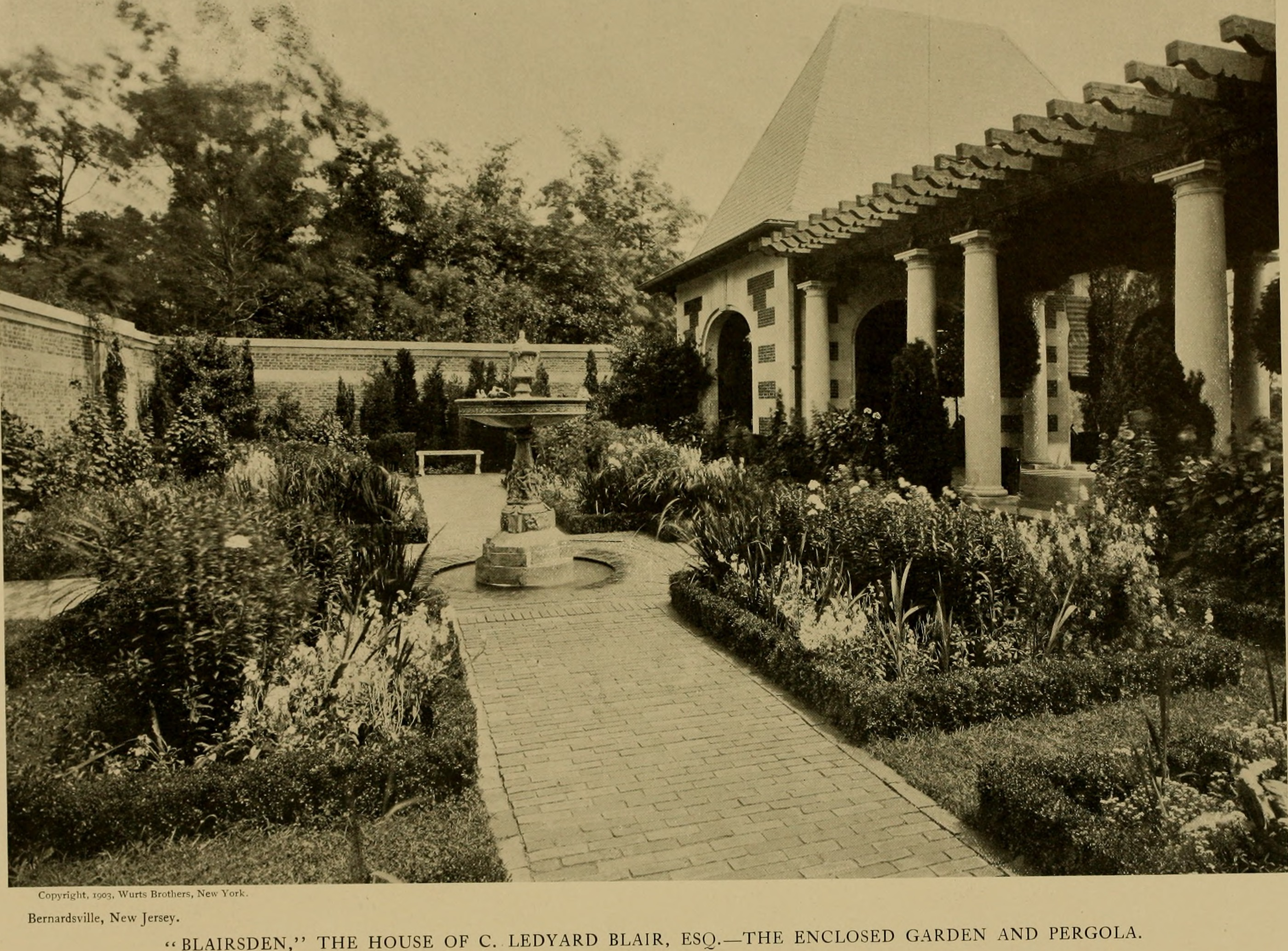
The home's enclosed garden in 1903

Blairsden was built between 1897 and 1903 for Clinton Ledyard Blair (1867–1949), an American investment banker. It was designed by the prominent architectural firm of Carrère and Hastings. Blair spared no expense in building Blairsden, including leveling off the mountain, building a funicular to shuttle building materials and later guests up and down the terraced mountain and purchasing trees and shrubs aged 25–50 years old, as he did not wish "to wait for things to grow." Blairsden also included a 300-ft reflecting pool decorated with a surround of busts of the Roman Emperors. The household employed a staff of over 70 to support the household and grounds.

=== Sisters of St. John the Baptist ===
After Blair's death in 1949, the mansion was sold for $68,000 ($920,140 in 2025) to the Sisters of St. John the Baptist, who operated the house as a religious retreat. In 2002, the Sisters of St. John the Baptist sold the property to the Foundation for Classical Architecture, owned by Victor Shafferman.

=== Present day ===
The mansion was subsequently listed for sale and sold in 2012 for $4.5 million to a holding company named Blairsden Hall, LLC. Local officials identified the new owner as T. Eric Galloway, a New York developer and president of the Galvan Foundation and the Lantern Organization.

In May 2014, Blairsden was the site of the 2014 "Mansion in May" charity fundraiser designer show house and Gardens. This designer show house was presented by the Women's Association of Morristown Medical Center, and it attracted over 33,000 visitors.

The mansion was last sold in 2022 to 30 Blair PG, LLC, a subsidiary of Gladstone-based real estate private equity firm Melillo Equities.

== See also ==
- Beaux-Arts architecture
