= Alex Hitz =

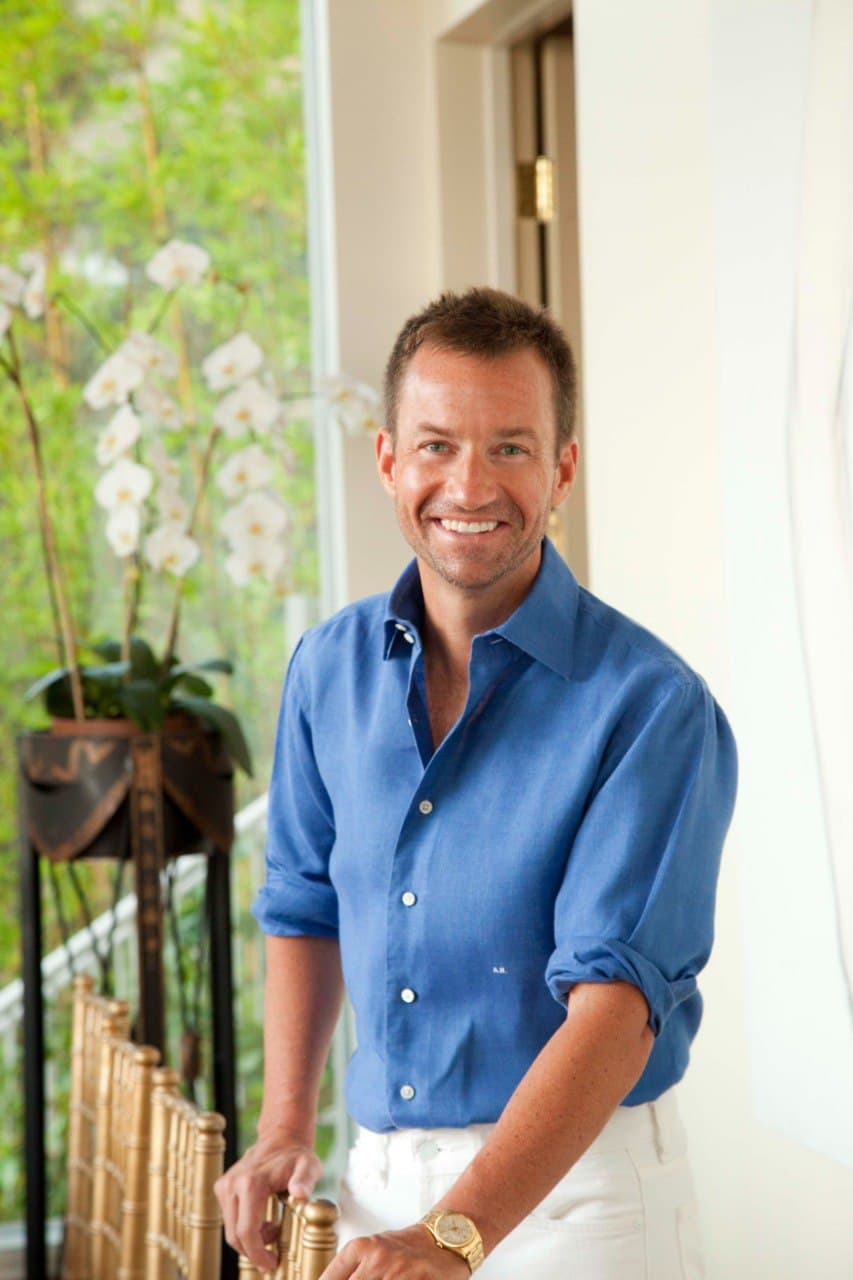
Alex Hitz

Alex Hitz (born February 10, 1969) is an American celebrity chef, author of two cookbooks, philanthropist, socialite, columnist. Founder of the food product line The Beverly Hills Kitchen. Former food editor of House Beautiful.

He was named “the very best host in the world” by The Wall Street Journal.

== Biography ==
Alex Hitz was born in Atlanta, Georgia, on February 10, 1969, to Caroline Bryans Sauls and Alex Hitz. His mother's family was one of the investors in The Coca-Cola Company, and Mrs. Hitz was a trustee of the Atlanta Memorial Arts Center (now called the Woodruff Arts Center) and the Atlanta Historical Society (now called the Atlanta History Center). His father's family is descended from Florian Hitz, the first Swiss ambassador to the United States. His parents divorced when Hitz was three years old, and in December 1973 his mother remarried Robert Shaw, a symphonic and choral conductor. Hitz spent his young years at the family home in France.

In 1987, after graduating from Avon Old Farms School, Hitz worked at the restaurant The Patio by The River in Atlanta, Georgia.

=== Education ===
Alex Hitz graduated with a bachelor's degree in English from Washington and Lee University in 1991. At the same time, he attended undergraduate programs at the University of London, where he studied English and Theatre, and at L’Université de Paris-La Sorbonne, where he studied French Culture and Civilization. He completed advanced programs at Peter Kump's Cooking School (now the Institute of Culinary Education) in New York City in 1995 and Le Cordon Bleu in Paris in 1996.

== Career ==
In 1991, Hitz became co-owner of The Patio by the River with Mary Boyle Hataway and sold it in 1994. In 1995, he moved to New York City and produced some Broadway shows (Triumph of Love (1997), the revival of The Sound of Music (1998) etc.) In 1998, Hitz started investing in real estate in the New York, Atlanta, and Los Angeles areas and designed bespoke clothing. Since 2009, Hitz is one of the three trustees of The Dennis Hopper Trust.

=== Food product line ===
In 2008 Hitz began developing The Beverly Hills Kitchen which was a line of gourmet frozen food products. The first food product, Beef Bourguignon, was presented on the QVC on October 1, 2009. In January 2011 Hitz moved his product line to the Home Shopping Network (HSN) television station.

=== Culinary manner ===
Hitz culinary art combines the Atlanta and French cuisines and cooking styles. He creates haute-cuisine restaurant-quality recipes for the home cook. His updated Southern dishes consist of the Low Country and the Creole cuisines. His teachers were Andre Soltner at Lutèce in New York, and Michel Guerard at Eugenie-Les-Bains in France.

== Books ==
Hitz is the author of the cookbook My Beverly Hills Kitchen: Classic Southern Cooking with a French Twist (Knopf, October 2012).

In October 2019, he published his second book The Art of The Host: Recipes and Rules for Flawless Entertaining (Rizzoli).

He was a food columnist of House Beautiful and he is a contributing editor of Town&Country Magazine.

== Recognitions ==
He is known as “The Ralph Lauren of food and wine”.
