= C. Ledyard Blair =

American investment banker and yachtsman

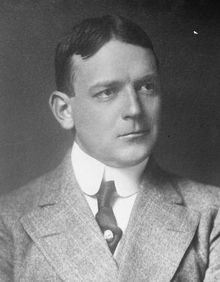
- Born: Clinton Ledyard Blair; July 16, 1867; Belvidere, New Jersey, U.S.
- Died: February 7, 1949 (aged 81); Manhattan, New York, U.S.
- Education: Lawrenceville School; Princeton University
- Occupation: Investment banker
- Spouses: Florence Osborne Jennings (m. 1891; died 1931) Harriet Stewart Brown (m. 1936–1949)
- Children: 4
- Parent(s): DeWitt Clinton Blair; Mary Anna Kimball
- Relatives: John Insley Blair (grandfather)

Clinton Ledyard Blair (July 16, 1867 – February 7, 1949) was an American investment banker and yachtsman.

== Early years ==
Blair was born in Belvidere, New Jersey, on July 16, 1867. He was the son of DeWitt Clinton Blair, a philanthropist and industrialist, and Mary Anna (née Kimball) Blair. His paternal grandfather was John Insley Blair, one of the wealthiest men of the 19th century.

He attended the Lawrenceville School and then Princeton University, graduating in 1890 with a Bachelor of Arts degree.

== Career ==
While still a senior at Princeton, Blair joined his father and grandfather in founding the banking firm of Blair & Company, primarily to manage railroad interests linked to the Gould family. The firm underwrote a $50 million bond issue of the Western Pacific Railroad and helped in the financial management of the Denver and Rio Grande Western Railroad and the Western Maryland Railroad.

After Blair & Company merged with the firm of William Salomon & Co. in April 1920 (under the name of Blair & Co., Inc.), Ledyard Blair was named chairman of the board of directors. He was also the director of several railway companies, including the Clinchfield Railroad, the Sussex Railroad, and the Green Bay and Western Railroad.

Blair & Co. was active in assisting with the mergers of oil companies. In 1924-1925, the firm arranged a deal in which Standard Oil of Indiana obtained control of the Pan American Petroleum and Transport Company and Lago Petroleum Company in Venezuela.

Blair facilitated the formation of the Tide Water Associated Oil Company in 1926.

== Society life ==
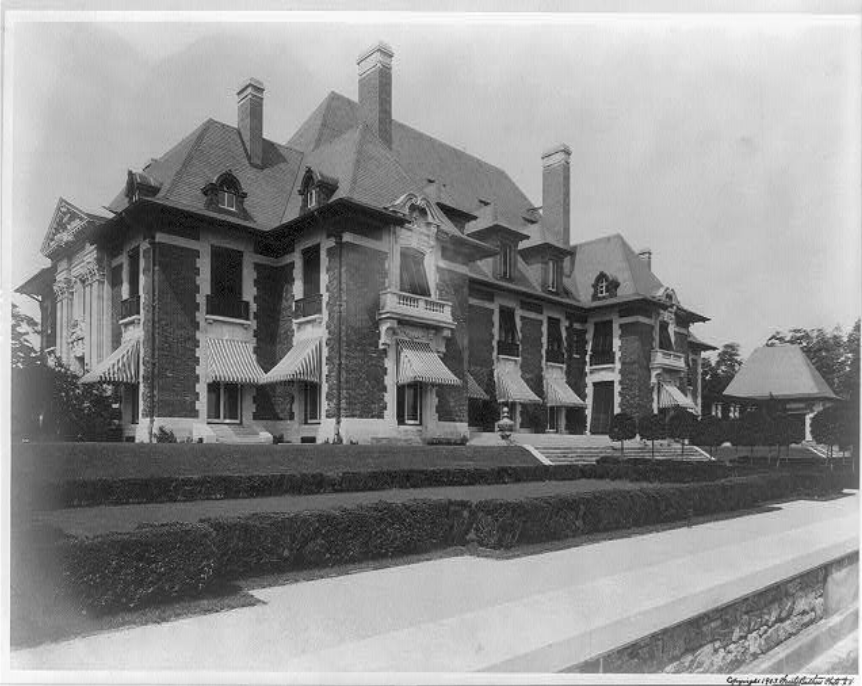
Blair's home, Blairsden

An avid yachtsman, Blair was named Commodore of the New York Yacht Club in 1910. During World War I, he turned over his 254-foot steel yacht, Diana, to the U.S. government and gave up yachting. At the outbreak of the war in 1914, Blair was on the SS Kronprinzessin Cecilie, a North German Lloyd ocean liner, sailing from New York City to Plymouth, England. Nearing Plymouth, news of hostilities forced the ship to turn back. Blair took the helm and safely piloted the ship to Bar Harbor, Maine, where his family had a summer home. The ship was carrying $10 million in gold and $3.5 million in silver.

Blairsden, Ledyard Blair's opulent 38-room mansion in Peapack-Gladstone, New Jersey, was built between 1898 and 1903. Blair threw lavish weddings for each of the Blair daughters, all held at Blairsden. He also owned a mansion in New York City, now known as C. Ledyard Blair House. In addition to Blairsden, he had residences in Newport, Rhode Island, "Honeysuckle Lodge," and Bermuda, "Deepdene."

== Personal life ==
On October 1, 1891, he married Florence Osborne Jennings (1869–1931) and they had four daughters:

- Marjory Bruce Blair (1892–1975), who married William Clark (1891–1957) in 1913.
- Florence Ledyard Blair (1893–1982), who married Herbert Rivington Pyne (1892–1952), son of Percy Rivington Pyne II, in 1917.
- Edith Dodd Blair (1896–1988), who married Richard Gambrill (1890–1952) in 1917.
- Marie Louise Blair (1899–1994), who married Maj. Gen. Pierpont Morgan Hamilton (1898–1982) in 1919. She later married Washington Everardus Bogardus (1896–1931) and James Bethune Campbell (1909–1983).

Blair's first wife Florence died on November 15, 1931. In 1936, he married Harriet Stewart Brown (1884–1953), the widow of Thomas Suffern Tailer (who died in 1928), and daughter of Baltimore banker Alexander Brown. The Browns were members of the family which founded investment bank Alex. Brown & Sons.

Blair died on February 7, 1949, in Manhattan and was buried in Saint Bernards Cemetery, beside his first wife Florence.
