= Joseph Kekuku =

Hawaiian-American musician (1870s–1932)

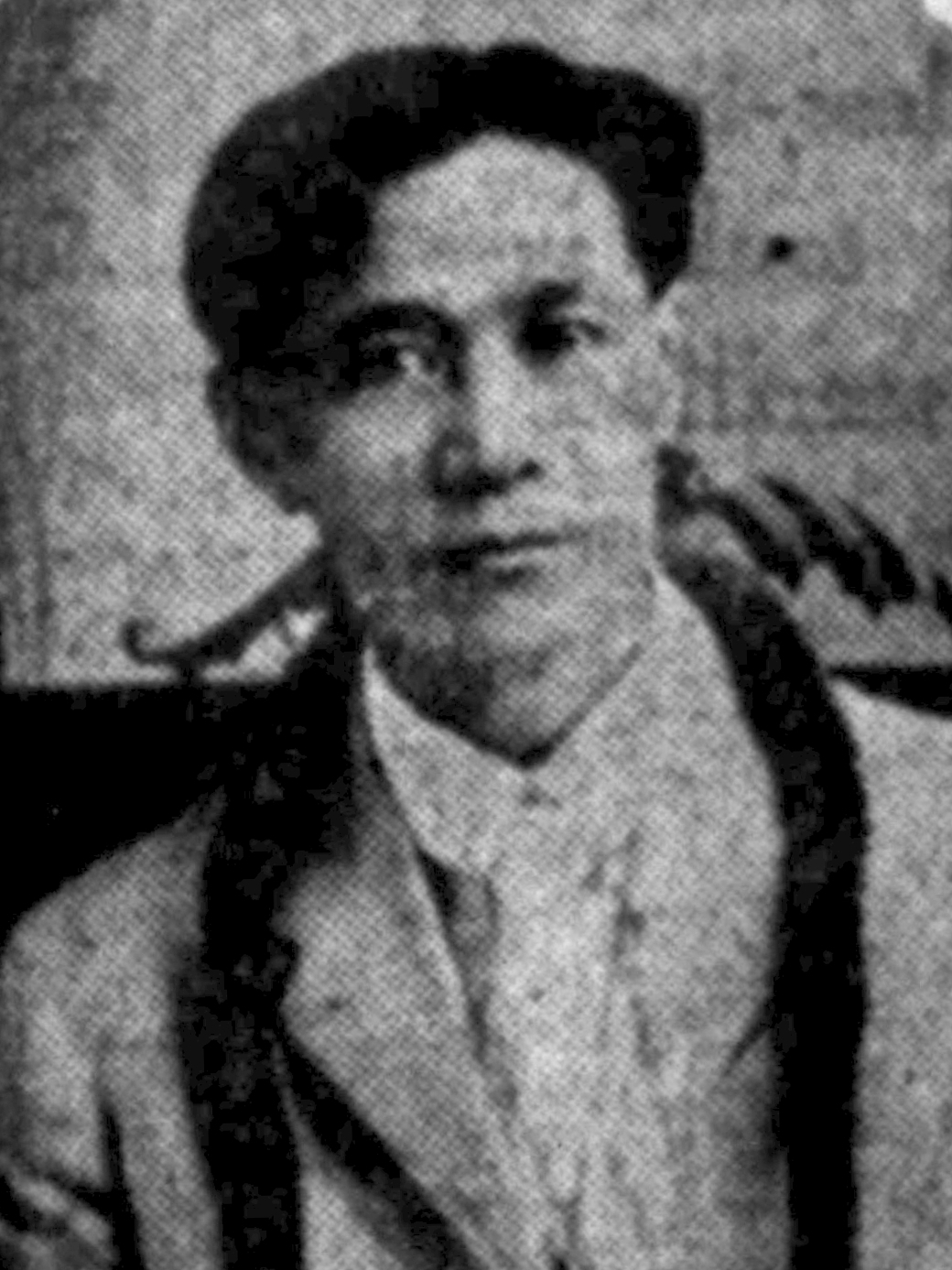
- Kekuku in a 1912 advertisement

Background information
- Born: Joseph Kekuku‘upenakana‘iapuniokamehameha Apuakehau, Jr. c. 1874 – c. 1875; Laie, Hawaiian Kingdom
- Died: January 16, 1932 Morristown, New Jersey, United States
- Genre: Hapa haole music
- Instrument: Steel guitar

Joseph Kekuku‘upenakana‘iapuniokamehameha Apuakehau Jr. (1874/75 – January 16, 1932), better known as Joseph Kekuku, was a Hawaiian-American musician and the inventor of the steel guitar. Born in the Hawaiian Kingdom, Kekuku immigrated to the contiguous United States in 1904 (following the US annexation of Hawaii) to pursue a successful career in music. In 1993, he was inducted into the Steel Guitar Hall of Fame.

== Biography ==
=== Early life ===
Joseph Kekuku‘upenakana‘iapuniokamehameha Apuakehau Jr. was born in Laie, a village on the North Shore of Oʻahu, Hawaii. Conflicting information surrounds his date of birth, either October 19 or December 19, 1874, or December 29, 1875. When Joseph was 15, his cousin, Sam Nainoa, and he left for a boarding school in Honolulu.

=== Discovery of the steel guitar ===
In 1889, while attending the Kamehameha School for Boys, Kekuku accidentally invented the steel guitar technique. In an article first seen in 1932, C.S. DeLano, publisher of the "Hawaiian Music in Los Angeles", whose "Hawaiian Love Song" was the first original composition to be written for the Hawaiian steel guitar, said:

'"Joseph told me that he was walking along a road in Honolulu 42 years ago, holding an old Spanish guitar, when he saw a rusty bolt on the ground. As he picked it up, the bolt accidentally vibrated one of the strings and produced a new tone that was rather pleasing. After practicing for a time with the metal bolt, Joe experimented with the back of a pocket knife, then with the back of a steel comb, and still later on with a highly polished steel [bar] very similar to the sort that is used today."'

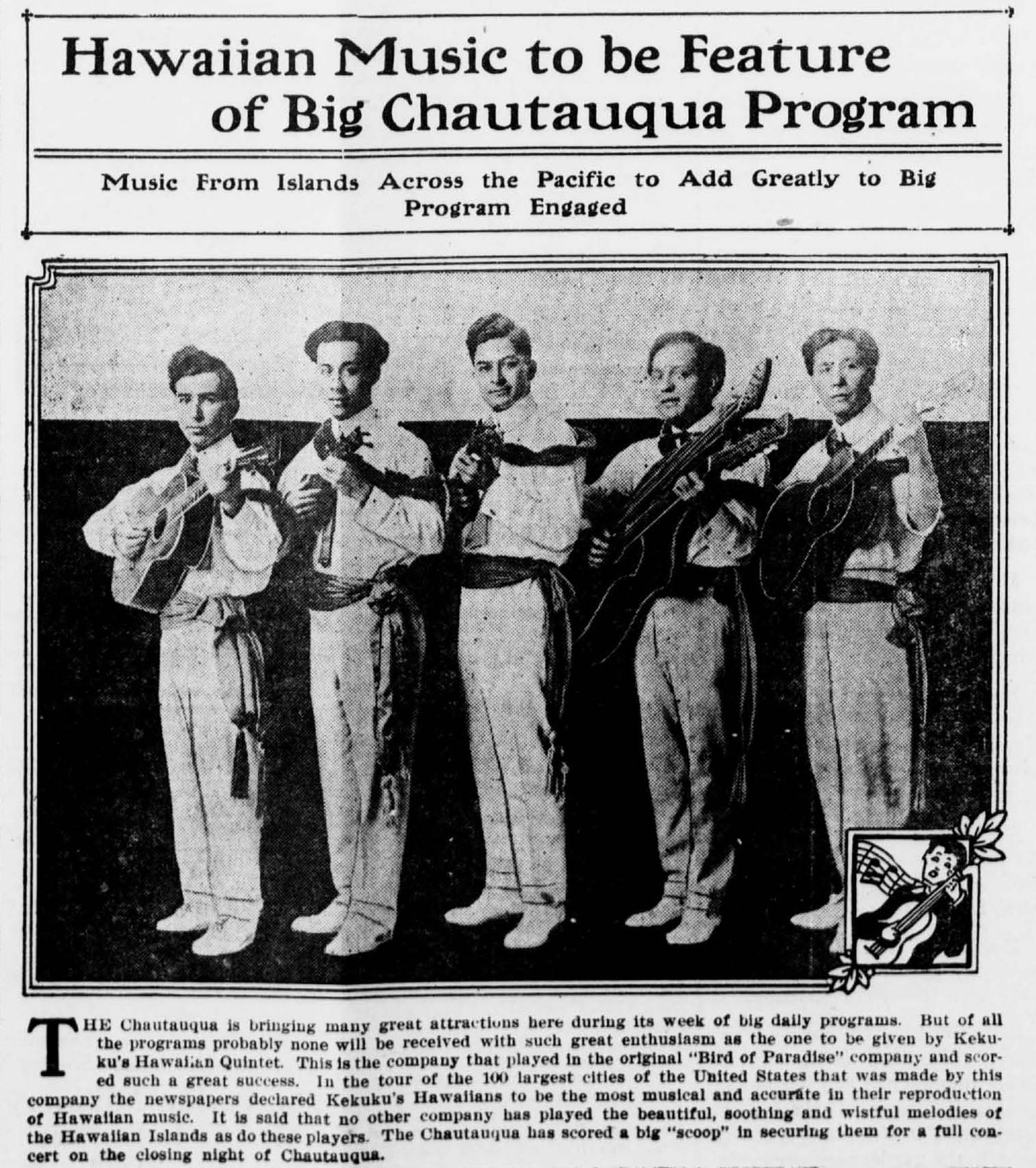
A picture of the Kekuku's Hawaiian Quintet in a 1916 newspaper

=== Career in the United States ===
In 1904, at the age of 30, Kekuku left Hawaii for good. He performed in vaudeville theaters across the United States with "Kekuku's Hawaiian Quintet", which was sponsored by a management group called The Affiliated.

In 1919, Kekuku left the US for an eight-year tour of Europe. traveling with "The Bird of Paradise" show, "which had started on Broadway, and was well-received in Europe".

Kekuku returned to the US on board the United States Lines ocean liner SS Republic in October 1926. On the evening of October 3, he performed in the passenger-led benefit concert for seamen’s charities and the Actors Fund of the United States, as was customary on transatlantic crossings. In the program from the evening, he is referred to as “Mr. Joseph Kekuku (Originator of the Hawaiian Guitar Method)”.

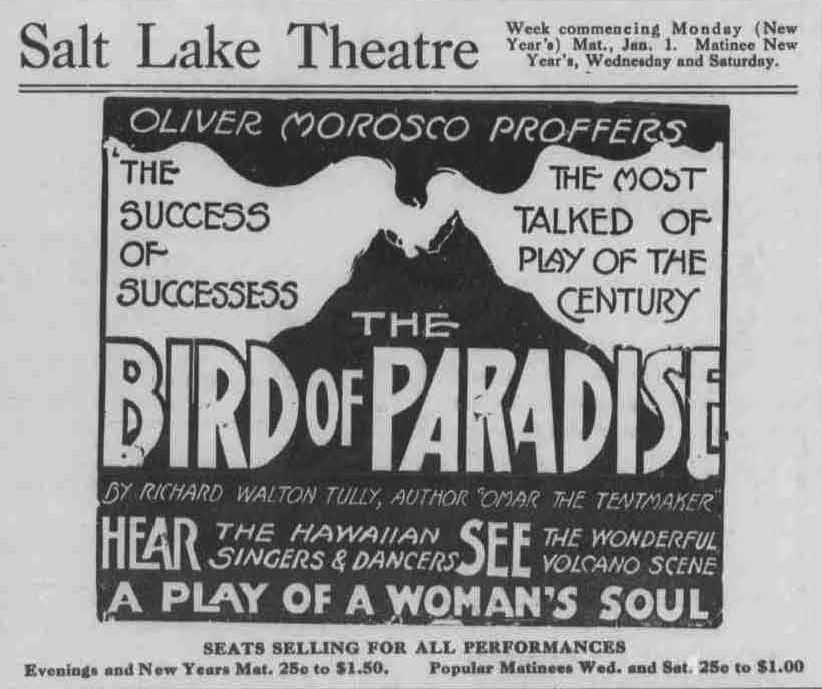
A 1916 advertisement for the famous play "Bird of Paradise": The Broadway show popularized Hawaiian music to Americans in 1912.

"The Bird of Paradise" was so popular that it became a film in 1932 and again in 1951, though Kekuku was not involved in either.

At the age of 53, Kekuku settled in Chicago, where he ran a popular and successful music school. By 1932, he had moved to Dover, New Jersey, with his wife, where he gave guitar lessons.

=== Death and legacy ===
On January 16, 1932, at the age of 58, Kekuku died in Morristown, New Jersey, of a cerebral hemorrhage. Kekuku is buried in the Orchard Street Cemetery in Dover, New Jersey.

In 1993, Kekuku was inducted into the Steel Guitar Hall of Fame with full honors as the inventor of the steel guitar. A statue of him was erected at the Polynesian Cultural Center in Laie in 2015.
