= Orchard Street Cemetery Gatehouse =

- U.S. National Register of Historic Places
- New Jersey Register of Historic Places
- Gatehouse and cemetery in 2026

- Location within Morris County, New Jersey Location within New Jersey Location within the United States
- Location: intersection of Orchard Street and Chestnut Street, Dover, New Jersey
- Coordinates: 40°52′53.6″N 74°33′39″W
- Built: 1875
- Architectural style: Carpenter Gothic
- NRHP reference No.: 100013410
- NJRHP No.: 6002

Significant dates
- Added to NRHP: September 9, 2026
- Designated NJRHP: August 5, 2026

The Orchard Street Cemetery Gatehouse is a historic building located at the intersection of Orchard Street and Chestnut Street in the town of Dover in Morris County, New Jersey, United States. It was built in 1875 with Carpenter Gothic style. The building was added to the National Register of Historic Places on September 9, 2026, for its significance in architecture.

== History and description ==
The Orchard Street Cemetery was founded in 1851 and now is 5.3 acres (2.1 ha). In 1875, the Dover Cemetery Association built the cemetery gates and gatehouse. The Carpenter Gothic architecture of the gatehouse features steep pitched gables and decorative bargeboards and finials on the roof.

== Notable burials ==
- William F. Birch (1870–1946), represented New Jersey's 5th congressional district
- Joseph Kekuku (1874–1932), inventor of the steel guitar

== Gallery ==
Entrance gates view

South view

Cemetery founded 1851

== See also ==
- National Register of Historic Places listings in Morris County, New Jersey
