= Hillside Cemetery (Scotch Plains, New Jersey) =

Cemetery in Scotch Plains, New Jersey, United States

- Interactive map of Hillside Cemetery

Details
- Established: 1886
- Location: Scotch Plains, New Jersey
- Country: United States
- Coordinates: 40.605°N 74.392°W
- Website: Hillside Cemetery Association
- Find a Grave: Hillside Cemetery

Hillside Cemetery is a cemetery located in Scotch Plains, New Jersey. Hillside Cemetery was established as a non-sectarian, non-profit organization in 1886 under the state laws of New Jersey, which carefully guard the rights of lot owners and ensure the safety, permanence and prudent governance of the cemetery.

== Notable burials ==
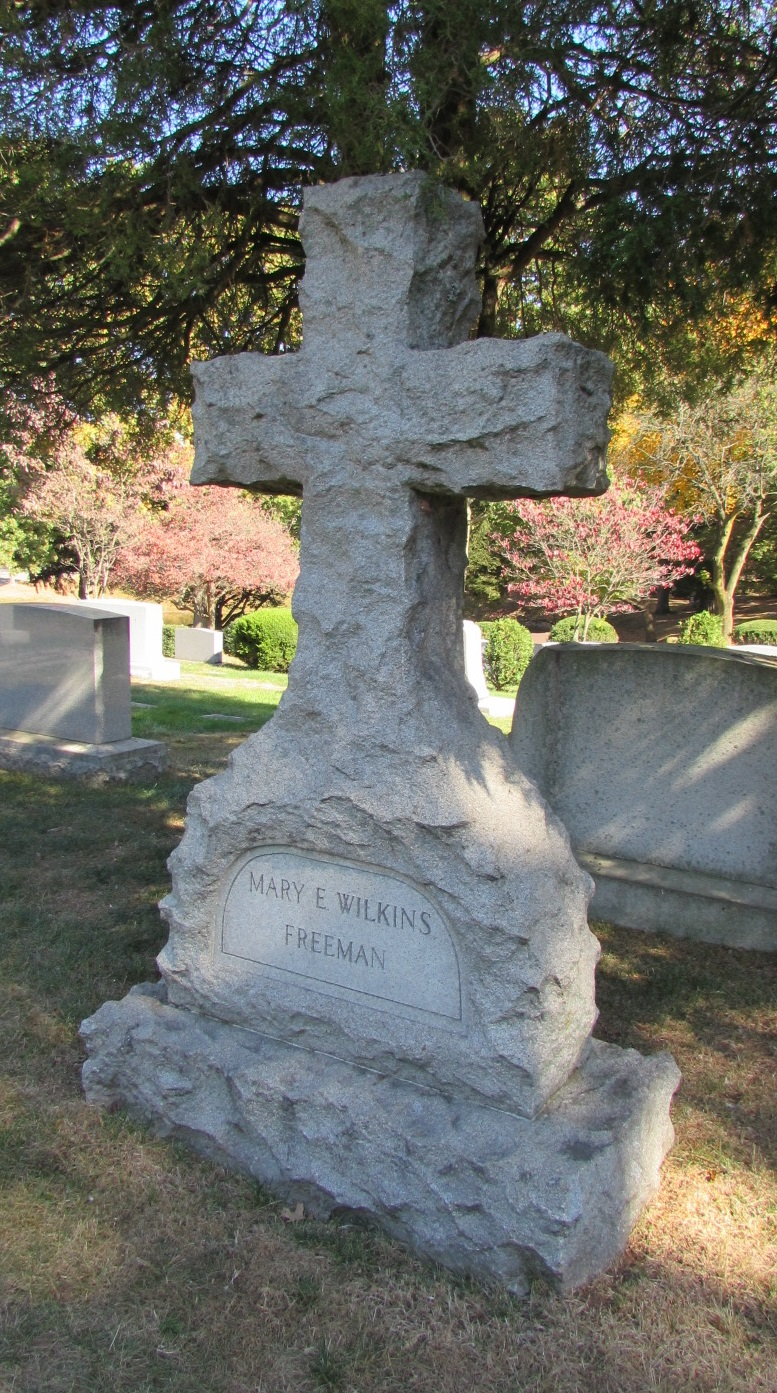
Mary Eleanor Wilkins Freeman grave

Several historical gravesites are located at Hillside Cemetery:

- Ernest R. Ackerman (1863–1931), elected to represent New Jersey's 5th District in the United States House of Representatives, serving from 1919 until his death in office in 1931. His congressional term was subsequently completed by Congressman Percy Hamilton Stewart (who is also buried at Hillside cemetery).
- Joseph Black (1924–2002) was a right-handed pitcher in Negro league and Major League Baseball for the Brooklyn Dodgers, Cincinnati Redlegs, and Washington Senators who became the first black pitcher to win a World Series game in 1952.
- Charles Aubrey Eaton (1868–1953) elected to represent two New Jersey Districts in the United States House of Representatives during a 28 years in office (1925 to 1953). He first represented the 4th District from 1925 to 1933, then the 5th District from 1933 to 1953.
- Mary Eleanor Wilkins Freeman (1852–1930) Author, best known for writing short stories about everyday, small-town people.
- Eli Long (1837–1903) Civil War Union brigadier general. Commanded a brigade, then division of cavalry in William Tecumseh Sherman's Army of the Tennessee.
- Robert Lowry (1826–1899), hymnist, Baptist minister, and composer of nearly 500 gospel hymns. His most memorable works included "Shall We Gather at the River", and the beloved Easter hymn "Low in the Grave He Lay."
- James Edgar Martine (1850–1925) was elected as a United States Senator from New Jersey, serving from 1911 to 1917.
- Warren C. McLaughlin (1876–1923), left-handed pitcher with the Philadelphia Phillies and Pittsburgh Pirates from 1900 to 1902
- Dudley Moore (1935–2002) actor and comedian notable for his roles in the films 10 and Arthur.
- William Lawrence Saunders (1856–1931), industrialist.
- William Nelson Runyon (1871–1931) Governor of New Jersey. As president of the New Jersey Senate, he became the state's acting governor in 1919 when previous sitting Governor Walter E. Edge resigned after being elected to the United States Senate, serving as New Jersey's governor from 1919 to 1920
- Julian Scott (1846–1901) American Civil War Medal of Honor recipient
- Hiram R. Steele (1842–1929), Civil War Brevet-Major, served as Attorney General of Louisiana and Brooklyn District Attorney
- Percy Hamilton Stewart (1867–1951) Elected to represent New Jersey's 5th congressional district in the United States House of Representatives.
