= Ernest R. Ackerman =

American politician (1863–1931)

Ernest Robinson Ackerman
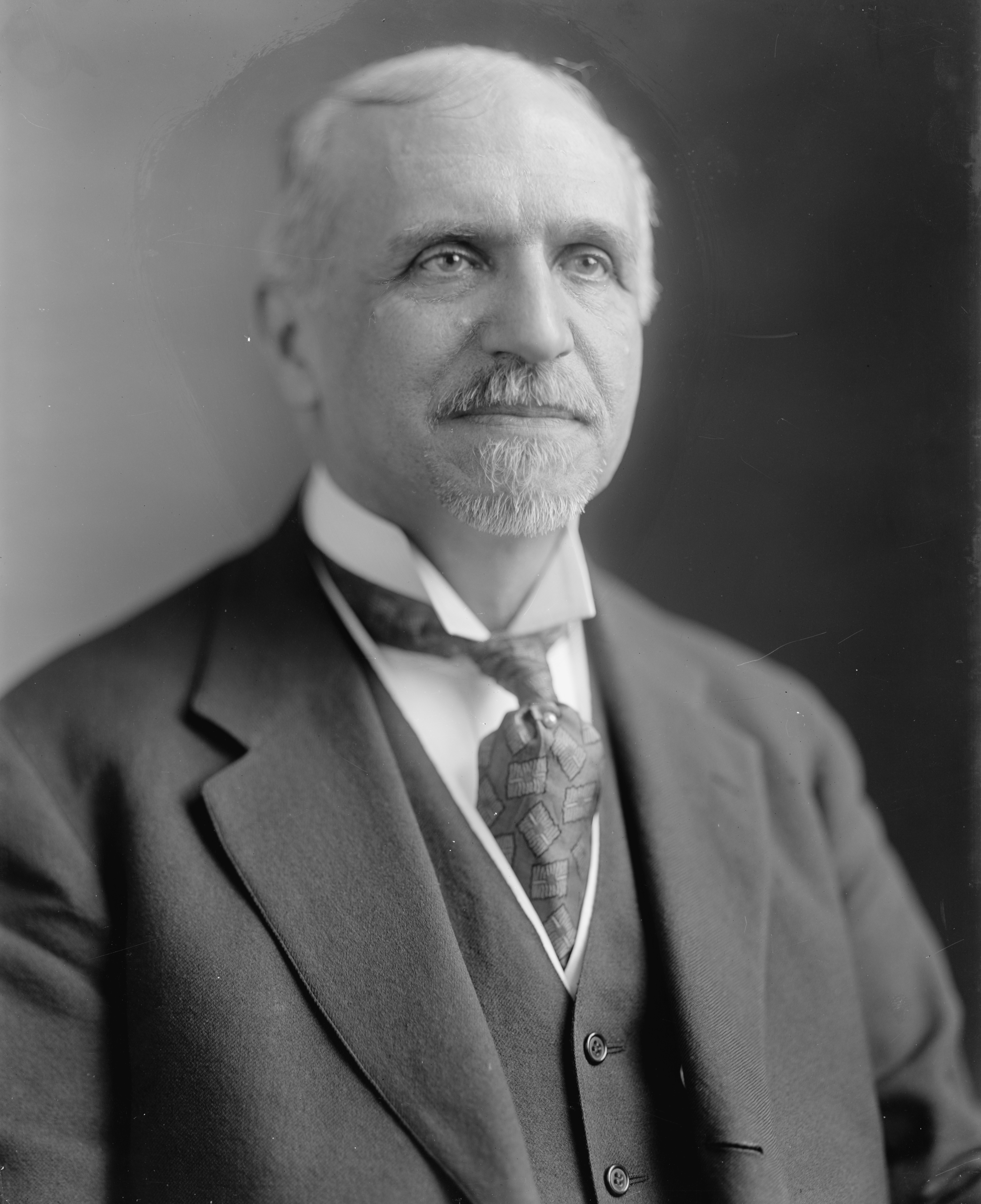

Member of the U.S. House of Representatives from New Jersey's 5th district
- In office March 4, 1919 – October 18, 1931
- Preceded by: William F. Birch
- Succeeded by: Percy Hamilton Stewart

Member of the New Jersey Senate from Union County
- In office 1905–1911
- Preceded by: Joseph Cross
- Succeeded by: Carlton B. Pierce

Personal details
- Born: 17 June 1863 New York City, New York, U.S.
- Died: 18 October 1931 (aged 68) Plainfield, New Jersey, U.S.
- Party: Republican
- Spouse: Nora L. Weber (m. 1892)

Ernest Robinson Ackerman (June 17, 1863 – October 18, 1931) was an American businessman, philatelist and Republican Party politician who served in the New Jersey Senate from 1906 to 1912 and in the United States House of Representatives from 1919 to 1931.

== Early life and business career ==
Ernest Robinson Ackerman was born in New York City on June 17, 1863 to J. Hervey Ackerman and Ellen (née Morgan) Ackerman. His ancestors included multiple participants in the American Revolution. He moved with his parents to Plainfield, New Jersey, where his father served as president of the common council and as a city judge.

He was educated at public schools and graduated from Plainfield High School in 1880. After his graduation, he traveled to England with George E. Vincent, who later became president of the University of Minnesota and the Rockefeller Foundation.

=== Business ===
As a young man, Ackerman worked at the Lawrence Cement Company, which later became the Lawrence Portland Cement Company. He eventually became its president. He also served a director of the Plainfield Trust Company and a director of the Central Railroad Company of New Jersey.

== Political career ==
Ackerman was a member of the Plainfield common council in 1891 and 1892.

In 1896, Ackerman was chosen as a presidential elector, casting his vote for William McKinley and Garret Hobart. He served as secretary of the delegation in January 1897.

He was a delegate to the 1908 and 1916 Republican National Conventions. At the 1908 convention, he was the New Jersey representative on the delegation to inform James S. Sherman of his nomination as vice president. He was appointed to the New Jersey State Board of Education after Joseph S. Frelinghuysen Sr. was elected to the United States Senate in 1916, serving until 1920.

=== New Jersey Senate (1908–12) ===
In 1905, Ackerman was elected to the New Jersey Senate, representing Union County. He was re-elected to a second term in 1908. He was an author and primary sponsor of the state's first civil service law, which was known as the Ackerman Civil Service Law. He also introduced and pressed for the passage of the state's first employers' liability law.

Ackerman also formed a special committee on capital punishment with senators Barton B. Hutchinson of Mercer County and Jacob C. Price of Sussex County, which studied conditions abroad and throughout the United States.

In 1910, Ackerman chaired the Senate committees on the Judiciary and on Finance. In 1911, he was elected president of the Senate and served as acting governor while Woodrow Wilson was touring the West ahead of his presidential campaign. He did not run for re-election in 1911, and he was succeeded by Carlton Pierce.

During the First World War, Ackerman was the federal food administrator for Union County, chair of the War Savings Committee for Plainfield, and local chair of the YMCA War Work Council.

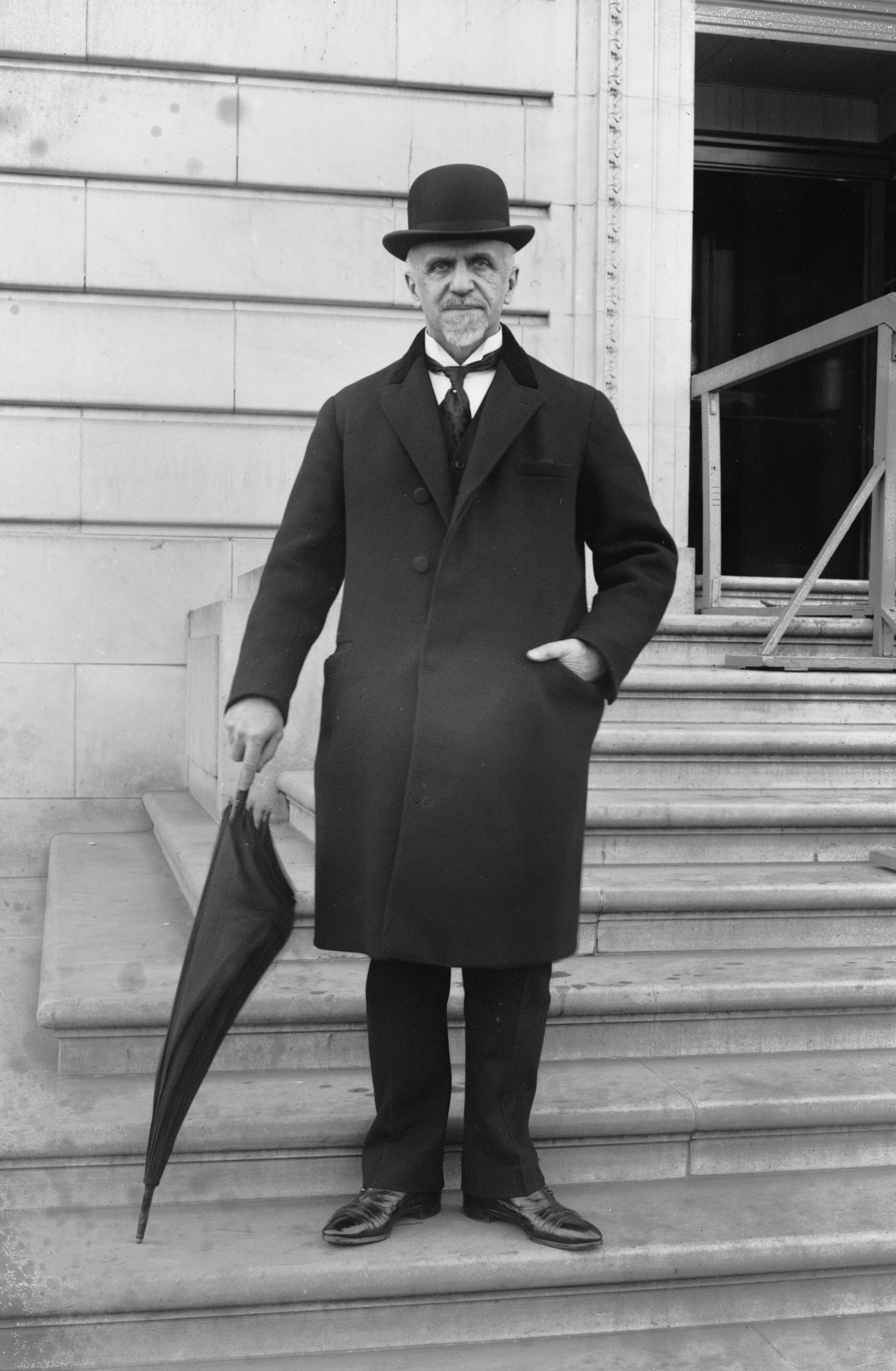
In Congress, Ackerman was known for carrying a black umbrella. The habit began in 1895, after he contracted pneumonia in an unexpected storm.

=== U.S. House of Representatives (1919–31) ===
In 1918, he was elected to represent New Jersey's 5th congressional district, which consisted of Union County and Morris County. He was re-elected to six terms, typically leading the Republican ticket in his district and serving until his death in 1931.

In Congress, Ackerman became known as a "dry," supportive of Prohibition, but he later revised his positions to support "reasonable" modifications to the Volstead Act to permit the sale of light wines and beer. He also supported the Smoot–Hawley Tariff Act.

At the time of his death, Ackerman was a member of the House Committee on Appropriations and the Migratory Bird Commission.

During his tenure in the House, Ackerman became known for carrying a black umbrella which had been in his possession for over 50 years. He had purchased it on his trip to London in 1880 but only began carrying it regularly around 1895, when he contracted pneumonia in Trenton. When he died in 1931, his Washington Post and The New York Times obituaries included a special feature on his umbrella, which had crossed the Atlantic Ocean over 100 times and traveled approximately 740,000 miles with Ackerman. He had the cloth repaired several times. According to his wishes, the umbrella was donated to the Plainfield Public Library upon his death.

== Personal life and death ==
Ackerman married Nora L. Weber on February 11, 1892. In September 1907, they attended the maiden voyage of the Cunard liner RMS Lusitania from Liverpool to New York.

Ackerman was a member of the New Jersey Geological Survey and associate of the American Society of Civil Engineers. He was a member of the board of trustees of Rutgers College, New Brunswick, a director of the YMCA, and a member of the Boy Scouts Council. In New York City, he belonged to the Union League Club and India House, a private club for men engaged in global commerce, as well as the Chamber of Commerce and Merchants Association, serving on its committee on commercial law and city traffic. He was a generous donor to the YMCA, the Crescent Avenue Presbyterian Church, and Muhlenberg Hospital in Plainfield.

=== Philately ===
Ackerman was a famous philatelist and he won many awards for his stamp collections and exhibits of postal stamps and postal history. He was known for his famous collections of British Guiana and Spain, but he was regarded as an expert in postage stamps and postal history of the United States. His U.S. collection included scarce carrier and local stamps, United States Department stamps, and U.S. essays and proofs. On one occasion, his search took him to San Marino, where he discovered a letter from Abraham Lincoln to the captains regent of the principality.

At the time of his death, his collection was valued at over $1 million (approximately $17 million today). A part of his valuable United States collection was bequeathed to the Smithsonian Institution's National Postal Museum in Washington, D.C. Ackerman was named to the American Philatelic Society Hall of Fame in 2000.

=== Death and burial ===
Ackerman died in Plainfield on October 18, 1931 of heart disease after spending a few days ill at home. His funeral was held at Crescent Avenue Presbyterian Church in Plainfield, and he was buried in the family plot in Hillside Cemetery in Scotch Plains.

== See also ==
- List of members of the United States Congress who died in office (1900–1949)

U.S. House of Representatives
Preceded by William F. Birch	Member of the U.S. House of Representatives from New Jersey's 5th congressional district March 4, 1919 – October 18, 1931	Succeeded by Percy Hamilton Stewart
Political offices
Preceded by Joseph S. Frelinghuysen	President of the New Jersey Senate; 1911	Succeeded by John Dyneley Prince
