= William F. Birch =

American politician

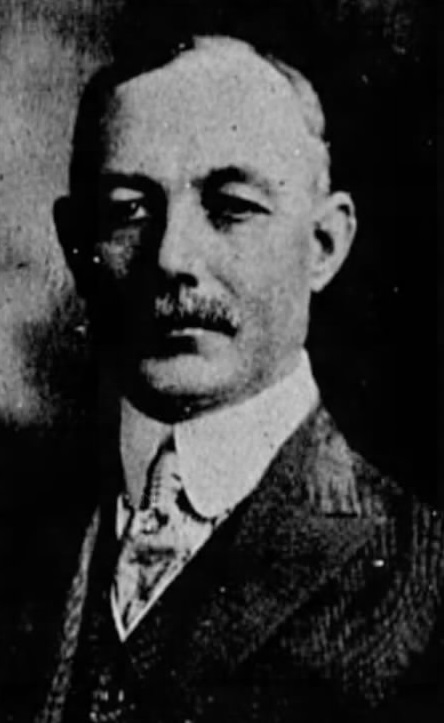
- From September 1918 Congressional campaign newspaper ad.

Member of the U.S. House of Representatives from New Jersey's 5th district
- In office November 5, 1918 – March 3, 1919
- Preceded by: John H. Capstick
- Succeeded by: Ernest Robinson Ackerman

Member of the New Jersey General Assembly from Morris County
- In office 1910–1912

Personal details
- Born: August 30, 1870 Newark, New Jersey, US
- Died: January 25, 1946 (aged 75) Montclair, New Jersey, US
- Party: Republican

William Fred Birch (August 30, 1870– January 25, 1946) was an American steel businessman and Republican Party politician from Dover, New Jersey who represented New Jersey's 5th congressional district in the United States House of Representatives from 1918 to 1919.

== Early life and education ==
William Fred Birch was born on August 30, 1870 in Newark, New Jersey to Foster Frank Birch and Isabelle (née Morrison) Birch. In 1872, the family moved to Phillipsburg before settling in Dover in 1874.

He attended Dover public schools, the New Jersey State Model School at Trenton, and Coleman’s Business College in Newark.

== Business career ==
In 1888, Birch went to work with his father in the family business at the Dover Boiler Works. He was placed in charge of twenty men, and when his father retired in 1912, he assumed control of the entire business as president.

During the 1910s, the plant grew rapidly, employing about 250 men in the manufacturing of boilers, tanks, stacks and other forms of steel plate construction. During World War I, the plant produced steel for government production facilities and the Emergency Fleet Corporation. He was an active member of the Accident Prevention Committee, an organization established to prevent factory accidents in New Jersey.

In addition to his work in the steel business, Birch became a prominent financier in North Jersey and established Birch & Bassett, an automobile and coal dealing firm. He was director of the National Union Bank of Dover, the American Trust Company of Morristown, New Jersey Manufacturers Casualty Insurance Company, and the East Coast Fisheries Company. He was a director of the Dover Chamber of Commerce.

After leaving Congress, he rose to become president of the American Trust Company and vice president of New Jersey Manufacturers. He was also director of the Eagle Fire Insurance Company and Sussex Fire Insurance Company. He retired from business activities in 1941.

== Political career ==
Birch was a member of the Dover Common Council for several years and city recorder from 1904 to 1909. He was elected to represent Morris County in the New Jersey General Assembly in 1909 and served from 1910 to 1912.

In 1918, Birch won a special election to complete the unexpired term of John H. Capstick, but he was not a candidate for election to the succeeding term. He served from November 5, 1918, to March 3, 1919 and was a member of the Committee on Banking and Currency.

== Personal life and death ==
Birch married Anna Pauline Dunham, the daughter of mayor H. L. Dunham. They had four children: Alice (1899–1901), William (b. 1903), Foster Frank III (b. 1908) and Horace Garfield (b. 1912).

He was a member of the Freemasons, the Elks, and the Rockaway River Country Club. He was a life member of the Red Cross and trustee in Dover General Hospital.

Birch died at Mountainside Hospital in Montclair, New Jersey on January 25, 1946. He was interred in Orchard Street Cemetery in Dover.

U.S. House of Representatives
Preceded by John H. Capstick	Member of the U.S. House of Representatives from New Jersey's 5th congressional district November 5, 1918 – March 3, 1919	Succeeded by Ernest R. Ackerman
