= Charles Aubrey Eaton =

American politician (1868–1953)

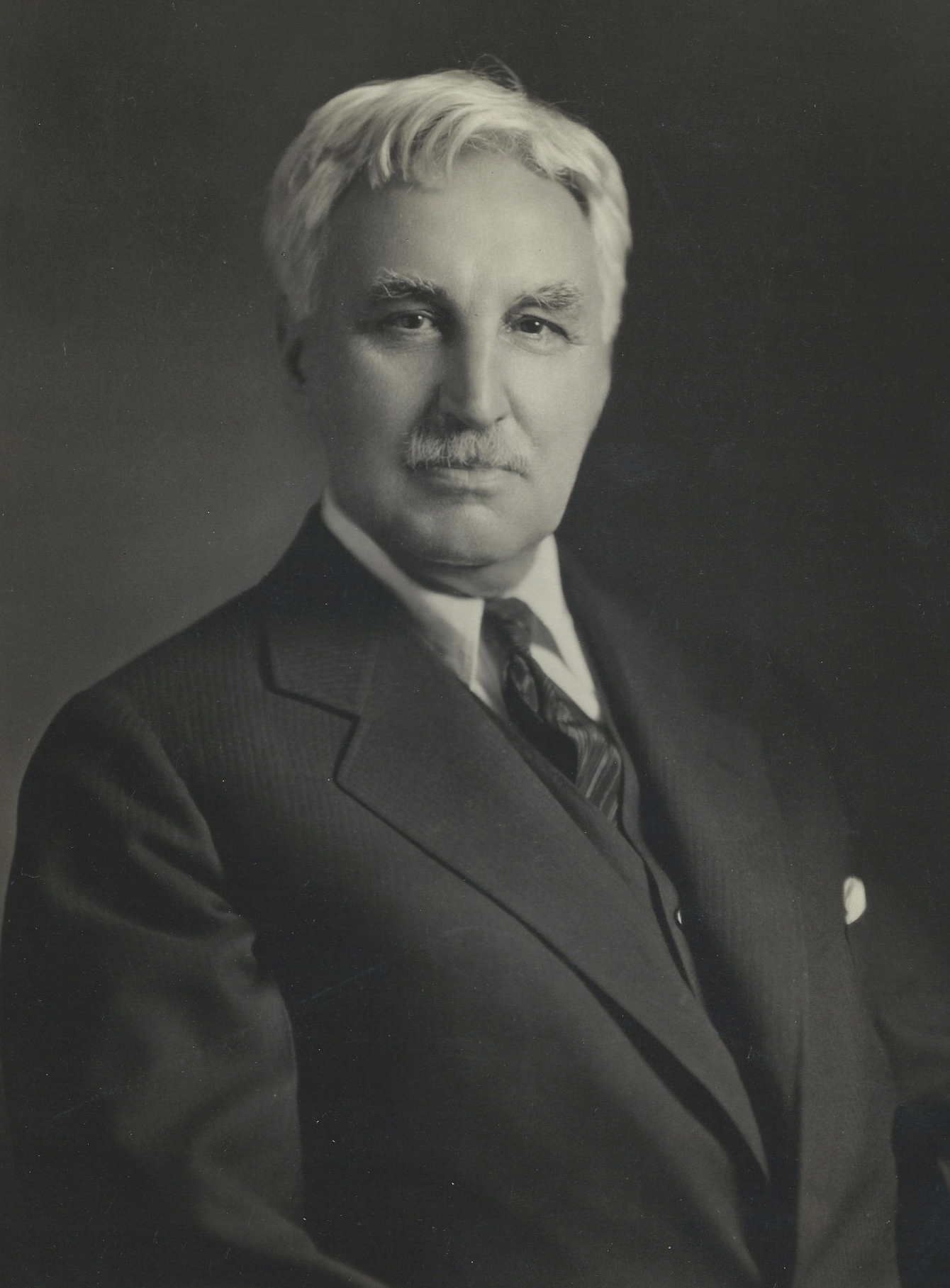
- Eaton, 1924–1929

Member of the U.S. House of Representatives from New Jersey
- In office March 4, 1925 – January 3, 1953
- Preceded by: Charles Browne
- Succeeded by: Peter Hood Ballantine Frelinghuysen, Jr.
- Constituency: 4th district (1925–33); 5th district (1933–53)

Chairman of the United States House Committee on Foreign Affairs
- In office January 3, 1947 – January 3, 1949
- Preceded by: Sol Bloom
- Succeeded by: Sol Bloom

Personal details
- Born: March 29, 1868 near Pugwash, Nova Scotia, Canada
- Died: January 23, 1953 (aged 84) Washington, D.C., U.S.
- Citizenship: Canada (1868-1895); United States (1895-1953)
- Party: Republican
- Spouse: Mary Winifred Parlin (m. 1895; died 1948)
- Relations: Cyrus S. Eaton (nephew); William R. Eaton (nephew)
- Children: 6
- Education: Acadia University (BA, DD); Newton Theological Institution (BD); McMaster University (MA); Baylor University (DD); McMaster University (LLD)
- Eaton's voice Eaton speaks in support of declaring war on Japan; Recorded December 8, 1941

Charles Aubrey Eaton (March 29, 1868 – January 23, 1953) was a Canadian-born American Baptist clergyman, journalist, and Republican politician who represented New Jersey in the United States House of Representatives from 1925 to 1953. His district, which centered on Somerset County, was numbered as the 4th district from 1925 to 1933 and the 5th district from 1933 to 1953. He was a leading voice in the Republican Party on foreign policy, chairing both the House Committee on Foreign Affairs and Herter Committee and signing the United Nations Charter.

As a pastor, Eaton led Baptist congregations at Natick, Massachusetts (1893–95), Bloor Street, Toronto (1895–1901), Euclid Avenue, Cleveland, Ohio (1901–09), and Madison Avenue, New York City (1909–16). John D. Rockefeller and his family were among Eaton's Cleveland congregation, and Rockefeller was a powerful supporter of Eaton and his nephew, Cyrus S. Eaton.

== Early life and education ==
Charles Aubrey Eaton was born on March 29, 1868 on a farm near Pugwash, Nova Scotia. His father, Stephen Eaton, was a shipbuilder and farmer, and his mother was Mary Desiah (Parker) Eaton. He attended school locally and worked on his father's farm. From 1884 to 1886, he attended school in Amherst, Nova Scotia, where he was baptized and chose to become a Baptist minister. In 1890, he received a B.A. from Acadia University, Wolfville, Nova Scotia. In 1893, he graduated with the B.D. from Newton Theological Institution and was ordained a Baptist minister. He received the M.A. from McMaster University in Toronto in 1896, was awarded a D.D. by Baylor University in 1899 and Acadia University in 1907, and an LL.D. from McMaster University in 1916.

== Religious work ==
After his graduation from Newton Theological Institution, Eaton served as a pastor at the First Baptist Church of Natick, Massachusetts. At Natick, he met Mary Winifred Parlin (May 11, 1874 – November 12, 1948), daughter of local merchant and Civil War veteran William D. Parlin and Mary Brown. They were married June 26, 1895, and had six children. In 1895, he became a citizen of the United States and was named pastor at a Bloor Street church in Toronto.

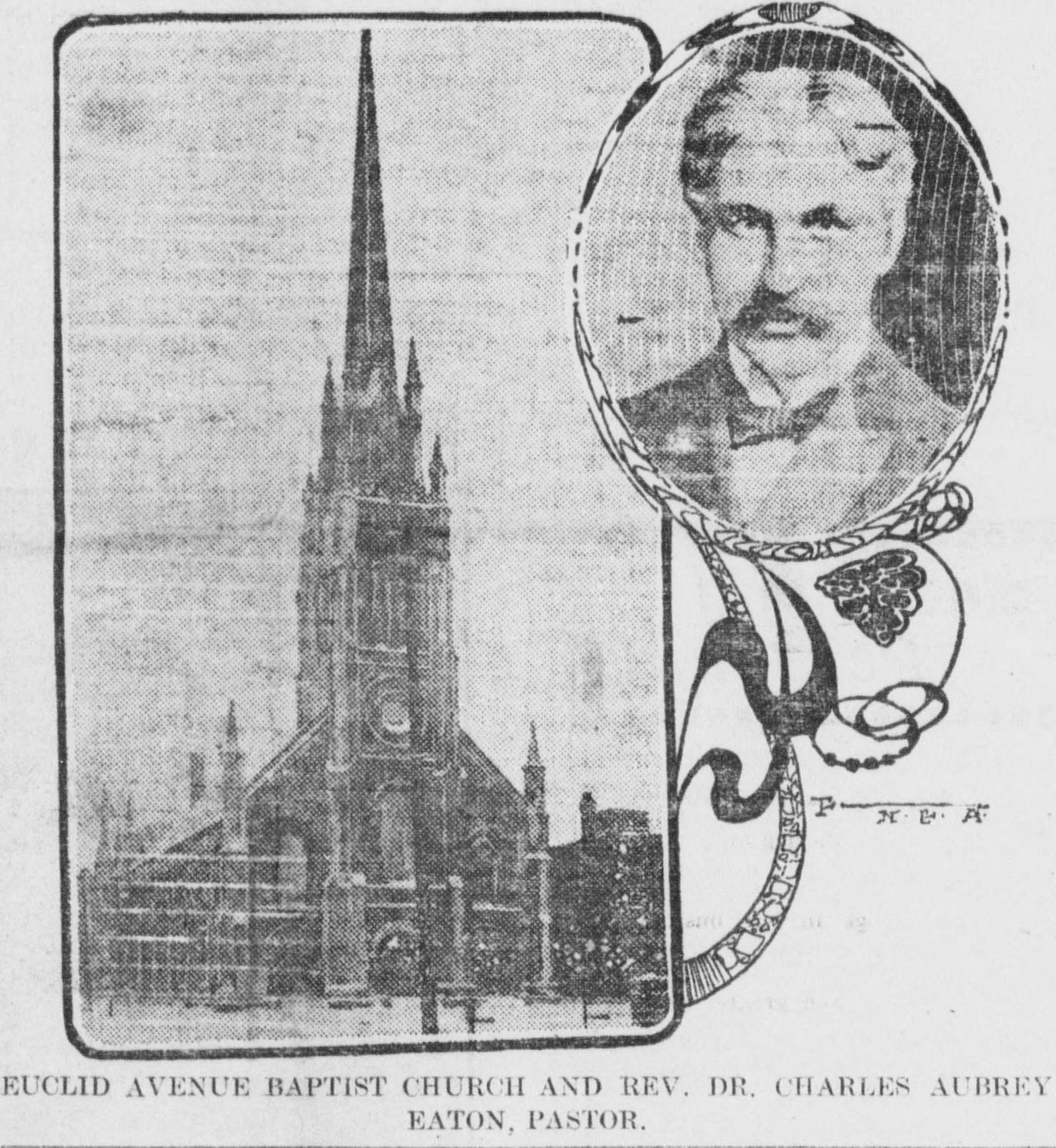
Rev. Dr. Eaton and Euclid Avenue Baptist Church

In 1904, Eaton's commitment to evangelism got him arrested on the streets of Cleveland, Ohio, for persistently ignoring by-laws prohibiting street preaching. However, he wanted to extend his ministry beyond the churches, into which many of the spiritually needy never stepped. At the same time, Eaton was the preacher at Euclid Avenue Baptist Church, situated on Cleveland's "millionaire's row", and as a result he came to the attention of John D. Rockefeller, a summer resident of Cleveland who attended church there. They became lifelong friends, and this connection influenced Eaton's future path. It also influenced that of another well-known Canadian who went on to have an outstanding career in the United States, his nephew, Cyrus S. Eaton. He introduced him to Rockefeller in 1901, when Cyrus was still a university student. Cyrus went on to work for Rockefeller, and eventually become one of Cleveland's first citizens, and one of America's premier industrialists. Charles moved to North Plainfield, New Jersey, in 1909, and started a dairy farm, while at the same time preaching to a prominent New York City Baptist congregation, the Madison Avenue Baptist Church. The area in which he lived separated from North Plainfield in 1926, and the Borough of Watchung, New Jersey, was founded there. He lived there until his death.

== Journalism ==
Eaton was sociological editor of the Toronto Globe (1896–1901), associate editor of Westminster (1899–1901), special correspondent for The Times, New-York Tribune, and Boston Transcript while in Toronto. He was editor of Leslie's Weekly (1919, 1920), and (while director of labor relations at General Electric's National Lamp Works) editor of Light (1923–1924).

== Political career ==
In 1924, Eaton was elected as a Republican from New Jersey to the 69th U.S. Congress and to the thirteen succeeding Congresses, serving until 1952. He was a steadfast opponent of President Franklin D. Roosevelt's New Deal. However, his ability to work well with both Republicans and Democrats would prompt presidents Franklin D. Roosevelt and Harry S. Truman to frequently invite "Doc" Eaton, as he was sometimes known, to the White House as an informal advisor.

On June 26, 1945, appointed by President Roosevelt, Eaton was one of the signers of the original United Nations Charter, the international organization's foundational treaty, in San Francisco, California.

In 1947 he became chairman of the United States House Committee on Foreign Affairs and of the Herter Committee. With a Democratic president (Harry S. Truman) and a Republican Congress, and with the influence of economic aid in foreign policy, the chairmanship was a powerful post. Eaton's leadership was at times strongly challenged by the neo-isolationist group in the House, but he achieved the passage of every piece of legislation that he sponsored, including continuation of United Nations Relief and Rehabilitation Administration (UNRRA), a program of aid to Greece and Turkey (the Truman Doctrine), and the Marshall Plan. The opposition to these programs centered in the House and Eaton was their chief defender. The passage of the Marshall Plan was a high point in Eaton's political career. President Truman gave testimony in his memoirs to Eaton for his bipartisan support of American foreign policy. Twenty days after his retirement from Congress, Eaton died in Washington, D.C., and was interred in Hillside Cemetery in Scotch Plains, New Jersey.

U.S. House of Representatives
Preceded by Charles Browne	U.S. House of Representatives; 4th district of New Jersey; 1925–1933	Succeeded by D. Lane Powers
Preceded by Percy Hamilton Stewart	U.S. House of Representatives; 5th district of New Jersey; 1933–1953	Succeeded by Peter Frelinghuysen, Jr.
Preceded by Sol Bloom	Chairman of the House Foreign Affairs Committee; 1947 – 1949	Succeeded by Sol Bloom
