= William E. Tuttle Jr. =

American politician (1870–1923)

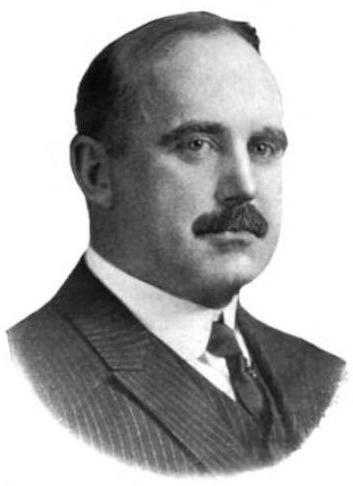

Member of the U.S. House of Representatives from New Jersey's 5th district
- In office March 4, 1911 – March 3, 1915
- Preceded by: Charles N. Fowler
- Succeeded by: John H. Capstick

Personal details
- Born: December 10, 1870 Horseheads, New York, U.S.
- Died: February 11, 1923 (aged 52) Westfield, New Jersey, U.S.
- Party: Democratic

William Edgar Tuttle Jr. (December 10, 1870 – February 11, 1923) was an American Democratic Party politician who represented New Jersey's 5th congressional district in the United States House of Representatives for two terms from 1911 to 1915.

== Early life ==
William Edgar Tuttle Jr. was born on December 10, 1870, in Horseheads, New York, to William E. Tuttle. He graduated from Horseheads High School and Elmira Free Academy in 1887 and attended Cornell University for two years.

== Career ==
Tuttle was associated with his father in business. In 1895, he moved to Westfield, New Jersey, and established the Tuttle Brothers' Lumber Company with his brother Arthur D. Tuttle. He was a delegate to the Democratic National Convention in 1908 and 1916.

Tuttle was elected as a Democrat to the Sixty-second and Sixty-third Congresses, serving in office from March 4, 1911 – March 3, 1915, but was an unsuccessful candidate for reelection in 1914 to the Sixty-fourth Congress.

After leaving Congress, Tuttle resumed the lumber business. He was named by President Woodrow Wilson as United States commissioner to the Panama-Pacific International Exposition in 1915. He traveled around the world in 1919, including Egypt and Lake Nyasa. He served as president of the state board of conservation and development in 1919. He was appointed as state commissioner of banking and insurance by Governor Edward I. Edwards in January 1921.

== Personal life ==
Tuttle did not marry. He died on February 11, 1923, at his Stoneleigh Park in Westfield. He was interred in Maple Grove Cemetery in Horseheads.

== See also ==
- William Edgar Tuttle Jr. at The Political Graveyard

U.S. House of Representatives
Preceded by Charles N. Fowler	Member of the U.S. House of Representatives from New Jersey's 5th congressional district March 4, 1911 – March 3, 1915	Succeeded by John H. Capstick
