= John H. Capstick =

American politician

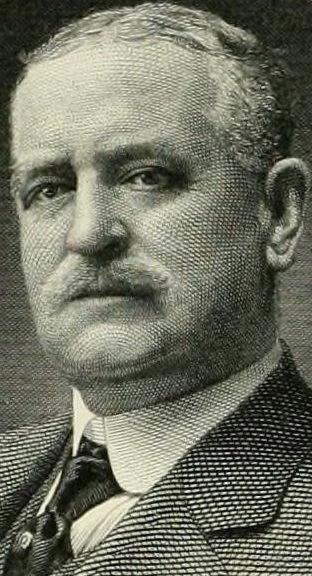

Member of the U.S. House of Representatives from New Jersey's 5th district
- In office March 4, 1915 – March 17, 1918
- Preceded by: William E. Tuttle Jr.
- Succeeded by: William F. Birch

Personal details
- Born: September 2, 1856 Lawrence, Massachusetts, U.S.
- Died: March 17, 1918 (aged 61) Montville, New Jersey, U.S.
- Party: Republican
- Spouse: Ella F. Blake (m. 1880)

John Henry Capstick (September 2, 1856 – March 17, 1918) was an American Republican Party politician who represented New Jersey's 5th congressional district in the United States House of Representatives from 1915 until his death in 1918.

== Biography ==
Capstick was born in Lawrence, Massachusetts on September 2, 1856, where he attended the local public schools. He moved with his parents to Providence, Rhode Island in 1868 and attended a business college.

He married Ella F. Blake on May 1, 1880.

He was a member of the Rhode Island Militia in 1870 and 1871. Capstick moved to Montville, New Jersey in 1883, and engaged in the manufacture of textile fabrics the same year. In 1899, he was co-founder of the Morris County Traction Company which later built street railways in Morris County. He was a member of the State sewerage commission from 1905 to 1908, and president of the State board of health from 1908 to 1914.

Capstick was elected as a Republican to the Sixty-fourth and Sixty-fifth Congresses and served from March 4, 1915, until his death in Montville, New Jersey on March 17, 1918. He was interred in Greenwood Cemetery in Boonton, New Jersey.

== See also ==
- List of members of the United States Congress who died in office (1900–1949)

U.S. House of Representatives
Preceded by William E. Tuttle Jr.	Member of the U.S. House of Representatives from New Jersey's 5th congressional district March 4, 1915 – March 17, 1918	Succeeded by William F. Birch
