= Herter Committee =

U.S. Congress committee

House Select Committee on Foreign Aid ("Herter Committee")
- 80th Congress

History
- Formed: 1947
- Disbanded: 1948

Leadership
- Chair: Charles A. Eaton
- Vice Chair: Christian A. Herter
- Seats: 19

Jurisdiction
- Purpose: Investigate Marshall Plan
- Policy areas: United States foreign policy in Europe

The House Select Committee on Foreign Aid, or Herter Committee, was established to study the proposal that had been launched by General George Marshall in his speech at Harvard on June 5, 1947, for a Marshall Plan, in part as Cold War anticommunism, which led future US President Richard Nixon to focus on foreign policy throughout his public career. In 1947, it identified a "prevailing theme throughout–that democratic leadership was close to non-existent and Communist leadership at the forefront of political shaping."

== Members ==
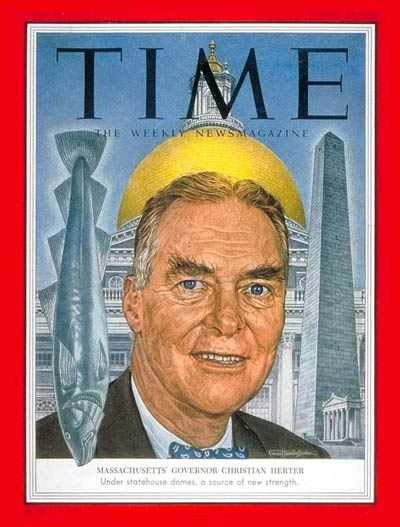
Christian Herter (here on Time cover dated 17 August 1953) was a prominent Republican politician of the 1940s and 1950s

Committee members came not only from the House Foreign Affairs Committee but also geographically and politically diverse members:

- Charles A. Eaton (R-NJ), Chairman
- Christian A. Herter (R-MA), Vice Chairman
- Thomas A. Jenkins (R-OH)
- Charles A. Wolverton (R-NJ)
- August H. Andresen (R-MN)
- Francis Case (R-SD)
- John C. Kunkel (R-PA)
- John M. Vorys (R-OH)
- Charles W. Vursell (R-IL)
- W. Kingsland Macy (R-NY)
- Richard M. Nixon (R-CA)
- E. Eugene Cox (D-GA)
- James P. Richards (D-SC)
- Francis E. Walter (D-PA)
- Harold D. Cooley (D-NC)
- George H. Mahon (D-TX)
- Overton Brooks (D-LA)
- Eugene J. Keogh (D-NY)
- A.S. Mike Monroney (D-OK)

Staff members included:

- W. Y. Elliott, Staff Director
- Howard S. Piquet, Deputy Staff Director
- Philip H. Watts, Executive Officer
- Allen W. Dulles, Senior Staff Consultant
- John M. Hancock, Senior Staff Consultant
- Julius Klein, Senior Staff Consultant

== History ==
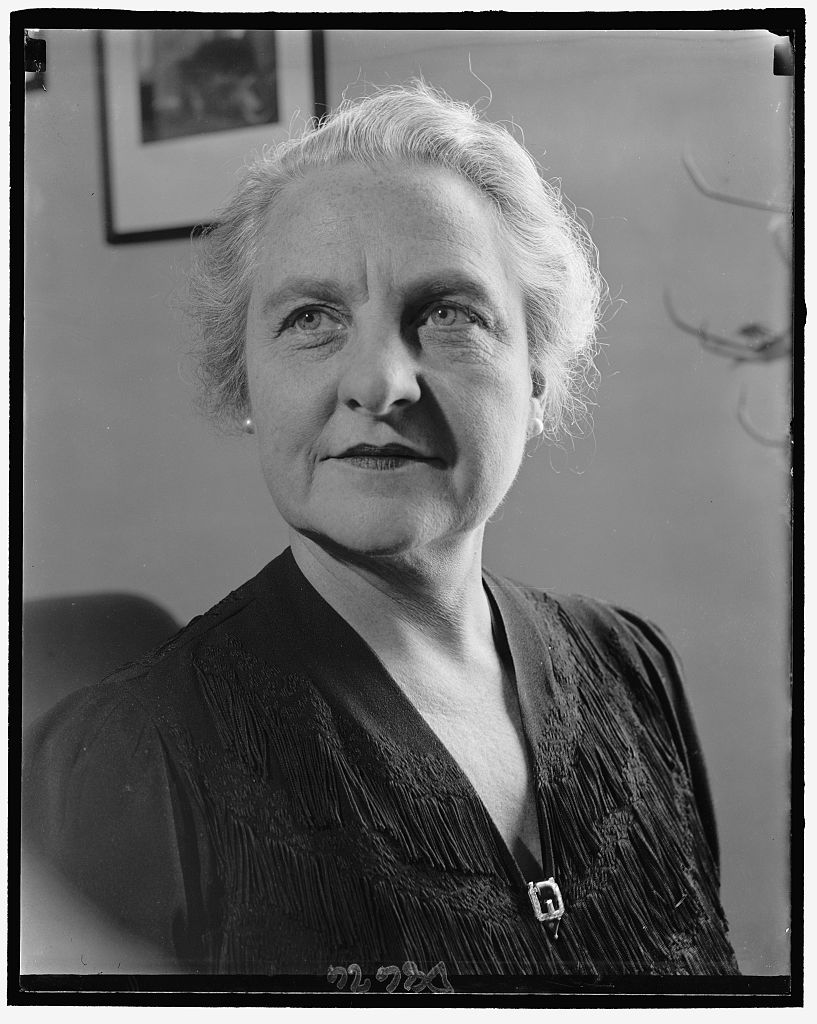
Representative Frances P. Bolton visited the Middle East as part of the committee's tour of Europe

On July 29, 1947, the United States House of Representatives passed House Resolution 296 that created a Select Committee on Foreign Aid, comprising 19 members.

On August 28, 1947, the committee and staff sailed to Europe. The group comprised 17 representatives, ten consultants, and two secretaries. In London, they met with UK Minister of Food John Strachey. During the voyage, they received briefings. They visited every European nation except Albania, Russia, and Yugoslavia. Additionally, non-committee members Frances P. Bolton and Chester E. Merrow visited the Middle East (then "Near East"), while Walter H. Judd traveled to China, Japan, and Korea.

In October 1947, the Herter Committee came back home "with a healthy and wholehearted respect for Europe's Reds." Representative Thomas A. Jenkins (R-OH) called activity by Communist Yugoslavia at Trieste "terrorism." Representative James P. Richards (D-SC) said that the committee saw Communist leaders in Italy, France, and England who were "tough, hard, fanatical, well-financed and clever"; he called it a "great tragedy" that Europeans were unaware of the degree of American aid to date. European progress was moving slowly; the committee noted that Finnish farmers were feeding cattle with "a mixture of fish and wood pulp." The committee noted concern about Communist guerrillas in the Greek Civil War (1946–1949) and the rise of the Italian Communist Party under Palmiro Togliatti. At that point, the committee planned to recommend aid but at $12 Billion (not $19 Billion) as a loan (not a gift) with an American entity to oversee not only distribution but advantages for the United States on imports like rubber, tin, and manganese.

On Thursday, November 13, 1947, the Herter Committee released seven reports to Congress (published next day by newspapers). While their reports addressed more immediate aid at that moment, they indicated the direction of their stance on the Marshall Plan. (Also, President Truman was to address Congress the following Monday to urge support for the Marshall Plan.) Herter focused on the threat of "Communist-controlled labor unions." Bolton linked the growing Cold War front in Europe with America's long-term security. John Davis Lodge saw the plan as a tool to support America's "democratic system and its moral and spiritual values." The seven reports covered:

1. France
2. Italy
3. Grain Requirements and Availabilities
4. Fertilizer Requirements and Availabilities
5. Petroleum Requirements and Availabilities
6. United States Steel Requirements and Availabilities
7. Coal Requirements and Availabilities

The reports included grave concerns about the spread of Communism in Europe by former WWII ally the USSR, particularly Italy (as of November 1947):

The upward trend in the cost of living, wages and Government deficits continued unabated during two years of Communist participation in the Government. This was due (a) to lack of political strength and to technical incompetence of the Government, and (b) to deliberate sabotage on the part of the Communists to create chaotic conditions which they hoped would make the rise of a totalitarian regime inevitable. Since the expulsion of the Communists, the Government has adopted a strong program for the stabilization of the including improvements in the tax-collection system, control over speculation, and more effective control over Government expenditures.

Frank Lindsay, who served in the OSS (1944–1945) served as a consultant to the Herter Committee (1947–1948, after which he was stationed in Paris for the Organization for European Economic Co-operation, and then worked for the newly formed United States Central Intelligence Agency or CIA (1949–1953). Later, he helped set up the European side of the Marshall Plan and helped fellow OSS officer Frank Wisner establish the Office of Policy Coordination (OPC), a covert operation wing of the CIA.

== Legacy ==
=== Marshall Plan ===
1948 label for Marshall Plan aid packages

See Marshall Plan On March 13, 1948, the Marshall Plan passed both the United States Senate (71:19) and House (333:78). On April 1, 1948, the plan went to joint conference committee; on April 2, 1948, it passed both the House and Senate. On April 3, 1948, US President Harry S. Truman signed the bill into law. In 1951, the Marshall Plan was largely replaced by the Mutual Security Act.

The resulting European Recovery Program (ERP) transferred more $12 billion (more than $128 billion as of 2020) to Western European economies and operated for four years. ERP goals included: rebuilding war-torn regions, removing trade barriers, modernizing industry, improving European prosperity, and preventing the spread of Communism. The ERP required a reduction of interstate barriers, a dropping of many regulations; it encouraged an increase in productivity, as well as the adoption of modern business procedures.

Economists Bradford DeLong and Barry Eichengreen deemed the Marshall Plan "History's Most Successful Structural Adjustment Program," stating:

It was not large enough to have significantly accelerated recovery by financing investment, aiding the reconstruction of damaged infrastructure, or easing commodity bottlenecks. We argue, however, that the Marshall Plan did play a major role in setting the stage for post-World War II Western Europe's rapid growth. The conditions attached to Marshall Plan aid pushed European political economy in a direction that left its post World War II "mixed economies" with more "market" and less "controls" in the mix.

=== Nixon ===
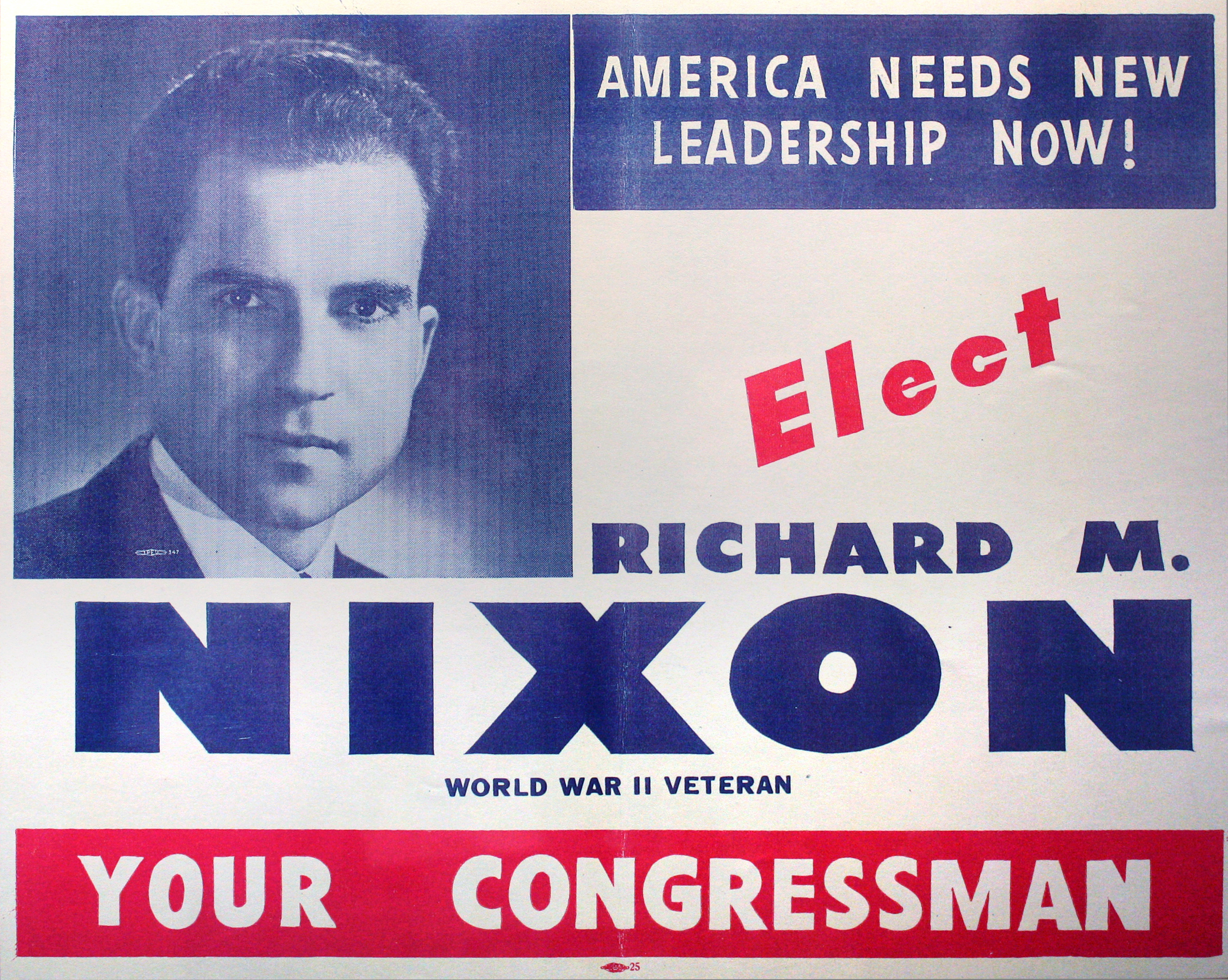
For Richard Nixon (here in 1946 congressional campaign flyer), as a result of experience on the Herter Committee, "foreign policy was the chief focus on my concern in public life."

Nixon's name appears only once and only in a list of committee members. On May 15, 2008, the journalist Daniel Schorr recalled:

He [Nixon] was a member of the House led by Chris Herter. And they made a tour of Europe to see how the Marshall Plan was working. Among places they came to were Holland where I was living, and they had a press conference, and I met them, but I must admit to you, at that time I was paying attention to Herter. Nixon was not a very big name at that point.

In his 1960 memoir Six Crises, Nixon does not mention what he learned from his trip to Europe with the Herter Committee, nor again does he in the 1978 RN: The Memoirs of Richard Nixon. In his 1980 memoir The Real War, Nixon recalled:

In a more fundamental sense, however, this book's origins go back more than thirty years, to my early days as a Congressman in the period immediately following World War II. It was then that I toured war-devastated Europe as a member of the Herter Committee, as we sought to chart what America's role should be in helping its recovery. From then on, foreign policy was the chief focus on my concern in public life.

In his 1982 book Leaders, he mentions meeting Italian Prime Minister Alcide de Gasperi during his Herter Committee trip. Nixon recalled:

Italy's most important elections since the war were less than a year away. Its Communist party was the largest and most heavily financed outside the Soviet bloc.... Italian aristocrats were making their plans to flee the country if the Communists came to power. The elections would be a crucial turning point. We knew it. De Gasperi knew it. The Soviets knew it.

On July 13, 1973, during an exit interview, Herbert G. Klein, Executive Branch Communications Director for Nixon, said:

...[Nixon] impressed me deeply by his ability to observe things almost as a newsman as he went through the various countries. I can recall him telling me that he made it a point of going to the minimum number of official functions and trying to spend his time out talking to the people or observing things in the countryside. One of the things I remember most was that he brought back a picture of himself from either Greece or Turkey (I believe it was Greece) standing by a stucco wall with a hammer and sickle painted on the back of it.... In 1948... in those days in California, you could run on both tickets, so that you could seek the Democratic nomination by cross-filing, as well as the Republican. He [Nixon] cross-filed. Because of the intensity of the activity with the Marshall Plan which emerged from the Herter Committee, with what he was doing on the House Un-American Activities Committee and on the Labor Committee and some things he was doing for the district.... The big district issue was the Whittier Narrows dam.

In 2007, Klein recalled:

...We'd go out and have a cup of coffee, and he would talk to me first about the Hiss matter, and then he went with the Herter Committee, and he would come back and tell me about what he'd seen and what he learned there, and recalled Turkey aid when he went to Greece. I remember one of the things he was talking to me about was when we went to Greece and it was the episode with Tito on the other side, and that he decided the embassy parties were fine, but he would rather be out in the countryside. So he spent most of his time, he told me, going around talking to people in Athens and their surrounding area to learn more about the Greeks and what their stands were. And I think that the Herter Committee and the Greco-Turkey aid trip with Herter really made him into an internationalist; he became a real great expert of the century.

== Works ==
The committee's final, 889-page report included six (6) main points:

1. The recipient countries should make vigorous efforts, individually and jointly, to increase the production of food and materials needed to meet not only their essential internal needs but the needs of other countries. Increased local pro- duction to assure decreasing deficits should be sought, so as to limit the requirements from abroad to a minimum consistent with a sound economic balance.
2. The recipient countries should, through mutual help and cooperation, facilitate the economic interchange of goods and services among themselves, provide effective distribution and use of their own resources, as well as of the resources received from our side, and work toward the elimination of exchange controls, quota restrictions, and other obstacles to trade.
3. Certain countries other than the United States which are in a position to supplement a program of aid, which have the same incentive as we to do so and which enjoy access to United States supplies, should be expected to cooperate each in relation to its respective capacity.
4. Every encouragement should be given and every facility extended to prlvate initiative to assume, as conditions permit, the emergency activities which have devolved on governments in the present crisis.
5. The recipient countries should adopt fiscal, financial, and monetary programs designed to arrest inflation, to correct existing monetary weaknesses, to accomplish stabilization of exchanges, and generally to restore confidence in their currencies.
6. The recipient countries should give full and continuous publicity regarding the purpose, source, character, and amounts of aid furnished by the United States where this aid is not on the basis of commercial loans or normal commercial transactions.

The Franklin Lindsay papers at the Hoover Institution Archives include the following papers from the Herter Committee:

- 1947.11.04: "Preliminary Report of the House Select Committee on Foreign Aid," resolution
- 1948.02.06: "Memorandum for Congressman Herter," suggestions about labor leaders in ERP and resumes
- 1948.03.04: "Country Section of Final Report," by Lindsay, Herter Committee report
- 1948.04.10: "The Place of the United States in European Industrial Development," by Lindsay, memorandum for Herter Committee
- Undated: "Draft of Thoughts on the Major Problems of the Marshall Proposals," memoranda for the staff of the Herter Committee
- Undated: "The European Recovery Program: Dollar Needs and Dollar Resources," memorandum on Herter Committee stationary

== See also ==
- Christian Herter
- Richard Nixon
- Marshall Plan

== Sources ==
- Register of the Franklin Lindsay papers - Box 9 - House Select Committee on Foreign Aid (Herter Committee)
- Nixon Library - Herter Committee Trip
- USDOS SUMMARY REPORT OF ACTION TAKEN ON HERTER COMMITTEE RECOMMENDATIONS
