= Percy H. Stewart =

American politician

Percy Hamilton Stewart
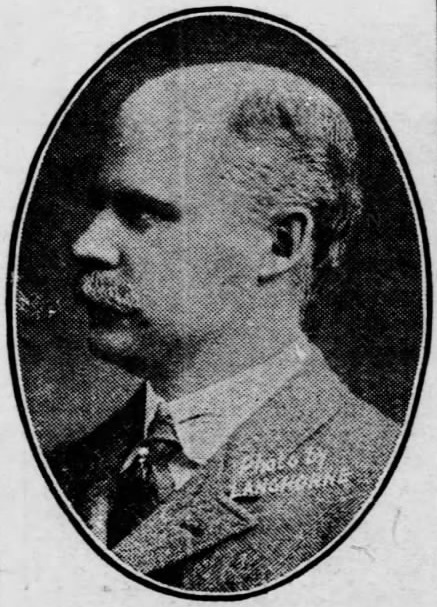
- The Courier-News (Bridgewater, NJ), October 9, 1924.

Member of the U.S. House of Representatives from New Jersey's 5th district
- In office December 1, 1931 – March 3, 1933
- Preceded by: Ernest Robinson Ackerman
- Succeeded by: Charles Aubrey Eaton

Personal details
- Born: January 10, 1867 Newark, New Jersey, US
- Died: June 30, 1951 (aged 84) Plainfield, New Jersey, US
- Party: Democratic

Percy Hamilton Stewart (January 10, 1867, Newark, New Jersey – June 30, 1951, Plainfield, New Jersey) was a Democratic Party politician who represented New Jersey's 5th congressional district in the United States House of Representatives for one term from 1931 to 1933.

== Early life and education ==
Stewart was born in Newark, New Jersey, on January 10, 1867, where he attended the public schools. He graduated from Yale College in 1890, where he was a member of Skull and Bones, and from Columbia Law School in 1893. He was admitted to the bar the same year and commenced practice in New York City.

== Political career ==
He served as Mayor of Plainfield, New Jersey, from 1912 to 1913. He was chairman of the Union County Democratic committee in 1914 and of the Washington Rock Park Commission of New Jersey from 1915 to 1921. Stewart served as a member of the New Jersey State Board of Education from 1919 to 1921 and of the New Jersey State Highway Commission from 1923 to 1929. He was a delegate to the Democratic National Conventions in 1920 and 1928.

=== Congress ===
Stewart was elected as a Democrat to the Seventy-second Congress to fill the vacancy caused by the death of Ernest R. Ackerman and served from December 1, 1931, to March 3, 1933. He was not a candidate for renomination in 1932, but was an unsuccessful candidate for election to the United States Senate.

== Later career and death ==
He resumed the practice of law until his retirement in 1941. He died in Plainfield on June 30, 1951, and was interred in Hillside Cemetery in Scotch Plains, New Jersey.

U.S. House of Representatives
Preceded by Ernest R. Ackerman	Member of the U.S. House of Representatives from New Jersey's 5th congressional district December 1, 1931 – March 3, 1933	Succeeded by Charles Aubrey Eaton
Party political offices
Preceded by Alexander Simpson	Democratic Nominee for the U.S. Senate (Class 2) from New Jersey; 1932	Succeeded by William H. Smathers
