= Elijah C. Hutchinson =

American politician (1855–1932)

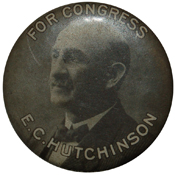

Member of the U.S. House of Representatives from New Jersey's 4th district
- In office March 4, 1915 – March 3, 1923
- Preceded by: Allan B. Walsh
- Succeeded by: Charles Browne

Member of the New Jersey Senate from Mercer County
- In office 1899-1904
- Preceded by: William H. Skirm
- Succeeded by: Barton B. Hutchinson

Member of the New Jersey General Assembly
- In office 1895-1896

Personal details
- Born: Elijah Cubberley Hutchinson; August 7, 1855 Washington Township, New Jersey, U.S. (now Robbinsville Township)
- Died: June 25, 1932 (aged 76) Trenton, New Jersey, U.S.
- Resting place: Greenwood Cemetery in Hamilton Township
- Party: Republican
- Profession: Politician

Elijah Cubberley Hutchinson (August 7, 1855 in Washington Township, New Jersey – June 25, 1932 in Trenton, New Jersey) was an American businessman and Republican Party politician who represented New Jersey's 4th congressional district for four terms from 1915 to 1923.

== Biography ==
Hutchinson was born in the Windsor section of what is now Robbinsville Township, New Jersey on August 7, 1855. He attended the public schools and Riders Business College in Trenton, New Jersey. He became a merchant miller in Hamilton Township, Mercer County, New Jersey and was interested in banking and in the manufacture of fertilizer.

=== Early political career ===
He served as township clerk for three years. Hutchinson was a member of the New Jersey General Assembly in 1895 and 1896, and served in the New Jersey Senate from 1899 to 1904, and was president of that body in 1903. He served as state road commissioner from 1905 to 1908.

=== Congress ===
Hutchinson was elected as a Republican to the Sixty-fourth and to the three succeeding Congresses, serving in Congress from March 4, 1915 to March 3, 1923, but was unsuccessful in his bid for reelection in 1922 to the Sixty-eighth Congress.

== Death and burial ==
He resided in Trenton, until his death there on June 25, 1932. Hutchinson was interred in Greenwood Cemetery in Hamilton Township.

== Legacy ==
Although the mill he owned is no longer in existence, the neighborhood of Hamilton Township where it stood is known as Hutchinson Mills, New Jersey.

Hutchinson was a founding member and elder of Christ Presbyterian Church (founded 1920; building dedicated 1924), located in the Hutchinson Mills section of Hamilton Township. At the focal point of the church's worship space is a historic stained-glass window depicting the resurrection scene from Mark 16 (Mary Magdalene, Mary the mother of James, and Salome confronted by an angel pointing at the empty tomb), dedicated in memory of his late wife. Several other stained glass windows bear dedications by "Mrs. E.C. Hutchinson" and one is in the name of Stanley Hutchinson, in memory of his mother.

U.S. House of Representatives
Preceded by Allan B. Walsh	Member of the U.S. House of Representatives from New Jersey's 4th congressional district March 4, 1915 – March 3, 1923	Succeeded by Charles Browne
Political offices
Preceded by C. Asa Francis	President of the New Jersey Senate; 1903	Succeeded by Edmund W. Wakelee
