= Ira W. Wood =

American politician (1856–1931)

Ira Wells Wood
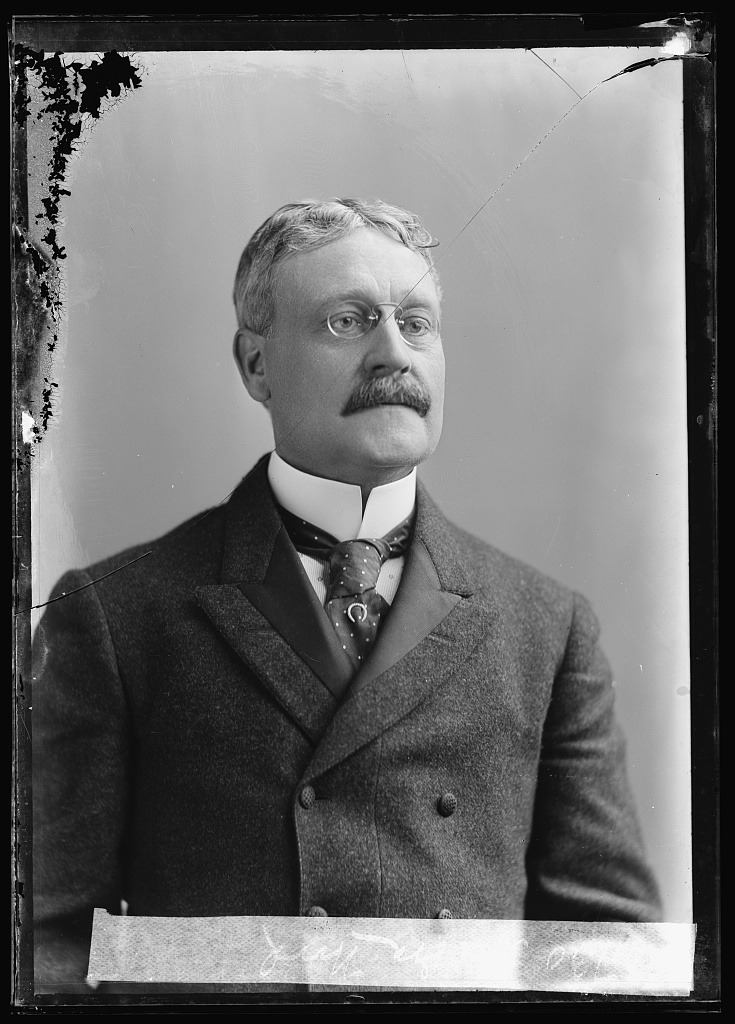
- Ira W. Wood photographed by C. M. Bell Studio

Member of the U.S. House of Representatives from New Jersey's 4th district
- In office November 8, 1904 – March 3, 1913
- Preceded by: William M. Lanning
- Succeeded by: Allan B. Walsh

Member of the New Jersey General Assembly
- In office 1899; 1900

Personal details
- Born: June 19, 1856 Wilkes-Barre, Pennsylvania, U.S.
- Died: October 5, 1931 (aged 75) Trenton, New Jersey, U.S.
- Party: Republican
- Profession: Politician

Ira Wells Wood (June 19, 1856 – October 5, 1931) was an American Republican Party politician who represented New Jersey's 4th congressional district from 1904 to 1913.

Walsh was born in Wilkes-Barre, Pennsylvania on June 19, 1856. He graduated from Princeton College in 1877. He studied law; was admitted to the bar in 1880 and commenced practice in Trenton, New Jersey. In Trenton, he was a member of the city board of education from 1894 to 1896, served in the city council from 1896 to 1900, and was president of the Board of Trade of Trenton from 1896 to 1900. He was a member of the New Jersey General Assembly in 1899 and 1900. He was commissioner for New Jersey to the Louisiana Purchase Exposition held in St. Louis, Missouri in 1904, and was a delegate to the Interparliamentary Peace Union in Brussels, Belgium, in 1905.

Wood was elected as a Republican to the Fifty-eighth Congress to fill the vacancy caused by the resignation of William M. Lanning. He was reelected to the Fifty-ninth and to the three succeeding Congresses and served from November 8, 1904, to March 3, 1913, but declined to be a candidate for reelection to the Sixty-third Congress.

After leaving Congress, he resided in Trenton until his death there on October 5, 1931. He was interred in Trenton's Mercer Cemetery.

U.S. House of Representatives
Preceded by William M. Lanning	Member of the U.S. House of Representatives from New Jersey's 4th congressional district November 8, 1904–March 3, 1913	Succeeded by Allan B. Walsh
