= Charles Browne (politician) =

American politician

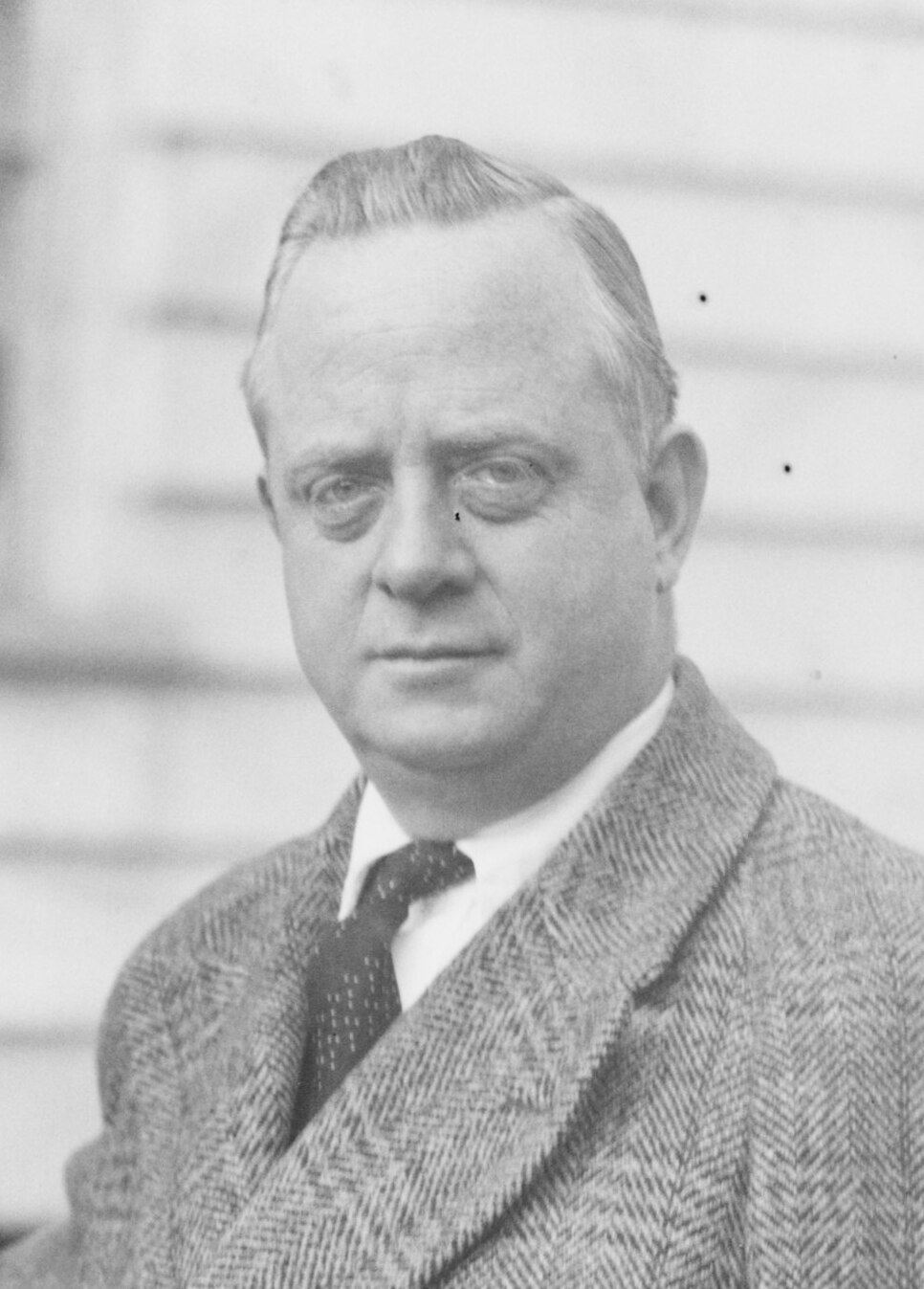

Member of the U.S. House of Representatives from New Jersey's 4th district
- In office March 4, 1923 – March 3, 1925
- Preceded by: Elijah C. Hutchinson
- Succeeded by: Charles Aubrey Eaton

Member of the New Jersey General Assembly
- In office 1937–1939; 1941–1942

Personal details
- Born: September 28, 1875 Philadelphia, Pennsylvania, US
- Died: August 17, 1947 (aged 71) Princeton, US
- Party: Democratic
- Profession: Politician

Charles Browne (September 28, 1875 – August 17, 1947) was a Democratic Party politician who represented New Jersey's 4th congressional district from 1923–1925.

== Biography ==
Browne was born in Philadelphia on September 28, 1875. He attended private schools in Philadelphia and graduated from Princeton University in 1896. He studied medicine, and graduated from the University of Pennsylvania School of Medicine in 1900, and then attended the University of Berlin in 1902 and 1903. He served as overseer of the poor in Princeton from 1912 to 1914, and was Mayor of Princeton from 1914 to 1923. Browne served as first lieutenant and captain in the Medical Corps from March 1917 to April 1919 and afterwards resumed the practice of his profession in Princeton.

Browne was elected as a Democrat to the Sixty-eighth Congress, serving in office from March 4, 1923 to March 4, 1925, but was an unsuccessful candidate for reelection in 1924 to the Sixty-ninth Congress.

After leaving Congress, he was a member of the New Jersey Board of Public Utilities from 1925 to 1931. He served in the New Jersey General Assembly from 1937 to 1939, and again in 1941 and 1942. He was an adviser in the department of politics at Princeton University. Browne died in Princeton on August 17, 1947. His remains were cremated and the ashes interred in the grounds of his home in Princeton.

U.S. House of Representatives
Preceded by Elijah C. Hutchinson	Member of the U.S. House of Representatives from New Jersey's 4th congressional district March 4, 1923 – March 4, 1925	Succeeded by Charles Aubrey Eaton
