= Allan B. Walsh =

American politician

Allan Bartholomew Walsh
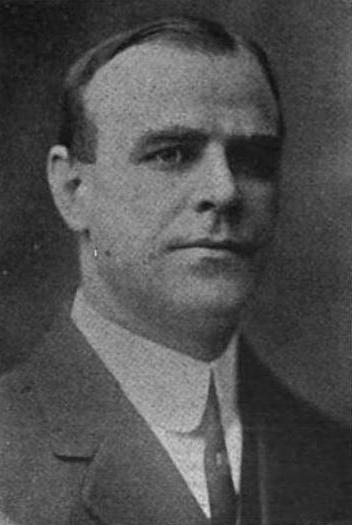
- From the August 1913 edition of National Magazine.

Member of the U.S. House of Representatives from New Jersey's 4th district
- In office March 4, 1913 – March 3, 1915
- Preceded by: Ira W. Wood
- Succeeded by: Elijah C. Hutchinson

Member of the New Jersey General Assembly
- In office 1910-1911

Personal details
- Born: August 29, 1874 Trenton, New Jersey, U.S.
- Died: August 5, 1953 (aged 78) New York City, New York, U.S.
- Party: Democratic
- Profession: Politician

Allan Bartholomew Walsh (August 29, 1874 – August 5, 1953) was an American politician from New Jersey who represented the 4th congressional district from 1913 to 1915.

Walsh was born in Trenton, New Jersey, on August 29, 1874. He attended Immaculate Conception Parochial School and the Trenton Public Schools. He was employed with an electrical concern in Trenton from 1900 to 1911. Walsh was a member of the New Jersey General Assembly in 1910 and 1911, and secretary of the Mercer County Board of Taxation in 1912 and 1913.

Walsh was elected as a Democrat to the Sixty-third Congress, serving in office from March 4, 1913, to March 3, 1915, but was an unsuccessful candidate for reelection in 1914 to the Sixty-fourth Congress.

After leaving Congress, Walsh was engaged in the real estate brokerage business. He served as an internal-revenue agent in New Jersey and Wisconsin from 1915 to 1920, when he resigned to engage in private practice as a consultant and adviser in the field of federal laws. He was again appointed as an internal-revenue agent and served from 1933 until 1940, when he retired due to physical disability and resided in Palm Beach, Florida. He died in New York City on August 5, 1953, and was interred in Our Lady of Lourdes Cemetery in Trenton.

U.S. House of Representatives
Preceded by Ira W. Wood	Member of the U.S. House of Representatives from New Jersey's 4th congressional district March 4, 1913 – March 3, 1915	Succeeded by Elijah C. Hutchinson
