= New Jersey's 5th congressional district =

U.S. House district for New Jersey

Coordinates: 41°12′35″N 74°36′28″W

- Interactive map of district boundaries since January 3, 2023
- Representative: Josh Gottheimer; D–Wyckoff
- Distribution: 86.98% urban; 13.02% rural
- Population (2025): 785,194
- Median household income: $134,309
- Ethnicity: 59.2% White; 16.2% Hispanic; 15.9% Asian; 5.2% Black; 2.8% Two or more races; 0.7% other
- Cook PVI: D+2

New Jersey's 5th congressional district is a congressional district in New Jersey. The district encompasses the entire northern border of the state and contains most of Bergen County and parts of both Passaic County and Sussex County. It is the third wealthiest district statewide and the 24th wealthiest nationally, with 28% of households earning over $200,000 annually.

Democrat Josh Gottheimer has been the district's representative since 2017.

== History ==
Since the district's establishment in 1799, Republicans have held an electoral advantage over Democrats. The western portion of the district contains one of the Northeast's highest Republican vote shares.

Since the 1990s, the 5th district has been L-shaped across the state's northern border. Rural areas in northwestern and western New Jersey are connected to urban areas in the northeast. Following redistricting in 2020, all of heavily Republican Warren County and parts of Sussex County were removed from the district and replaced by urban cities in Bergen County. That addition gave Gottheimer an advantage in his re-election bid, in which he ultimately prevailed.

Nevertheless, the district has shifted left over time. Voters in the eastern portion of the district have done so in recent elections, but not to the extent of their neighbors in the 9th and 10th districts. In 2016, because of that shift, Democrat Josh Gottheimer defeated 14-year Republican incumbent Scott Garrett. He was the only statewide incumbent to lose reelection that year and Gottheimer's victory marked the first time a Democrat won this seat since 1930.

== Counties and municipalities in the district ==
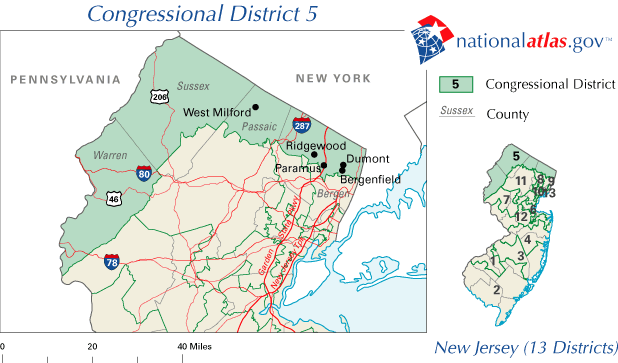
The district from 2003 to 2013

For the 118th and successive Congresses (based on redistricting following the 2020 United States census), the district contains all or portions of three counties and 65 municipalities.

Bergen County (47)
Allendale, Alpine, Bergenfield, Bogota, Closter, Cresskill, Demarest, Dumont, Emerson, Englewood, Englewood Cliffs, Fair Lawn, Fort Lee, Glen Rock, Hackensack, Harrington Park, Haworth, Hillsdale, Ho-Ho-Kus, Leonia, Mahwah, Maywood (part; also 9th), Midland Park, Montvale, New Milford, Northvale, Norwood, Old Tappan, Oradell, Palisades Park, Paramus, Park Ridge, Ramsey, Ridgefield Park, Ridgewood, River Edge, River Vale, Rockleigh, Saddle River, Teaneck, Tenafly, Upper Saddle River, Waldwick, Washington Township, Westwood, Woodcliff Lake, Wyckoff

Passaic County (4)
Bloomingdale, Ringwood, Wanaque, West Milford

Sussex County (14)
Andover Township, Branchville, Frankford Township, Franklin, Hamburg, Hampton Township, Hardyston Township, Lafayette Township, Montague Township, Newton, Sandyston Township, Sussex, Vernon Township, Wantage Township

== Recent election results from statewide races ==
| Year | Office | Results |
|---|---|---|
| 2008 | President | Obama 52% - 47% |
| 2012 | President | Obama 52% - 48% |
| 2016 | President | Clinton 52% - 45% |
| 2017 | Governor | Murphy 53% - 45% |
| 2018 | Senate | Menendez 52% - 46% |
| 2020 | President | Biden 56% - 43% |
| 2020 | Senate | Booker 55% - 43% |
| 2021 | Governor | Murphy 50% - 49% |
| 2024 | President | Harris 50% - 48% |
| 2024 | Senate | Kim 51% - 47% |
| 2025 | Governor | Sherrill 53% - 47% |

== List of members representing the district ==
District organized from New Jersey's at-large congressional district.

| Member (District home) | Party | Years | Cong ress | Electoral history | Counties/Towns |
|---|---|---|---|---|---|
District established March 4, 1799
| Franklin Davenport (Woodbury) | Federalist | March 4, 1799 – March 3, 1801 | 6th | Elected in 1798. Redistricted to the at-large district and lost re-election. | Cape May, Cumberland, Gloucester, and Salem |
District dissolved March 3, 1801
District re-established March 4, 1843
| William Wright (Newark) | Whig | March 4, 1843 – March 3, 1847 | 28th 29th | Elected in 1842. Re-elected in 1844. Retired to run for governor. | Bergen, Essex, Hudson, and Passaic |
| Dudley S. Gregory (Jersey City) | Whig | March 4, 1847 – March 3, 1849 | 30th | Elected in 1846. Retired. | Bergen, Essex, Hudson, and Passaic |
| James G. King (Hoboken) | Whig | March 4, 1849 – March 3, 1851 | 31st | Elected in 1848. Retired. | Bergen, Essex, Hudson, and Passaic |
| Rodman M. Price (Hoboken) | Democratic | March 4, 1851 – March 3, 1853 | 32nd | Elected in 1850. Lost re-election. | Bergen, Essex, Hudson, and Passaic |
| Alexander C. M. Pennington (Newark) | Whig | March 4, 1853 – March 3, 1855 | 33rd 34th | Elected in 1852. Re-elected in 1854. Retired. | 1853–1863; Essex and Hudson |
| Alexander C. M. Pennington (Newark) | Opposition | March 4, 1855 – March 3, 1857 | 33rd 34th | Elected in 1852. Re-elected in 1854. Retired. | 1853–1863; Essex and Hudson |
| Jacob R. Wortendyke (Jersey City) | Democratic | March 4, 1857 – March 3, 1859 | 35th | Elected in 1856. Lost re-election. | Essex, Hudson, and Union (Union County formed from Essex (1857)) |
| William Pennington (Newark) | Republican | March 4, 1859 – March 3, 1861 | 36th | Elected in 1858. Lost re-election. | Essex, Hudson, and Union (Union County formed from Essex (1857)) |
| Nehemiah Perry (Newark) | Democratic | March 4, 1861 – March 3, 1865 | 37th 38th | Elected in 1860. Re-elected in 1862. Retired. | Essex, Hudson, and Union (Union County formed from Essex (1857)) |
| Nehemiah Perry (Newark) | Democratic | March 4, 1861 – March 3, 1865 | 37th 38th | Elected in 1860. Re-elected in 1862. Retired. | 1863–1873; Hudson County and Newark |
| Edwin R.V. Wright (Hudson City) | Democratic | March 4, 1865 – March 3, 1867 | 39th | Elected in 1864. Retired. | 1863–1873; Hudson County and Newark |
| George A. Halsey (Newark) | Republican | March 4, 1867 – March 3, 1869 | 40th | Elected in 1866. Lost re-election. | 1863–1873; Hudson County and Newark |
| Orestes Cleveland (Jersey City) | Democratic | March 4, 1869 – March 3, 1871 | 41st | Elected in 1868. Lost re-election. | 1863–1873; Hudson County and Newark |
| George A. Halsey (Newark) | Republican | March 4, 1871 – March 3, 1873 | 42nd | Elected in 1870. Retired. | 1863–1873; Hudson County and Newark |
| William W. Phelps (Englewood) | Republican | March 4, 1873 – March 3, 1875 | 43rd | Elected in 1872. Lost re-election. | Bergen, Morris, and Passaic |
| Augustus W. Cutler (Morristown) | Democratic | March 4, 1875 – March 3, 1879 | 44th 45th | Elected in 1874. Re-elected in 1876. Retired. | Bergen, Morris, and Passaic |
| Charles H. Voorhis (Hackensack) | Republican | March 4, 1879 – March 3, 1881 | 46th | Elected in 1878. Retired. | Bergen, Morris, and Passaic |
| John Hill (Boonton) | Republican | March 4, 1881 – March 3, 1883 | 47th | Elected in 1880. Retired. | Bergen, Morris, and Passaic |
| William W. Phelps (Englewood) | Republican | March 4, 1883 – March 3, 1889 | 48th 49th 50th | Elected in 1882. Re-elected in 1884. Re-elected in 1886. Retired. | Bergen, Morris, and Passaic |
| Charles D. Beckwith (Paterson) | Republican | March 4, 1889 – March 3, 1891 | 51st | Elected in 1888. Lost re-election. | Bergen, Morris, and Passaic |
| Cornelius A. Cadmus (Paterson) | Democratic | March 4, 1891 – March 3, 1895 | 52nd 53rd | Elected in 1890. Re-elected in 1892. Retired. | Bergen, Morris, and Passaic |
| Cornelius A. Cadmus (Paterson) | Democratic | March 4, 1891 – March 3, 1895 | 52nd 53rd | Elected in 1890. Re-elected in 1892. Retired. | Bergen and Passaic |
| James F. Stewart (Paterson) | Republican | March 4, 1895 – March 3, 1903 | 54th 55th 56th 57th | Elected in 1894. Re-elected in 1896. Re-elected in 1898. Re-elected in 1900. Lost re-election. | Bergen and Passaic |
| Charles N. Fowler (Elizabeth) | Republican | March 4, 1903 – March 3, 1911 | 58th 59th 60th 61st | Redistricted from the 8th district and re-elected in 1902. Re-elected in 1904. Re-elected in 1906. Re-elected in 1908. Retired to run for U.S. senator. | Morris, Union, and Warren |
| William E. Tuttle Jr. (Westfield) | Democratic | March 4, 1911 – March 3, 1915 | 62nd 63rd | Elected in 1910. Re-elected in 1912. Lost re-election. | Morris, Union, and Warren |
| William E. Tuttle Jr. (Westfield) | Democratic | March 4, 1911 – March 3, 1915 | 62nd 63rd | Elected in 1910. Re-elected in 1912. Lost re-election. | Morris and Union |
| John H. Capstick (Montville) | Republican | March 4, 1915 – March 17, 1918 | 64th 65th | Elected in 1914. Re-elected in 1916. Died. | Morris and Union |
| Vacant | | March 17, 1918 – November 5, 1918 | | | Morris and Union |
| William F. Birch (Dover) | Republican | November 5, 1918 – March 3, 1919 | 65th | Elected to finish Capstick's term. Retired. | Morris and Union |
| Ernest R. Ackerman (Plainfield) | Republican | March 4, 1919 – October 18, 1931 | 66th 67th 68th 69th 70th 71st 72nd | Elected in 1918. Re-elected in 1920. Re-elected in 1922. Re-elected in 1924. Re-elected in 1926. Re-elected in 1928. Re-elected in 1930. Died. | Morris and Union |
| Vacant | | October 18, 1931 – December 1, 1931 | | | Morris and Union |
| Percy Hamilton Stewart (Plainfield) | Democratic | December 1, 1931 – March 3, 1933 | 72nd | Elected to finish Ackerman's term. Retired to run for U.S. senator. | Morris and Union |
| Charles A. Eaton (Watchung) | Republican | March 4, 1933 – January 3, 1953 | 73rd 74th 75th 76th 77th 78th 79th 80th 81st 82nd | Redistricted from the 4th district and re-elected in 1932. Re-elected in 1934. Re-elected in 1936. Re-elected in 1938. Re-elected in 1940. Re-elected in 1942. Re-elected in 1944. Re-elected in 1946. Re-elected in 1948. Re-elected in 1950. Retired. | Morris, Somerset, and part of Middlesex (north of Raritan River) |
| Peter Frelinghuysen Jr. (Morristown) | Republican | January 3, 1953 – January 3, 1975 | 83rd 84th 85th 86th 87th 88th 89th 90th 91st 92nd 93rd | Elected in 1952. Re-elected in 1954. Re-elected in 1956. Re-elected in 1958. Re-elected in 1960. Re-elected in 1962. Re-elected in 1964. Re-elected in 1966. Re-elected in 1968. Re-elected in 1970. Re-elected in 1972. Retired. | Morris, Somerset, and part of Middlesex (north of Raritan River) |
| Peter Frelinghuysen Jr. (Morristown) | Republican | January 3, 1953 – January 3, 1975 | 83rd 84th 85th 86th 87th 88th 89th 90th 91st 92nd 93rd | Elected in 1952. Re-elected in 1954. Re-elected in 1956. Re-elected in 1958. Re-elected in 1960. Re-elected in 1962. Re-elected in 1964. Re-elected in 1966. Re-elected in 1968. Re-elected in 1970. Re-elected in 1972. Retired. | Morris and Somerset (Northern Middlesex removed to the new 15th District (1962)) |
| Peter Frelinghuysen Jr. (Morristown) | Republican | January 3, 1953 – January 3, 1975 | 83rd 84th 85th 86th 87th 88th 89th 90th 91st 92nd 93rd | Elected in 1952. Re-elected in 1954. Re-elected in 1956. Re-elected in 1958. Re-elected in 1960. Re-elected in 1962. Re-elected in 1964. Re-elected in 1966. Re-elected in 1968. Re-elected in 1970. Re-elected in 1972. Retired. | District no longer follows county lines |
| Millicent Fenwick (Bernardsville) | Republican | January 3, 1975 – January 3, 1983 | 94th 95th 96th 97th | Elected in 1974. Re-elected in 1976. Re-elected in 1978. Re-elected in 1980. Redistricted to the 12th district and retired to run for U.S. Senator. | Somerset, parts of Morris, and parts of Mercer (Princeton Township, Princeton Borough and West Windsor) |
| Marge Roukema (Ridgewood) | Republican | January 3, 1983 – January 3, 2003 | 98th 99th 100th 101st 102nd 103rd 104th 105th 106th 107th | Redistricted from 7th district and re-elected in 1982. Re-elected in 1984. Re-elected in 1986. Re-elected in 1988. Re-elected in 1990. Re-elected in 1992. Re-elected in 1994. Re-elected in 1996. Re-elected in 1998. Re-elected in 2000. Retired. | Parts of Bergen, Hunterdon, Mercer (Hopewell Township, Hopewell Borough, and Pennington), Morris, Passaic, Sussex, and Warren |
| Marge Roukema (Ridgewood) | Republican | January 3, 1983 – January 3, 2003 | 98th 99th 100th 101st 102nd 103rd 104th 105th 106th 107th | Redistricted from 7th district and re-elected in 1982. Re-elected in 1984. Re-elected in 1986. Re-elected in 1988. Re-elected in 1990. Re-elected in 1992. Re-elected in 1994. Re-elected in 1996. Re-elected in 1998. Re-elected in 2000. Retired. | Sussex (excluding Byram and Green) and northern parts of Bergen and Passaic |
| Marge Roukema (Ridgewood) | Republican | January 3, 1983 – January 3, 2003 | 98th 99th 100th 101st 102nd 103rd 104th 105th 106th 107th | Redistricted from 7th district and re-elected in 1982. Re-elected in 1984. Re-elected in 1986. Re-elected in 1988. Re-elected in 1990. Re-elected in 1992. Re-elected in 1994. Re-elected in 1996. Re-elected in 1998. Re-elected in 2000. Retired. | [data missing] |
| Scott Garrett (Wantage) | Republican | January 3, 2003 – January 3, 2017 | 108th 109th 110th 111th 112th 113th 114th | Elected in 2002. Re-elected in 2004. Re-elected in 2006. Re-elected in 2008. Re-elected in 2010. Re-elected in 2012. Re-elected in 2014. Lost re-election. | 2003–2013: Warren, parts of Bergen, Passaic, and Sussex |
| Scott Garrett (Wantage) | Republican | January 3, 2003 – January 3, 2017 | 108th 109th 110th 111th 112th 113th 114th | Elected in 2002. Re-elected in 2004. Re-elected in 2006. Re-elected in 2008. Re-elected in 2010. Re-elected in 2012. Re-elected in 2014. Lost re-election. | 2013–2023: Parts of Bergen, Passaic, Sussex, and Warren |
| Josh Gottheimer (Wyckoff) | Democratic | January 3, 2017 – present | 115th 116th 117th 118th 119th | Elected in 2016. Re-elected in 2018. Re-elected in 2020. Re-elected in 2022. Re-elected in 2024. Re-elected in 2026. | 2013–2023: Parts of Bergen, Passaic, Sussex, and Warren |
| Josh Gottheimer (Wyckoff) | Democratic | January 3, 2017 – present | 115th 116th 117th 118th 119th | Elected in 2016. Re-elected in 2018. Re-elected in 2020. Re-elected in 2022. Re-elected in 2024. Re-elected in 2026. | 2023–present: Parts of Bergen, Passaic, and Sussex |

== Recent election results ==
=== 2012 ===
New Jersey's 5th congressional district, 2012
| Party | Candidate | Votes | % |
|---|---|---|---|
| Republican | Scott Garrett (incumbent) | 167,501 | 55.0 |
| Democratic | Adam Gussen | 130,100 | 42.8 |
| Green | Patricia Alessandrini | 6,770 | 2.2 |
| Total votes | | 304,371 | 100.0 |
| Republican hold | | | |

=== 2014 ===
New Jersey's 5th congressional district, 2014
| Party | Candidate | Votes | % |
|---|---|---|---|
| Republican | Scott Garrett (incumbent) | 104,678 | 55.4 |
| Democratic | Roy Cho | 81,808 | 43.3 |
| Independent | Mark D Quick | 2,435 | 1.3 |
| Total votes | | 188,921 | 100.0 |
| Republican hold | | | |

=== 2016 ===
New Jersey's 5th congressional district, 2016
| Party | Candidate | Votes | % |
|---|---|---|---|
| Democratic | Josh Gottheimer | 172,587 | 51.1 |
| Republican | Scott Garrett (incumbent) | 157,690 | 46.7 |
| Libertarian | Claudio Belusic | 7,424 | 2.2 |
| Total votes | | 337,701 | 100.0 |
| Democratic gain from Republican | | | |

=== 2018 ===
New Jersey's 5th congressional district, 2018
| Party | Candidate | Votes | % |
|---|---|---|---|
| Democratic | Josh Gottheimer (incumbent) | 169,546 | 56.2 |
| Republican | John J. McCann | 128,255 | 42.5 |
| Libertarian | James Tosone | 2,115 | 0.7 |
| Independent | Wendy Goetz | 1,907 | 0.6 |
| Total votes | | 301,823 | 100.0 |
| Democratic hold | | | |

=== 2020 ===
New Jersey's 5th congressional district, 2020
| Party | Candidate | Votes | % |
|---|---|---|---|
| Democratic | Josh Gottheimer (incumbent) | 225,175 | 53.2 |
| Republican | Frank Pallotta | 193,333 | 45.6 |
| Independent | Louis Vellucci | 5,128 | 1.2 |
| Total votes | | 423,636 | 100.0 |
| Democratic hold | | | |

=== 2022 ===
New Jersey's 5th congressional district, 2022
| Party | Candidate | Votes | % |
|---|---|---|---|
| Democratic | Josh Gottheimer (incumbent) | 145,559 | 54.7 |
| Republican | Frank Pallotta | 117,873 | 44.3 |
| Libertarian | Jeremy Marcus | 1,193 | 0.5 |
| Independent | Trevor Ferrigno | 700 | 0.3 |
| Independent | Louis Vellucci | 618 | 0.2 |
| Total votes | | 265,943 | 100.0 |
| Democratic hold | | | |

=== 2024 ===
New Jersey's 5th congressional district, 2024
| Party | Candidate | Votes | % |
|---|---|---|---|
| Democratic | Josh Gottheimer (incumbent) | 208,359 | 54.6 |
| Republican | Mary Jo-Ann Guinchard | 165,287 | 43.3 |
| Green | Beau Forte | 3,428 | 0.9 |
| Libertarian | James Tosone | 2,440 | 0.6 |
| Independent | Aamir Arif | 2,375 | 0.6 |
| Total votes | | 381,889 | 100.0 |
| Democratic hold | | | |

U.S. House of Representatives
| Preceded by South Carolina's 5th congressional district | Home district of the speaker of the House; February 1, 1860 – March 4, 1861 | Succeeded by Pennsylvania's 14th congressional district |
