= SS Republic =

SS Republic may refer to the following ships:

- SS Republic (1853), lost in an 1865 hurricane with a cargo of mostly silver coins
- SS Republic (1871), an ocean liner of the White Star Line
- RMS Republic (1903), a palatial White Star Line steamship that sank in 1909 after colliding with SS Florida
- USS Republic (AP-33), originally the German ship SS Servian (1903), seized 1917 by U.S., in commercial and military use at different times, variously named President Grant, President Buchanan, and Republic, scrapped 1952
- SS Republic (1920), a tanker built at Bethlehem Shipbuilding Corp, Wilmington, that sank on 22 February 1942 after being hit by two torpedoes from the German submarine U-504. Owned by American Republics Corporation
- SS Republic (1944), a tanker, was El Caney, built in 1944 at Alabama Dry Dock, operated by American Republics Corporation.
