= 1932 United States Senate special election in New Jersey =

1932 United States Senate election in New Jersey
- November 8, 1932
- Turnout: 83% (▲24pp)
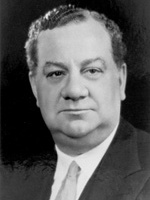

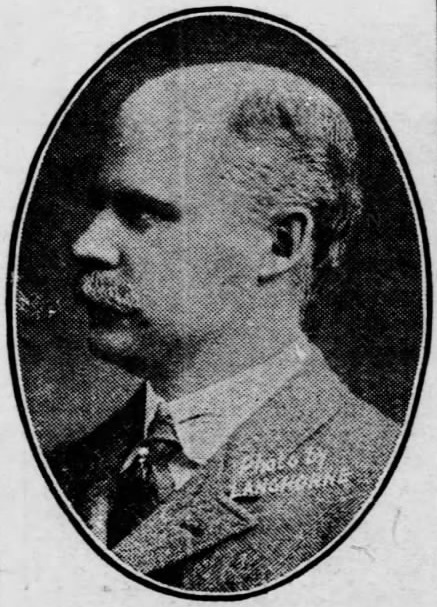
Nominee	William Warren Barbour	Percy Hamilton Stewart
Party	Republican	Democratic
Popular vote	741,734	725,511
Percentage	49.61%	48.52%
- County results Barbour: 50–60% 60–70% Stewart: 50–60% 70–80%
U.S. senator before election
W. Warren Barbour
Republican
Elected U.S. senator
W. Warren Barbour
Republican

The 1932 United States Senate special election in New Jersey was held on November 8, 1932.

Incumbent appointed Republican Senator W. Warren Barbour was elected to finish the term of deceased Senator Dwight Morrow ending on January 3, 1937. This was despite the Democratic Party winning the simultaneous presidential election in a national landslide and winning a large majority in the Senate.

== General election ==
=== Candidates ===
- W. Warren Barbour (Republican), incumbent appointed Senator
- John C. Butterworth (Socialist Labor)
- James L. Creekmur (Communist)
- Esther Hill Elfeth (Prohibition)
- Herman F. Niessner (Socialist)
- Russell Y. Page (Personal Choice)
- Percy Hamilton Stewart (Democratic), Representative from the 5th district

=== Results ===
New Jersey special election
Party	Candidate	Votes	%
Republican	W. Warren Barbour (incumbent)	741,734	49.61%
Democratic	Percy Hamilton Stewart	725,511	48.52%
Socialist	Herman F. Niessner	19,060	1.27%
Prohibition	Esther Hill Elfeth	2,966	0.20%
Communist	James L. Creekmur	2,256	0.15%
Personal Choice	Russell Y. Page	2,110	0.14%
Socialist Labor	John C. Butterworth	1,601	0.11%
Majority		16,223	1.09%
Turnout		1,495,238	
Republican hold			

==== Results by county ====
County	W. Warren Barbour Republican		Percy H. Stewart Democratic		All others		Margin		Total votes cast
County	#	%	#	%	#	%	#	%	Total votes cast
Atlantic	30,410	57.78%	21,871	41.55%	353	0.67%	8,539	16.23%	52,634
Bergen	84,603	55.89%	64,366	42.52%	2,398	1.59%	20,237	13.37%	151,367
Burlington	20,805	61.79%	11,762	34.93%	1,102	3.28%	9,043	26.86%	33,669
Camden	54,908	54.64%	40,858	40.66%	4,719	4.70%	14,050	13.98%	100,485
Cape May	9,442	60.56%	6,055	38.84%	94	0.60%	3,387	21.72%	15,591
Cumberland	14,668	57.81%	10,064	39.66%	641	2.53%	4,604	18.15%	25,373
Essex	144,176	52.84%	123,349	45.20%	5,352	1.96%	20,827	7.64%	272,877
Gloucester	17,461	59.21%	11,346	38.47%	683	2.32%	6,115	20.74%	29,490
Hudson	64,594	26.54%	176,424	72.48%	2,044	0.98%	-111,830	-45.94%	243,422
Hunterdon	7,058	50.44%	6,757	48.29%	177	1.27%	301	2.15%	13,992
Mercer	31,481	52.60%	26,229	43.83%	2,136	3.57%	5,252	8.77%	59,846
Middlesex	31,987	42.75%	42,044	56.19%	788	1.06%	-10,057	-15.44%	74,819
Monmouth	40,326	56.15%	30,868	42.98%	619	0.87%	9,458	13.17%	71,813
Morris	28,448	59.88%	18,221	38.35%	797	1.77%	10,227	21.53%	47,506
Ocean	9,833	61.28%	5,883	36.66%	330	2.06%	3,950	24.62%	16,046
Passaic	50,969	50.71%	47,249	47.01%	2,287	2.28%	3,720	3.70%	100,505
Salem	8,620	58.40%	5,843	39.57%	297	2.03%	2,777	18.83%	14,760
Somerset	13,904	55.30%	10,988	43.70%	253	1.00%	2,916	11.60%	25,145
Sussex	6,036	54.10%	5,003	44.84%	119	1.06%	1,033	9.26%	11,158
Union	64,325	54.77%	50,784	43.24%	2,332	1.99%	13,541	11.53%	117,441
Warren	7,680	43.47%	9,547	54.03%	472	2.50%	-1,867	-10.56%	17,699
Totals	741,734	49.61%	725,511	48.52%	27,993	1.87%	16,223	1.09%	1,495,238

== See also ==
- 1932 United States Senate elections
