= Frelinghuysen =

Frelinghuysen is a surname of Dutch origin. It may refer to:

== People ==
=== People with the surname ===
- Frederick Frelinghuysen (general) (1753–1804), U.S. Army general and New Jersey politician
- Frederick Frelinghuysen (businessman) (1848–1924), Insurance company president
- Frederick Theodore Frelinghuysen (1817–1885), U.S. senator and Secretary of State
- George Griswold Frelinghuysen (1851-1936), of Ballantine beer
- John Frelinghuysen (minister) (1727–1754), American clergyman and son of Theodorus Jacobus Frelinghuysen
- John Frederick Frelinghuysen (1776–1833), U.S. Army general and lawyer
- Joseph Sherman Frelinghuysen, Sr. (1869–1948), U.S. senator from New Jersey
- Joseph Sherman Frelinghuysen, Jr. (1912-2005), U.S. soldier, prisoner of war, author, and businessman
- Peter Hood Ballantine Frelinghuysen II (1916-2011), U.S. congressman from New Jersey
- Rodney Frelinghuysen (born 1946), U.S. congressman from New Jersey
- Suzy Frelinghuysen (née Estelle, 1911–1988), American artist
- Theodore Frelinghuysen (1787–1862) New Jersey Attorney General, U.S. senator, and mayor of Newark, New Jersey
- Theodorus Jacobus Frelinghuysen (1691–1748), Dutch immigrant to U.S. and theologian
- Theodorus Jacobus Frelinghuysen II (1724–1761), theologian

=== People with the given name ===
- Carl Frelinghuysen Gould (1873-1939), American architect
- Theodore Frelinghuysen Jewell (1844-1932), U.S. Navy admiral
- Theodore Frelinghuysen Seward (1835-1902), American musician, writer and educator
- Theodore Frelinghuysen Singiser (1845–1907), American politician

== Places ==
- Frelinghuysen Township, New Jersey
- Frelinghuysen Avenue in Newark, New Jersey
- Frelinghuysen Road in Piscataway, New Jersey

== Things ==
- Frelinghuysen Arboretum, Morristown, New Jersey
- General John Frelinghuysen House, building on the National Register of Historic Places in Raritan, New Jersey
- Frelinghuysen University, a defunct historically Black university in Washington, D.C.

== See also ==
- Johann Anastasius Freylinghausen
