= Frelinghuysen family =

Political family in New Jersey, US

Frelinghuysen
- Etymology: Habitational name from a place called Frelinghuizen
- Origin: Netherlands
- Connected families: Cabot family Lodge family Havemeyer family
- Estates: Frelinghuysen Homestead; Frelinghuysen Arboretum

The Frelinghuysen family (/ˈfreɪlɪŋhaɪsən/ FRAY-ling-hy-sən, /ˈfriːlɪŋhaɪzən/ FREE-ling-hy-zən or /ˌfriːlɪŋˈhaɪsən/ FREE-ling-HY-sən) is an American political dynasty, primarily based in New Jersey, that first emigrated from The Netherlands in 1720.

== History ==
In 1720, Theodorus Jacobus Frelinghuysen came from The Netherlands to the Raritan Valley in the Province of New Jersey, then a Royal Colony of Great Britain. He was an evangelizing Dutch-Reformed minister during the period of religious fervor known as the Great Awakening. The family has had Frelinghuysen Middle School in Morristown named after them.

=== Politics ===
Four Frelinghuysens have served as United States senators for New Jersey:

- Frederick Frelinghuysen (1793-1796), a Revolutionary War officer and delegate to the Second Continental Congress.
- Theodore Frelinghuysen (1829-1835), who later became the mayor of Newark and the seventh president of Rutgers University.
- Frederick T. Frelinghuysen (1871-1877), who later served as United States Secretary of State under Chester A. Arthur and Grover Cleveland.
- Joseph S. Frelinghuysen Sr. (1917-1923), who had previously served as president of the New Jersey Senate.

In addition, two Frelinghuysens have served as United States representatives from New Jersey:

- Peter Frelinghuysen Jr., New Jersey's 5th congressional district (1953-1975).
- Rodney Frelinghuysen, New Jersey's 11th congressional district (1995-2019), and chair of the House Appropriations Committee (2017-2019).

== Family tree ==
- Johannes Henrich Frelinghaus m. Anna Margaretha Brüggeman
  - Theodorus Jacobus Frelinghuysen (ca. 1691 – ca. 1747/49) m. Eva Terhune (ca. 1696 – ca. 1750)
    - Theodorus Jacobus Frelinghuysen (ca. 1723/24 – ca. 1759/60/1761) m. Elizabeth Symes (1736–1801)
    - John Frelinghuysen (1727–1754) m. Dina Van Bergh (1825–1807)
      - Frederick Frelinghuysen (1753–1804) 1st m. Gertrude Schenck (1752/53–1794); 2nd m. Ann Yard (1764–1839)
        - John Frederick Frelinghuysen (1776–1833) 1st m. Louisa Mercer; 2nd m. Elizabeth Mercereau Van Vechten
          - Frederick Frelinghuysen (1818–1891) m. Victoria Bowen Sherman (1830–1914)
            - Joseph Sherman Frelinghuysen Sr. (1869–1948) m. Emily Macy Brewster
              - Joseph Sherman Frelinghuysen Jr. (1912–2005) m. Emily Lawrance (1911–2004) (daughter of Charles Lawrance)
                - Barbara Frelinghuysen m. Thomas C. Israel
                - Joseph S. Frelinghuysen III
                - Margaret Lawrance Frelinghuysen m. Paul Alfred Kurzman
                - Susan Emily Frelinghuysen m. 1981 Robert Dudley van Roijen. (nephew of John P. Humes and grandson of Herman van Roijen)
        - Theodore Frelinghuysen (1787–1862) 1st m. Charlotte Mercer (ca. 1790–1854); 2nd m. Harriet Pumpelly (1815–1876)
        - Frederick Frelinghuysen (1788–1820) m. Mary Dumont
          - Frederick Theodore Frelinghuysen (1817–1885) m. Matilda Elizabeth Griswold (1817–1889)
            - Frederick Frelinghuysen (1848–1924) m. Estelle Burnet Kinney (1868–1931)
              - Suzy Frelinghuysen (1911–1988) m. George Lovett Kingsland Morris (1905–1975)
            - George Griswold Frelinghuysen (1851–1936) m. Sarah Linen Ballantine (1885–1940)
              - Peter H. B. Frelinghuysen (1882–1959) m. Adaline Havemeyer (1884–1963)
                - Peter Frelinghuysen Jr. (1916–2011) m. Beatrice Sterling Procter (d. 1996)
                  - Peter Frelinghuysen III
                  - Rodney Frelinghuysen (b. 1946) m. Virginia Robinson
                  - Frederick Frelinghuysen
                  - Beatrice Sterling Frelinghuysen m. 1970: Peter Portner van Roijen
                  - Adaline Havemeyer Frelinghuysen m. 1988: Gerald Ogilvie Laing (1936–2011)
            - Theodore Frelinghuysen (1860–1928) m. 1885: Alice Dudley Coats (1861–1889) m. 1898: Elizabeth Mary Thompson (1871–1967)
            - Matilda Griswold Frelinghuysen (1864–1926) m. Henry Winthrop Gray (b. 1840)
            - Sarah Frelinghuysen (b. 1851) m. John J. Davis (b. 1851)
              - Mathilda Frelinghuysen Davis (1876–1960) m. George Cabot Lodge (1873–1909)
                - Henry Cabot Lodge Jr. (1902–1985) m. Emily Esther Sears (d. 1992)
                - John Davis Lodge (1903–1985) m. Francesca Braggiotti (1902–1998)
                - Helena Lodge (1905–1998) m. Edouard de Streel
