= Peter Frelinghuysen =

Peter Frelinghuysen may refer to:

- Peter Frelinghuysen Jr. (1916–2011), American politician and attorney
- Peter H. B. Frelinghuysen (1882–1959), his father, American lawyer and banker
