= Peter H. B. Frelinghuysen =

American lawyer (1882–1959)

- Born: Peter Hood Ballantine Frelinghuysen; September 15, 1882; Morris Plains, New Jersey, U.S.
- Died: March 11, 1959 (aged 76); Morristown, New Jersey, U.S.
- Education: Morristown School
- Alma mater: Princeton University; Columbia Law School
- Spouse: Adaline Havemeyer (m. 1907)
- Children: 4, including Peter Jr.
- Parent(s): George Griswold Frelinghuysen; Sara Linen Ballantine
- Relatives: Peter Ballantine (great-grandfather)
- Family: Frelinghuysen

Peter Hood Ballantine Frelinghuysen (September 15, 1882 – March 11, 1959) was an American lawyer and banker. He practiced law in New York and New Jersey and later served as a director of the Howard Savings Institution of Newark, New Jersey, and the Morristown Trust Company.

== Early life ==
Frelinghuysen (pronounced FREE-ling-high-zen) was born on September 15, 1882, in the Littleton section of Morris Plains, New Jersey. He was the son of George Griswold Frelinghuysen, from Dutch descent, and the former Sara Linen Ballantine (1858–1940). He had one sibling, Matilda Elizabeth Frelinghuysen, who did not marry.

His maternal grandfather was Peter Hood Ballantine and his great-grandfather was Peter Ballantine, the prominent New Jersey brewer who founded Ballantine Brewery in Newark. His paternal grandparents were Matilda Elizabeth (née Griswold) Frelinghuysen and Frederick Theodore Frelinghuysen, a lawyer who served as a U.S. Senator and later as Secretary of State under President Chester A. Arthur. Among his large extended family was aunt Matilda Griswold Frelinghuysen, (wife of Henry Winthrop Gray), Charlotte Louisa Frelinghuysen; uncle Frederick Frelinghuysen, (Note: Through his uncle Frederick, he was the a cousin of George Griswold Frelinghuysen II, who married Anne de Smolianinof; Estelle C. "Suzy" Frelinghuysen, who married fellow painter George Lovett Kingsland Morris; Frederick Frelinghuysen; Thomas Frelinghuysen; and Theodore Frelinghuysen.) uncle Theodore Frelinghuysen; and aunt Sarah Helen Frelinghuysen, (wife of John Davis and, later, Charles L. McCawley). (Note: Through his aunt Sarah, he was a first cousin of Mathilda Elizabeth Frelinghuysen (née Davis) Lodge (1876–1960), who married George Cabot Lodge, parents of Henry Cabot Lodge Jr. (1902–1985), the diplomat and United States senator from Massachusetts.)

After attending the Morristown School, he graduated from Princeton University in 1904, followed by Columbia Law School, where he was a classmate of future President Franklin D. Roosevelt.

== Career ==
After graduating from law school, Frelinghuysen was admitted to the bar and practiced law in New York and New Jersey. He later served as a director of the Howard Savings Institution of Newark, New Jersey, and the Morristown Trust Company.

For nearly half a century, he was in the cattle business and owned a "prize herd of Jersey cattle" at his Twin Oaks Farm in Morristown.

== Personal life ==
On February 7, 1907, Frelinghuysen was married to Adaline Havemeyer (1884–1963). She was the daughter of Henry Osborne Havemeyer, president of the American Sugar Refining Company. Franklin D. Roosevelt was an usher at the wedding. Together, they were the parents of:

- Frederica Louisine Frelinghuysen (1909–1995), who married Richard High Carleton (1908–1950) in 1930. They divorced in 1936, and she married Huntington Denton Sheldon in 1938. They also divorced and she married, thirdly, James Thomas Emert (1907–1989) in 1942.
- George Griswold Frelinghuysen (1911–2004), an interior designer.
- Henry Osborn Havemeyer Frelinghuysen (1916–1994), who married Marian Kingsland, a granddaughter of George Lovett Kingsland and the former wife of Count Hans Christoph Seherr-Thoss.
- Peter Hood Ballantine Frelinghuysen II (1916–2011), a U.S. Representative who married Beatrice Sterling Procter, a descendant of a founder of Procter & Gamble, in 1940.

He served as president of the Gulf Stream Golf Club in Delray Beach, Florida, and the Morris County Golf Club.

After a long illness, Frelinghuysen died on March 11, 1959, at the Morristown Memorial Hospital in Morristown, New Jersey. His funeral was held at St. Peter's Episcopal Church in Morristown. His widow, who bred miniature poodles, died in Palm Beach, Florida, in April 1963.
