= Gerald Laing =

British artist (1936–2011)

- Born: Gerald Ogilvie-Laing; 11 February 1936; Newcastle upon Tyne, England
- Died: 23 November 2011 (aged 75); Kinkell, Scotland
- Education: Berkhamsted School
- Alma mater: Royal Military Academy Sandhurst; Saint Martin's School of Art
- Occupations: Artist, sculptor
- Spouses: Jennifer Anne Redway (m. 1962; div. 1967) Galina Vassilovna Golikova (m. 1969; div. 1983) Adaline Havemeyer Frelinghuysen (m. 1988)
- Children: 6

Gerald Ogilvie-Laing (11 February 1936 – 23 November 2011) was a British pop artist and sculptor. He lived in the Scottish Highlands.

== Early life ==
Laing was born in Newcastle upon Tyne on 11 February 1936, a son of Maj. and Mrs. Gerald Ogilvie-Laing He grew up during World War II and experienced the Battle of Britain as young boy.

== Education ==
He was educated at Berkhamsted School, an independent school in Berkhamsted, Hertfordshire, and attended the Royal Military Academy Sandhurst and served with the Royal Northumberland Fusiliers as a lieutenant in Ireland and Germany. He moved on from the military and attended Saint Martin's School of Art in London. "I loved Sandhurst because in its own terms it was perfect. It was quite hard, quite arcane, but it worked incredibly well. But I found the army incredibly boring and unsatisfactory. It just wasn't perfect any more."

At the beginning of the 1960s, while still at Saint Martin's, Laing was introduced to artists in New York City, meeting Andy Warhol, Roy Lichtenstein, James Rosenquist, and Robert Indiana. After art school he moved to New York, and his art career began to take off.

== Career ==
Laing's career took him from the avant-garde world of 1960s pop art, through minimalist sculpture, followed by representational sculpture and then back full circle to his pop art roots. He also taught sculpture at the University of New Mexico and at Columbia University in New York City.

In 1993 the Fruitmarket Gallery in Edinburgh staged a retrospective exhibition of his work.

In 2012 Sims Reed Gallery staged an exhibition of his prints and multiples, his most comprehensive show of work to date.

Laing did a series of anti-war paintings, based primarily on photographs from the atrocities at Abu Ghraib. These paintings were the beginning of his return to pop art. They were followed in 2004 by a series of Amy Winehouse paintings, as well as a painting of Victoria Beckham and Kate Moss.

On 19 February 2012 a bronze sculpture by Laing, Dreamer, was stolen from Kelvingrove Art Gallery and Museum in Glasgow.

In February 2014, Laing's Brigitte Bardot painting from 1963 work sold for £902,500 in an auction at Christie's in London, a record sum for the artist.

Sims Reed Gallery represents the Estate of Gerald Laing.

=== Notable works ===
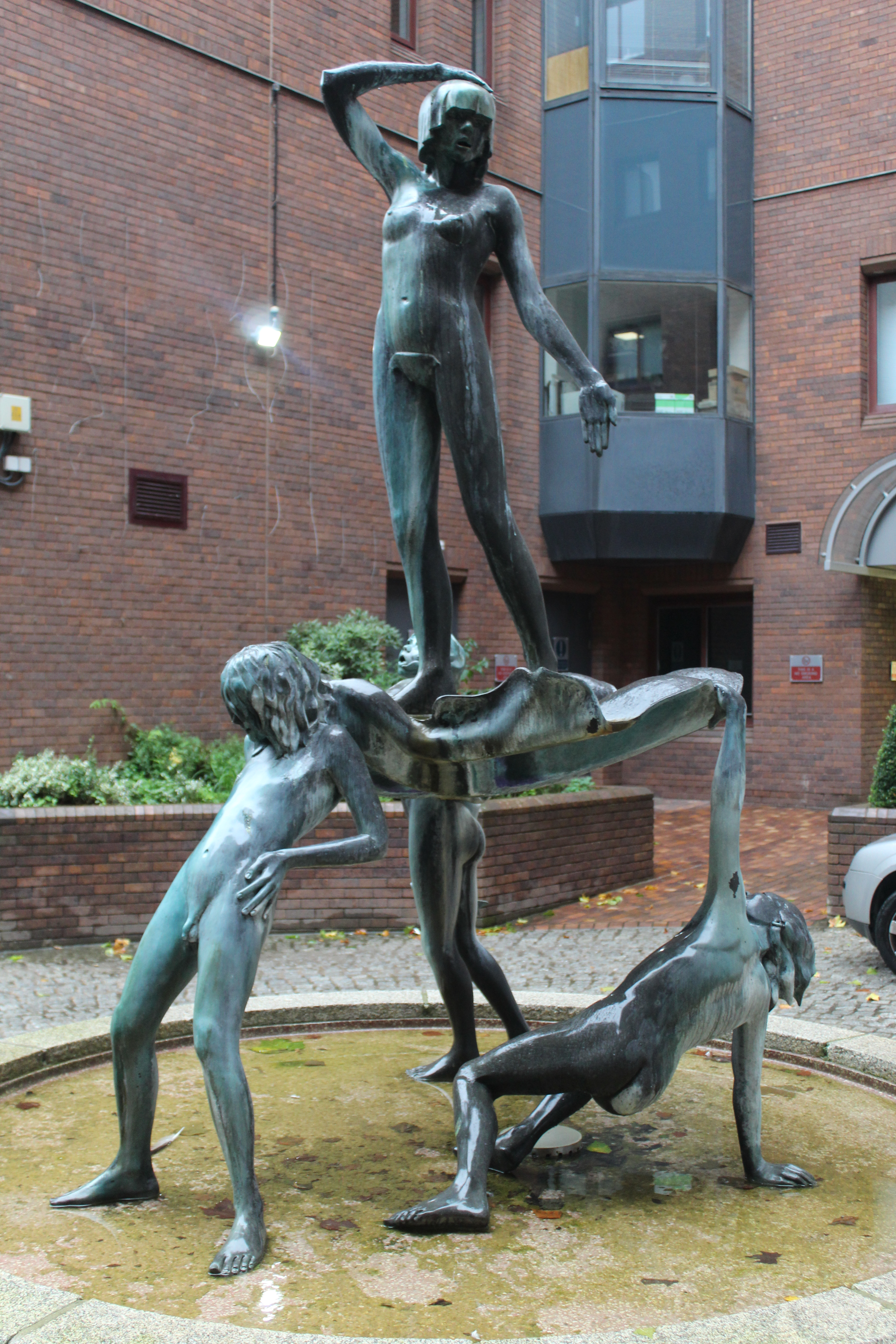
Fountain of Sabrina, Broad Quay, Bristol

- Brigitte Bardot (1962), painting and subsequent screen prints including dragsters and the Baby Baby Wild Things series (late 1960s)
- Callanish (1974), abstract steel sculpture for the campus of Strathclyde University to mimic the Callanish Stones
- The Galina series including An American Girl (1977)
- Sherlock Holmes (1991), Picardy Place, Edinburgh
- Sir Charles Fraser, Scottish National Portrait Gallery (1991)
- Axis Mundi (1995), Tanfield House, Edinburgh, Scotland
- The Spirit of Rugby – Scrum Half, Winger, Try Scorer, Kicker (1995), four statues outside of Twickenham Rugby Stadium, London
- Bank Station Dragons (1995), Bank tube station, London
- Paul Getty II, National Gallery, London, 1996
- Falcon Square (2001), Inverness, Scotland
- New Paintings for Modern Times (2004–2009): a series of work drawn from the Gulf war and modern media
- The Spirit of Rugby – Line-Out (2010), sculpture group at Twickenham Rugby Stadium, London

== Personal life ==
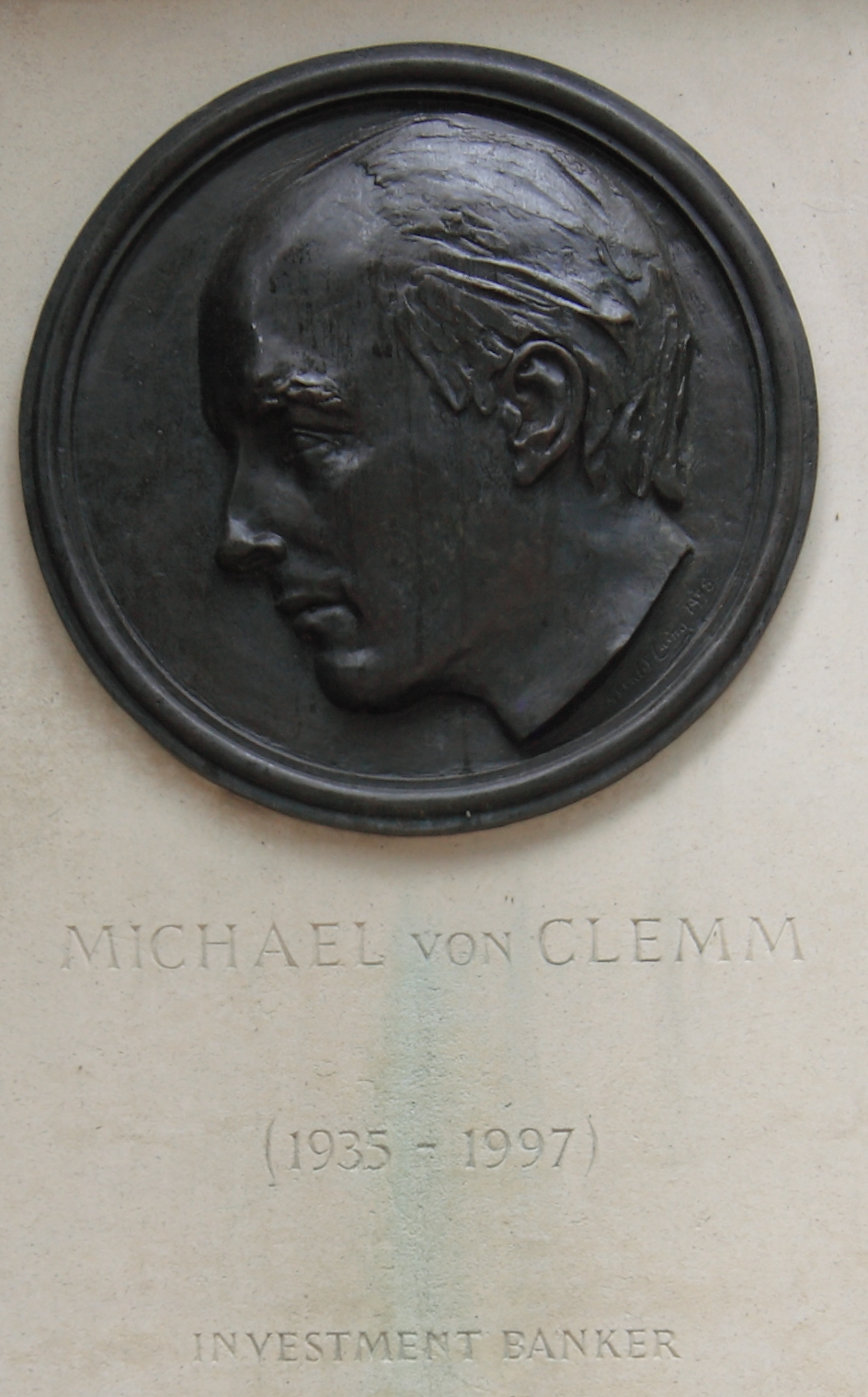
Gerald Laing: Relief Portrait of Michael von Clemm (1998). Bronze. Canary Wharf, London

Laing was married three times and was the father of six children. In 1962, he married Jennifer Anne Redway, with whom he had one daughter. They divorced in 1967 and he married Galina Vassilovna Golikova, with whom he had two sons, in 1969.

They divorced in 1983 and in 1988, Laing was married to Adaline Havemeyer Frelinghuysen at the Episcopal Church of the Heavenly Rest in New York by the Rev. C. Hugh Hildesley. Adaline, a graduate from the Madeira School, attended Sarah Lawrence College and was a daughter of former U.S. Representative Peter Frelinghuysen Jr. and the former Beatrice Sterling Procter, an heir to the Procter & Gamble fortune. Adaline, with whom he had two more sons, is the sister of Rodney Frelinghuysen, also a former U.S. Representative, and a granddaughter of the prominent New Jersey lawyer and banker Peter Hood Ballantine Frelinghuysen I. Laing fathered his sixth child with Alison Urquhart in 2002.

In 1968, Laing and his second wife found Kinkell Castle in the Black Isle of Ross and Cromarty, " a Z-plan stronghold that was the former seat of the clan Mackenzie, ruinous and in the hands of local farmer Angus MacDonald." Gerald paid £5,000 for it and spent the remainder of his life nurturing it into a family home, studio and workshop.

Laing died on 23 November 2011 at his home, Kinkell Castle. His son Farquhar (b. 1970), the elder son from Gerald's second marriage, is the founder and director of the Black Isle Bronze foundry, "one of Europe's foremost bronze caster" and another son, Sam Ogilvie, owns Ogilvie Design Studio, which designs bespoke sculptural furniture and does commercial interior design work.

== External sources ==
- Gerald Laing's website
- 25 artworks by or after Gerald Laing at the Art UK site
- Gerald Ogilvie-Laing (1936–2011), Sculptor at the National Portrait Gallery, London
