= Theodore Frelinghuysen (New York socialite) =

American clubman and socialite

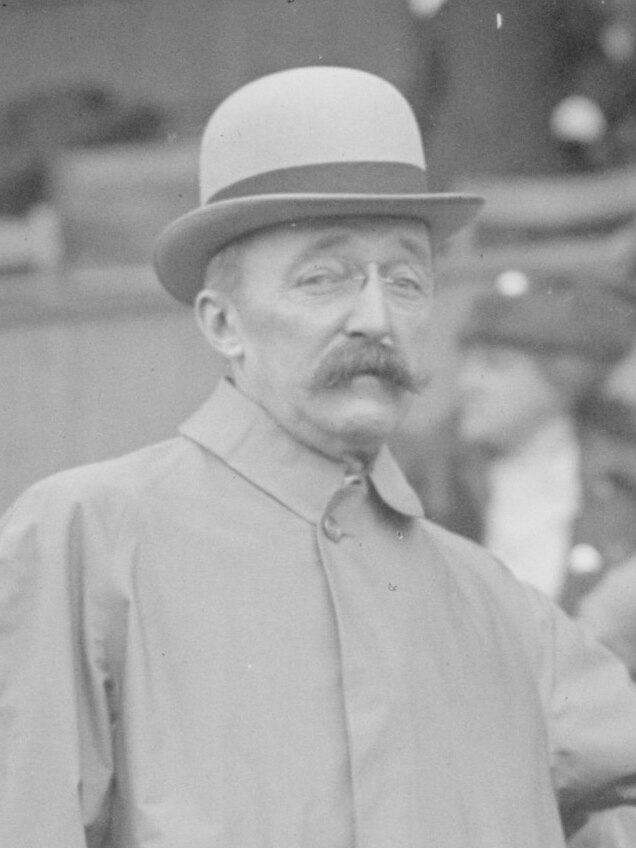
- Frelinghuysen c. 1915
- Born: April 17, 1860; Newark, New Jersey, U.S.
- Died: January 30, 1928 (aged 67); New York City, U.S.
- Resting place: St. Mary's-in-Tuxedo Episcopal Church Cemetery, Tuxedo Park, New York, U.S.
- Spouses: Alice Dudley Coats (m. 1885; died 1889) Elizabeth Mary Thompson (m. 1898)
- Children: 2
- Parent(s): Frederick Theodore Frelinghuysen; Matilda Elizabeth Griswold
- Relatives: Frederick Frelinghuysen (brother); George Frelinghuysen (brother)

Theodore Frelinghuysen (April 17, 1860 – January 30, 1928) was an American clubman and member of the Frelinghuysen family who was prominent in New York Society during the Gilded Age.

== Early life and education ==
Frelinghuysen was born in Newark, New Jersey, on April 17, 1860. He was the youngest of six children born to Frederick Theodore Frelinghuysen (1817–1885) and Matilda Elizabeth Griswold (1817–1889). His father was a lawyer who served as a U.S. Senator and later as Secretary of State under President Chester A. Arthur. His siblings included: Matilda Griswold Frelinghuysen, who married Henry Winthrop Gray, a prominent merchant; Charlotte Louisa Frelinghuysen; Frederick Frelinghuysen, who married Estelle B. Kinney; (Note: Through his brother Frederick, he was the uncle of George Griswold Frelinghuysen II, who married Anne de Smolianinof; Estelle C. "Suzy" Frelinghuysen, who married fellow painter George Lovett Kingsland Morris; Frederick Frelinghuysen; Thomas Frelinghuysen; and Theodore Frelinghuysen.) George Griswold Frelinghuysen, who married Sara Linen Ballantine, granddaughter of Peter Ballantine; and Sarah Helen Frelinghuysen (1856–1939), who married Judge John Davis, and after his death, Brig. Gen. Charles Laurie McCawley. (Note: Through his sister Sarah and niece Mathilda Elizabeth Frelinghuysen (née Davis) Lodge (1876–1960), who married George Cabot Lodge, he was the grand-uncle of Henry Cabot Lodge Jr. (1902–1985), the diplomat and United States senator from Massachusetts, and John Davis Lodge (1903–1985), also a diplomat, U.S. Representative, and Governor of Connecticut.)

His paternal grandparents were Frederick Frelinghuysen and Mary (née Dumont) Frelinghuysen. His grandfather died when his father was just three years old, so his father was adopted by his uncle, Theodore Frelinghuysen. (Note: His grand-uncle and adopted grandfather, Theodore Frelinghuysen, was Attorney General of New Jersey from 1817 to 1829, was a U.S. Senator from New Jersey from 1829 to 1835, was the Whig candidate for Vice President of the United States on the Henry Clay ticket in the 1844 Presidential election, and was Chancellor of New York University from 1839 until 1850 and president of Rutgers College from 1850 to 1862.) Both grandfather and adopted grandfather were sons of Frederick Frelinghuysen, the eminent lawyer who was one of the framers of the first New Jersey Constitution, a soldier in the American Revolutionary War, a member of the Continental Congress, and a member of the United States Senate. His maternal grandfather George Griswold, was a merchant in New York City who "made an immense fortune in the time of the clipper trade with China."

== Career ==
Frelinghuysen was the Treasurer of the J. & P. Coats Ltd., a large British thread company that was run by his father-in-law Sir James Coats and located at 347 Broadway in New York City. Upon his marriage in 1885 to Alice Coats, his mother and father-in-law wanted him to be brought into Auchincloss Brothers as an equal partner. The American firm was run by the younger brothers of Alice's mother, John Winthrop Auchincloss and Hugh Dudley Auchincloss Sr. (the father of Hugh Auchincloss). When they said no, their refusal ended the Auchincloss relationship with the Coats firm and nearly bankrupt John.

In 1906, he became a director as well as financier of the Brunswick Refrigeration Co., a consolidation of the New Brunswick Refrigeration Company and Union Refrigeration Company which had merged. The other directors included W. Campbell Clark, head of Clark Thread Company and A. M. Coats, president of the Coats Thread Company. Frelinghuysen retired from business in 1910.

=== Society life ===
In 1892, Frelinghuysen was included in Ward McAllister's "Four Hundred", purported to be an index of New York's best families, published in The New York Times. Conveniently, 400 was the number of people that could fit into Mrs. Astor's ballroom.

Frelinghuysen was a member of the Metropolitan Club, the Knickerbocker Club, the Union Club of the City of New York, the Harvard Club of New York, the Merchants' Club, the Country Club, the Lawyers' Club and the Suburban Riding and Driving Club. He was also a philanthropist who donated to the Floating Hospital and Seaside Hospital Fund in 1897.

== Personal life ==
On August 25, 1885, Frelinghuysen was married to Alice Dudley Coats (1861–1889) in Newport, Rhode Island. Alice was the daughter of Sir James Coats, 1st Baronet and Lady Sarah Auchincloss, an American. The wedding was attended by former President Chester Arthur. Her brothers included Sir Stuart Coats, 2nd Baronet, and Alfred Mainwaring Coats (1869–1942), who married Elizabeth Barnewall (1867–1940) (niece of Louisa Barnewall Van Rensselaer). They lived at 25 West 15th Street near Stuyvesant Square. Together, Theodore and Alice were the parents of:

- Frederick Theodore Frelinghuysen (1886–1967), who married Mai Duncan Watson (1896–1958) in 1914. After their divorce, he married Katherine (née Kendall) Fisk (1883–1962), the widow of Charles W. Fisk, in 1927.
- James Coats Frelinghuysen (1888–1890), who died young.

After Alice's death in 1889, he married Elizabeth Mary "Lily" (née Thompson) Cannon (1871–1967), the widow of Henry Le Grand Cannon, on June 2, 1898, at Grace Episcopal Church in New York City by Bishop Henry C. Potter. At the wedding, his ushers were R. Livingston Beeckman and William Cutting Jr. and his best-man was Elisha Dyer Jr. Lily was a daughter of William G. Thompson and descendant of Elijah Brush, both Mayors of Detroit and had two children, a boy and girl, from her first marriage. After their marriage, they lived at her home, 60 Fifth Avenue and maintained a winter residence in Palm Beach, Florida, known as "Southways," (Note: Southways was designed between 1919 and 1920 by Col. Francis L. V. Hoppin of Hoppin & Koen. The home was known as the "Winter White House" after President Warren Harding stayed there as a guest.) and another house at Tuxedo Park, New York. (Note: Reportedly, Col. Francis L. V. Hoppin and Hoppin & Koen also designed Frelinghuysen's Tuxedo Park house, now known as the Charles W. Cooper House, built c. 1899.)

Frelinghuysen died of heart disease on January 30, 1928, at his residence, 66 East 55th Street in Manhattan. Previous to East 55th Street, he had been living at the Hotel Plaza in New York. His widow lived at their Palm Beach home until her death in 1967, at the age of 97, when she was referred to as "a grand dame of a bygone era."

=== Descendants ===
Through his son Frederick, he was the step-grandfather of Lilla Fisk, who married Harry Payne Bingham Jr. (Note: After their divorce in 1955, Harry Payne Bingham Jr. married Mrs. Marleigh Kramer Gerry, the former wife of Robert Livingston Gerry Jr.) and George C. Rand in 1956; and Felicia Fisk, who married Albert B. Dewey, the brother of U.S. Representative Charles S. Dewey.
