= Senator Frelinghuysen =

Senator Frelinghuysen may refer to:

- Frederick Theodore Frelinghuysen (1817–1885), U.S. Senator from New Jersey from 1871 to 1877
- Frederick Frelinghuysen (general) (1753–1804), U.S. Senator from New Jersey from 1793 to 1796
- Joseph S. Frelinghuysen Sr. (1869–1948), U.S. Senator from New Jersey from 1917 to 1923
- Theodore Frelinghuysen (1787–1862), U.S. Senator from New Jersey from 1829 to 1835

== See also ==
- Frelinghuysen (disambiguation)
