= Frederick Frelinghuysen =

Frederick Frelinghuysen may refer to the following, all members of the American Frelinghuysen political family:

- Frederick Frelinghuysen (general) (1753–1804), Revolutionary-era statesman, U.S. Senator
- Frederick T. Frelinghuysen (1817–1885), U.S. Senator and Secretary of State
- Frederick Frelinghuysen (businessman) (1848–1924), president of the Mutual Benefit Life Insurance Company
