= Albert Eugene Gallatin =

American artist and art collector (1881–1952)

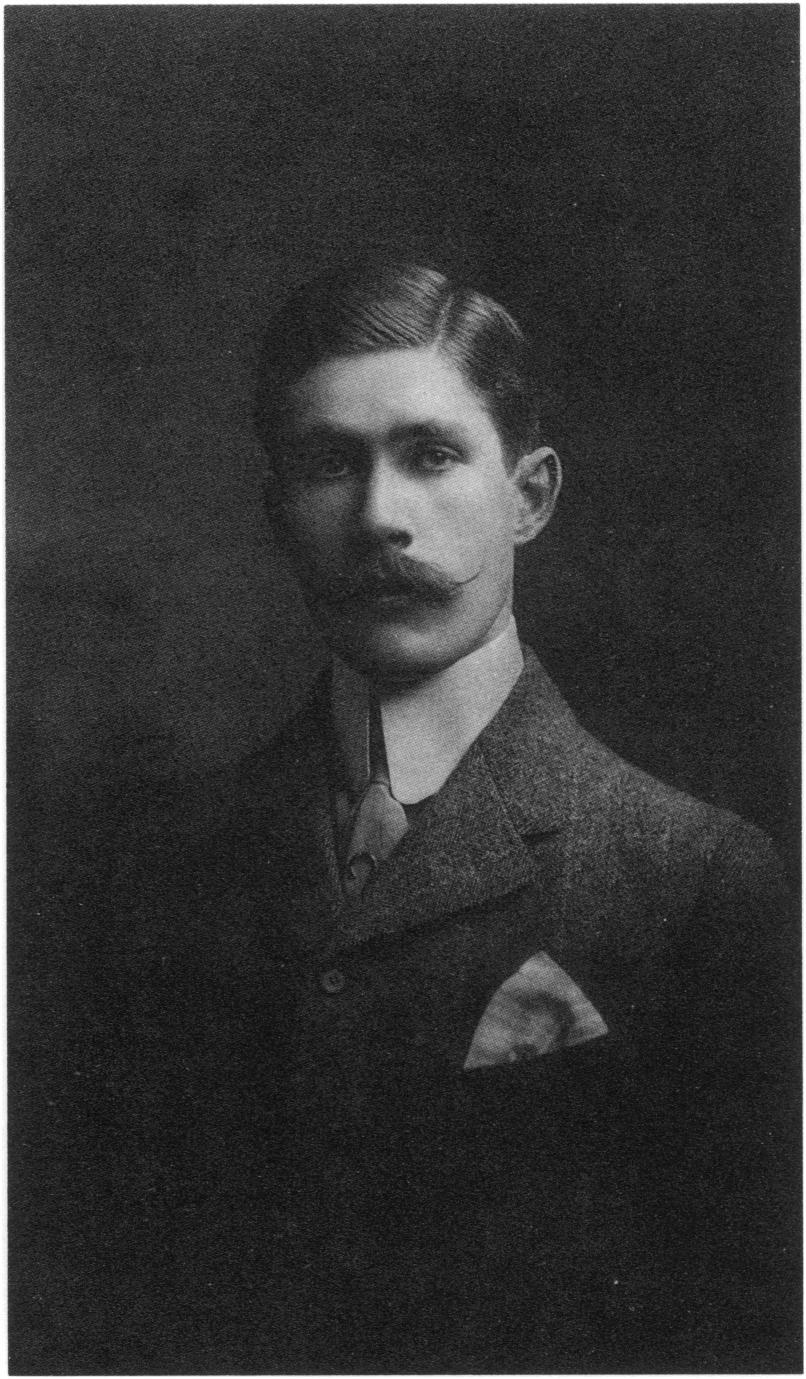
- Portrait, 1905
- Born: July 23, 1881; Villanova, Pennsylvania, United States
- Died: June 15, 1952 (aged 70)

Albert Eugene Gallatin (July 23, 1881 – June 15, 1952) was an American artist. He wrote about, collected, exhibited, and created works of art. Called "one of the great figures in early 20th-century American culture," he was a leading proponent of nonobjective and later abstract and particularly Cubist art whose "visionary approach" in both collecting and painting left "an enduring impact on the world of modern art."

== Early life and education ==
Gallatin was born in 1881 into a wealthy and socially prominent family. Showing a youthful interest in art and literature, he began to collect works by Max Beerbohm, Aubrey Beardsley, and James McNeill Whistler while still in his teens. The common element in these purchases was a preference for works that he saw as possessing a harmonious, refined, and decorative nature, rather than a naturalistic or literal one. He appreciated their aesthetic over their narrative content and their intrinsic over their didactic or utilitarian value.

As he collected art, he also began to write about it. For the two decades following the turn of the century, Gallatin produced a constant stream of articles, small monographs, and books of engraved plates. Between 1900 and 1910 most of these concerned Beardsley and Whistler. In examining their drawings and paintings he sought to find out what gave these works enduring value as opposed to superficial and temporary popularity. To him, their excellence showed in elegance of line and quality of design. He also drew attention to what he called a "decorative feeling" in works by these two artists in contrast to what he considered to be the less aesthetic realism of Degas and Millet. He maintained that modern art did not become popular because it was good, but because it scandalized. For example, in 1902 he wrote that Beardsley's drawings attracted notice by their shocking distortion of perspective and proportion and their escape from artistic conventions. Because their true value was not readily apparent, he believed that only connoisseurs along with Beardsley's fellow artists could fully appreciate them. In another article, he called Whistler an artist "whose work must remain more or less incomprehensible to the general public." He also wrote that the best art was created solely for its own sake. He wrote of Whistler's "unflinching devotion to beauty" and freedom from "commercialism, vulgarity, and the spirit of gain." Gallatin said Whistler's subjects were never ugly or lacking taste. In his view, Whistler was not a realist because he never descended to the obvious or commonplace.

When his father died in 1902, Gallatin became head of a family consisting of himself, two sisters, and their mother. As a member of New York's social elite he gave and attended high-profile dinners, dances, weddings, and benefits. His name appeared frequently in the press as a result of these activities and also as a result of his pioneering affection for automobiles and motorsport. His inheritance made it unnecessary for him to work for a living and he chose not to follow the lead of other members of his class by engaging in banking, stock brokerage, or other professional occupation. Instead, he continued to collect art and to enhance his reputation as an art connoisseur by his writings.

During the years leading up to the First World War he became increasingly interested in American artists such as illustrator Otho Cushing, pleinair painter Frederick Frieseke, and painter of interiors Walter Gay. He also acquired and wrote about artists associated with the Ashcan School—Everett Shinn, William Glackens, Ernest Lawson, and John Sloan as well as other young American artists, including John Marin and Boardman Robinson. While the drawings, paintings, and prints of these artists appear to have little in common with the work of Beardsley and Whistler, he saw in them a similar feeling for form, elegance of line, and "entire freedom from all taint of the academic." Glackens, he wrote, was like Whistler in his originality, his great color sense, and his ability to bring subjects to life. Shinn's paintings revealed to him a "personal expression of the artist's genius" and he also saw in them a "decorative instinct" that he admired in virtually all the art he collected. He was pessimistic about the capacity of museums and government agencies to support young American artists and believed they would be best served by individual art lovers, collectors, and "enlightened" critics.

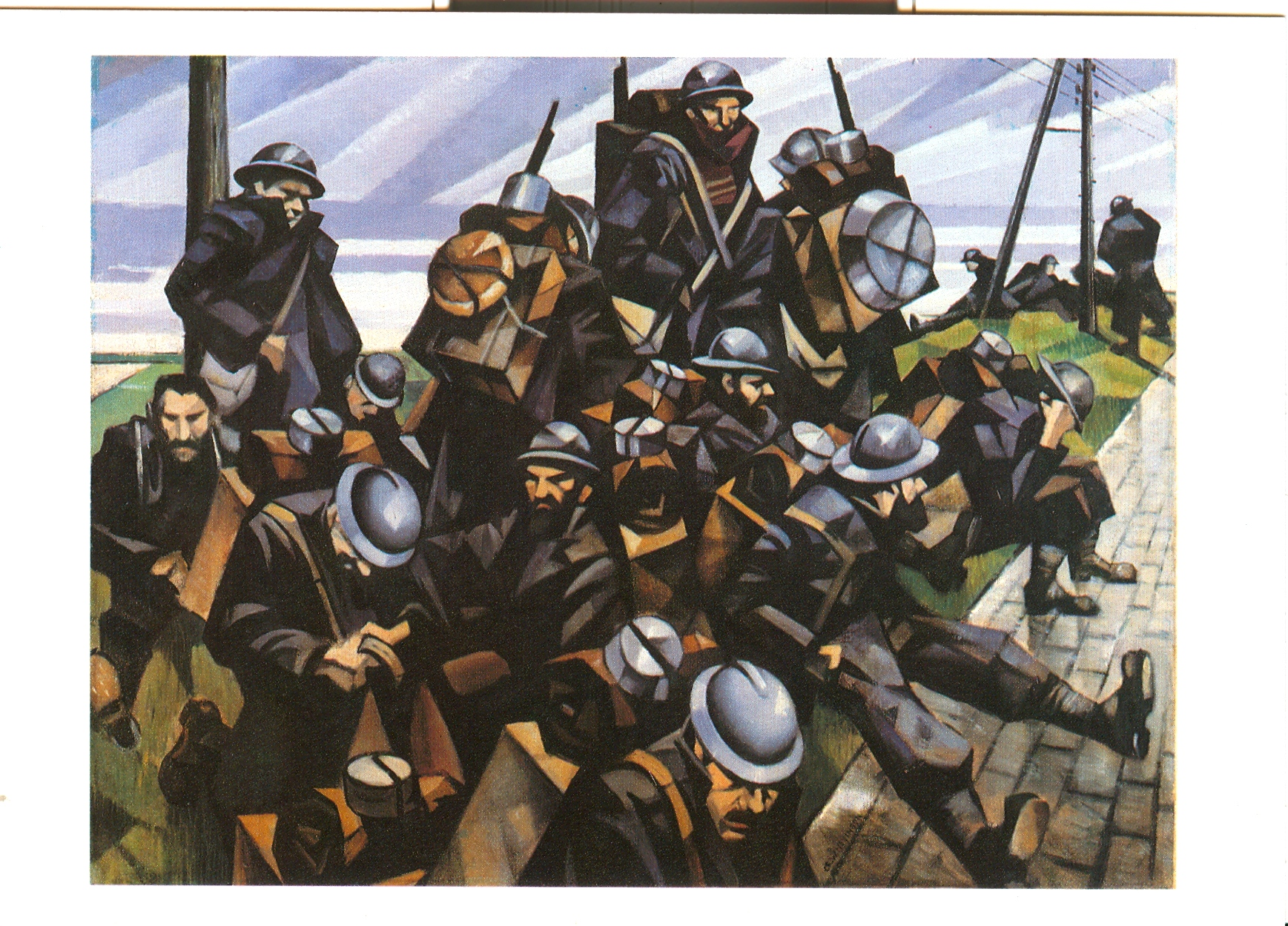
C. R. W. Nevinson, French Troops Resting, postcard taken from a painting of the same name, 1916

Gallatin served in World War I as a member of a naval reserve unit and directed two civilian groups: a federal government committee on exhibitions of art propaganda and a municipal committee that encouraged artists to make posters supporting the war effort. This involvement led to a book, Art and the Great War, (1919) in which Gallatin discussed war-related art in the allied nations, giving many examples of paintings, drawings, posters, caricatures, and prints that he admired. In 1918, with Duncan Phillips and Augustus Vincent Tack, he organized an exhibition, the Allied War Salon of New York. The works in this show were almost all traditionally representational. The exceptions were paintings by a British artist, C.R.W. Nevinson, whose work at this time could be described as a cubist version of futurism. Nevinson's French Troops Resting of 1916, was exhibited at the Keppel & Co. galleries in 1919 and was probably included in the 1918 show. It and similar works of his are said to have been Gallatin's first introduction to this aspect of modernism.

== Art collecting: 1920s ==
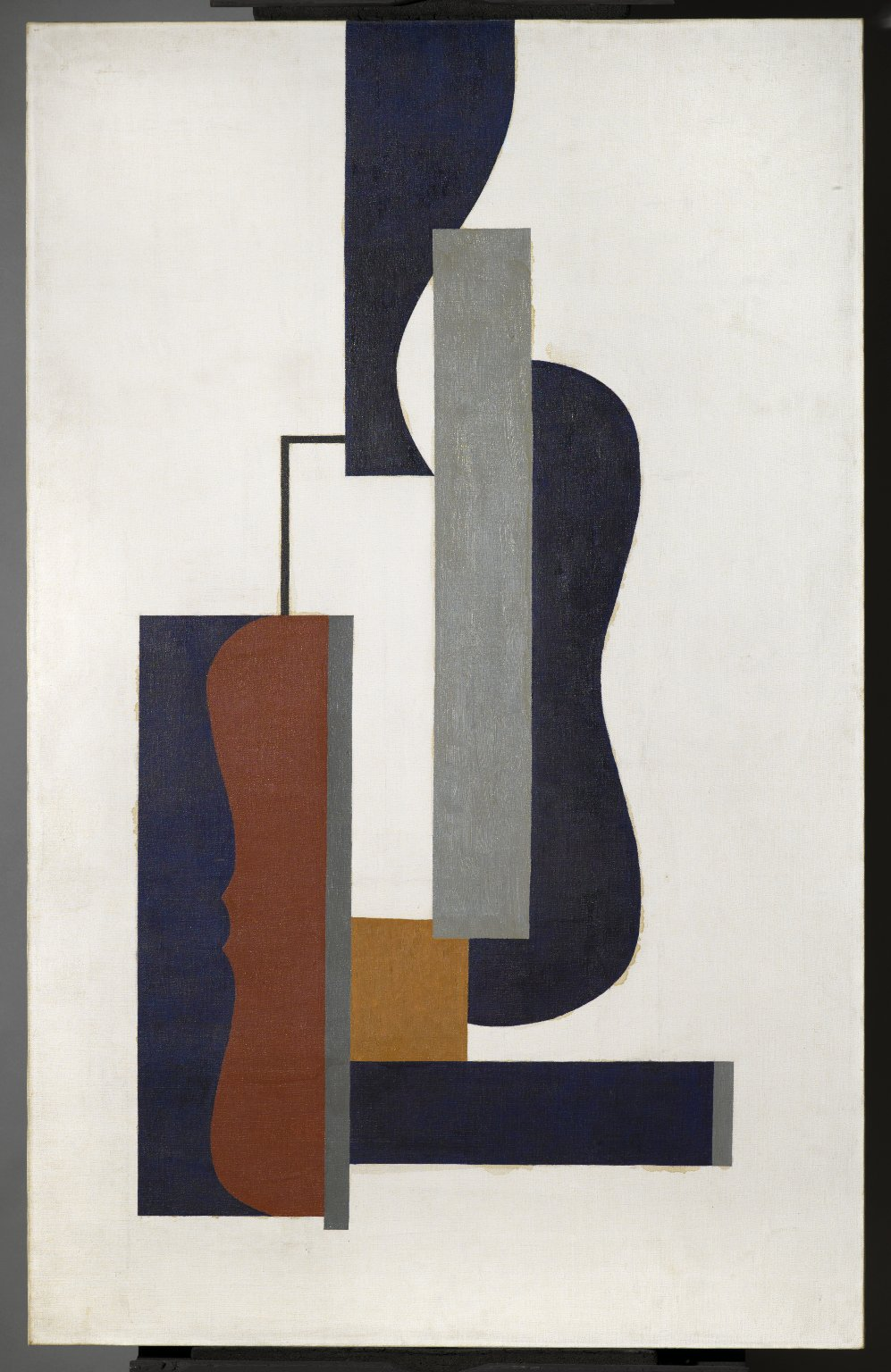
Albert Eugene Gallatin, Untitled, 1937, oil on canvas, 51 1/8 by 32 1/4 inches (1,300 mm × 820 mm), signed on back: "A.E. Gallatin / Nov. 1937"

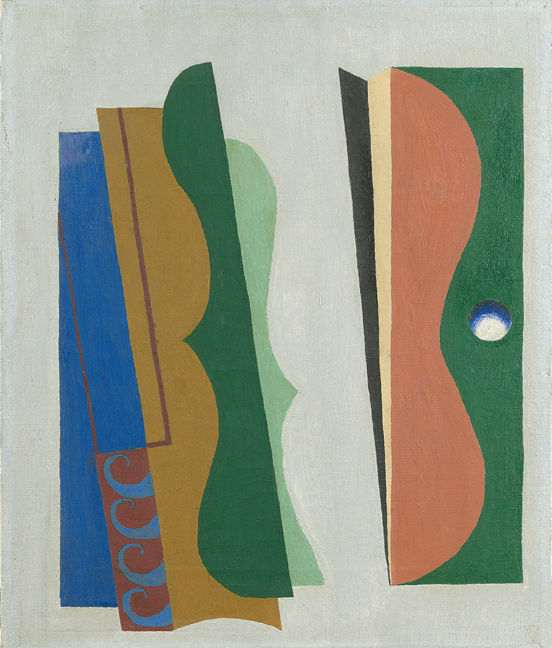
Albert Eugene Gallatin, Musical Abstraction, 1937, oil on canvas mounted on masonite, 12 by 10 inches (300 mm × 250 mm)

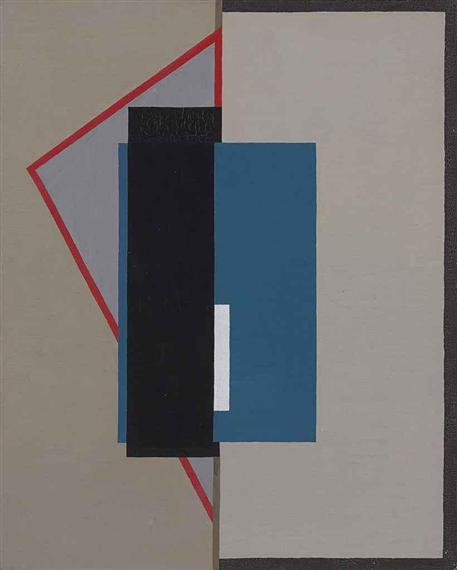
Albert Eugene Gallatin, Untitled, 1938, oil on canvas, 20 by 16 inches (510 mm × 410 mm), signed

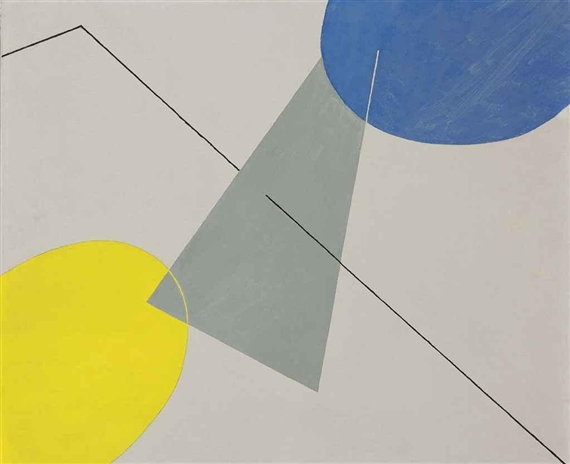
Albert Eugene Gallatin, Untitled, Untitled, 1938, oil on canvas, 20 by 24 inches (510 mm × 610 mm)

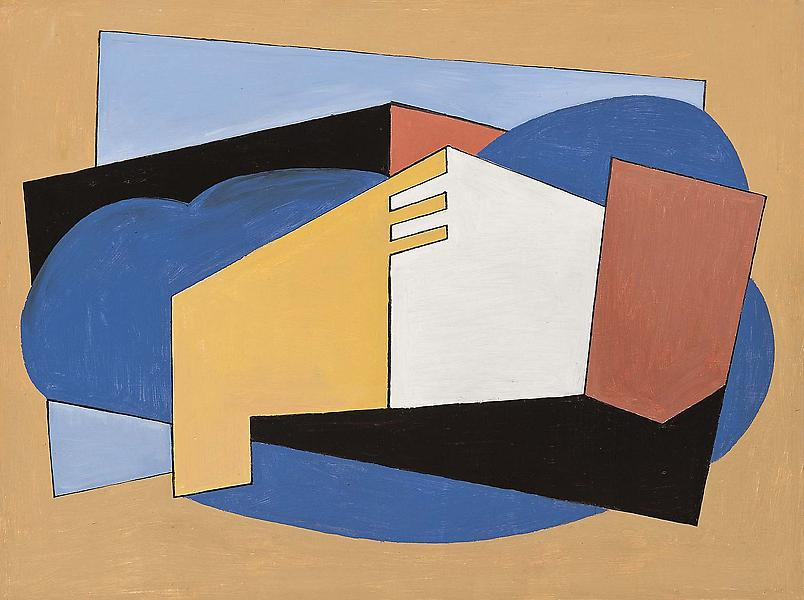
Albert Eugene Gallatin, Untitled, 1939, oil on Masonite, 15 1/8 by 20 1/4 inches (380 mm × 510 mm), signed and dated

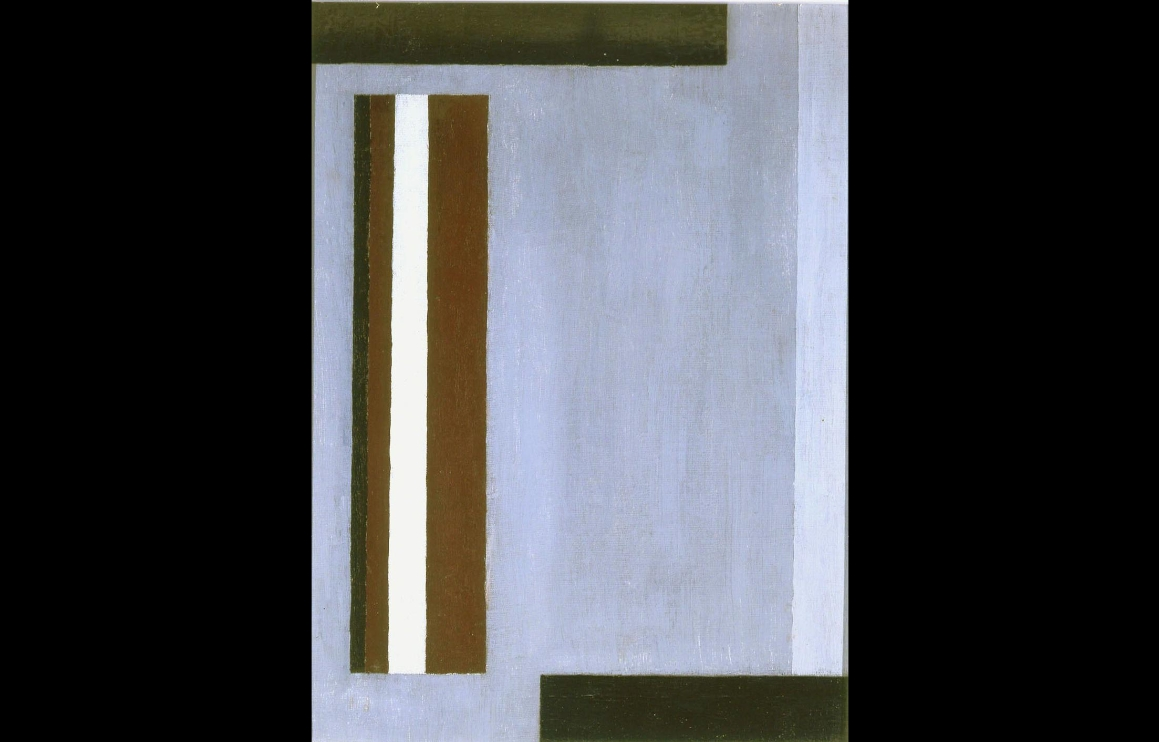
Albert Eugene Gallatin, No. 82, circa. 1940, oil on canvas board, 16 by 12 inches (410 mm × 300 mm)

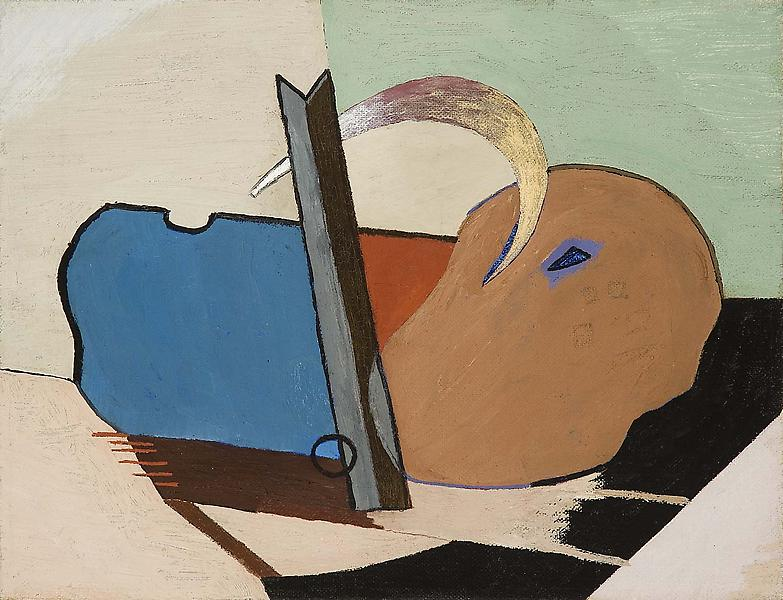
Albert Eugene Gallatin, Untitled, 1940, oil on canvas8 1/8 by 10 1/8 inches (210 mm × 260 mm), signed and dated

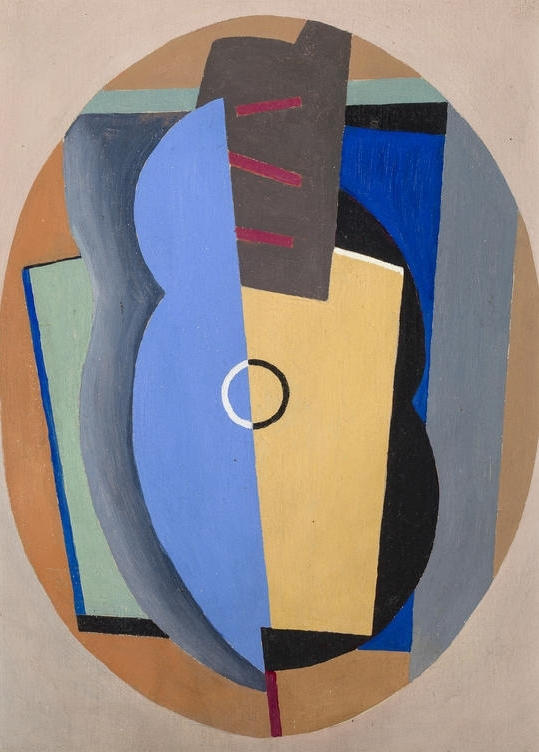
Albert Eugene Gallatin, Composition, 1941, oil on canvas, 16 by 12 inches (410 mm × 300 mm), signed on back: "A. E. Gallatin / Oct. 1941"

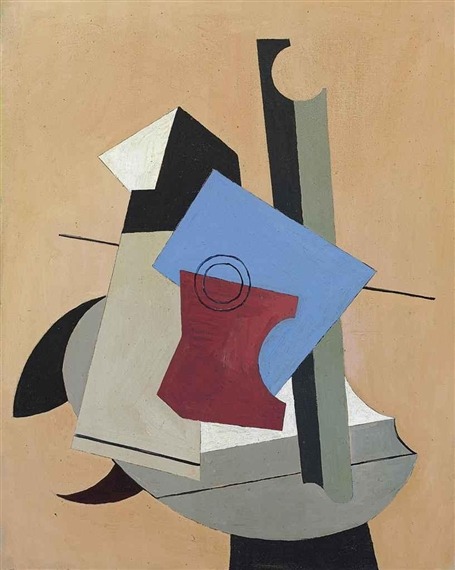
Albert Eugene Gallatin, Untitled, 1943, oil on canvas, 20 by 16 inches (510 mm × 410 mm)

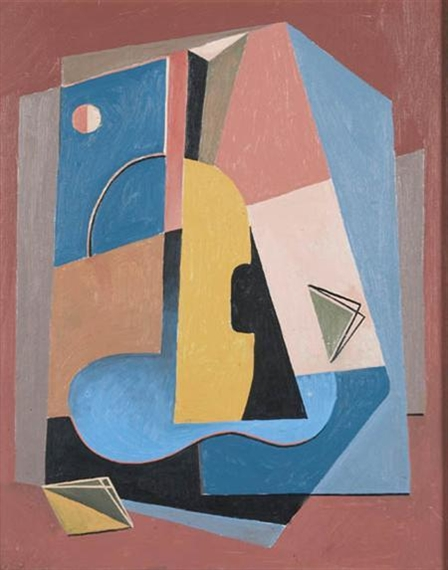
Albert Eugene Gallatin, Untitled, 1944, oil on canvas laid to masonite, 20 by 16 inches (510 mm × 410 mm)

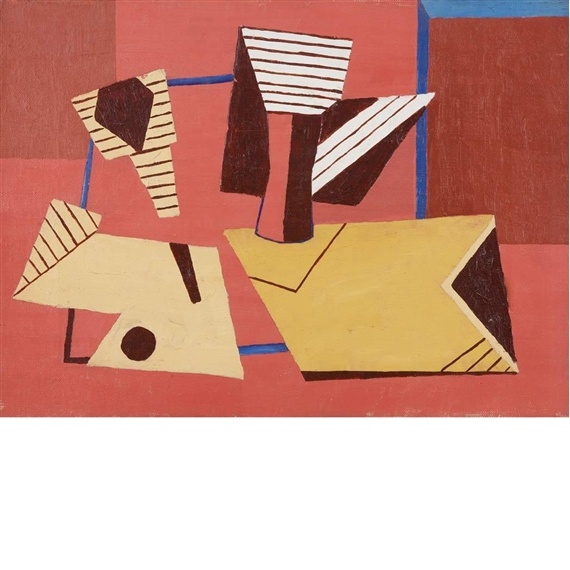
Albert Eugene Gallatin, Untitled, 1947, oil on canvas, 10 1/4 by 14 inches (260 mm × 360 mm)

In 1916, Gallatin had dismissed modernists in general and cubists in particular as immature. He thought their work to be half-baked, mediocre, and depressing. By the middle of the 1920s, through the influence of Nevinson, of the critic, Clive Bell, and of the authors of articles in The Arts magazine, he had thoroughly revised his opinions. Nevinson showed that cubism was not a gimmick, but a technique that emerged naturally from the art of its time. Bell articulated a formalist aesthetic that coincided with Gallatin's belief that art was not good because of its realism, but because the two-dimensional space of the painting, drawing, or print possessed a satisfying composition, line, shape, color, and texture. Pictorial representation, trueness to life, and the illusion of depth were secondary concerns. Bell also voiced an opinion that seems to have been latent in Gallatin's thought as well: good art is well-ordered rather than chaotic and it proceeds from the artist's thought processes and intuitive sense of rightness more than his emotions. William Zorach and other authors of articles in The Arts discussed an art of "purely abstract forms and colors" that, through an elimination "of everything not vitally necessary," produced a true art. The difficulty of judging what is a "masterpiece" and what is an "abortion" is no different for abstract than it is for representational art: it takes experience, careful study, and "listening to one's inner response."

In the years between 1920 and 1926 Gallatin became a member of the modernist Société Anonyme and was introduced to the influential artist-critic Jacques Mauny who soon became his friend and advisor. Mauny introduced him to Pablo Picasso and other painters and to the dealer and author, Daniel-Henry Kahnweiler. These men helped further to shape his growing appreciation for cubism and Mauny, in particular, helped him revamp his collection by adding paintings by artists such as Cézanne and Picasso and selling ones that no longer suited his taste. In the mid-1920s Gallatin studied art with the artist and teacher, Robert Henri, and in 1926 produced some small still lifes and mythology-themed paintings which have been described as having "broad areas of open space broken up by clusters of oddly shaped forms." His interest in cubism deepened and he added works to his collection by Georges Braque and Juan Gris.

At least partly in response to articles by Forbes Watson in The Arts and Henry McBride in The Dial, Gallatin began planning for a public gallery based on his collection of modern art. Early in 1927, as a result of a family connection with New York University, he was able first to organize a small show and, in December of that year, to open his Gallery of Living Art in the south study hall of that university's main building on Washington Square. The gallery has been called the first museum devoted exclusively to modern art. (The Phillips Memorial Collection, opened in 1920, might also lay claim to that distinction but for the fact that it was not exclusively modernist.) Consisting almost entirely of works from Gallatin's collection and assembled with help from the critic, Henry McBride, there were, at its opening, paintings and works on paper by twenty-four artists, both American and French. In addition to the forty-three of his own, Gallatin included fifteen borrowed works. There was no entry fee and from the beginning it was seen as a place for artists to use as well as the general public.

== Art collecting: 1930s ==
The composition of the Gallery of Living Art was informal and fluid, changing frequently as Gallatin added to his collection or simply wished to revise the display. Somewhat conservative at first, it grew to include major paintings in the cubist, neo-plasticist, and constructivist styles by artists such as Picasso, Braque, Gris, Fernand Léger, Piet Mondrian, Jean Hélion, and El Lissitzky as well as ones in the surrealist style by Joan Miró, Jean Arp, and André Masson. Gallatin hung the gallery with the few large paintings occupying wall space by themselves. By the mid-1930s, these large paintings included Picasso's Three Musicians (1921), Léger's The City (1919), and Miró's Painting (Fratellini). Most of the collection consisted of small works making it easy for moderately sized ones, such as Miró's Dog Barking at the Moon (1926) and Mondrian's Composition with Blue and Yellow (1932), to attract the viewer's notice. During the 1930s Gallatin continued to receive advice from Jacques Mauny. He also was aided by a succession of friends and acquaintances beginning with Henry McBride (1927–32), followed by Robert Delaunay (1932–33), and then Jean Hélion and George L.K. Morris (1933 – ca. 1940). Following his own inclination and their influence, he purged figurative works in favor of abstraction and emphasized non-objective works over ones having identifiable subjects.

In 1936 Gallatin changed the name of the gallery to Museum of Living Art. By this time both the Whitney Museum and the Museum of Modern Art had opened to the public and Gallatin's museum was credited as having the collection that most interested, and influenced, young New York artists such as Arshile Gorky, Philip Guston, Robert Motherwell, and the de Koonings.

In 1938 Life Magazine profiled Gallatin and the Museum in a photo spread entitled "Albert Gallatin's Great-Grandson Sponsors a Museum of Abstract Art." The images included a caricature of Gallatin by Léger, a photo of a set of panels in the museum, major works in the collection, and copies of photographs that Gallatin had taken of prominent Parisian artists.

On August 24, 1939, Gallatin purchased Piet Mondrian's “Composition with Blue” from art dealer Curt Valentin. He donated it to the Philadelphia Museum of Arts, against which a claim for restitution was filed in 2021 because the painting had been seized by Nazis.

== Art work: 1930s–1940s ==
In February 1936 Gallatin resumed painting. He had been deliberate and unhurried in his collecting, acquiring first small pieces on paper and, on becoming comfortable with an artist's work, gradually moving on to larger oil paintings. Similarly, he took many months to work up his own easel productions from conception to finished state. The works themselves were uniformly non-objective. At the time critics saw them as cerebral and "Euclidean." In 1938, Edward Alden Jewell, the perceptive critic for the New York Times called them "pure" and, making an early use of the term, "non-objective" (the quote marks are his). They have since been seen as "sensitively realized abstractions," structural designs of an architectural nature, imbued with "subtle structural strength," and "endlessly inventive." The term "decorative" was also applied to them, both in a pejorative sense and one more in keeping with his own use of the term, which connoted harmony and a higher plane of taste.

In 1936 paintings of his were included in a show at the Galerie Pierre, Paris. Previously exhibited in the Paul Reinhardt Galleries in New York, the show was then called "Five Contemporary American Concretionists" and lacked his work.

He was generally reticent about his work but in 1938 told an interviewer that he tried to strip his painting down to the essentials of art. The statement fits with his writings on the artists whose work he admired. He felt art was best when least connected to things in the world: pure line, color, shape, texture, and tone. In keeping with this attitude, he rarely gave his paintings distinctive names, leaving them untitled or calling them simply "Composition" or "Abstraction."

In 1937 Gallatin joined the American Abstract Artists group (to which Morris already belonged) and began to give it financial support. The group was formed by a loose assembly of artists to help educate the public about abstract art and to hold exhibitions. The following year, at the Georgette Passedoit Gallery in New York, he had his first solo exhibition and also sold a painting, Composition (1938), to the Museum of Modern Art. During the summer of that year he made his last trip abroad and thereafter enlarged his collection without traveling.

In 1939 he exhibited with two other members of American Abstract Artists—Morris and Charles G. Shaw—at the gallery of Jacques Seligmann in New York. Since all three were non-objective painters and all were wealthy New Yorkers, they came to be called the "Park Avenue Cubists."

From that time forward, non-objective art in general and Gallatin's art in particular became increasingly accepted within the New York art world. In 1941 he was said to paint with taste, fine touch, and inventive skill. In 1945 Edward Alden Jewell referred to him as an "impressive exponent of this form of abstraction" whose "work is refreshingly individual," "vigorous and expertly painted," and in 1947 he wrote that Gallatin was secure in his position as "uncompromising nonobjectivist" whose work was "all neatness and smooth reasonable decorum." In 1942 Gallatin was referred to as New York's "abstract king" in a profile that appeared in the "Talk of the Town" section of the New Yorker magazine.

== Later life and work ==
During the 1940s Gallatin continued to exhibit his own paintings and organize exhibits of others. In 1942 he put together a show devoted to American women, including Morris's wife, Suzy Frelinghuysen, as well as Alice Trumbull Mason and Esphyr Slobodkina. That same year New York University informed him that he had to close the Museum of Living Art so that the space it occupied could be repurposed as a wartime economy measure. Greatly disappointed, Gallatin accepted an offer from the Philadelphia Museum of Art to provide a home for it. Within a few months, 175 works from his collection were moved to Philadelphia and a few were donated to the Berkshire Museum in Pittsfield, Massachusetts, to which Morris and Frelinghuysen were connected. During the remainder of the 1940s until his death in 1952, he continued to paint, promote, and collect non-objective art. In 1952 he was given a one-man retrospective exhibition at the Rose Fried Gallery, New York. On his death he dispersed his remaining works of art to the New-York Historical Society, the Museum of the City of New York, the National Gallery of Art, and his two sisters. At the end of his life the style of painting that he had championed was falling out of favor as abstract-expressionist art achieved its first critical recognition. Since that time it has regained critical attention and public appeal and is seen at least by some as influencing the minimalist and hard-edge artists who came into prominence in the 1960s as well as younger artists such as Sarah Morris and Mai Braun.

== Family ==
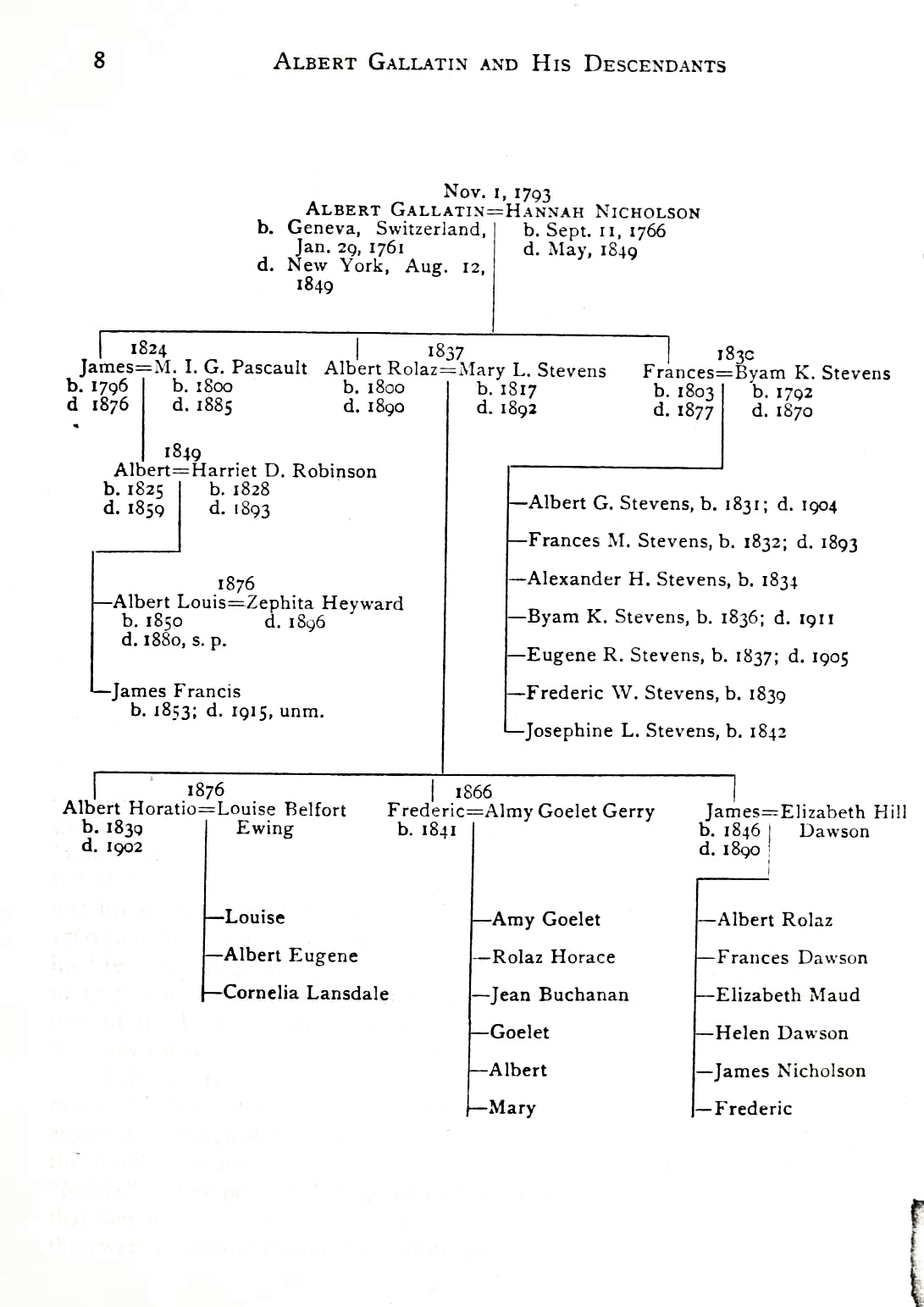
Ancestry of Albert Gallatin, born Geneva, Switzerland, January 29, 1761; died New York, August 12, 1849, and of Hannah Nicholson, born New York, September 11, 1766; died New York, May 14, 1849, with a list of their descendants to the second and third generation, compiled from Life of Albert Gallatin, by Henry Adams, 1879, History of Nicholson family, by Byam Kerby Stevens, 1911, and other sources, revised by Colonel William Plumb Bacon. Published 1916 by Press of T.A. Wright in [New York, N.Y .]

Albert was a common given name in the Gallatin family. Gallatin's great-grandfather was Albert Gallatin (1761–1849), Secretary of the Treasury under presidents Jefferson and Madison and one of the founders of New York University. His second son was named Albert Rolaz (1800–1890) and Albert Rolaz's first son, Gallatin's father, was named Albert Horatio. Gallatin had two uncles named Albert, one, surnamed Gallatin, had died before his birth, and the other, surnamed Stevens, died in 1904. Two other uncles, Frederic and James Gallatin had sons named Albert. These two cousins were sometimes confused with Gallatin. Like Gallatin, both lived in New York and both were sufficiently prominent to receive frequent mentions in the local press. Frederic's son was simply Albert (born January 8, 1880, died September 1, 1965). This Albert Gallatin formed a collection of ancient Egyptian art sold to the Metropolitan Museum of Art after his death.

Gallatin's father, Albert Horatio Gallatin, was born March 7, 1839, and died March 25, 1902. A lifelong resident of New York, he was trained in medicine at New York University, served as a surgeon in the Civil War, and became a professor of chemistry at NYU. Gallatin's mother was Louise Bedford Ewing. She was born in Maryland, August 8, 1843, died in New York, December 3, 1922. Gallatin's older sister, Louise, was born May 1880, and died February 8, 1970. She married Charles Merrick Gay, professor of architecture, University of Pennsylvania, and director of the Franklin Institute, Philadelphia, Pennsylvania. Gallatin's younger sister, Cornelia Lansdale Gallatin (February 14, 1884 – March 26, 1973), married Alfred FitzRoy Anderson (July 13, 1882 – November 15, 1965). He was a member of New York society whose charity work involved disabled veterans and repeal of Abolition.

Gallatin himself was born on July 23, 1881, in the country house of his maternal grandmother, Cornelia Lansdale Ewing, which was located in Villanova, Pennsylvania. He attended schools there and in New York, including the Cutler preparatory school and the New York Law School both in New York City. He did not take the bar exam, however, and later said "I don't know why the devil I did it. I think an abstract artist is of more value to the community than a lawyer." As he matured he mixed freely in New York society, frequenting the opera and charity balls. In 1907 he co-founded the Motor-Car Touring Society. He belonged to the Union Club, the Pilgrims Society, the Society of Colonial Wars, and was the sole American member of the French branch of the Society of the Cincinnati. After the United States entered World War I he signed up as an ensign in the Naval Coast Defense Reserve. He also chaired two committees: the Committee on Exhibitions and Pictorial Publicity of the United States Government Committee on Public Information and the Committee on Arts and Decorations of the Mayor's Committee on National Defense. The first dealt with art propaganda and led to the publication of his book, Art and the Great War (New York, E.P. Dutton & Company, 1919). The second advised artists on contributing work to the war effort. In December, 1918, Gallatin organized an Allied War Salon under the auspices of both committees. The exhibition took place at the American Art Association, Madison Square South, New York. Duncan Phillips of the American Federation of Arts and Augustus Vincent Tack of the Liberty Loan Committee were co-organizers. It included a large number of paintings, drawings, posters, and other works by the official and unofficial artists of the allied countries. Gallatin was a trustee of New York University and a patron of and donor to numerous art organizations including New York University, the Museum of Modern Art, American Abstract Artists, Museum of the City of New York, and the Berkshire Museum.

Contemporaries said Gallatin was conservative, dandified, patrician, and sophisticated. He dressed elegantly and was tall, sober, and bespectacled. His demeanor was formal and few friends were able to see the side of his personality that was relaxed, humorous, and informal. He was hardworking and firmly dedicated to his life's work. He was said to sleep on a hard, narrow bed, that had belonged to Napoleon's brother Joseph. There was never any scandal attached to his name and he never married.

== Collections ==
The main source for this list is the website called Museum Angel.

- Art Institute Of Chicago, Chicago, Illinois
- Berkshire Museum, Pittsfield, Massachusetts
- Heckscher Museum, Huntington, New York
- High Museum Of Art, Atlanta, Georgia
- Hyde Collection, Glens Falls, NY
- Metropolitan Museum of Art, New York
- Pennsylvania Academy Of The Fine Arts School and Museum, Philadelphia, Pennsylvania
- Philadelphia Museum of Art, Philadelphia, Pennsylvania
- Philbrook Museum of Art, Tulsa, Oklahoma
- Princeton University Art Museum, Princeton, New Jersey
- University of Florida – Samuel P. Harn Museum Of Art, *Gainesville, Florida
- Weatherspoon Art Museum, Greensboro, North Carolina
- Whitney Museum of American Art, New York

== Writings ==
=== Articles and monographs, in chronological order ===
- 1900 List of Drawings by Aubrey Beardsley. New York, De Vinne Press, 1900 (one hundred copies)
- 1902 Aubrey Beardsley as a Designer of Book-plates. Boston, C.E. Peabody, 1902 (reprinted from Reader Magazine, December 1902)
- 1902 "Note on the Literary Element in Beardsley's Art," The Critic, Vol. 41 (Dec. 1902), pp. 561–569
- 1902 "Aubrey Beardsley; Two Recent Estimates of the Work of the Artist," a book review by A.E. Gallatin in New York Times, September 6, 1902, page BR5
- 1903 "A Note on Otho Cushing's Drawings," Brush and Pencil, Vol. 11, No. 5 (Feb., 1903), pp. 351–355
- 1903 "A Whistler Bibliography: Prepared for The New York Times Saturday Review," New York Times, Jan. 3, 1903
- 1903 Aubrey Beardsley’s Drawings: a Catalogue and a List of Criticisms. New York, Godfrey A. S. Wieners, 1903
- 1904 Whistler's Art Dieta and Other Essays. Boston, Charles E. Goodspeed, 1904
- 1904 "Whistler. The Appreciation of His Art by Messrs. T. R. Way and G. R. Dennis by A.E. Gallatin," a book review in New York Times, January 2, 1904, p. BR12
- 1905 "Some Notable Art Criticism," The Critic (vol. 47, July–December, 1905, pp 259–260
- 1907 Whistler; Notes and Footnotes and Other Memoranda. New York, The Collector and Art Critic Co., 1907
- 1910 Modern Art at Venice, and Other Notes. New York, J.M. Bowles, 1910
- 1910 "Whistler's Pastels," Art and Progress, Vol. 2, No. 1 (Nov., 1910), pp. 8–10
- 1911 "A New Etching by Zorn," Art and Progress, Vol. 2, No. 9 (Jul., 1911), p. 261
- 1911 "The Graphic Artists of the XIXth Century," Art and Progress, Vol. 2, No. 12 (Oct., 1911), pp. 352–354
- 1911 "The International Society," Art and Progress, Vol. 2, No. 11 (Sep., 1911), pp. 325–326
- 1911 "The Pastellists," Art and Progress, Vol. 2, No. 5 (Mar., 1911), pp. 142–144
- 1911 "The Sculpture of Prince Paul Troubetzkoy," Art and Progress, Vol. 2, No. 7 (May, 1911), pp. 208–209
- 1911 "The Winslow Homer Memorial Exhibition," Art and Progress, Vol. 2, No. 6 (Apr., 1911), pp. 167–169
- 1912 "Max," Art and Progress, Vol. 3, No. 4 (Feb., 1912), pp. 478–480
- 1912 "The Paintings of Frederic C. Frieseke," Art and Progress, Vol. 3, No. 12 (Oct., 1912), pp. 747–749
- 1913 Portraits and Caricatures of James McNeill Whistler: An Iconography by A. E. Gallatin. New York, John Lane Company, 1913
- 1913 Whistler's Pastels and Other Modern Profiles. New York, John Lane Company, 1913
- 1913 "An Exhibition of Women's Portraits by Modern Artists," Art and Progress, Vol. 4, No. 8 (Jun., 1913), pp. 983–988
- 1913 "Mr. Walter Gay's Interiors," Art and Progress, Vol. 4, No. 9 (Jul., 1913), pp. 1023–1027
- 1914 "Salon des Humoristes," Art and Progress, Vol. 5, No. 5 (Mar., 1914), pp. 175–177
- 1916 Notes on Some Rare Portraits of Whistler. New York, John Lane Company, 1916
- 1916 "The Sculpture of Paul Manship," The Metropolitan Museum of Art Bulletin, Vol. 11, No. 10 (Oct., 1916), pp. 218+220–222
- 1916 "William Glackens," The American Magazine of Art, Vol. 7, No. 7 (May, 1916), pp. 261–263
- 1916 Certain Contemporaries; a Set of Notes in Art Criticism. New York, John Lane Company, 1916
- 1917 Paul Manship. New York, John Lane Company, 1917
- 1917 Portraits of Albert Gallatin. Boston, privately printed, 1917
- 1918 Portraits of Whistler: A Critical Study and an Iconography. New York, John Lane Company, 1918
- 1919 Art and the Great War. New York, E. P. Dutton & Company, *1919
- 1919 "The Paintings of Max Kuehne," The International Studio, vol. 68 (Aug. *1919), p. xxvii
- 1920 Walter Gay: Paintings of French Interiors (edited with an introduction and notes on the plates, by Albert Eugene Gallatin). New York, E. P. Dutton & Company, 1920
- 1921 Modern Fine Printing in America; an Essay. New York, privately printed, 1921
- 1922 American Water-colourists. New York, E. P. Dutton & Company, 1922
- 1924 Gaston Lachaise; Sixteen Reproductions in Collotype of the Sculptor's Work. New York, Merrymount Press, E. P. Dutton & Company, 1924
- 1924 Max Kuehne. Sixteen reproductions of the artist's work; edited with a foreword by A. E. Gallatin. New York, E. P. Dutton & Company, 1924
- 1925 John Sloan, Edited with an Introduction by A. E. Gallatin. New York, E. P. Dutton & Company, 1925
- 1933 Gallery of Living Art. New York, 1933
- 1934 Gallatin Iconography. Boston, privately printed, 1934
- 1939 Recent Paintings by Gallatin, Morris, Shaw. New York, Jacques Seligmann & Co., 1939
- 1940 Museum of Living Art: A. E. Gallatin Collection. New York, New York University, 1940
- 1943 Georges Braque: Essay and Bibliography. New York, Wittenborn and Company, 1943 (as editor)
- 1952 Bibliography of the Works of Max Beerbohm. Cambridge, Harvard University Press, 1952
- 1963 Of Art: Plato to Picasso, Aphorisms and Observations. New York, Wittenborn, 1963

=== Monographs, alphabetically by title ===
- American Water-colourists. New York, E. P. Dutton & Company, 1922
- Art and the Great War. New York, E.P. Dutton & Company, 1919
- Aubrey Beardsley as a Designer of Book-plates. Boston, C.E. Peabody, 1902
- Aubrey Beardsley’s Drawings: a Catalogue and a List of Criticisms. New York, Godfrey A. S. Wieners, 1903
- Bibliography of the Works of Max Beerbohm. Cambridge, Harvard University Press, 1952
- Certain Contemporaries; a Set of Notes in Art Criticism. New York, John Lane Company, 1916
- Gallatin Iconography. Boston, privately printed, 1934
- Gallery of Living Art. New York, 1933
- Gaston Lachaise; Sixteen Reproductions in Collotype of the Sculptor's Work. New York, Merrymount Press, E.P. Dutton & Company, 1924
- Georges Braque: Essay and Bibliography. New York, Wittenborn and Company, 1943 (as editor)
- John Sloan, Edited with an Introduction by A. E. Gallatin. New York, E.P. Dutton & company, 1925
- List of Drawings by Aubrey Beardsley. New York, De Vinne Press, 1900 (one hundred copies)
- Max Kuehne. Sixteen reproductions of the artist's work; edited with a foreword by A. E. Gallatin. New York, E. P. Dutton & company, 1924
- Modern Art at Venice, and Other Notes. New York, J.M. Bowles, 1910
- Modern Fine Printing in America; an Essay. New York, privately printed, 1921
- Museum of Living Art: A. E. Gallatin Collection. New York, New York University, 1940
- Notes on Some Rare Portraits of Whistler. New York, John Lane company, 1916
- Of Art: Plato to Picasso, Aphorisms and Observations. New York, Wittenborn, 1963
- Paintings of French Interiors (edited with an introduction and notes on the plates, by Albert Eugene Gallatin). New York, E. P. Dutton and company, 1920
- Paul Manship. New York, John Lane Company, 1917
- Portraits and Caricatures of James McNeill Whistler, an Iconography. New York, John Lane Company, 1913
- Portraits of Albert Gallatin. Boston, privately printed, 1917
- Portraits of Whistler: a Critical Study and an Iconography. New York, J. Lane, 1918
- Pursuit of Happiness; the Abstract and Brief Chronicles of the Time. New York, 1950
- Recent Paintings by Gallatin, Morris, Shaw. New York, Jacques Seligmann & Co., 1939
- Whistler; Notes and Footnotes and Other Memoranda. New York, The Collector and Art Critic Co., 1907
- Whistler's Pastels and Other Modern Profiles. New York, John Lane Company, 1913
- Whistler's Art Dieta and Other Essays. Boston, Charles E. Goodspeed, 1904

=== Articles, alphabetically by title ===
- "Aubrey Beardsley; Two Recent Estimates of the Work of the Artist," a book review by A. E. Gallatin in New York Times, September 6, 1902, page BR5
- "An Exhibition of Women's Portraits by Modern Artists," Art and Progress, Vol. 4, No. 8 (Jun. 1913), pp. 983–988
- "The Graphic Artists of the XIXth Century," Art and Progress, Vol. 2, No. 12 (Oct. 1911), pp. 352–354
- "The International Society," Art and Progress, Vol. 2, No. 11 (Sept. 1911), pp. 325–326
- "Max," Art and Progress, Vol. 3, No. 4 (Feb., 1912), pp. 478–480
- "Mr. Walter Gay's Interiors," Art and Progress, Vol. 4, No. 9 (July 1913), pp. 1023–1027
- "Ernest Lawson," The International Studio, Vol. 59, (July 1916), pp. 14
- "A New Etching by Zorn," Art and Progress, Vol. 2, No. 9 (July 1911), p. 261
- "A Note on Otho Cushing's Drawings," Brush and Pencil, Vol. 11, No. 5 (Feb., 1903), pp. 351–355
- "Note on the Literary Element in Beardsley's Art," The Critic, Vol. 41 (Dec. 1902), pp. 561–569
- "The Paintings of Max Kuehne," The International Studio, vol. 68 (Aug. 1919), p. xxvii
- "The Pastellists," Art and Progress, Vol. 2, No. 5 (Mar. 1911), pp. 142–144
- "The Paintings of Frederic C. Frieseke," Art and Progress, Vol. 3, No. 12 (Oct. 1912), pp. 747–749
- "Salon des Humoristes," Art and Progress, Vol. 5, No. 5 (Mar. 1914), pp. 175–177
- "The Sculpture of Paul Manship," The Metropolitan Museum of Art Bulletin, Vol. 11, No. 10 (Oct. 1916), pp. 218, 220–222
- "The Sculpture of Prince Paul Troubetzkoy," Art and Progress, Vol. 2, No. 7 (May 1911), pp. 208–209
- "Some Notable Art Criticism," The Critic (vol. 47, July–December 1905, pp 259–260
- "Whistler. The Appreciation of His Art by Messrs. T. R. Way and G. R. Dennis by A. E. Gallatin," a book review in The New York Times, January 2, 1904, p. BR12
- "A Whistler Bibliography: Prepared for The New York Times Saturday Review," The New York Times, Jan. 3, 1903
- "Whistler's Pastels," Art and Progress, Vol. 2, No. 1 (Nov. 1910), pp. 8–10
- "William Glackens," The American Magazine of Art, Vol. 7, No. 7 (May 1916), pp. 261–263
- "The Winslow Homer Memorial Exhibition," Art and Progress, Vol. 2, No. 6 (Apr. 1911), pp. 167–169
