= George Griswold Frelinghuysen =

American lawyer (1851–1936)

- Born: May 9, 1851; Newark, New Jersey, U.S.
- Died: April 21, 1936 (aged 84); New York City, New York, U.S.
- Education: Rutgers University (1870); Columbia Law School (1872)
- Spouse: Sara Linen Ballantine (m. 1881)
- Children: Peter Hood Ballantine Frelinghuysen I Matilda Elizabeth Frelinghuysen
- Parent(s): Frederick T. Frelinghuysen; Matilda Elizabeth Griswold
- Relatives: Frederick Frelinghuysen (great-grandfather)

George Griswold Frelinghuysen (May 9, 1851 – April 21, 1936) was an American patent lawyer, and president of P. Ballantine & Sons Company, a New Jersey brewery.

== Early life ==
Frelinghuysen was born in Newark, New Jersey on May 9, 1851. He was the son of Frederick Theodore Frelinghuysen and Matilda Elizabeth Griswold. Matilda was of English descent. His father was a lawyer who served as a U.S. Senator and later as Secretary of State under President Chester A. Arthur. His siblings included: Matilda Griswold Frelinghuysen, who married Henry Winthrop Gray, a prominent merchant; Charlotte Louisa Frelinghuysen; Frederick Frelinghuysen, who married Estelle B. Kinney; (Note: Through his brother Frederick, he was the uncle of George Griswold Frelinghuysen II, who married Anne de Smolianinof; Estelle C. "Suzy" Frelinghuysen, who married fellow painter George Lovett Kingsland Morris; Frederick Frelinghuysen; Thomas Frelinghuysen; and Theodore Frelinghuysen.) Theodore Frelinghuysen, a prominent New York clubman; and Sarah Helen Frelinghuysen (1856–1939), who married Judge John Davis, and after his death, Brig. Gen. Charles Laurie McCawley. (Note: Through his sister Sarah and niece Mathilda Elizabeth Frelinghuysen (née Davis) Lodge (1876–1960), who married George Cabot Lodge, he was the grand-uncle of Henry Cabot Lodge Jr. (1902–1985), the diplomat and United States senator from Massachusetts, and John Davis Lodge (1903–1985), also a diplomat, U.S. Representative, and Governor of Connecticut.)

His paternal grandparents were Frederick Frelinghuysen and Mary (née Dumont) Frelinghuysen. His grandfather died when his father was just three years old, so his father was adopted by his uncle, Theodore Frelinghuysen. (Note: His grand-uncle and adopted grandfather, Theodore Frelinghuysen, was Attorney General of New Jersey from 1817 to 1829, was a U.S. Senator from New Jersey from 1829 to 1835, was the Whig candidate for Vice President of the United States on the Henry Clay ticket in the 1844 Presidential election, and was Chancellor of New York University from 1839 until 1850 and president of Rutgers College from 1850 to 1862.) Both grandfather and adopted grandfather were sons of Frederick Frelinghuysen, the eminent lawyer who was one of the framers of the first New Jersey Constitution, a soldier in the American Revolutionary War, a member of the Continental Congress, and a member of the United States Senate. His maternal grandfather George Griswold, was a merchant in New York City who "made an immense fortune in the time of the clipper trade with China."

== Career ==
He graduated from Rutgers College in 1870, received his Bachelor of Laws from Columbia University Law School in 1872.

Frelinghuysen was admitted to the New Jersey and New York bars, in 1872 and 1876, respectively. He became a patent lawyer, eventually working for and becoming President of Ballantine. At its peak, Ballantine was the fourth largest brewery in the United States.

== Personal life ==
On April 26, 1881, George was married to Sara Linen Ballantine (1858–1940). Sara was the granddaughter of Peter Ballantine, the New Jersey brewer; and the daughter of Peter Hood Ballantine (1831–1882). Together, George and Sara had two children:

- Peter Hood Ballantine Frelinghuysen I (1882–1959), who married Adaline Havemeyer (1884–1963), a daughter of president of the American Sugar Refining Company Henry Osborne Havemeyer, on February 7, 1907. Future president Franklin D. Roosevelt, a classmate of Peter's at Columbia Law School, was an usher at the wedding.
- Matilda Elizabeth Frelinghuysen (1887–1967), who did not marry and who lived in Whippany.

George died in New York City in 1936.

=== Legacy ===
The George Griswold Frelinghuysen Arboretum is named for him.
