= Theodorus Jacobus Frelinghuysen II =

Theodorus Frelinghuysen II (1724–1761) or Theodorus Frelinghuysen, Jr., was a theologian in Albany, New York. He was a member of the Frelinghuysen Family

== Biography ==
He was the first-born son of Theodorus Jacobus Frelinghuysen and Eva Terhune. He studied at the University of Utrecht and was ordained a minister in October 1745. His first assignment was at the Dutch Reformed Church in Albany, New York. In October 1759 Frelinghuysen sailed from New York to the Netherlands and died in 1761 at sea while returning from an attempt to raise funds for "Queen's College" (now Rutgers University. His replacement for the church arrived in Albany in October 1760.
