= Peter Frelinghuysen Jr. =

American politician and attorney (1916–2011)

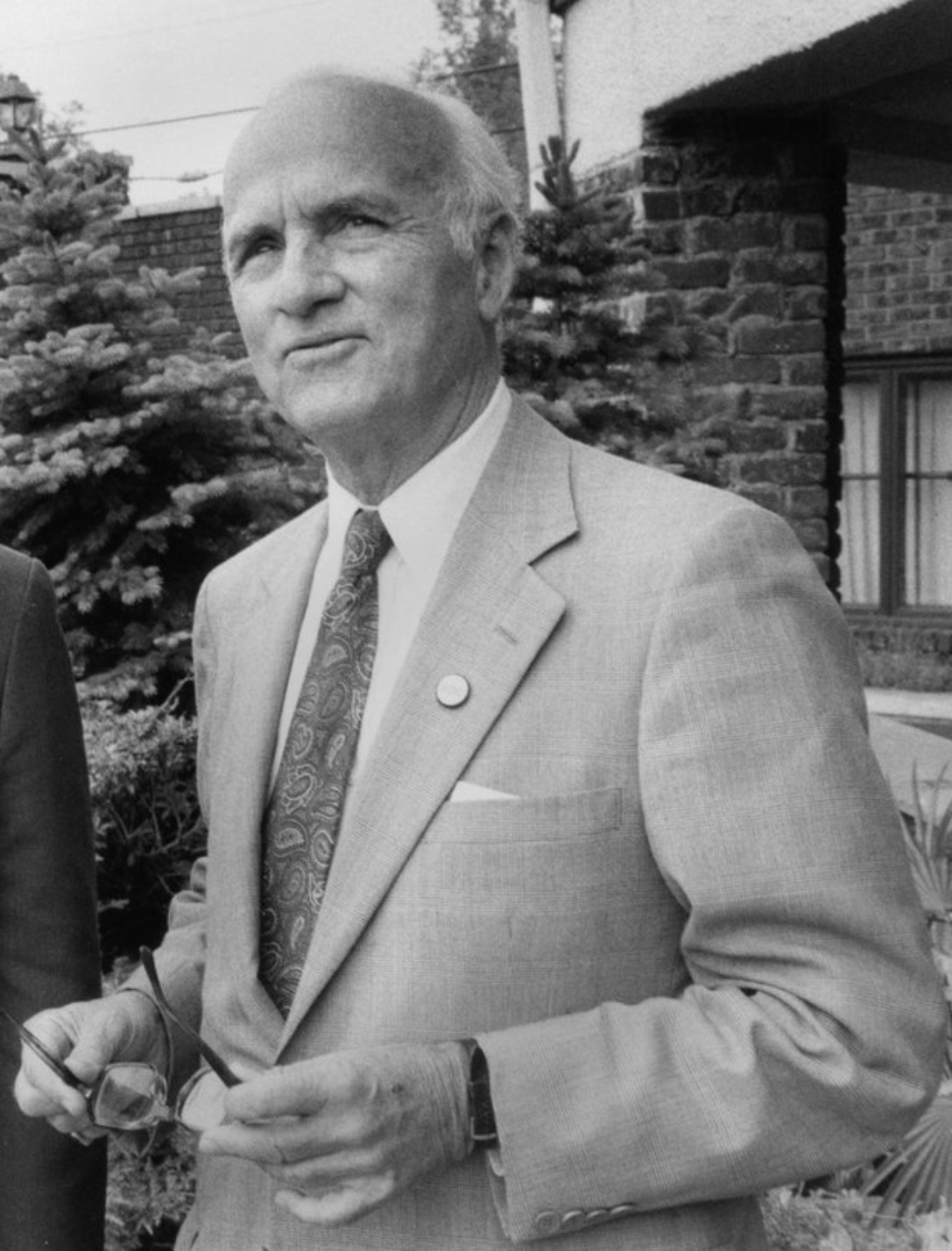
- Frelinghuysen in 1982

Member of the U.S. House of Representatives from New Jersey's 5th district
- In office January 3, 1953 – January 3, 1975
- Preceded by: Charles Aubrey Eaton
- Succeeded by: Millicent Fenwick

Personal details
- Born: Peter Hood Ballantine Frelinghuysen Jr. January 17, 1916 New York City, New York, U.S.
- Died: May 23, 2011 (aged 95) Harding Township, New Jersey, U.S.
- Party: Republican
- Spouse: Beatrice Sterling Procter (m. 1940; died 1996)
- Children: 5, including Rodney
- Parents: Peter H. B. Frelinghuysen (father); Adaline Havemeyer (mother)
- Relatives: Frelinghuysen family; Havemeyer family; Peter Ballantine (great-great-grandfather)
- Education: Princeton University (BA); Yale University (LLB)

Peter Hood Ballantine Frelinghuysen Jr. (January 17, 1916 – May 23, 2011) was an American politician and attorney. He represented New Jersey's fifth congressional district in the United States House of Representatives as a Republican from 1953 to 1975.

== Early life and education ==
Frelinghuysen was born in New York City to Peter H. B. Frelinghuysen and the former Adaline Havemeyer. Frelinghuysen's father was a banker who descended from 18th century Dutch settlers in Somerset County. (Note: Frelinghuysen Sr., a Princeton graduate, was a classmate at Columbia Law School of President Franklin D. Roosevelt, who served as an usher at his 1902 wedding to Adaline Havemeyer. Frelinghuysen Sr. devoted himself to cattle breeding in addition to banking.) His siblings included his twin brother Henry O.H. Frelinghuysen, a philanthropist and civic leader, George G. Frelinghuysen, and Frederica Frelinghuysen Emert.

He came from a long line of New Jersey politicians dating back to the early years of the United States, including four United States senators and two House members. He was the grandson of George Griswold Frelinghuysen, great-grandson of Frederick T. Frelinghuysen, the great-great-nephew of Theodore Frelinghuysen, and the great-great-great-grandson of Frederick Frelinghuysen. He was also a great-great-grandson of Ballantine Brewery founder Peter Ballantine.

Frelinghuysen attended St. Mark's School in Southborough, Massachusetts, before graduating from Princeton University in 1938 and Yale Law School in 1941.

== Career ==
After practicing law in New York City, he served in the Office of Naval Intelligence from September 1942 to December 1945 obtaining the rank of lieutenant. He then studied at Columbia University, 1946–1947. He served as staff of the Foreign Affairs Task Force of the Hoover Commission in 1948 before returning to the private sector. He served as director of Howard Savings Bank in Livingston, New Jersey. (Note: Howard Savings was founded as Howard Savings Institution in Newark in 1857. It was purchased by First Fidelity Bancorporation of Newark in 1992.)

=== U.S. Congress ===
In 1952, he was elected to the House of Representatives from New Jersey's 5th congressional district and served there until his retirement from politics in 1975. As a moderate Republican, Frelinghuysen voted in favor of the Civil Rights Acts of 1957, 1960, 1964, and 1968, as well as the 24th Amendment to the U.S. Constitution and the Voting Rights Act of 1965, but not the Johnson administration's War on Poverty programs, although he voted in favor of Medicare, a program that expanded medical assistance for the elderly.

1954 interview

In December 1959, when the Port of New York Authority's plans to develop a tract of woodlands and marsh near his estate in Morris County as an international airport serving the New York City region were exposed, Frelinghuysen participated in the opposition by the Jersey Jetport Site Association that was composed of local residents and conservationists, which raised funds to purchase almost 3,000 acres of the targeted site and donated it to the federal government, to be preserved forever as park lands. With the defeat of the airport development initiative, that parcel became the initial portion of the Great Swamp National Wildlife Refuge, established by federal statute on November 3, 1960, in the middle of the development controversy.

In January 1965, he was House Minority Leader Gerald Ford's choice for Minority Whip, but lost on a secret ballot of the Republican caucus by a vote of 70 to 59 to the incumbent Les Arends, who had held the post since 1943.

=== 1966 blackmail incident ===
In 1966, extortionists targeted Frelinghuysen for blackmail, arranging for him to have a sexual encounter with an underage male and then, posing as police officers, threatening him with public exposure. Frelinghuysen paid them $50,000. He later cooperated with the FBI's investigation of the extortionist ring, but the Justice Department notified the leadership of the House of Representatives and Frelinghuysen was forced off the Armed Services Committee.

=== Later life ===
After leaving Congress, Frelinghuysen served on the boards of several nonprofit institutions, including the Metropolitan Museum of Art and the New York Botanical Garden.

== Personal life ==
He married the former Beatrice Sterling Procter, in Stockbridge, Massachusetts, on September 7, 1940. She was a descendant of the founder of Procter & Gamble. Their children include Peter Frelinghuysen II, a lawyer, and Rodney P. Frelinghuysen, a former congressman. They lived in a 20-room Georgian Colonial home on 32 acres in Harding Township, New Jersey, designed by James W. O'Connor in 1948.

His wife died in 1996. He died on May 23, 2011, at his home in Harding Township, New Jersey.

== Notes ==
U.S. House of Representatives
Preceded by Charles Aubrey Eaton	Member of the U.S. House of Representatives from New Jersey's 5th congressional district 1953–1975	Succeeded by Millicent Fenwick
