= Frelinghuysen Arboretum =

Botanical garden in Morris Township, New Jersey, United States

Coordinates: 40.803°N 74.453°W

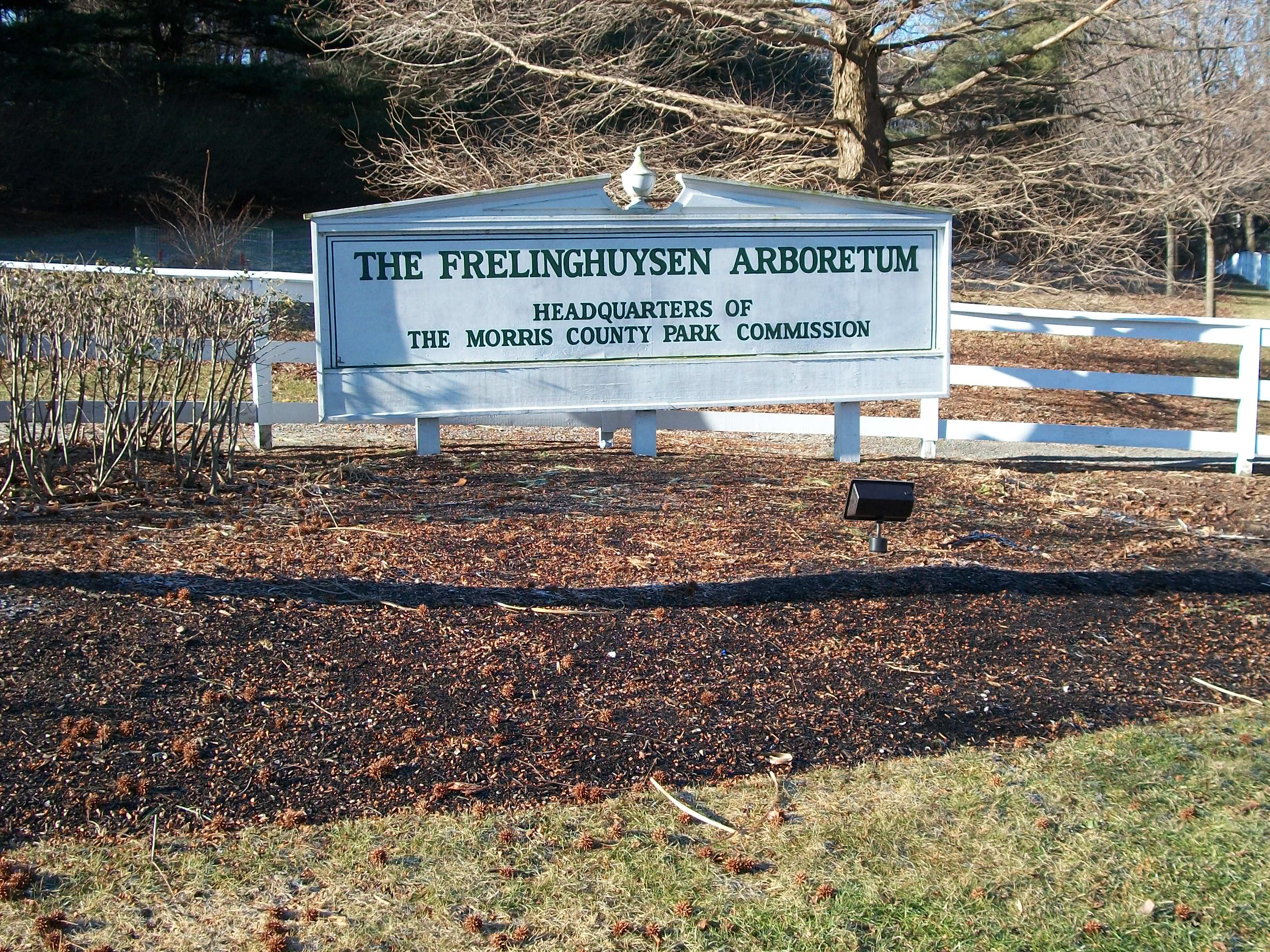
- Main entrance on East Hanover Avenue.
- Interactive map of Frelinghuysen Arboretum
- Website: Official website

The George Griswold Frelinghuysen Arboretum (127 acres) is an arboretum located at 353 East Hanover Avenue, Morris Township, New Jersey and is open daily without charge. The arboretum is also the headquarters of the Morris County Parks Commission.

The arboretum features thematic collections of plant life, including ornamental grasses, spring-blooming shrubs and perennials, summer shrubs and cutbacks, fall fruit and foliage, shade trees, and a garden called the "promising plants garden" which has underused plants supplied by nurseries, growers, and breeders. In front of the large main house there is the Great Lawn, a large gently sloping manicured grassy expanse in the style of an English county manor landscape; it is the site of outdoor concerts in the warmer months.

There are different nature and horse trails. There is a Braille Nature Trail in a small wooded hollow just off the Great Lawn which was designed for hands-on exploration. The Kathryn A. Porter "Branching Out!" Garden is worked on by children ages 5–13 during a spring after-school and summer program; the course of study includes cooking and crafts. Participants grow vegetables, herbs, and flowers to take home. The Patriots' Path is a network of hiking, biking, and equestrian trails and green open spaces, and links to other parks in New Jersey.

== History ==
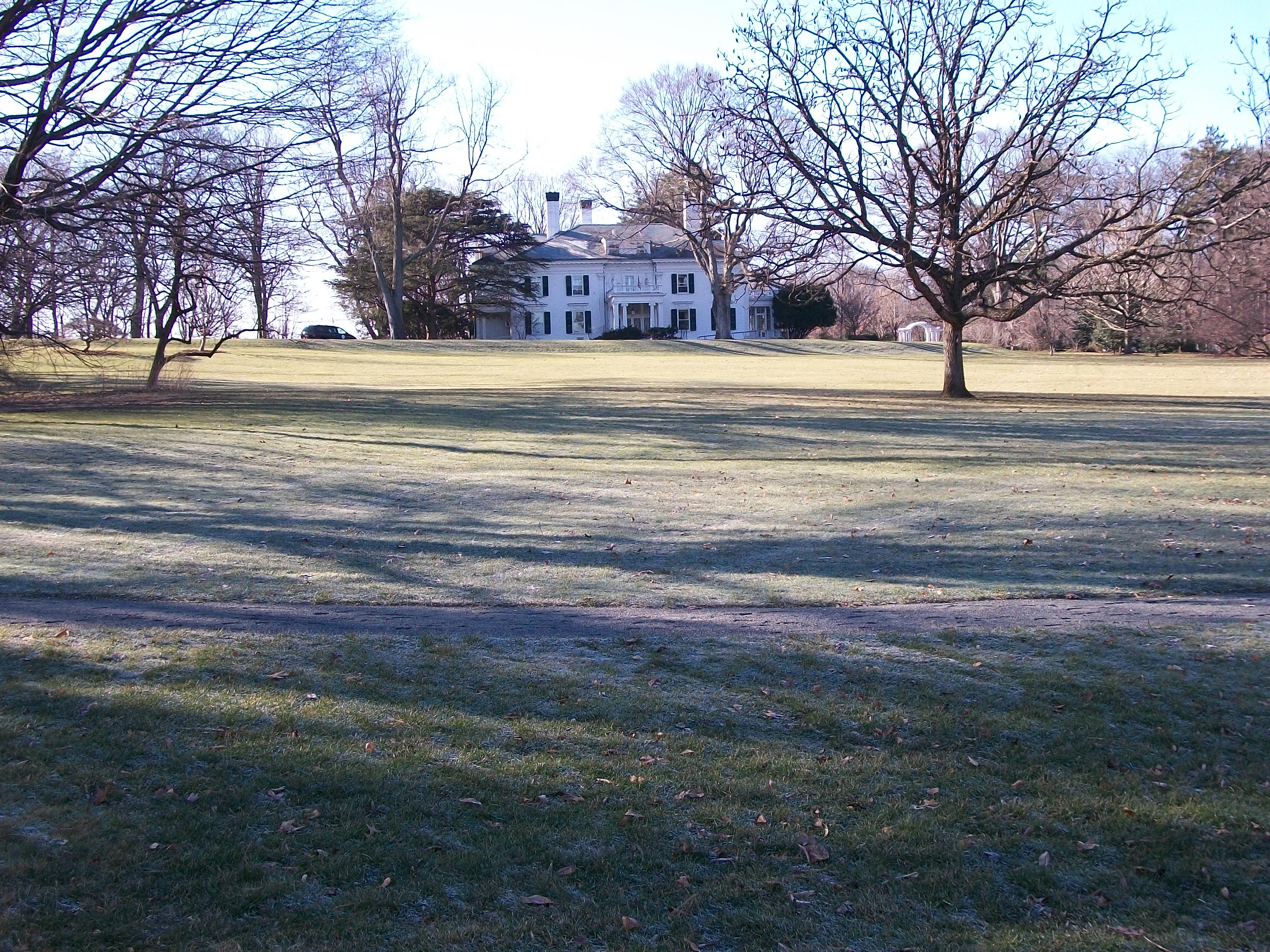
The 127-acre estate was bequeathed to Morris County by Matilda E. Frelinghuysen, who inherited the estate from her parents, in 1969.

The arboretum surrounds the Frelinghuysens' Colonial Revival mansion and its formal gardens, and features nature trails with labeled trees and shrubs. The arboretum was established on the site of Whippany Farm, owned by George Griswold Frelinghuysen (1851-1936), son of Frederick T. Frelinghuysen, and a New York City patent attorney and president of Ballantine Brewing Company from 1905 until his retirement, and Sara Ballantine (1858-1940) of Newark, New Jersey, granddaughter of the founder Peter Ballantine of the Ballantine Brewing Company.

In 1920, Mrs. Sara Ballantine planted roses, and the rose beds were laid out between the spokes of a Chippendale style brick wall set in a basket weave pattern. In 1964 their daughter, Matilda Frelinghuysen (1887-1969) began plans to turn the estate into an arboretum. Today's Frelinghuysen Arboretum was dedicated in 1971.

Rose garden behind the main house

== Gallery ==
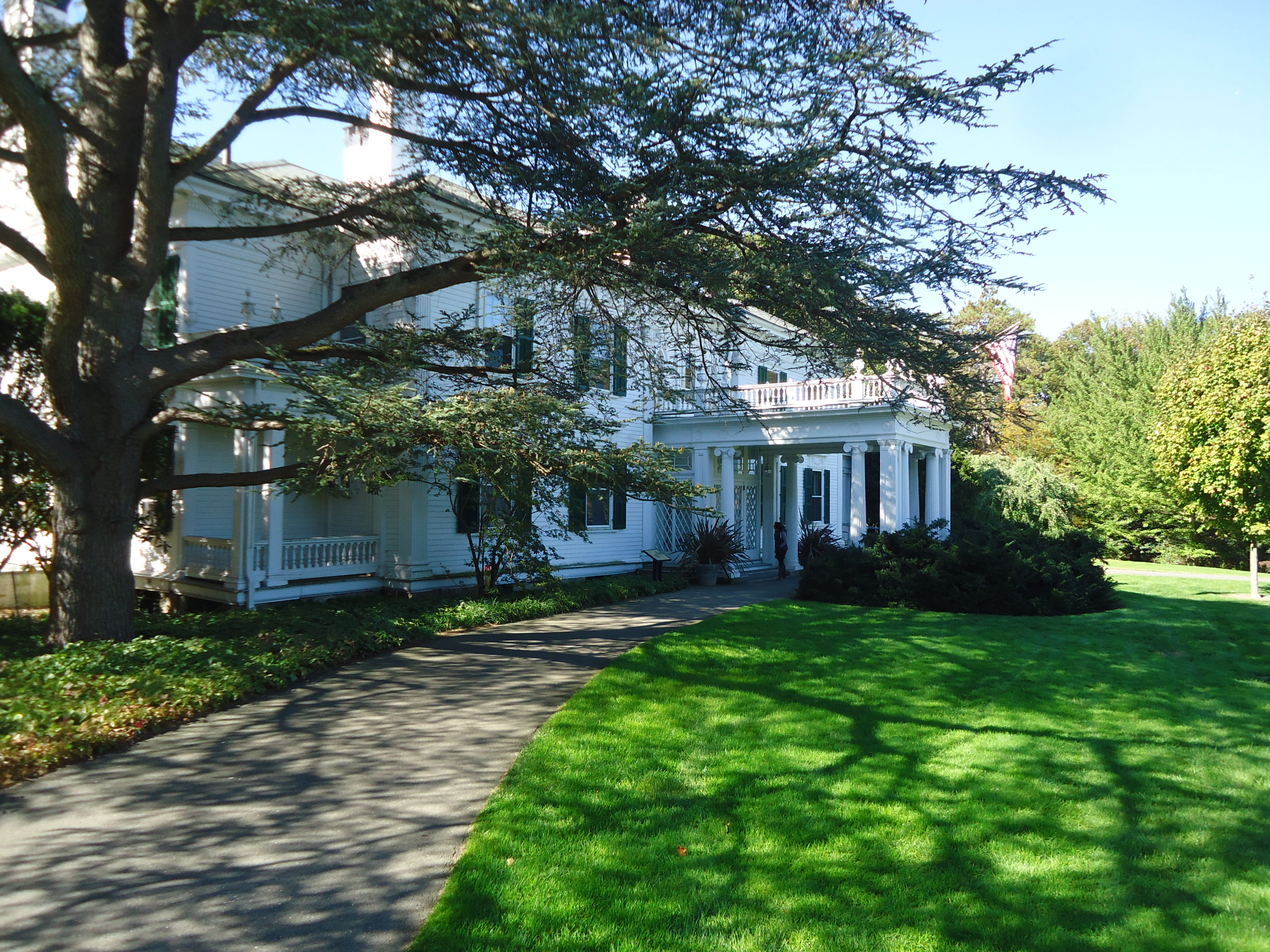
The main house serves as headquarters for the Morris County Park Commission.

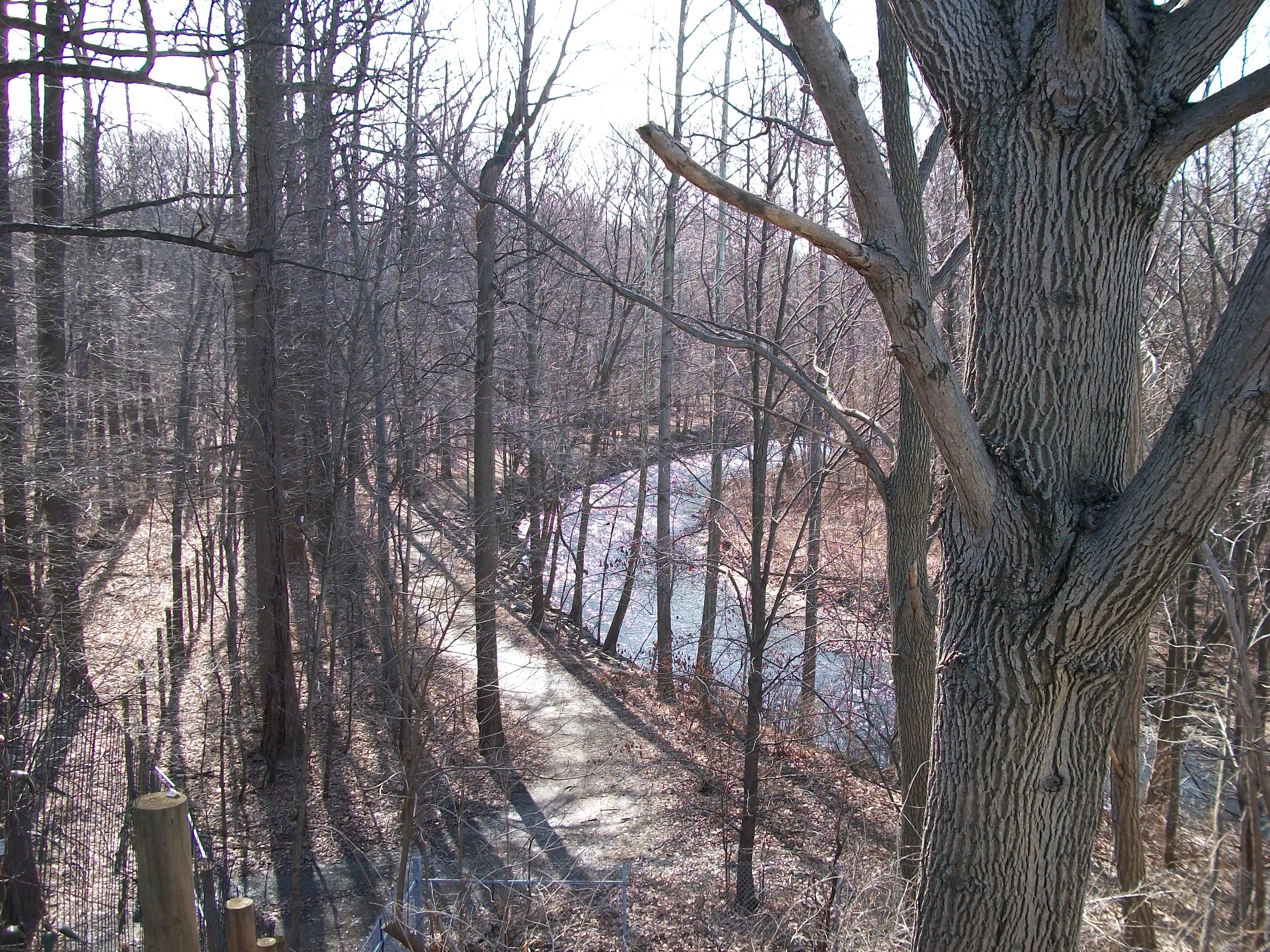
Along the west side of the property, there's a fairly steep cliff, with horse trails, which drops down to this stream.

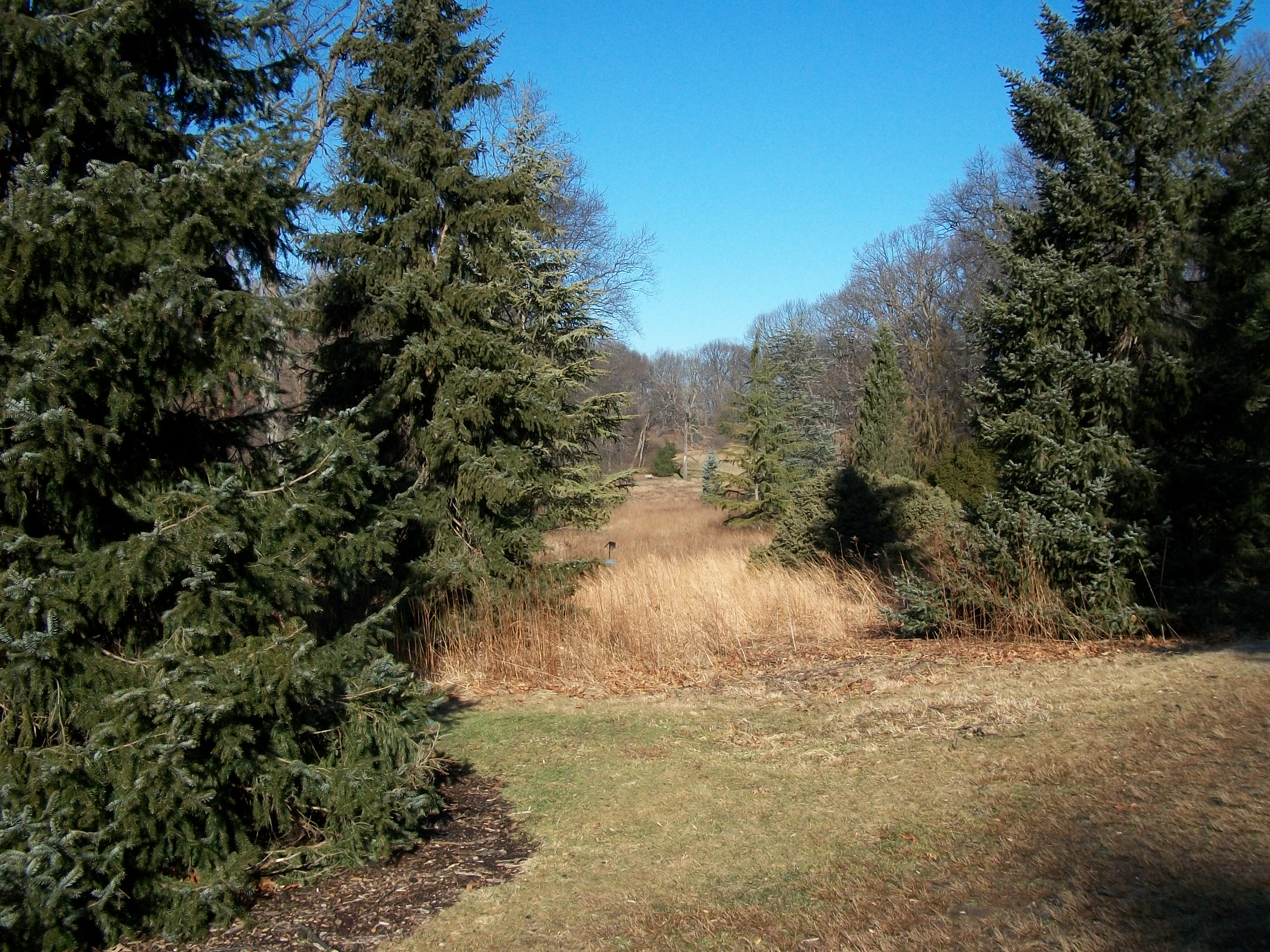
Evergreen conifers abound on the spacious property.

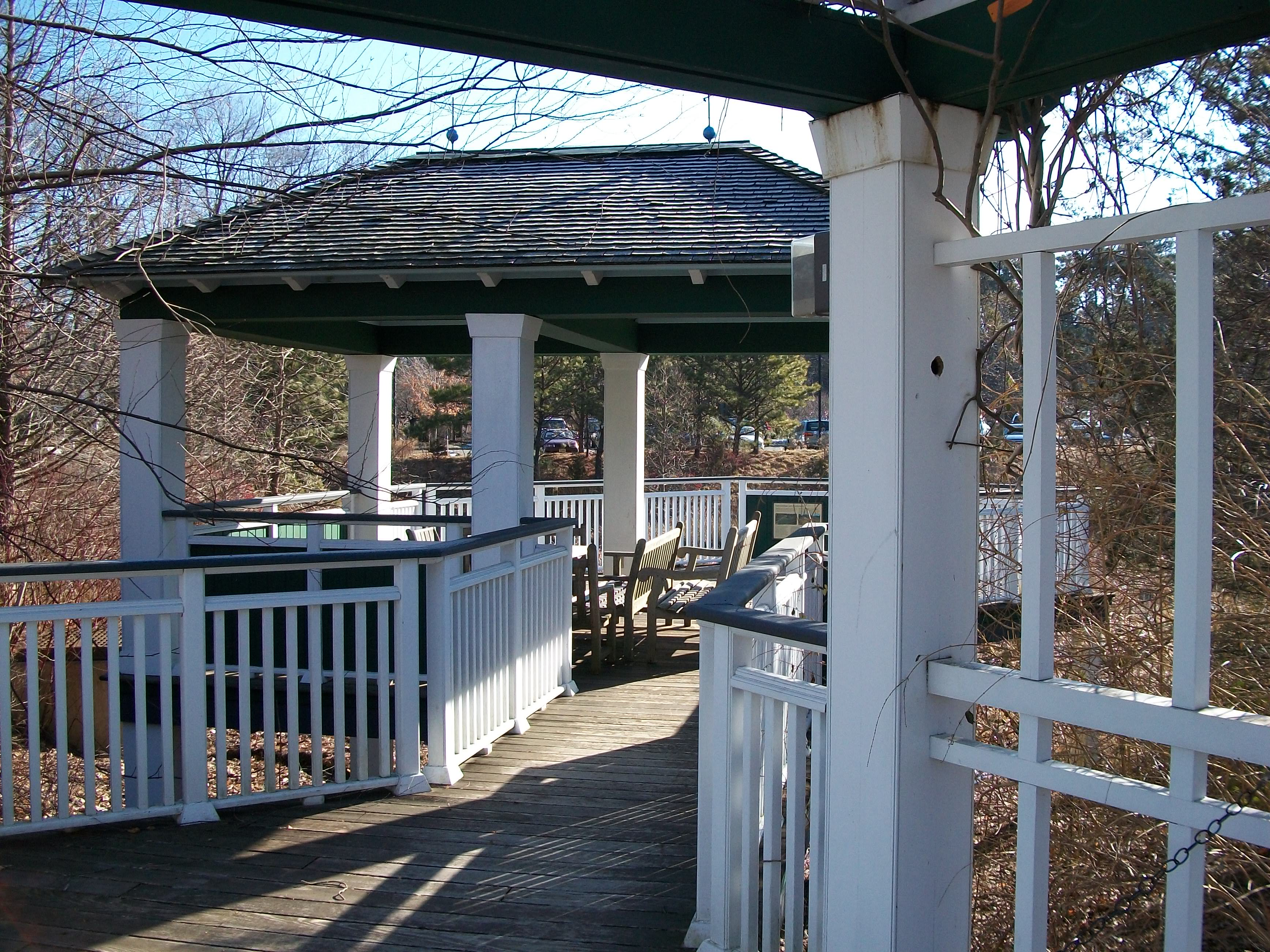
In summer, this gazebo juts out over a small pond.

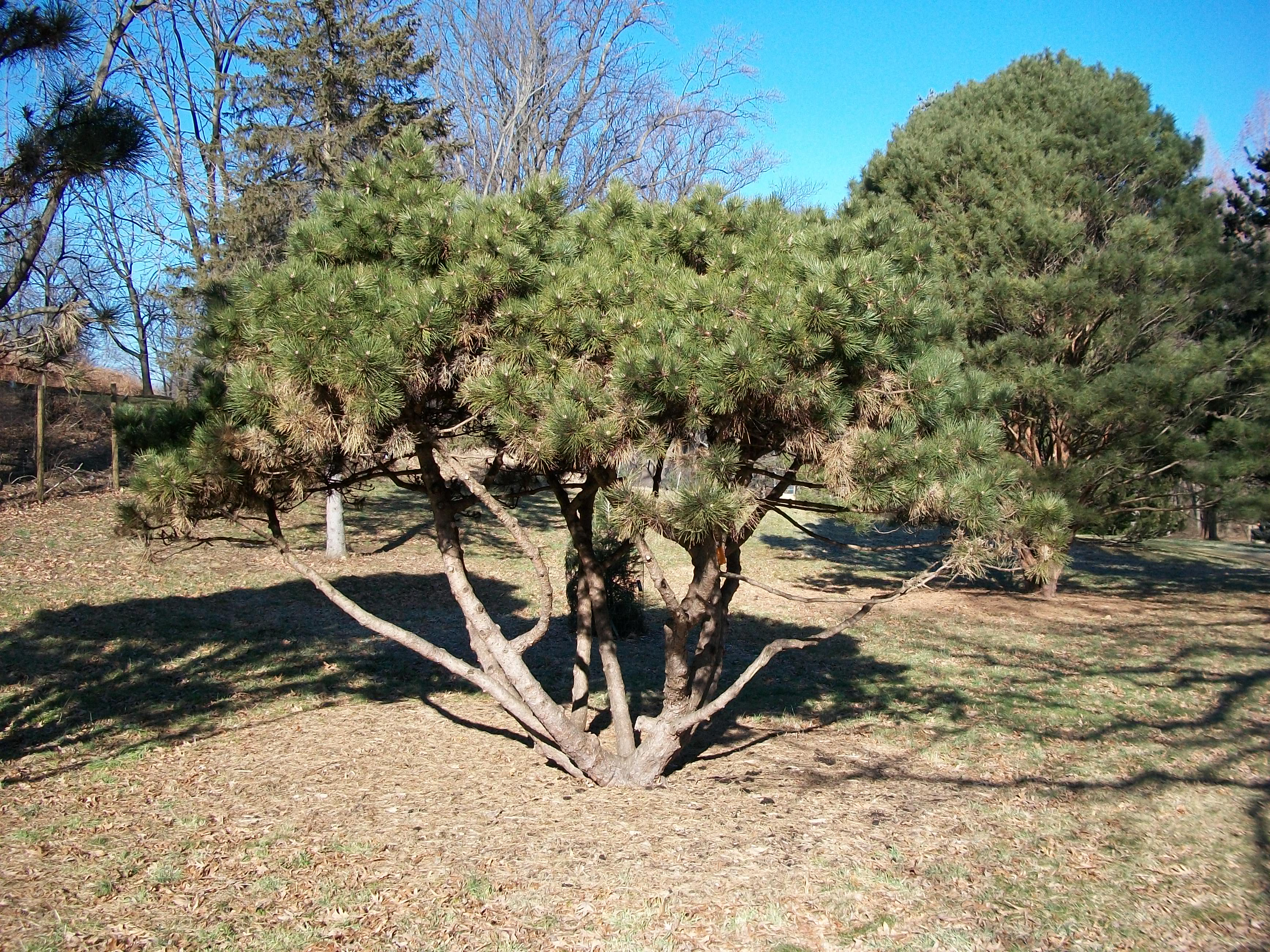
The preserve has a wide variety of trees, plants, and gardens. Young trees are sometimes enclosed with wire fences to prevent deer from eating the leaves.

== See also ==
- List of botanical gardens in the United States
