= Frederick Frelinghuysen (businessman) =

American businessman (1848–1924)

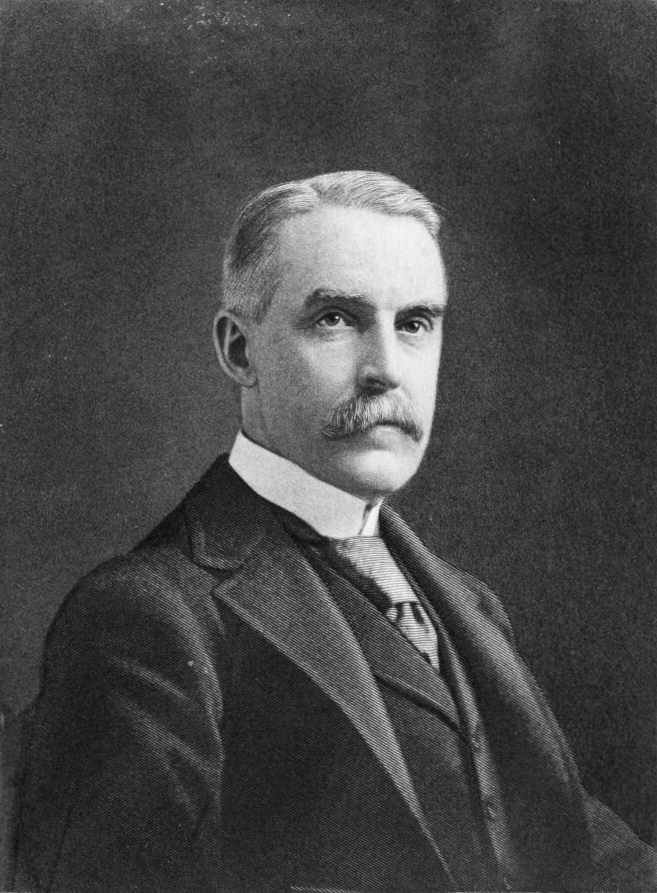
- Born: September 30, 1848; Newark, New Jersey
- Died: January 1, 1924 (aged 75); Newark, New Jersey
- Education: Rutgers College
- Occupation: President of the Mutual Benefit Life Insurance Company
- Spouse: Estelle B. Kinney
- Children: 5, including Suzy Frelinghuysen
- Parent: Frederick Theodore Frelinghuysen
- Relatives: George Griswold Frelinghuysen (brother); Theodore Frelinghuysen (brother)

Frederick Frelinghuysen (September 30, 1848 – January 1, 1924) was an American businessman. He was the president of the Mutual Benefit Life Insurance Company in Newark, New Jersey, for 25 years.

== Early life ==
Frelinghuysen was born on September 30, 1848, in Newark, New Jersey. He was a son of Frederick Theodore Frelinghuysen and Matilda Elizabeth Griswold (who was of English descent). His siblings included: Matilda Griswold Frelinghuysen (who married prominent merchant Henry Winthrop Gray); Charlotte Louisa Frelinghuysen; George Griswold Frelinghuysen; m. Sara Linen Ballantine (granddaughter of Peter Ballantine) prominent New York clubman Theodore Frelinghuysen; and Sarah Helen Frelinghuysen (who married Judge John Davis, and after his death, Brig. Gen. Charles Laurie McCawley). (Note: Through his sister Sarah and niece Mathilda Elizabeth Frelinghuysen (née Davis) Lodge (1876–1960), who married George Cabot Lodge, he was the grand-uncle of Henry Cabot Lodge Jr. (1902–1985), the diplomat and U.S. senator from Massachusetts, and John Davis Lodge (1903–1985), also a diplomat, U.S. Representative, and Governor of Connecticut.) His father was a lawyer who served as a U.S. Senator and later as Secretary of State under President Chester A. Arthur.

His paternal grandparents were Frederick Frelinghuysen and Mary (née Dumont) Frelinghuysen. His grandfather died when his father was just three years old, so his father was adopted by his uncle, Theodore Frelinghuysen. (Note: His grand-uncle and adopted grandfather, Theodore Frelinghuysen, was Attorney General of New Jersey from 1817 to 1829, was a U.S. Senator from New Jersey from 1829 to 1835, was the Whig candidate for Vice President of the United States on the Henry Clay ticket in the 1844 Presidential election, and was Chancellor of New York University from 1839 until 1850 and president of Rutgers College from 1850 to 1862.) Both grandfather and adopted grandfather were sons of Frederick Frelinghuysen, the eminent lawyer who was one of the framers of the first New Jersey Constitution, a soldier in the American Revolutionary War, a member of the Continental Congress, and a member of the United States Senate. His maternal grandfather George Griswold, was a merchant in New York City who "made an immense fortune in the time of the clipper trade with China."

He graduated from Rutgers College in 1868.

== Career ==
Frelinghuysen was admitted to the bar as an attorney in 1871 and as a counselor in 1874. He became president of the Howard Savings Institution. He resigned that post to become president of the Mutual Benefit Life Insurance Company.

== Personal life ==
On July 23, 1902, he was married to Estelle Burnet Kinney (1868–1931), a daughter of Thomas Talmadge Kinney and Estelle Burnet (née Condit) Kinney. Her paternal grandfather was Chargé d'Affaires to the Kingdom of Sardinia William Burnet Kinney (whose second wife was writer Elizabeth Clementine Stedman). Together, they lived in Elberon, New Jersey, and were the parents of four sons and one daughter including:

- Frederick Frelinghuysen (1903–1966), who married Elizabeth (née Lyman) Harrower, a daughter of Maj. Ronald T. Lyman and Elizabeth Van Cortlandt (née Parker) Lyman, in 1937. She was the former wife of Gordon Harrower.
- Thomas Talmadge Kinney Frelinghuysen (b. 1905), a sculptor who married Roselyne de Viry, a daughter of Baron Humbert and Baroness Delphine Marie de Viry, (Note: Roselyn's mother, Baroness Delphine Marie de Viry was a daughter of Count Maximillien de Foras and the Countess de Foras (the former Marie Delphine Read, a daughter of the American diplomat J. Meredith Read).) of Thonon-les-Bains, Haute Savoie, and Shipton Court, Lenox, Massachusetts (today the Seven Hills Inn), in 1949.
- Theodore Frelinghuysen (b. 1907).
- George Griswold Frelinghuysen II (1908–2002), who married Anne de Smolianinof, a daughter of Grand Master of Imperial Court Vladimir N. de Smolianinof, in 1934.
- Estelle C. "Suzy" Frelinghuysen (1911–1988), who married fellow painter George Lovett Kingsland Morris.

He died in the Post Graduate Hospital after a three-week illness in Manhattan, New York City, on January 1, 1924. His widow died on May 13, 1931.
