= George L. K. Morris =

American artist and writer (1905–1975)

- Born: George Lovett Kingsland Morris; November 14, 1905; New York City, US
- Died: June 26, 1975 (aged 69); Stockbridge, Massachusetts, US
- Education: Yale University; Art Students League of New York
- Spouse: Suzy Frelinghuysen (m. 1935)
- Relatives: Newbold Morris (brother); Augustus Newbold Morris (grandfather)

George Lovett Kingsland Morris (November 14, 1905 – June 26, 1975) was an American artist, writer, and editor who advocated for an "American abstract art" during the 1930s and 1940s, and is best known for his Cubist sculptures and paintings.

== Early life ==
Morris was born into a privileged family in Manhattan, New York City on November 14, 1905. He was the second son of Augustus Newbold Morris and Helen Schermerhorn Kingsland, who were married in 1896. His brothers were Newbold Morris, a lawyer, president of the New York City Council, and two-time candidate for mayor of New York City, and Stephen Van Cortlandt Morris, a diplomat.

The brothers' paternal grandparents were Augustus Newbold Morris and Eleanor Colford Jones. Eleanor's parents were General James I. Jones and Elizabeth (née Schermerhorn) Jones, an older sister of Caroline Schermerhorn Astor, also known as "The Mrs. Astor." Their father was also a descendant of Lewis Morris, a signer of the United States Declaration of Independence, from the prominent Colonial-era Morris family of the Morrisania section of the Bronx.

Morris attended Groton School, and graduated from Yale University in 1928. From 1928 to 1929, he studied with realist painters John French Sloan and Kenneth Hayes Miller at the Art Students League of New York. In 1929, he traveled to Paris with Albert Eugene Gallatin. In Paris, he continued his studies with Fernand Léger and Amédée Ozenfant.

== Career ==
Heraldic Abstraction (1942), The Phillips Collection

While in Paris, he became a confirmed abstractionist, and continued writing and publishing on modern movements upon his return to New York. During World War II, Morris worked for a naval architect's firm as a draftsman.

Although Morris exhibited frequently during the 1930s and 1940s, his paintings and sculpture received greatest recognition after the war. He remaining a dedicated practitioner of his own form of Cubism, even as colleagues and friends turned to expressionism in the postwar era.

From 1937 through 1943, Morris served as editor, art critic, and patron of the relaunched radical literary magazine Partisan Review, where he advocated for abstract art. After 1947, he began writing less and focused primarily on painting and sculpture. He was also a founding member of the American Abstract Artists, serving as president of the group in the 1940s.

=== Legacy ===
In 2014, Harry Holtzman and L. K. Morris, two founding members of American Abstract Artists were paired in an intimate 2-man exhibit, curated by Kinney Frelinghuysen and Madalena Holtzman, and designed to evoke an informal conversation between the two artists. L.K. Morris Harry Holtzman Pioneers of American Modernism: Points of Contact. Essays by T. Kinney Frelinghuysen, Madalena Holtzman, Wietse Coppes. Catalogue published on the occasion of the exhibition from June 26 to October 12, 2014 at the Frelinghuysen Morris House and Studio in Lenox.

This exhibition marked also the beginning of a collaboration between the Estates of George L. K. Morris and Holtzman, with support of the Netherlands Institute for Art History. The collaboration aimed at sharing, editing and exhibiting new historical materials related and connected to the world of abstract art of the seminal period of the 1930s and 1940s in Europe and in the USA. For this reason in this first show were present also the works of other European protagonists of the time like Jean Hélion, Cesar Domela, and Ben Nicholson. A project, that duly enlarged and in the details curated will be evolving into a wider exhibition initiative.

Morris' artworks appear in numerous museum collections, including The Phillips Collection and the Smithsonian American Art Museum. He is best known for his brightly colored, geometric hard-edge paintings, such as Recessional, from 1950, in the collection of the Honolulu Museum of Art.

== Personal life ==
In 1935, Morris married fellow artist Estelle Condit "Suzy" Frelinghuysen (1911–1988). She was the daughter of Frederick Frelinghuysen (1848-1936) and his wife Estelle B. Kinney. Their Lenox, Massachusetts home and studio, constructed in 1930-1941, is now a museum. They had a dog, a red haired Pekingese named "Miss Rose," who was listed in the Social Register in 1936.

Morris died in an automobile accident, in Stockbridge, Massachusetts on June 26, 1975.
