= Suzy Frelinghuysen =

American painter and soprano (1911–1988)

- Frelinghuysen and George L. K. Morris
- Born: Estelle Condit Frelinghuysen; May 7, 1911; Newark, New Jersey, US
- Died: March 19, 1988 (aged 76); Lenox, Massachusetts, US
- Other name: Suzy Morris
- Known for: Painting, opera singer, music
- Movement: Modernism, Abstraction, Cubism
- Spouse: George L.K. Morris (m. 1935; died 1975)
- Relatives: Frelinghuysen family

Suzy Frelinghuysen (May 7, 1911 – March 19, 1988), also known as Suzy Morris, was an American abstract painter and opera singer.

== Early and personal life ==
Frelinghuysen was born in Newark, New Jersey, to Frederick Frelinghuysen and his wife Estelle B. Kinney, who were married in 1902. She was descended from various politicians, including her grandfather Frederick T. Frelinghuysen—Secretary of State under Chester A. Arthur—and her great-great-uncle, New Jersey Senator Theodore Frelinghuysen. She was educated at Miss Fine's School in Princeton, and later studied voice. She displayed an early interest in painting and drawing but never undertook formal art studies; she was separately tutored in art and music, all the time making childhood trips to Europe.

On January 30, 1935, she married George L. K. Morris, an abstract painter and collector who encouraged her to pursue an artistic career. Their Lenox, Massachusetts home and studio, constructed in 1930–1941, is now a museum.

== Career ==
=== Painting ===
Frelinghuysen's paintings were done in a realist style until the time of her marriage to Morris in 1935. Morris introduced her to the work of European modernists such as Pablo Picasso, Fernand Léger, Georges Braque, and Juan Gris, which inspired her to explore a more abstract Cubist manner. In April 1937, she and Morris were founding members of the American Abstract Artists—an organization that challenged the Museum of Modern Art's preoccupation with American Scene painting.

In 1938, Frelinghuysen became the first woman to have a painting placed in the permanent collection of A.E. Gallatin's Museum of Living Art. She took part, in Paris, at the Salon des Réalités Nouvelles, and exhibited also in Rome and Amsterdam.

From 1938 to 1946, Frelinghuysen was most successful exhibiting her artwork in Gallitan's Museum of Living Art – exhibition of the Park Avenue Artists, which traveled to Chicago, San Francisco, and Honolulu; at a show created by Peggy Guggenheim; and at the Philadelphia Museum of Art in the show Eight by Eight: American Abstract Painting since 1940. By 1947 Frelinghuysen had moved on from painting, and began to focus on her singing career.

In 1943, Frelinghuysen's work was included in Peggy Guggenheim's show Exhibition by 31 Women at the Art of This Century gallery in New York.

=== Opera ===
As Suzy Morris, the dramatic soprano appeared with the New York City Opera from 1947 to 1950, in Ariadne auf Naxos (in the title role, opposite Virginia MacWatters as Zerbinetta), Cavalleria rusticana (as Santuzza, conducted by Julius Rudel), Tosca (as Floria Tosca), Aïda (as Amneris, with Camilla Williams, Ramón Vinay, and Lawrence Winters, directed by Theodore Komisarjevsky), and Les contes d'Hoffmann (as Giulietta).

Following that last appearance with the City Opera, she debuted in 1950 with the New Orleans Opera Association, as Amelia in Un ballo in maschera. That performance, which was broadcast, also featured Jussi Björling, Marko Rothmüller, Martha Larrimore, the young Norman Treigle (as Samuele), as well as Audrey Schuh (as Oscar, her first major role). In 1998, VAI released this performance on compact disc.

After a 1951 bout of bronchitis, she retired from the stage, and once more became a full-time painter.

== Death and legacy ==
Frelinghuysen died of a stroke on March 19, 1988 in Pittsfield, Massachusetts at age 76. Her work can be viewed in the collections of the Metropolitan Museum of Art, the Philadelphia Museum of Art, the Smithsonian American Art Museum, the Carnegie Art Institute, and her home and studio museum in Lenox, Massachusetts.

== Exhibitions ==
- 1937–1947, American Abstract Artists Annual Exhibitions, New York City, New York
- 1937, Park Avenue Cubist Show at Paul Reinhardt Galleries with Morris, A.E. Gallatin, and Charles G. Shaw
- 1940, Park Avenue Cubist Show: Tours Chicago, San Francisco, Honolulu
- 1940, Peggy Guggenheim show: 31 contemporary women artists
- 1944, Annual Exhibition, Whitney Museum of American Art
- 1945, Eight by Eight: American Abstract Painting since 1940, Philadelphia Museum of Art
- 1986, American Abstract Artists 50th Anniversary Exhibition

== Collections ==
- Carnegie Museum of Art, Pittsburgh, Pennsylvania
- Metropolitan Museum of Art, New York City, New York
- Philadelphia Museum of Art, Philadelphia, Pennsylvania
- Smithsonian American Art Museum, Washington, D.C.
- The Phillips Collection, Washington, D.C.
- Whitney Museum of Art, New York City, New York
