= John Frelinghuysen =

John Frelinghuysen may refer to:

- John Frelinghuysen (minister) (1727–1754), American clergyman and son of Theodorus Jacobus Frelinghuysen
- John Frederick Frelinghuysen (1776–1833), U.S. Army general and lawyer
