= Senator Robbins (disambiguation) =

Asher Robbins (1761–1845) was a U.S. Senator from Rhode Island from 1825 to 1839. Senator Robbins may also refer to:

- Alan Robbins (born 1943), California State Senate
- Edward Everett Robbins (1860–1919), Pennsylvania State Senate
- Robert D. Robbins (born 1944), Pennsylvania State Senate
- Samuel K. Robbins (1853–1926), New Jersey State Senate

== See also ==
- C. A. Robins (1884–1970), Idaho State Senate
