= General John Frelinghuysen House =

Historic house in New Jersey, United States

- U.S. National Register of Historic Places
- New Jersey Register of Historic Places
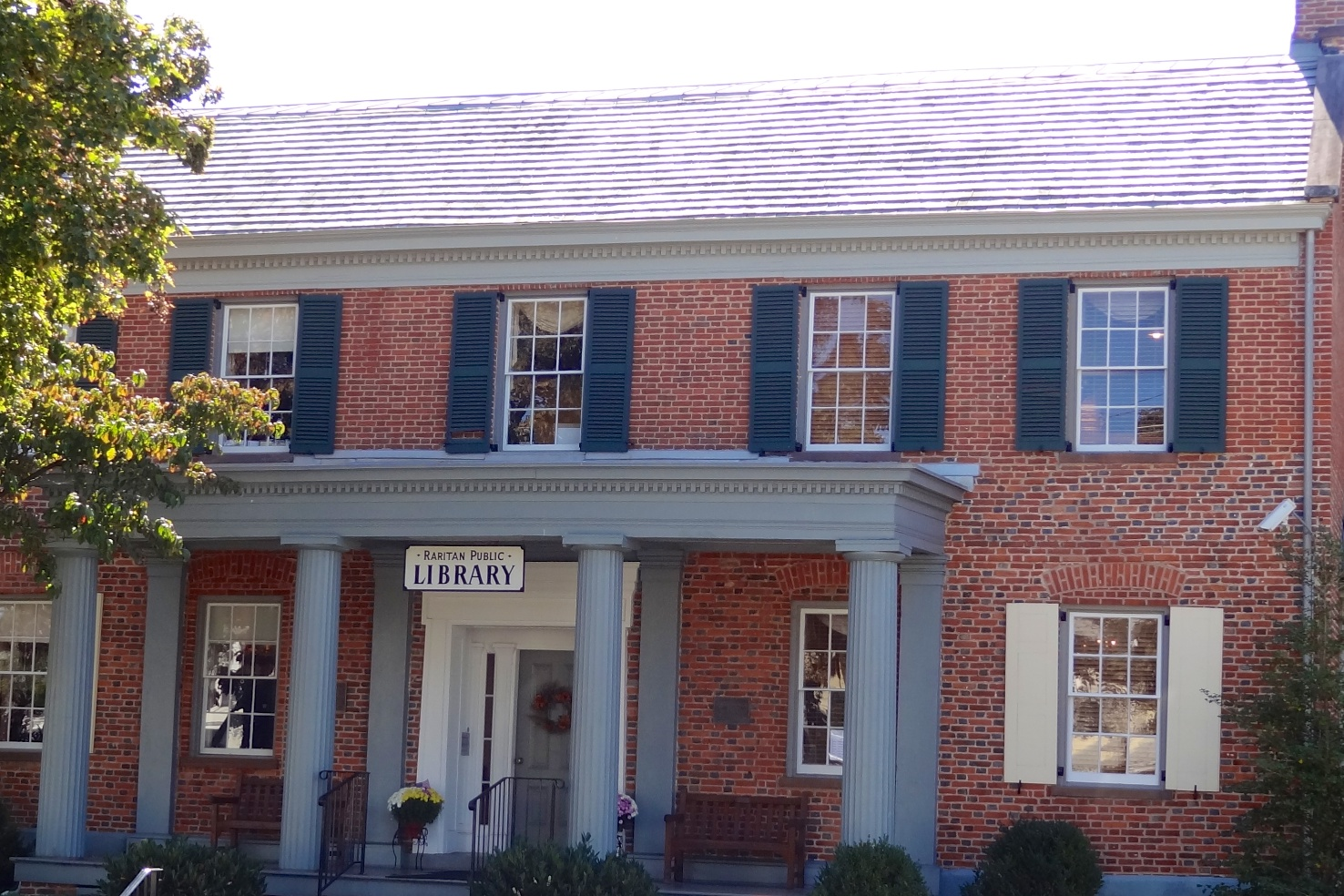
- Frelinghuysen Homestead

- Location within Somerset County, New Jersey Location within New Jersey Location within the United States
- Location: Somerset Street and Wyckoff Avenue; Raritan, New Jersey
- Coordinates: 40°34′5″N 74°37′46″W
- Built: Frame wing before 1756; Brick section after 1801
- Architectural style: Federal
- NRHP reference No.: 71000513
- NJRHP No.: 2578

Significant dates
- Added to NRHP: March 4, 1971
- Designated NJRHP: February 1, 1971

The General John Frelinghuysen House is a historic building located in Raritan, New Jersey. The older west wing was originally a tavern, built sometime before 1756 by Cornelius Bogert, when it also served as the town's meeting hall. It was bought in 1801 by John Frelinghuysen and then came to be known as the Frelinghuysen Homestead. It is an excellent example of early 19th century Federal architecture in New Jersey. In 1975, it was donated by Peter Frelinghuysen, Jr. to the borough and now serves as the Raritan Public Library.

== History ==
The house has two historic sections: the main two-story brick house, built sometime after 1801, and an older frame wing on the west, built sometime before 1756.

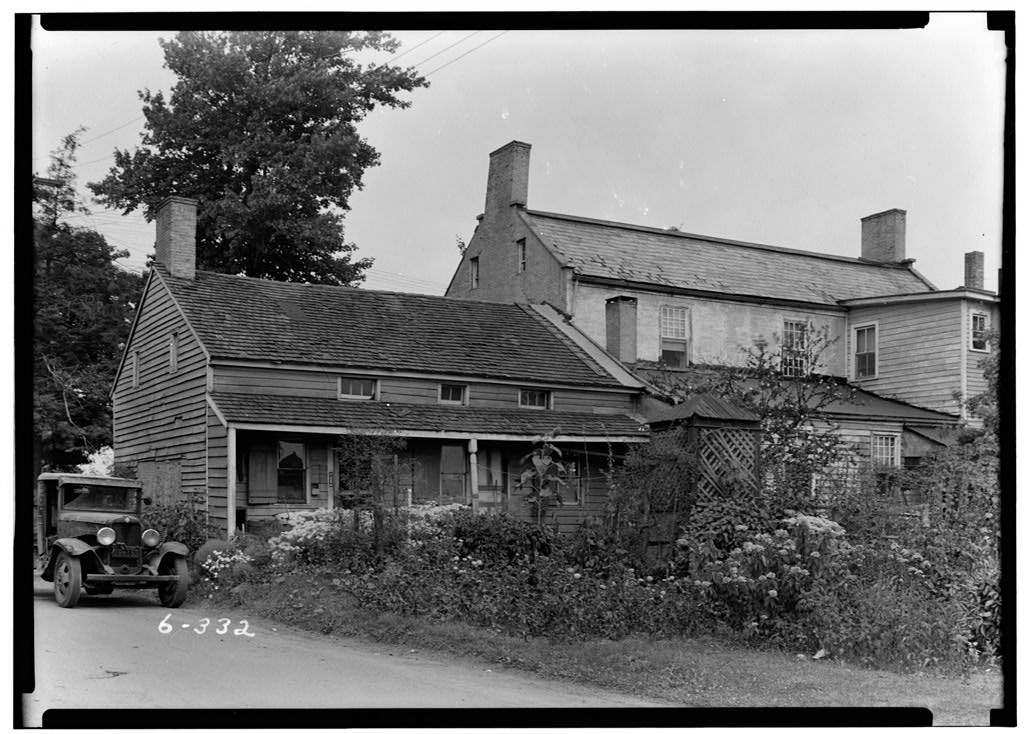
1937 photo of older frame wing, on left

Derrick Middagh bought the property on May 1, 1709, from Peter Van Nest. Cornelius Middagh then inherited it from his father, Derrick. Cornelius Bogert built a house here, which was used as a tavern, and served as the town's meeting hall from 1756 to 1769. The house was later sold to John Arrison and then to Henry Traphagen, before being bought by John Frelinghuysen. This forms the older west wing of the current building.

John Frelinghuysen purchased the house from Traphagen in 1801, but c. 1804, at the death of his father, Frederick, went to the Millstone family estate to manage the property there and take care of his brothers, Theodore and Frederick. He returned to this property in 1810. At some time he built the brick section of the building, using imported Dutch brick. He served in the War of 1812 and was promoted to brigadier general. Thus the full name of the property is the General John Frelinghuysen House.

The family sold the property in 1924 to the Glazier family.

The house was renovated in the early 1970s by architect John M. Dickey.

== Architecture ==
In 1936, the house was described as "a veritable mansion compared to the majority of Dutch houses." It had an early 19th-century doorway and a neo-classic portico. The interior rooms had very high ceilings.

== Raritan Public Library ==
The Raritan Public Library, founded June, 1961, was initially located in the Relief Home Company No. 2 Engine House. In 1975, Peter Frelinghuysen, Jr. donated the family homestead, the General John Frelinghuysen House, to the borough for use as the library.

The library contains memorabilia dedicated to the memory of Medal of Honor recipient John Basilone.

== Bibliography ==
- Bailey, Rosalie Fellows (1936). Pre-Revolutionary Dutch Houses and Families in Northern New Jersey and Southern New York. New York: William Morrow & Company.
- Snell, James P. (1881). History of Hunterdon and Somerset Counties, New Jersey. Philadelphia: Everts & Peck.
