= Joseph S. Frelinghuysen Sr. =

American politician

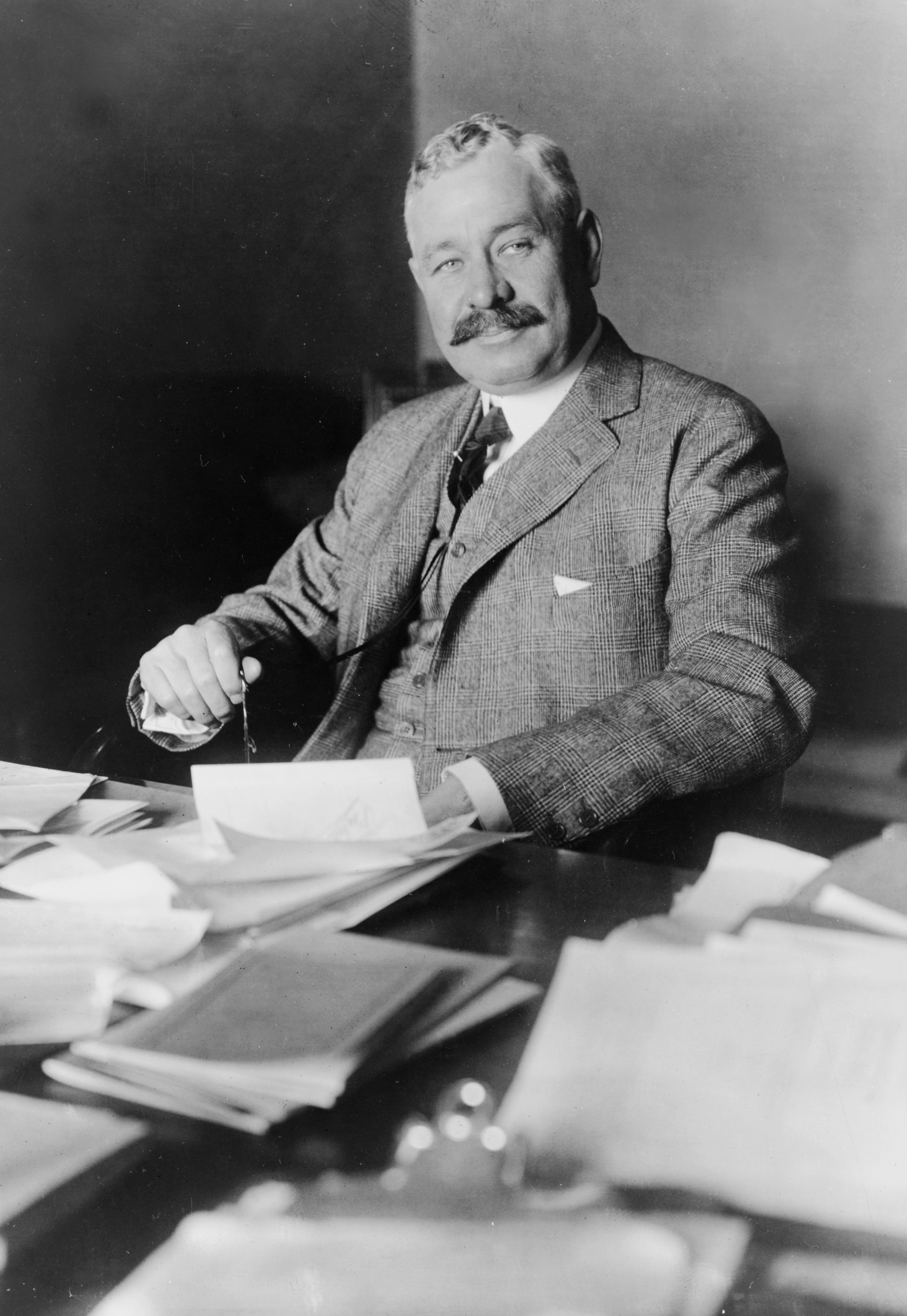

United States Senator from New Jersey
- In office March 4, 1917 – March 3, 1923
- Preceded by: James E. Martine
- Succeeded by: Edward I. Edwards

President of the New Jersey Senate
- In office 1909–1910
- Preceded by: Samuel K. Robbins
- Succeeded by: Ernest R. Ackerman

Member of the New Jersey Senate from Somerset County
- In office 1906–1912
- Preceded by: Samuel S. Childs
- Succeeded by: William W. Smalley

Personal details
- Born: March 12, 1869 Raritan, New Jersey, US
- Died: February 8, 1948 (aged 78) Tucson, Arizona, US
- Resting place: Saint Bernards Cemetery
- Party: Republican
- Spouse: Emily Macy Brewster
- Children: Victoria F. Bates; Emily F. McFarland; Joseph S. Frelinghuysen Jr.
- Parent(s): Frederick Frelinghuysen; Victoria Sherman

Joseph Sherman Frelinghuysen Sr. (March 12, 1869 – February 8, 1948) represented New Jersey as a Republican in the United States Senate from 1917 to 1923.

== Early life and family ==
He was born in Raritan, New Jersey, on March 12, 1869, to Frederick Frelinghuysen (1818–1891) and Victoria Bowen (1830–1914). His father was a lawyer who studied under Richard Stockton Field. He came from a historic New Jersey political family. His paternal grandparents were John Frederick Frelinghuysen (1776–1833), a lawyer and brigadier general in the War of 1812, and his second wife, Elizabeth Mercereau Van Vechten. His great-grandparents were Frederick Frelinghuysen (1753–1804), lawyer, soldier, and Senator from New Jersey, and his first wife, Gertrude Schenck (1752/53–1794).

== Career ==
After fighting in the Spanish–American War and starting an insurance business, Frelinghuysen was elected to the state Senate in 1905 and became president of that body in 1909. He held several statewide offices before being elected to the U.S. Senate in 1916. He was New Jersey's first directly elected senator after the 1913 ratification of the 17th Amendment to the Constitution. While in the Senate, he frequented the Chevy Chase Club and often golfed with fellow senators Warren G. Harding, Stephen B. Elkins, and Eugene Hale.

On July 2, 1921, President Warren G. Harding signed the Knox–Porter Resolution, which officially ended America's involvement in World War I, at Frelinghuysen's estate in Raritan. Harding stayed at the estate until at least July 4.

After a failed reelection bid in 1922, Frelinghuysen returned to the insurance business.

In 1938, Frelinghuysen considered running for one of New Jersey's Senate seats, but decided instead to back another former senator and fellow Republican: W. Warren Barbour. Barbour won the seat, then served until his death in 1943.

== Personal life ==
Frelinghuysen married Emily Macy Brewster. Together they had three children:

- Victoria Frelinghuysen (1907–2002), who married John Grenville Bates Jr.
- Emily Frelinghuysen, who married H. Edward Bilkey until his death in 1950 and later married Dr. Ross A. McFarland of the Harvard School of Public Health.
- Joseph S. Frelinghuysen Jr. (1912–2005), who married Emily Lawrance (1911–2004), the daughter of Charles Lawrance (1882–1950) and Emily Margaret Gordon Dix, and the granddaughter of Rev. Morgan Dix (1827–1908), the rector of Trinity Parish.

Swiss-born American artist Adolfo Müller-Ury painted a portrait of Frelinghuysen's wife and son in 1916; it is today in the Newark Museum, New Jersey. Frelinghuysen owned an 88-foot houseboat, Victoria, that Harding used for 12 days after he won the 1920 election for President, but before he was inaugurated in March 1921.

Frelinghuysen died on February 8, 1948, in Tucson, Arizona, and was interred at St. Bernard's Cemetery in Bernardsville, New Jersey.

=== Legacy ===
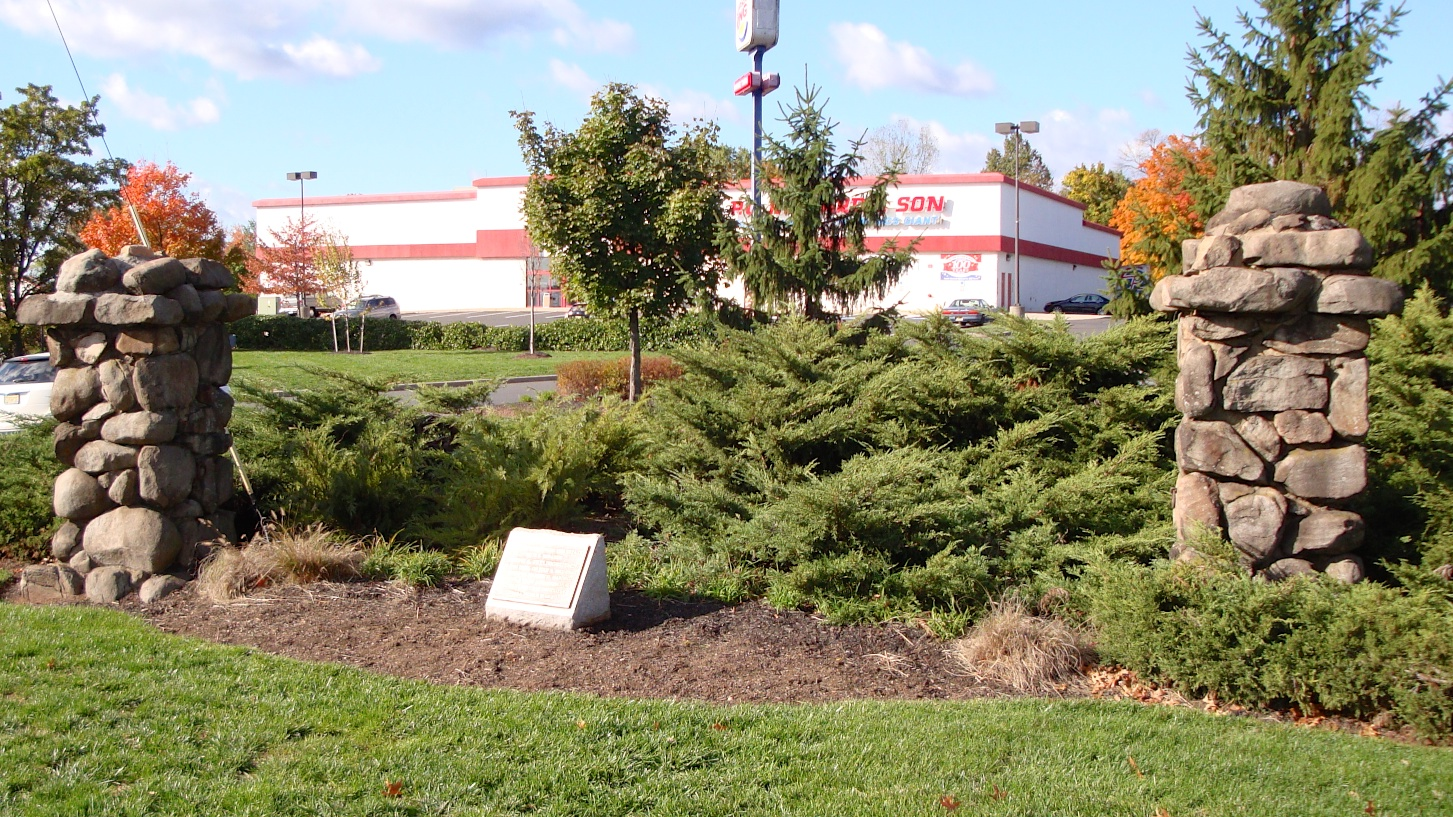
Memorial plaque marking Frelinghuysen estate site and signing of the Knox–Porter resolution on July 2, 1921.

A memorial plaque was placed on the estate grounds commemorating the Knox–Porter Resolution. Today the estate is long gone and suburban sprawl has replaced it with mini-malls. The marker remains in a patch of grass near a Burger King parking lot along Route 28, just north of the Somerville traffic circle.

U.S. Senate
Preceded by James E. Martine	U.S. Senator (Class 1) from New Jersey; 1917–1923	Succeeded by Edward I. Edwards
Political offices
Preceded by Samuel K. Robbins	President of the New Jersey Senate; 1909–1910	Succeeded by Ernest R. Ackerman
Party political offices
Preceded by None	Republican Nominee for the U.S. Senate (Class 1) from New Jersey; 1916, 1922	Succeeded by Hamilton F. Kean
