= John Frelinghuysen (minister) =

John Frelinghuysen (1727–1754)
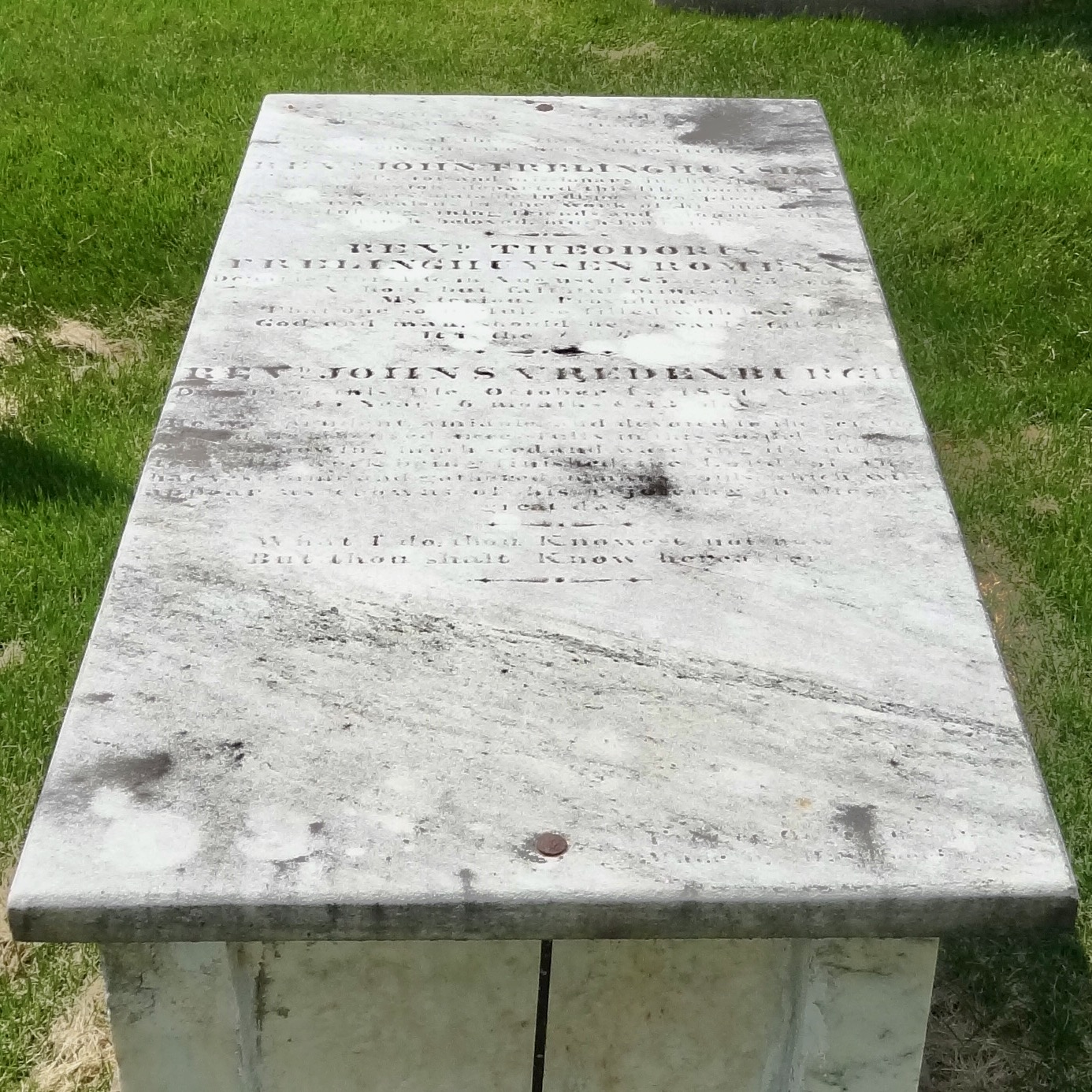
- Tombstone
- Born: 1727; Holland
- Died: September 5, 1754 (aged 26–27); Old Dutch Parsonage in Somerville, New Jersey
- Resting place: Old Somerville Cemetery

John Frelinghuysen (1727 – September 5, 1754) also known as Johannes Frelinghuysen was a minister in colonial New Jersey whose work in education laid the groundwork for the establishment Rutgers University (as Queen's College in 1766) and the New Brunswick Theological Seminary (in 1784).

== Biography ==
John Frelinghuysen was the second son of Theodorus Jacobus Frelinghuysen (1691–1749), a German who had lived for a short time in Holland before emigrating in 1720. John married Dinah Van Bergh (1725–1807), and they had two children: Eva Frelinghuysen (1751 – c. 1826), Frederick Frelinghuysen (1753–1804), who became a major general in the American Revolution.

John preached in the revivalistic style of Calvinism that his father was known for as part of the First Great Awakening. He continued to serve the parishes in New Jersey that his father had served at Raritan, Millstone, and North Branch. John lived in the Old Dutch Parsonage in Somerville where he served the three local congregations until his death. He took in students and a room in the house served as a Dutch Reformed religious seminary. This center of education was a forerunner of the New Brunswick Theological Seminary and Queen's College, which later developed into Rutgers University. John died on September 5, 1754, and was buried at the Old Somerville Cemetery.

== Children ==
John married Dinah VanBerg and had the following children:

- Eva Frelinghuysen (1751 – c. 1826), who married Casparus Van Nostrand
- Frederick Frelinghuysen (1753–1804), major general who was buried in Weston, New Jersey.
