= William G. Steele =

American politician

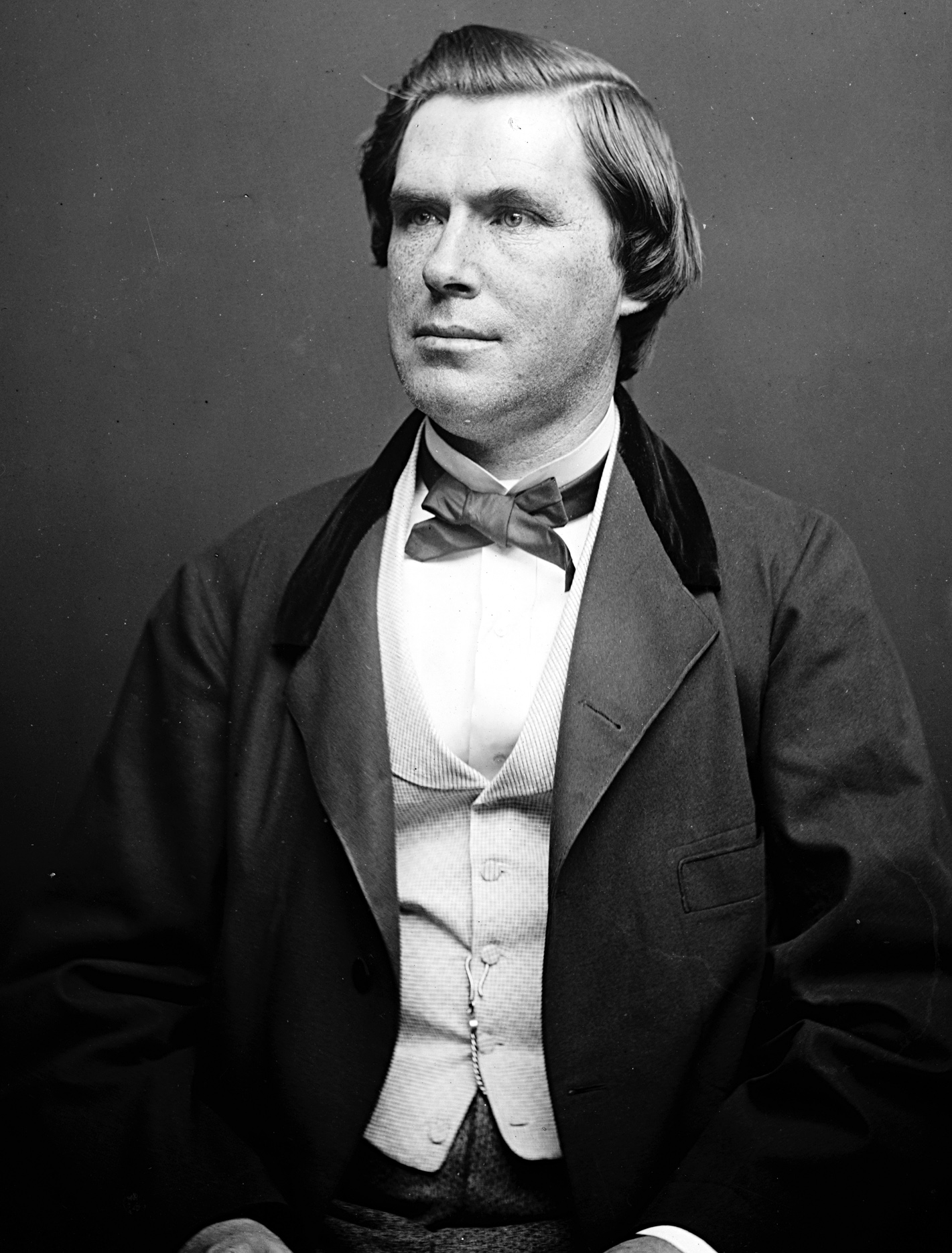
- Mathew Brady Collection, Library of Congress

Member of the U.S. House of Representatives from New Jersey's 3rd district
- In office March 4, 1861 – March 3, 1865
- Preceded by: Garnett Adrain
- Succeeded by: Charles Sitgreaves

Personal details
- Born: William Gaston Steele; December 17, 1820 Somerville, New Jersey
- Died: April 22, 1892 (aged 71) Somerville, New Jersey
- Resting place: Somerville Cemetery
- Party: Democratic
- Profession: Politician

William Gaston Steele (December 17, 1820, Somerville, New Jersey – April 22, 1892, Somerville, New Jersey) was a 19th-century American banker who served as a Democratic Party politician. He served two terms as a U.S. congressman, representing New Jersey's 3rd congressional district from 1861 to 1865.

== Biography ==
Steele was born in Somerville, New Jersey on December 17, 1820, where he attended the public schools and Somerville Academy. He engaged in banking.

=== Congress ===
Steele was elected as a Democrat to the thirty-seventh and thirty-eighth Congresses, in office from March 4, 1861 – March 3, 1865. His vote on the Thirteenth Amendment is recorded as nay.

After leaving Congress he engaged in the brokerage business.

=== Death and burial ===
He died in Somerville on April 22, 1892, and was interred in Somerville Cemetery.

U.S. House of Representatives
Preceded by Garnett Adrain	Member of the U.S. House of Representatives from New Jersey's 3rd congressional district March 4, 1861 – March 3, 1865	Succeeded by Charles Sitgreaves
