= 1793 New Jersey gubernatorial election =

- June 3, 1793
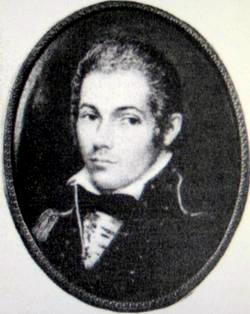

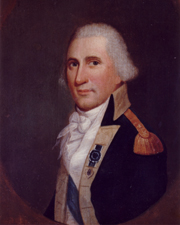

Nominee	Richard Howell	Frederick Frelinghuysen	John Rutherford
Party	Federalist	Federalist
Popular vote	25	14	9
Percentage	52.08%	29.17%	18.75%
Governor before election
Thomas Henderson (Acting)
Federalist
Elected Governor
Richard Howell
Federalist

The 1793 New Jersey gubernatorial election was held on June 3, 1793, in order to elect the Governor of New Jersey. Federalist candidate Richard Howell was elected by the New Jersey General Assembly against fellow Federalist candidate and incumbent United States Senator from New Jersey Frederick Frelinghuysen and candidate John Rutherford.

== General election ==
On election day, June 3, 1793, Federalist candidate Richard Howell was elected by the New Jersey General Assembly by a margin of 11 votes against his foremost opponent and fellow Federalist candidate Frederick Frelinghuysen, thereby retaining Federalist control over the office of Governor. Howell was sworn in as the 3rd Governor of New Jersey that same day.

=== Results ===
New Jersey gubernatorial election, 1793
Party	Candidate	Votes	%
Federalist	Richard Howell	25	52.08%
Federalist	Frederick Frelinghuysen	14	29.17%
	John Rutherford	9	18.75%
Total votes		48	100.00%
Federalist hold			
