= Garnett Adrain =

American politician

Garnett Bowditch Adrain
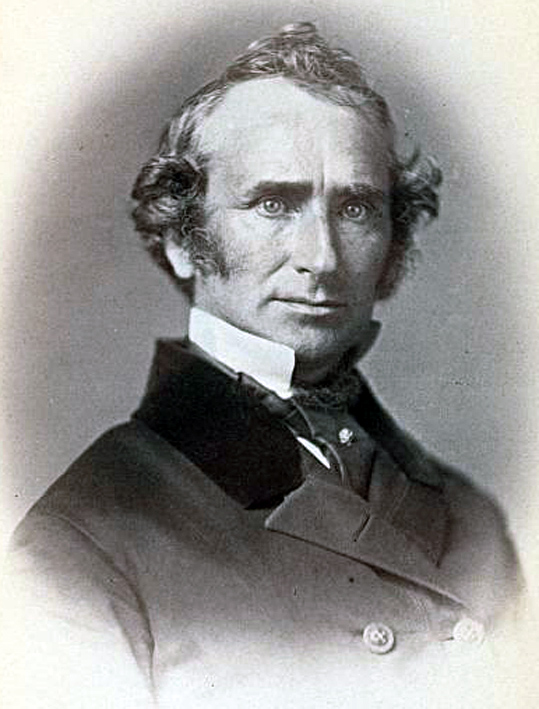

Member of the U.S. House of Representatives from New Jersey's 3rd district
- In office March 4, 1857 – March 3, 1861
- Preceded by: James Bishop
- Succeeded by: William G. Steele

Personal details
- Born: December 15, 1815 New York City, New York, U.S.
- Died: August 17, 1878 (aged 62) New Brunswick, New Jersey, U.S.
- Party: Democratic
- Profession: Politician

Garnett Bowditch Adrain (December 15, 1815 in New York City – August 17, 1878 in New Brunswick, New Jersey) was an American Democratic Party politician, who was a two-term member of the United States House of Representatives from New Jersey from 1857 to 1861.

== Early life and education ==
Adrain was born to Robert Adrain and Ann Pollock in a family of seven children. He moved with his parents to New Brunswick, New Jersey, where he attended public schools before he graduated from Rutgers College, New Brunswick, in 1833. He went on to study law in his brother's office. Adrain was licensed as an attorney in 1836 and as a counselor in 1839.

He married Mary Smith Griggs (1817–1886).

== U.S. House of Representatives ==
He was elected as a Democrat to the Thirty-fifth Congress and as an Anti-Lecompton Democrat to the Thirty-sixth Congress, serving in Congress from March 4, 1857 to March 3, 1861, where he represented New Jersey's 3rd congressional district. He was chairman of the Engraving Committee in both congresses.

He was not a candidate for reelection in 1860 and went back to his profession as an attorney.

== Death ==
He died in New Brunswick on August 17, 1878, and was buried in Van Liew Cemetery, North Brunswick, New Jersey.

== Quotes ==
- Secession—peaceable secession, as it is called ... in fact rebellion.
- Nothing but a rope of sand, of no strength whatever to hold the States together, and which may be broken at any moment.

== Name ==
The name Bowditch in his name originates from Nathaniel Bowditch, a prominent author who worked with his father.

U.S. House of Representatives
Preceded by James Bishop	Member of the U.S. House of Representatives from New Jersey's 3rd congressional district March 4, 1857-March 3, 1861	Succeeded by William G. Steele
