= Knox–Porter Resolution =

1921 U.S. legislation formally ending U.S. involvement in World War I

- Other short titles: World War I Peace Resolution
- Nicknames: Public Resolution 8
- Enacted by: the 67th United States Congress
- Effective: July 2, 1921

Citations
- Public law: 67-8
- Statutes at Large: 42 Stat. 105

Legislative history
- Introduced in the Senate as S.J.Res. 16 by Philander C. Knox (R-PA) on April 25, 1921; Committee consideration by Senate Foreign Affairs, House Rules; Passed the Senate on April 30, 1921 (49-23); Passed the House on June 13, 1921 (304-61); Reported by the joint conference committee on June 17, 1921; agreed to by the House on June 30, 1921 (263-59) and by the Senate on July 1, 1921 (38-19); Signed into law by President Warren G. Harding on July 2, 1921

The Knox–Porter Resolution (42 Stat. 105) was a joint resolution of the United States Congress signed by President Warren G. Harding on July 2, 1921, officially ending United States involvement in World War I. The documents were signed on the estate of Joseph Sherman Frelinghuysen, Sr. in Raritan, New Jersey.

== History ==
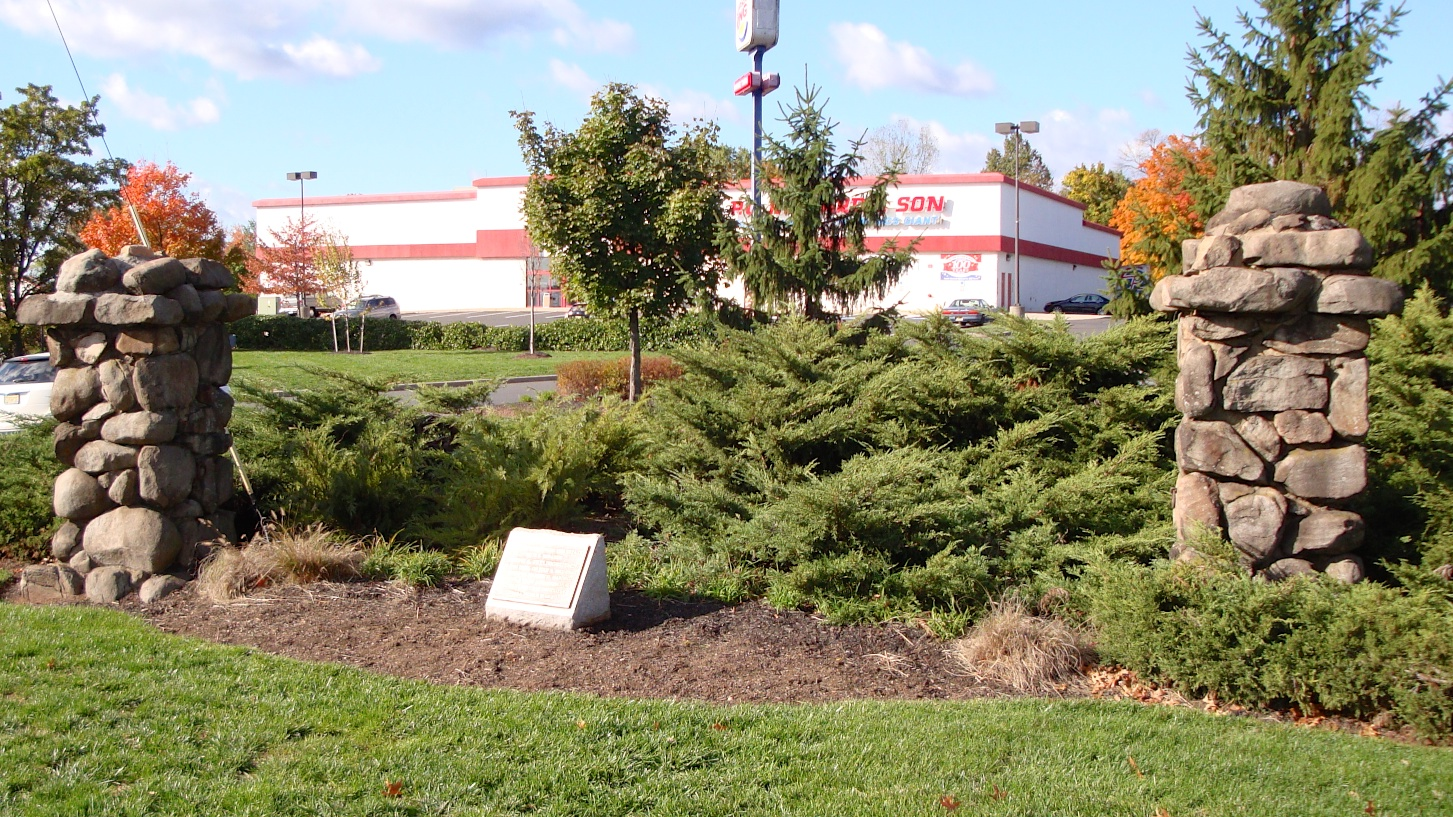
Memorial plaque marking Frelinghuysen estate site and signing of the Knox–Porter resolution on July 2, 1921.

On November 19, 1919, and again on March 19, 1920, the United States Senate voted against ratifying the Treaty of Versailles, forestalling American participation in the League of Nations. In a speech on April 12, 1921, before a special congressional session, President Harding reconfirmed American opposition to the League of Nations, calling on Congress to pass a peace resolution independent of the League. Senator Philander C. Knox of Pennsylvania introduced a resolution the following day, and it passed the Senate in late April.

The United States House of Representatives had its own slightly different resolution introduced by Representative Stephen G. Porter, Chairman of the Committee on Foreign Affairs. Passage of the House resolution was delayed in deference to negotiations between the Allies and Germany over a reparations settlement. In late June the House and Senate reconciled their differences, and the Knox–Porter joint resolution passed Congress on July 1.

The next day, Harding signed the resolution at the Frelinghuysen estate in Raritan, New Jersey. Harding and Senator Frehlinghuysen were playing golf at the Raritan Valley Country Club across the street when word arrived that a courier was on his way from the Raritan train station, having traveled from Washington with the signing copy of the resolution. Harding walked back to the estate, signed the document, and then returned to complete his round of golf. The Frelinghuysen estate was destroyed by fire in the 1950s, and the site is now occupied by a shopping center and parking lot, with a small plaque marking the place where the home once stood.

The article in the next day's New York Times concerning the signing started with the words, "War with Germany ended as it began, by Congressional declaration and Executive signature on American soil."

== See also ==
- 1921 U.S.–German Peace Treaty
- 1921 U.S.–Austrian Peace Treaty
- 1921 U.S.–Hungarian Peace Treaty
