= J. E. McConaughy =

American litterateur and author

- Born: Julia Eliza Loomis; January 1, 1834; Twinsburg, Ohio, U.S.
- Died: August 29, 1885 (aged 51); Somerville, New Jersey, U.S.
- Resting place: Somerville Cemetery, Somerville, New Jersey
- Education: Hudson Female Seminary
- Occupation: Writer
- Spouse: Nathaniel McConaughy (m. 1858)
- Children: 4
- Writing career
- Language: English
- Genre: Juvenile religious fiction

Julia Eliza McConaughy (née Loomis; January 1, 1834 – August 29, 1885) was an American writer. She was one of the largest contributors to religious literature of her day, writing a number of brief articles, and made contributions to Sunday school literature. She was also the author of 14 books and of 8,000 articles for 75 periodicals. Her writings were copied by other papers, and ran the rounds of the press, both in the United States and at times in England. The editor of one journal to which she was a constant contributor, informed her that she was the only contributor from whom he had never refused an article. She invariably refused to write for secular papers for the sake of higher remuneration, where her religious aim would have to be sacrificed or abriged.

== Early life and education ==
Julia Eliza Loomis was born in Twinsburg, Ohio, on January 1, 1834, to Eliza (née Mills) and Elisha Loomis. Her father removed from New Haven, Connecticut, to Ohio, in 1817, and was one of the early settlers of the Western Reserve.

From the age of seven, she was an insatiable reader. A fall from a carriage broke her ankle when she was ten years old and forced her to stay at home for some months, during which time she further developed her taste for reading. The library to which she had access was the garret of a neighbor, well stocked with files of old newspapers, a few magazines, and some volumes of Waverly. The first twelve years of her life were spent on a farm. Her father then removed to Hudson, Ohio, where she attended the Hudson Female Seminary, taught by Mary Strong, the daughter of Ephraim Strong. It was through her influence that McConaughy's interest in the subject of religion was first awakened. She united with the Congregational church at Hudson, at the age of fourteen.

== Career ==
During the course of her education, she became an assistant teacher in the seminary for ladies taught by Mary Strong, and for some years, taught there and in the village school. She then taught in the new seminary which succeeded Strong's, then in the high school at Akron, Ohio, and afterwards in Bloomfield, New Jersey, where she held the position of lady principal, having the responsible conduct of the school.

At the age of 24, she married Nathaniel McConaughy in New York City on June 14, 1858, and soon after removed to Millville, New Jersey, which was her home for eight years. She took on the duties of a minister's wife, actively taking the lead in ladies' prayer meetings, Sunday school, and Bible-class work, and all forms of Christian and charitable effort, visiting the sick, providing for the poor, and promoting schemes of benevolence. She afterwards spent two years at Swedesboro, New Jersey, before removing to Elwood, New Jersey.

At the age of 21, she had begun to write newspaper articles for the press. She continued to write until her death. Her first article for the press was "Learning Hymns," published in the New York Evangelist in 1855.

As the family grew up around her, she still devoted herself to writing, and for 30 years, contributed articles, averaging about one a day, to many of the religious journals of the period. Among these were: The Presbyterian of Philadelphia; The New York Evangelist, The Lutheran Observer, The Sunday School Times, The Herald and Presbyter of Chicago; The Baptist Chronicle (later The Examiner and Chronicle) of New York; The America Messenger, and Child's Paper of the American Tract Society, the papers of the Sunday School Union, of the Presbyterian Board, of the Methodist Book Concern, of the National Temperance Society, and others.

She availed herself also of the columns of many of the literary magazines, such as were governed by a religious spirit and meant for the home, among which were: Arthur's Home Magazine, Peterson's Magazine, The Ladies' Repository, The Mother's Magazine, The Mother's Journal, The Ladies' Home Journal, and others. Among the farming journals were: The New England Farmer, The Ohio Farmer, the Indiana Farmer, The Maine Farmer, The Rural New Yorker, The Cultivator and Country Gentleman, The Western Rural, The Working Farmer, The Farmer's Journal, The Tribune and Farmer, The Farm and fireside, The Farmer's Union, The Rural Home, The Country Side, and The Farm and Garden, of the Household Department, of which she had charge at the time of her death. She also wrote for a few juvenile magazines and papers, Among them being: The Schoolday Visitor, The Schoolday Magazine, The School World, The Little Corporal, The Little Gem, The Minor, The Young Folks' Magazine, Our Young People, The Children's Home, The Children's Friend, Golden Hours, Golden Rule, Home Companion, Christian Giver, Mersey's Museum, beside many others to which she was an occasional contributor.

The number of articles she contributed to the press was not less than 8,000, and the papers and periodicals to which she contributed number over 75. In addition, she wrote fourteen books all for the young. The titles of these are: Archie at the Seaside, Hours with my Picture Book, Minnie's Thinking Cap, How to be Beautiful, The Little Box and its Travels, Respect the Burden, The Prize Bible and other Stories, One Hundred Gold Dollars, The Hard Master, Hanna's Lesson, Clarence, The Fire-fighters, and Capital for Working Boys.

== Later life and death ==
In the latter years of her life, when her own sons began to be young men, she took great interest in the welfare of that class, and turned her aim in writing largely toward them. For this purpose, she used such class journals as would devote a column or two reading suitable for clerks, and for several years, up to the time of her death, she furnished weekly an article for the Clerk's Department of The American Grocer.

After Jennie Maria Drinkwater Conklin conceived the idea of the "Shut-in-Band", McConaughy, though sorely smitten by the painful malady that resulted in her death, became a corresponding member, and wrote numerous letters to the suffering invalids, to cheer and brighten their lives. After McConaughy's death, there were found the addresses of 44 invalids to whom she wrote, all strangers to her personally, and scattered all over the country.

Her final illness dated from June 23, 1885, but she had been suffering for seven years. The disease of which she died began to develop about 20 years earlier, and several operations were performed at various times which prolonged her life. She died at her home in Somerville, New Jersey, on August 29, 1885. She was interred in the Somerville Cemetery.

== Selected works ==
- Hours with my Picture Book (American Sunday-School Union, 1865)
- Archie at the Seaside, and Other Stories (American Sunday-School Union, 1866)
- Minnie's Thinking Cap (American Sunday-School Union, 1866)
- Clarence; or, self-will and principle (Philadelphia, Perkinpine & Higgins, 1866)
- One Hundred Gold Dollars (Philadelphia, J. C. Garrigues & Co., 1867)
- The Hard Master: A Temperence Story (National Temperance Society and Publication House, 1868)
- The Fire-fighters (National Temperance Society and Publication House, 1872)
- Capital for Working Boys (London, Hodder and Stoughton, 1884)
- How to be Beautiful
- The Little Box and its Travels
- Respect the Burden
- The Prize Bible and other Stories
- Hanna's Lesson

=== Model dialogues ===
- "Two Ways of Doing Good"
- "Genteel and Polite"
