= Charles Sitgreaves =

American politician (1803–1878)

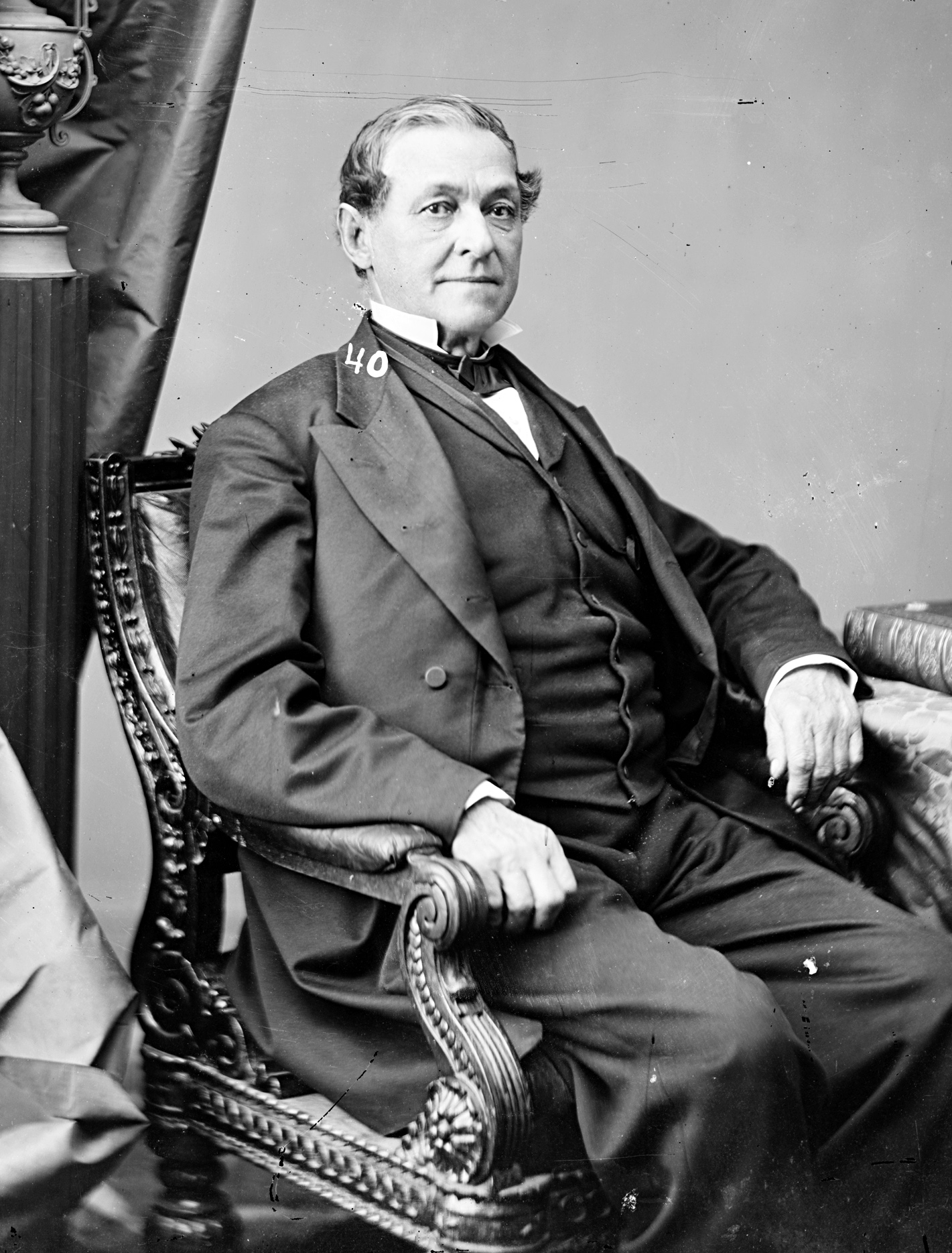
- Mathew Brady Collection, Library of Congress

Member of the U.S. House of Representatives from New Jersey's 3rd district
- In office March 4, 1865 – March 3, 1869
- Preceded by: William G. Steele
- Succeeded by: John T. Bird

1st mayor of Phillipsburg, New Jersey
- In office 1861–1862
- Preceded by: Office Established

Member of the New Jersey Senate
- In office 1851–1854

Personal details
- Born: April 22, 1803 Easton, Pennsylvania, U.S.
- Died: March 17, 1878 (aged 74) Phillipsburg, New Jersey, U.S.
- Party: Democratic
- Profession: Politician

Charles Sitgreaves (April 22, 1803, in Easton, Pennsylvania – March 17, 1878, in Phillipsburg, New Jersey) was an American Democratic Party politician who represented New Jersey's 3rd congressional district for two terms from 1865 to 1869.

== Early life and education ==
Sitgreaves was born in Easton, Pennsylvania on April 22, 1803, and moved with his parents to New Jersey in 1806. He pursued classical studies. He studied law; was admitted to the bar in 1824 and commenced practice in Phillipsburg, New Jersey.

== Career ==
He was member of the New Jersey General Assembly from 1831 to 1833 and the New Jersey Legislative Council from 1834 to 1835. He was a major commandant in the New Jersey militia from 1828 to 1838, and served in the New Jersey Senate from 1851 to 1854. He was president of the Belvidere and Delaware River Railway. Sitgreaves served as the Mayor of Phillipsburg, New Jersey in 1861 and 1862, and was president of the National Bank of Phillipsburg from 1856 to 1878.

=== Congress ===
Sitgreaves was elected as a Democrat to the Thirty-ninth Congress and Fortieth Congress, and served in office from March 4, 1865 – March 3, 1869, and was not a candidate for renomination in 1868.

== Later career and death ==
After leaving Congress, he engaged in banking and railroading. He died in Phillipsburg on March 17, 1878, and was interred in Seventh Street Cemetery in Easton.

U.S. House of Representatives
Preceded by William G. Steele	Member of the U.S. House of Representatives from New Jersey's 3rd congressional district March 4, 1865 – March 3, 1869	Succeeded by John T. Bird
