= Raritan, New Jersey =

Borough in Somerset County, New Jersey, US

- Borough
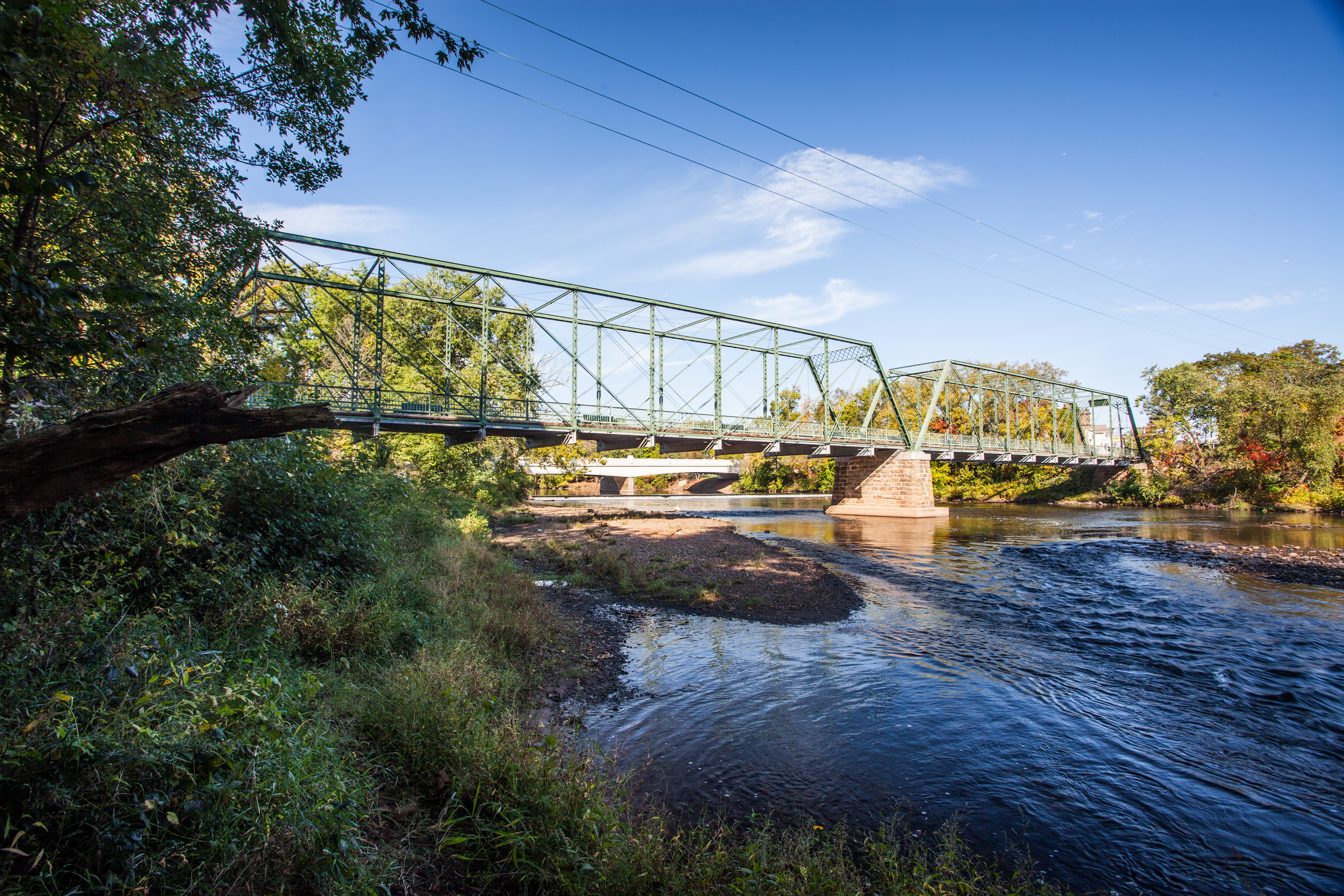
- Nevius Street Bridge

- Seal
- Motto: "A friendly town of friendly people"
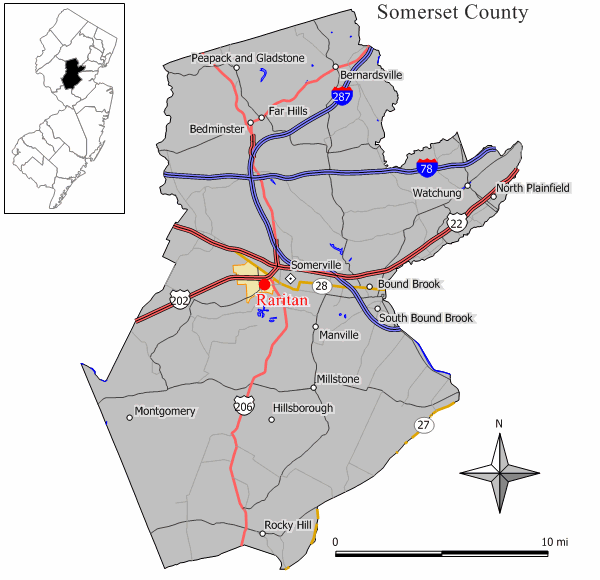
- Location of Raritan in Somerset County highlighted in yellow (right). Inset map: Location of Somerset County in New Jersey highlighted in black (left).

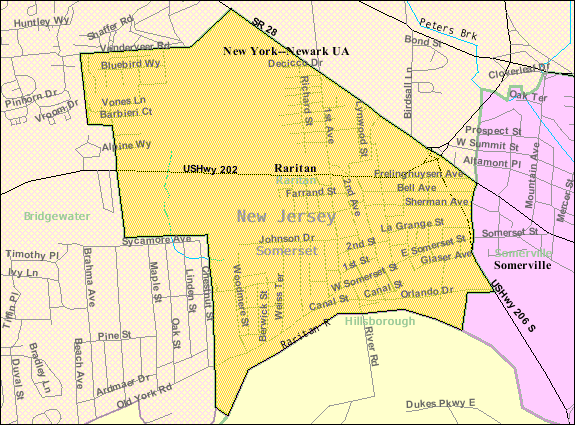
- Census Bureau map of Raritan, New Jersey

- Location in Somerset County Location in New Jersey Location in the United States
- Coordinates: 40.571344°N 74.646026°W
- Country: United States
- State: New Jersey
- County: Somerset
- Incorporated: April 3, 1868 (as town)
- Reincorporated: May 12, 1948 (as borough)
- Named for: Raritan tribe

Government
  - Type: Borough
  - Body: Borough Council
  - Mayor: Nicolas Carra (R, term ends December 31, 2027)
  - Administrator: Eric M. Colvin
  - Municipal clerk: Eric M. Colvin

Area
  - Total: 2.03 sq mi (5.27 km^{2})
  - Land: 1.99 sq mi (5.16 km^{2})
  - Water: 0.042 sq mi (0.11 km^{2}) 2.02%
  - Rank: 412th of 565 in state 17th of 21 in county
- Elevation: 125 ft (38 m)

Population (2020)
  - Total: 7,835
  - Estimate (2024): 8,584
  - Rank: 297th of 565 in state 14th of 21 in county
  - Density: 3,933.2/sq mi (1,518.6/km^{2})
  - Rank: 163rd of 565 in state 6th of 21 in county
- Time zone: UTC−05:00 (Eastern (EST))
  - Summer (DST): UTC−04:00 (Eastern (EDT))
- ZIP Codes: 08869
- Area code: 908
- FIPS code: 3403561980
- GNIS feature ID: 0885365
- Website: www.raritanboro.org

Raritan is a borough in Somerset County, in the U.S. state of New Jersey. As of the 2020 United States census, the borough's population was 7,835, its highest decennial census count ever and an increase of 954 (+13.9%) from the 2010 census count of 6,881, which in turn had reflected an increase of 543 (+8.6%) from the 6,338 counted at the 2000 census.

The borough's name is derived from the Raritans, a Native American group of Lenape. The name of the tribe is said to mean "forked river", "stream overflows", or "point on a tidal river".

== History ==
Raritan was originally established as a subdivision within Bridgewater Township by an act of the New Jersey Legislature on April 3, 1868. Despite its size, the town has an extensive history, that encompasses local, national, and even global history.

=== Raritan Woolen Mills ===
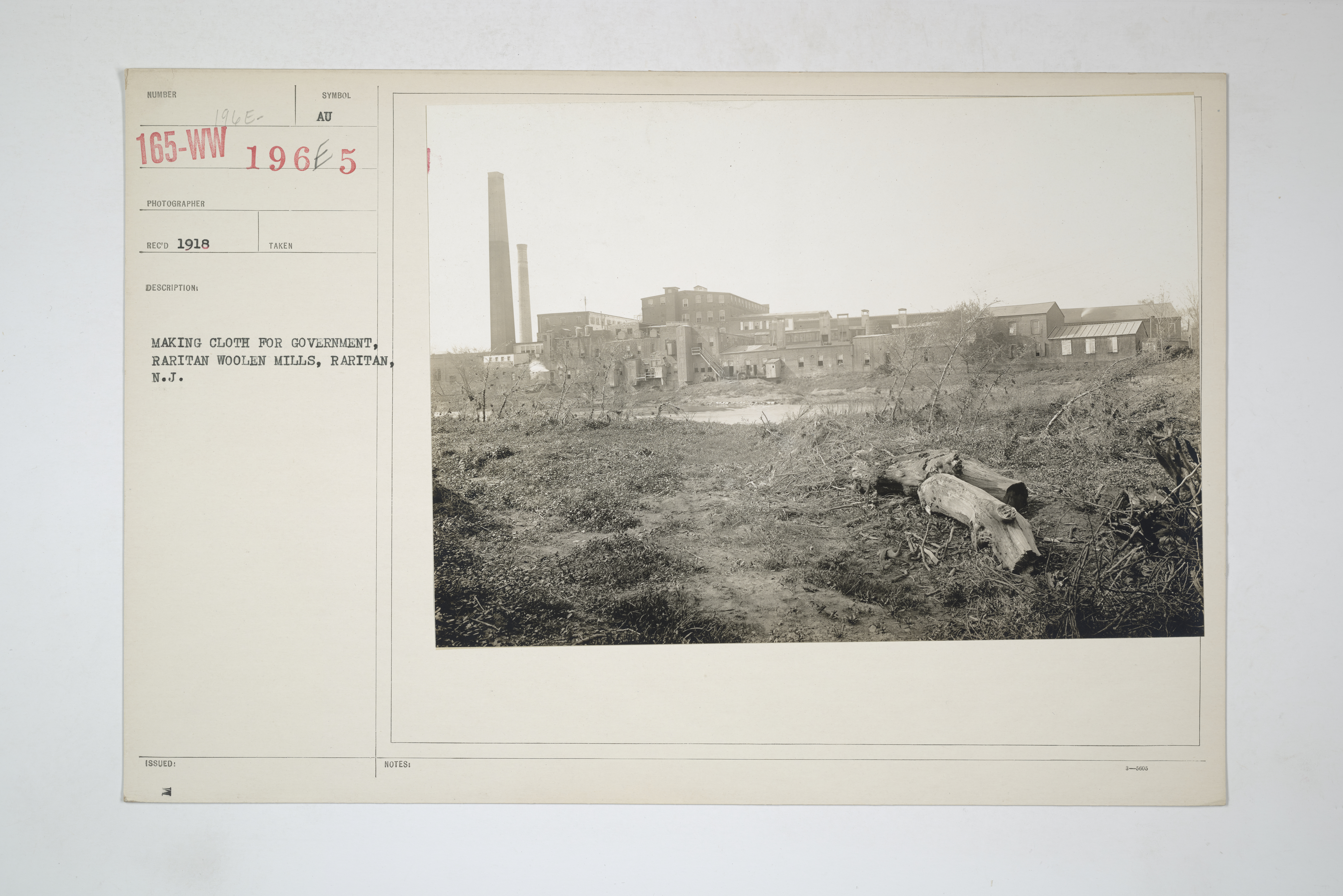
The Rariten Woolen Mills, pictured 1918 during the tail-end of WWI

The town's location on the Raritan River, a major artery for the use of trading goods into New York City, contributed it in being a bustling mill town during the 19th and early 20th centuries. The Raritan Woolen Mills was established in 1846, as a major producer of textiles, known throughout the United States. Its name changed to the Somerset Manufacturing Company in 1882, employing as many as 400 people during its peak at the turn of the century. The mill created uniforms and blankets for the Union Army during the Civil War, along with uniforms for the United States Army during World War I.

=== End of World War I ===
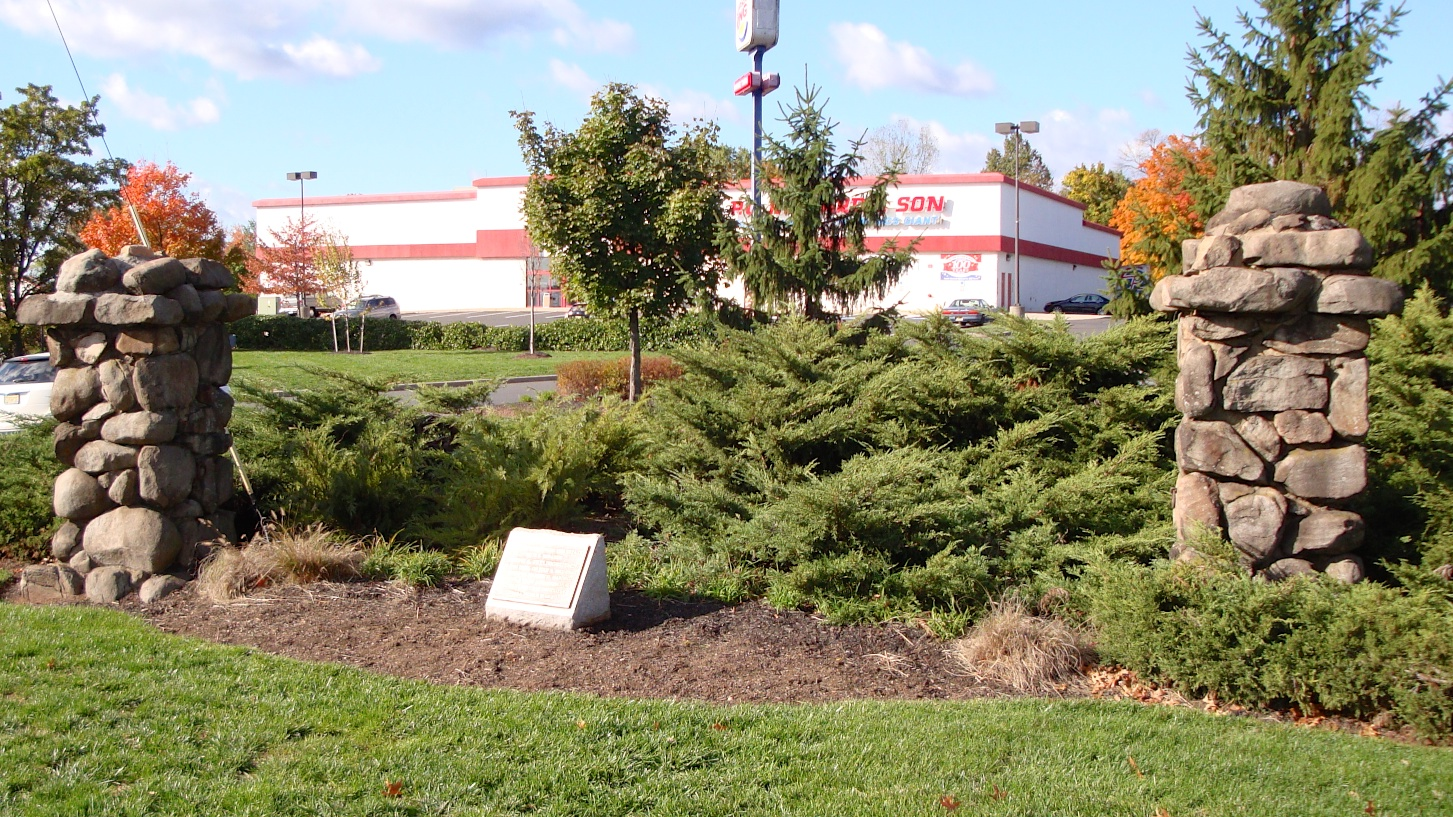
Memorial plaque marking the Frelinghuysen estate site and signing of the Knox–Porter Resolution on July 2, 1921

The Knox–Porter Resolution ending United States involvement in World War I was signed by President Harding at the estate of New Jersey Senator Joseph S. Frelinghuysen Sr. on July 2, 1921. That Memorial plaque marking of the Frelinghuysen estate is located in the borough.

=== Creation of the borough ===
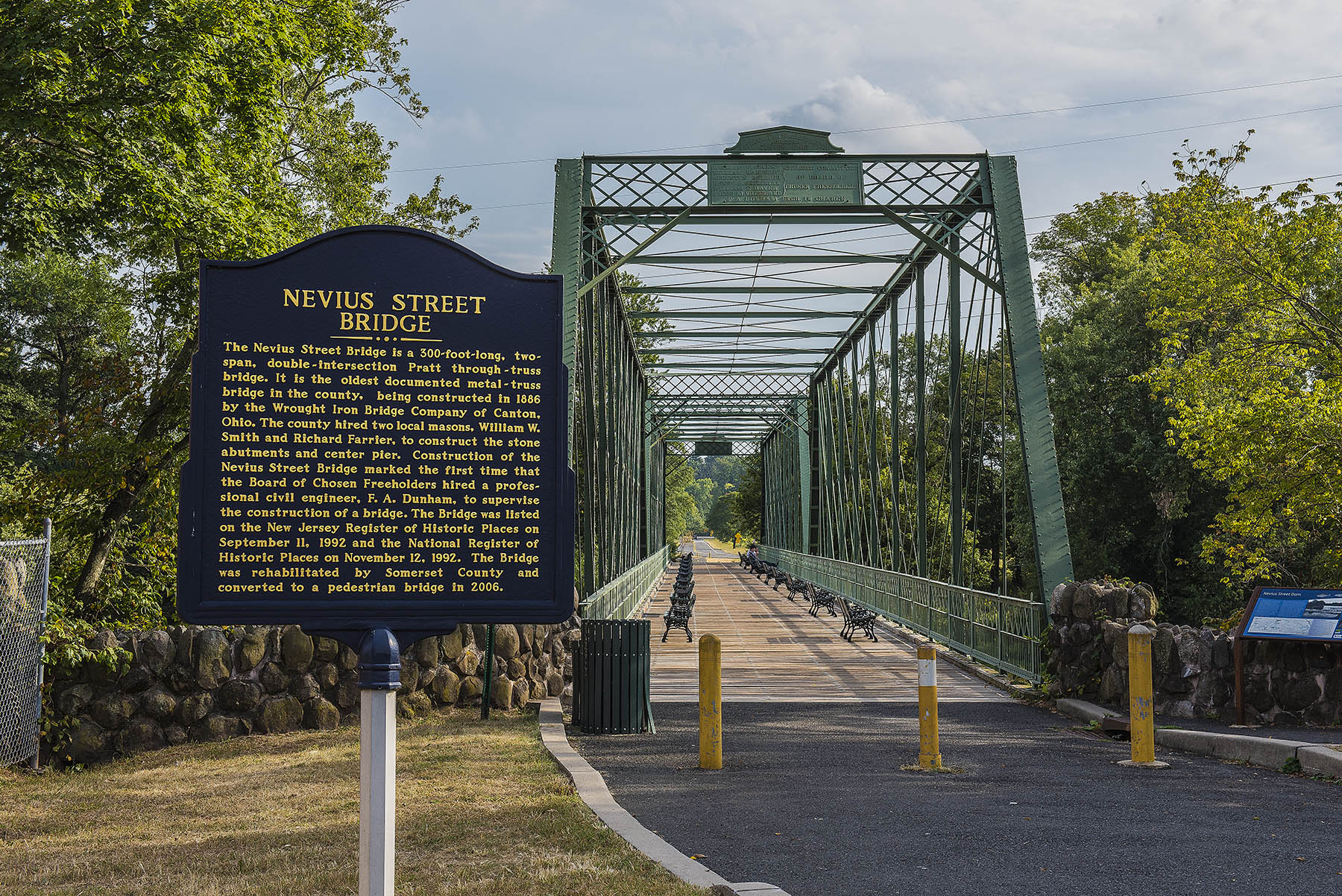
The Nevius Street Bridge was completed in 1886 by the Wrought Iron Bridge Company, it is still utilized by pedestrians crossing the river today

After a series of bitter lawsuits between Raritan and Bridgewater in the 1930s and 1940s, the Legislature allowed Raritan to become a fully independent borough by an Act on May 12, 1948, based on the results of a referendum passed on June 12, 1948. The new borough incorporated the old town and an additional portion of Bridgewater Township.

== Geography ==
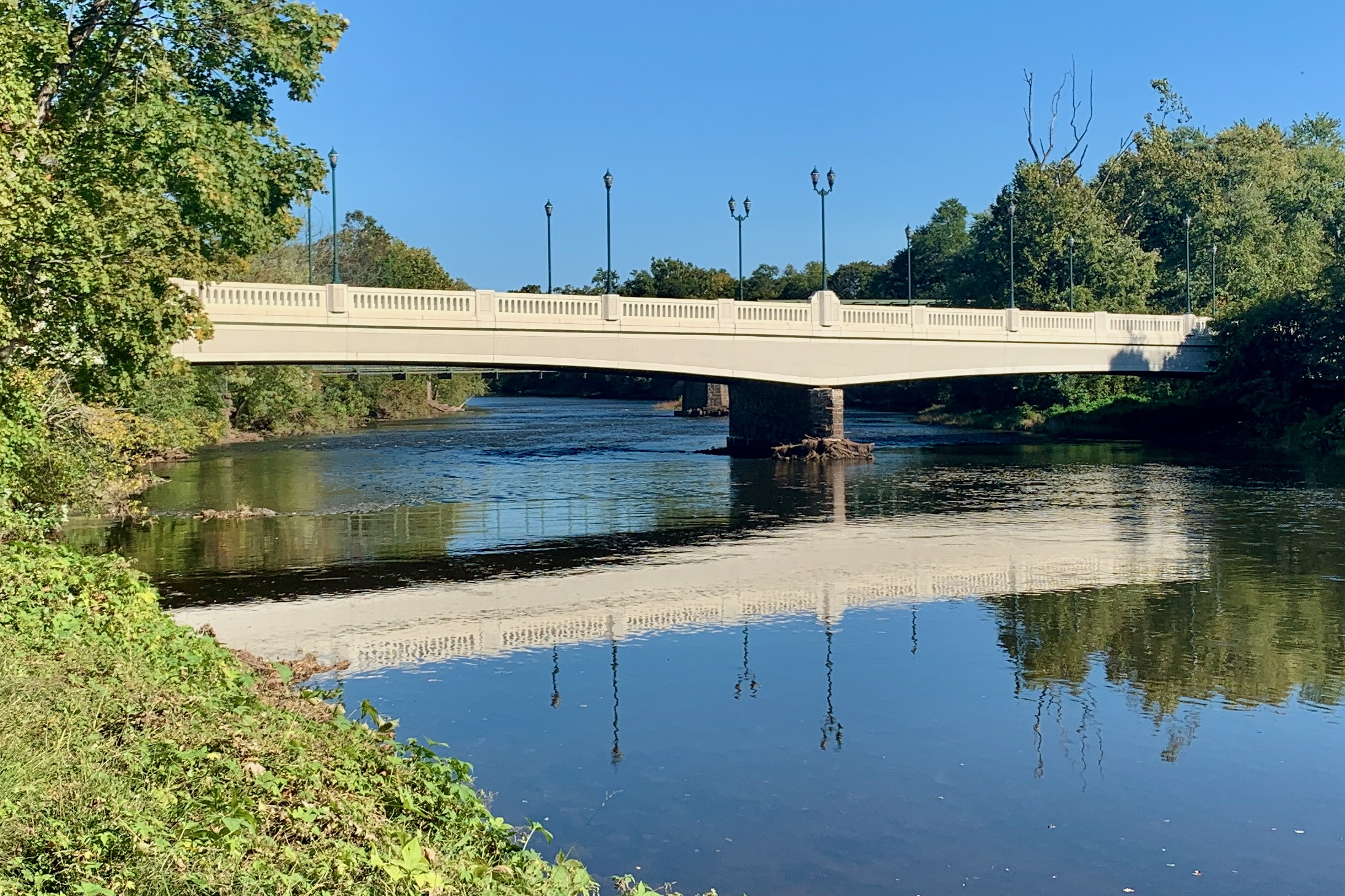
The John Basilone Veterans Memorial Bridge is for cars crossing the river

According to the United States Census Bureau, the borough had a total area of 2.03 square miles (5.27 km^{2}), including 1.99 square miles (5.16 km^{2}) of land and 0.04 square miles (0.11 km^{2}) of water (2.02%).

The borough borders the Somerset County municipalities of Bridgewater Township, Hillsborough Township, and Somerville. Raritan is in the western division of the Raritan Valley region (a line of municipalities in central New Jersey), along with Branchburg and Bridgewater.

== Demographics ==
Historical population
Census	Pop.	Note	%±
1870	1,009		—
1880	2,046		102.8%
1890	2,556		24.9%
1900	3,244		26.9%
1910	3,672		13.2%
1920	4,457		21.4%
1930	4,751		6.6%
1940	4,839		1.9%
1950	5,131		6.0%
1960	6,137		19.6%
1970	6,691		9.0%
1980	6,128		−8.4%
1990	5,798		−5.4%
2000	6,338		9.3%
2010	6,881		8.6%
2020	7,835		13.9%
2024 (est.)	8,584	▲	9.6%
Population sources: 1870–1920 1870 1880–1890; 1890–1910 1910–1930; 1940–2000 2000; 2010 2020

=== 2020 census ===
As of the 2020 census, Raritan had a population of 7,835. The median age was 39.3 years. 20.4% of residents were under the age of 18 and 14.3% of residents were 65 years of age or older. For every 100 females there were 100.0 males, and for every 100 females age 18 and over there were 97.5 males age 18 and over.

100.0% of residents lived in urban areas, while 0.0% lived in rural areas.

There were 2,993 households in Raritan, of which 31.6% had children under the age of 18 living in them. Of all households, 50.2% were married-couple households, 19.3% were households with a male householder and no spouse or partner present, and 24.7% were households with a female householder and no spouse or partner present. About 25.7% of all households were made up of individuals and 9.2% had someone living alone who was 65 years of age or older.

There were 3,167 housing units, of which 5.5% were vacant. The homeowner vacancy rate was 1.3% and the rental vacancy rate was 4.6%.

Racial composition as of the 2020 census
Race	Number	Percent
White	4,502	57.5%
Black or African American	267	3.4%
American Indian and Alaska Native	24	0.3%
Asian	1,563	19.9%
Native Hawaiian and Other Pacific Islander	1	0.0%
Some other race	687	8.8%
Two or more races	791	10.1%
Hispanic or Latino (of any race)	1,672	21.3%

=== 2010 census ===
The 2010 United States census counted 6,881 people, 2,673 households, and 1,748 families in the borough. The population density was 3,452.2 per square mile (1,332.9/km^{2}). There were 2,847 housing units at an average density of 1,428.3 per square mile (551.5/km^{2}). The racial makeup was 76.40% (5,257) White, 2.09% (144) Black or African American, 0.16% (11) Native American, 14.29% (983) Asian, 0.01% (1) Pacific Islander, 4.59% (316) from other races, and 2.46% (169) from two or more races. Hispanic or Latino of any race were 16.39% (1,128) of the population.

Of the 2,673 households, 31.2% had children under the age of 18; 48.5% were married couples living together; 11.2% had a female householder with no husband present and 34.6% were non-families. Of all households, 27.8% were made up of individuals and 10.3% had someone living alone who was 65 years of age or older. The average household size was 2.57 and the average family size was 3.16.

23.1% of the population were under the age of 18, 7.3% from 18 to 24, 28.2% from 25 to 44, 27.8% from 45 to 64, and 13.6% who were 65 years of age or older. The median age was 40.1 years. For every 100 females, the population had 96.1 males. For every 100 females ages 18 and older there were 95.1 males.

The Census Bureau's 2006–2010 American Community Survey showed that (in 2010 inflation-adjusted dollars) median household income was $70,116 (with a margin of error of +/− $10,294) and the median family income was $79,813 (+/− $8,715). Males had a median income of $54,130 (+/− $7,617) versus $44,125 (+/− $12,260) for females. The per capita income for the borough was $34,617 (+/− $5,703). About 6.3% of families and 7.4% of the population were below the poverty line, including 15.4% of those under age 18 and 3.5% of those age 65 or over.

=== 2000 census ===
As of the 2000 United States census there were 6,338 people, 2,556 households, and 1,671 families residing in the borough. The population density was 3,113.8 inhabitants per square mile (1,202.2/km^{2}). There were 2,644 housing units at an average density of 1,299.0 per square mile (501.5/km^{2}). The racial makeup of the borough was 87.74% White, 0.93% African American, 0.08% Native American, 8.17% Asian, 0.16% Pacific Islander, 1.64% from other races, and 1.28% from two or more races. Hispanic or Latino of any race were 8.41% of the population.

There were 2,556 households, out of which 30.1% had children under the age of 18 living with them, 51.0% were married couples living together, 10.0% had a female householder with no husband present, and 34.6% were non-families. 29.0% of all households were made up of individuals, and 11.9% had someone living alone who was 65 years of age or older. The average household size was 2.48 and the average family size was 3.08.

In the borough, the population was spread out, with 22.3% under the age of 18, 6.5% from 18 to 24, 35.0% from 25 to 44, 20.0% from 45 to 64, and 16.2% who were 65 years of age or older. The median age was 38 years. For every 100 females, there were 92.3 males. For every 100 females age 18 and over, there were 91.1 males.

The median income for a household in the borough was $51,122, and the median income for a family was $59,962. Males had a median income of $46,071 versus $35,704 for females. The per capita income for the borough was $26,420. About 5.5% of families and 6.4% of the population were below the poverty line, including 6.0% of those under age 18 and 12.8% of those age 65 or over.

== Parks and recreation ==
Frelinghuysen Park is a public park dedicated to General John Frederick Frelinghuysen. This is one of the public parks in Raritan, along with Basilone Park and Elizabeth Avenue Park, and it includes two little league baseball fields, two full-sized outdoor basketball courts, two full sized tennis courts and a playground. During the summer months Frelinghuysen Park and Basilone Park have recreational pools open to children. The parks offers tables for picnicking. It is located at the end of Sherman Avenue before getting onto Highway 206.

== Government ==
=== Local government ===
Raritan is governed under the borough form of New Jersey municipal government, which is used in 218 municipalities (of the 564) statewide, making it the most common form of government in New Jersey. The governing body is comprised of the mayor and the borough council, with all positions elected at-large on a partisan basis as part of the November general election. The mayor is elected directly by the voters to a four-year term of office. The borough council includes six members elected to serve three-year terms on a staggered basis, with two seats coming up for election each year in a three-year cycle. The borough form of government used by Raritan is a "weak mayor / strong council" government in which council members act as the legislative body with the mayor presiding at meetings and voting only in the event of a tie. The mayor can veto ordinances subject to an override by a two-thirds majority vote of the council. The mayor makes committee and liaison assignments for council members, and most appointments are made by the mayor with the advice and consent of the council.

As of 2025, the mayor of the Borough of Raritan is Republican Nicolas Carra, whose term of office expires December 31, 2027. Members of the Raritan Borough Council are Council President Donald Tozzi (R, 2026), Michael Patente (R, 2026), Umesh Agrawal (R, 2025), Adam Armahizer (D, 2025), Kenneth DiGraziano (R, 2027) and David Fritzinger (R, 2027).

In January 2024, the borough council appointed Republican Umesh Agrawal to fill the seat expiring in December 2025 that became vacant when Nicolas J. Carra took office as mayor earlier that month; Agrawal served on an interim basis until the November 2024 general election in which he won his election to serve the remainder of Carra's term.

In May 2024, the borough council appointed Republican Kenneth DiGraziano to fill the seat expiring in December 2024 that became vacant when Joyce Melitsky resigned earlier that month; DiGraziano served on an interim basis until the November 2024 general election in which he won his election to serve a full three-year term.

Rocco Miele was Raritan's first mayor, serving from its founding in 1948 to 1953.

=== Federal, state and county representation ===
Raritan is located in the 7th Congressional District and is part of New Jersey's 23rd state legislative district.

For the 119th United States Congress, New Jersey's 7th congressional district is represented by Thomas Kean Jr. (R, Westfield). New Jersey is represented in the United States Senate by Democrats Cory Booker (Newark, term ends 2027) and Andy Kim (Moorestown, term ends 2031).

For the 2026–2027 session, the 23rd legislative district of the New Jersey Legislature is represented in the State Senate by Doug Steinhardt (R, Lopatcong Township) and in the General Assembly by John DiMaio (R, Hackettstown) and Erik Peterson (R, Franklin Township).

Somerset County is governed by a five-member Board of County Commissioners, whose members are elected at-large to three-year terms of office on a staggered basis, with one or two seats coming up for election each year. At an annual reorganization meeting held in the first week of January, the board selects a Director and deputy director from among its members. As of 2025, Somerset County's County Commissioners are Director Shanel Robinson (D, Franklin Township, term as commissioner ends 2027; term as director ends 2026), Deputy Director Paul Drake (D, Hillsborough Township, term as commissioner and as deputy director ends 2026), Melonie Marano (D, Green Brook Township, 2028), Elizabeth Graner (D, Bernards Township, 2026; elected to serve an unexpired term) and Sara Sooy (D, Bedminster Township, 2027).

Constitutional officers, elected on a countywide basis are Clerk Steve Peter (D, Somerville, 2027), Sheriff Darrin Russo (D, Franklin Township, 2028) and Surrogate Bernice "Tina" Jalloh (D, Franklin Township, 2030).

=== Politics ===
United States presidential election results for Raritan
Year	Republican		Democratic		Third party(ies)	
Year	No.	%	No.	%	No.	%
2024	1,865	49.65%	1,835	48.86%	56	1.49%
2020	1,712	45.41%	1,985	52.65%	73	1.94%
2016	1,500	47.13%	1,559	48.98%	124	3.90%
2012	1,360	50.04%	1,323	48.68%	35	1.29%
2008	1,514	53.25%	1,287	45.27%	42	1.48%
2004	1,497	54.06%	1,239	44.75%	33	1.19%
2000	1,005	46.94%	1,065	49.74%	71	3.32%

As of March 2011, there were a total of 3,926 registered voters in Raritan, of which 1,122 (28.6% vs. 26.0% countywide) were registered as Democrats, 882 (22.5% vs. 25.7%) were registered as Republicans and 1,917 (48.8% vs. 48.2%) were registered as Unaffiliated. There were 5 voters registered as Libertarians or Greens. Among the borough's 2010 Census population, 57.1% (vs. 60.4% in Somerset County) were registered to vote, including 74.2% of those ages 18 and over (vs. 80.4% countywide).

In the 2012 presidential election, Republican Mitt Romney received 50.0% of the vote (1,360 cast), ahead of Democrat Barack Obama with 48.7% (1,323 votes), and other candidates with 1.3% (35 votes), among the 2,759 ballots cast by the borough's 4,159 registered voters (41 ballots were spoiled), for a turnout of 66.3%. In the 2008 presidential election, Republican John McCain received 1,514 votes (52.6% vs. 46.1% countywide), ahead of Democrat Barack Obama with 1,287 votes (44.7% vs. 52.1%) and other candidates with 42 votes (1.5% vs. 1.1%), among the 2,879 ballots cast by the borough's 3,830 registered voters, for a turnout of 75.2% (vs. 78.7% in Somerset County). In the 2004 presidential election, Republican George W. Bush received 1,497 votes (53.4% vs. 51.5% countywide), ahead of Democrat John Kerry with 1,239 votes (44.2% vs. 47.2%) and other candidates with 33 votes (1.2% vs. 0.9%), among the 2,802 ballots cast by the borough's 3,606 registered voters, for a turnout of 77.7% (vs. 81.7% in the whole county).

Gubernatorial election results for Raritan
Year	Republican		Democratic		Third party(ies)	
Year	No.	%	No.	%	No.	%
2025	1,391	47.09%	1,543	52.23%	20	0.68%
2021	1,382	57.11%	1,016	41.98%	22	0.91%
2017	972	54.06%	776	43.16%	50	2.78%
2013	1,249	72.03%	451	26.01%	34	1.96%
2009	1,292	62.18%	562	27.05%	224	10.78%
2005	944	49.71%	852	44.87%	103	5.42%

In the 2013 gubernatorial election, Republican Chris Christie received 72.0% of the vote (1,249 cast), ahead of Democrat Barbara Buono with 26.0% (451 votes), and other candidates with 2.0% (34 votes), among the 1,759 ballots cast by the borough's 4,253 registered voters (25 ballots were spoiled), for a turnout of 41.4%. In the 2009 gubernatorial election, Republican Chris Christie received 1,292 votes (60.9% vs. 55.8% countywide), ahead of Democrat Jon Corzine with 562 votes (26.5% vs. 34.1%), Independent Chris Daggett with 202 votes (9.5% vs. 8.7%) and other candidates with 22 votes (1.0% vs. 0.7%), among the 2,120 ballots cast by the borough's 3,948 registered voters, yielding a 53.7% turnout (vs. 52.5% in the county).

United States Senate election results for Raritan1
Year	Republican		Democratic		Third party(ies)	
Year	No.	%	No.	%	No.	%
2024	1,725	47.90%	1,792	49.76%	84	2.33%
2018	1,328	50.55%	1,196	45.53%	103	3.92%
2012	1,230	47.88%	1,283	49.94%	56	2.18%
2006	1,018	54.15%	777	41.33%	85	4.52%

United States Senate election results for Raritan2
Year	Republican		Democratic		Third party(ies)	
Year	No.	%	No.	%	No.	%
2020	1,724	46.54%	1,923	51.92%	57	1.54%
2014	769	51.58%	682	45.74%	40	2.68%
2013	571	58.44%	397	40.63%	9	0.92%
2008	1,373	52.65%	1,176	45.09%	59	2.26%

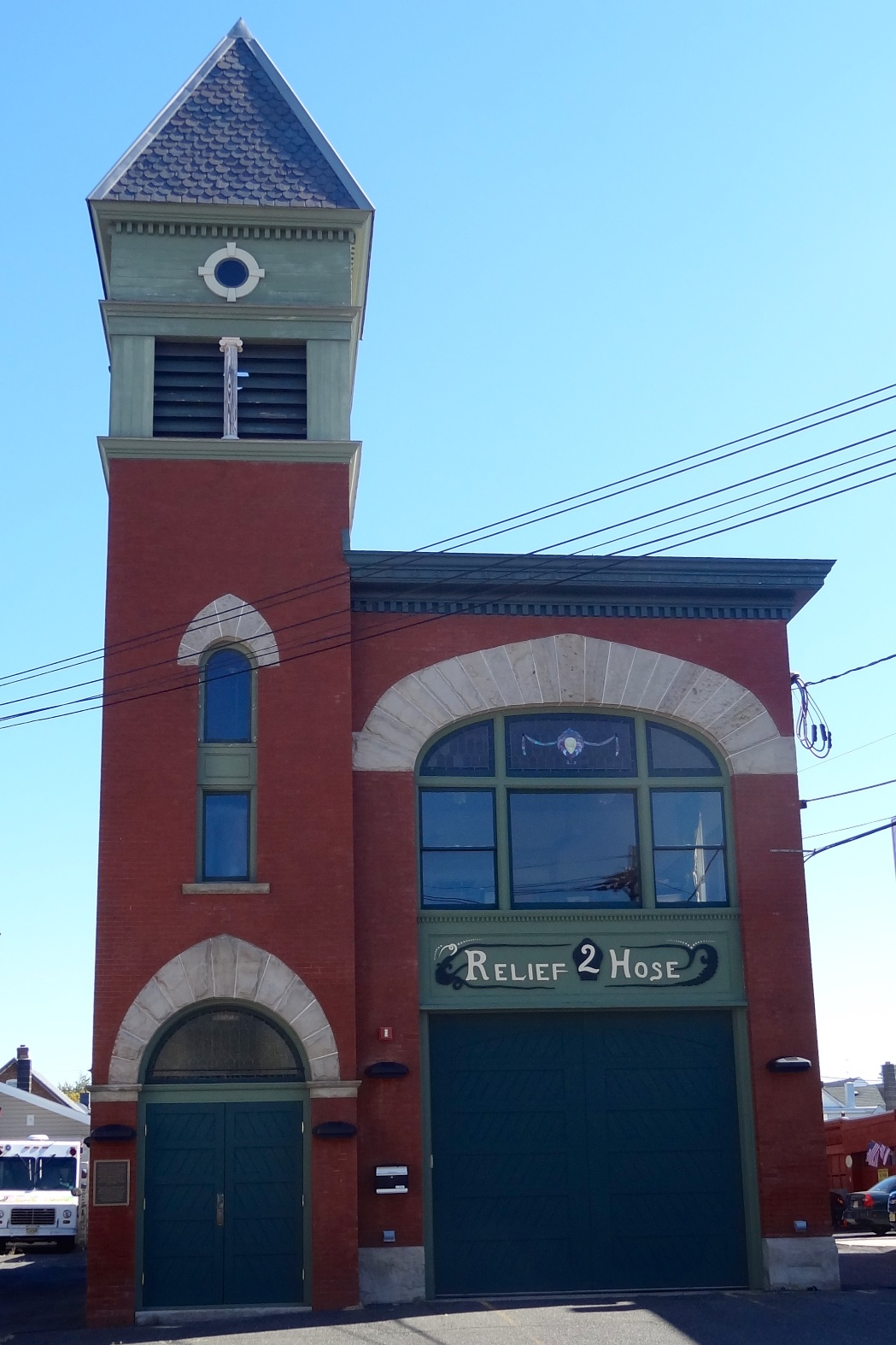
The Raritan Relief Hose Company No. 2 Fire Engine House is on both the New Jersey Register of Historic Places and the U.S. National Register of Historic Places.

== Education ==
Students from Raritan attend the Bridgewater-Raritan Regional School District, together with students from Bridgewater Township. As of the 2020–21 school year, the district, comprised of 11 schools, had an enrollment of 8,254 students and 754.4 classroom teachers (on an FTE basis), for a student–teacher ratio of 10.9:1. One of the largest suburban districts statewide, the district is the largest in Somerset County. Schools in the district (with 2020–21 enrollment data from the National Center for Education Statistics) are Adamsville Primary School (532 students; in grades PreK–4), Bradley Gardens Primary School (263; PreK–4), Crim Primary School (342; K–4), Hamilton Primary School (477; K–4), John F. Kennedy Primary School (427; K–4), Milltown Primary School (402; PreK–4), Van Holten Primary School (334; K–4), Eisenhower Intermediate School (704; 5–6), Hillside Intermediate School (574; 5–6), Bridgewater–Raritan Middle School (1,384; 7–8) and Bridgewater–Raritan High School (2,747; 9–12). The overwhelming majority of students in the district are from Bridgewater, with approximately 1,000 students from Raritan. All schools in the district are in Bridgewater except for Kennedy, which is in Raritan.

During the 1999–2000 school year, Bridgewater-Raritan High School was recognized with the National Blue Ribbon School Award of Excellence by the United States Department of Education, the highest award an American school can receive from the federal government.

Public high school students also have the option to attend the Somerset County Vocational and Technical High School, a four-year magnet school located in Bridgewater that provides occupational and academic training to students from all of Somerset County.

St. Ann Classical Academy is a classical, liberal-arts Catholic school for students in pre-kindergarten through eighth grade that operates under the supervision of the Raritan Oratory of St. Philip Neri and the Roman Catholic Diocese of Metuchen.

== Transportation ==
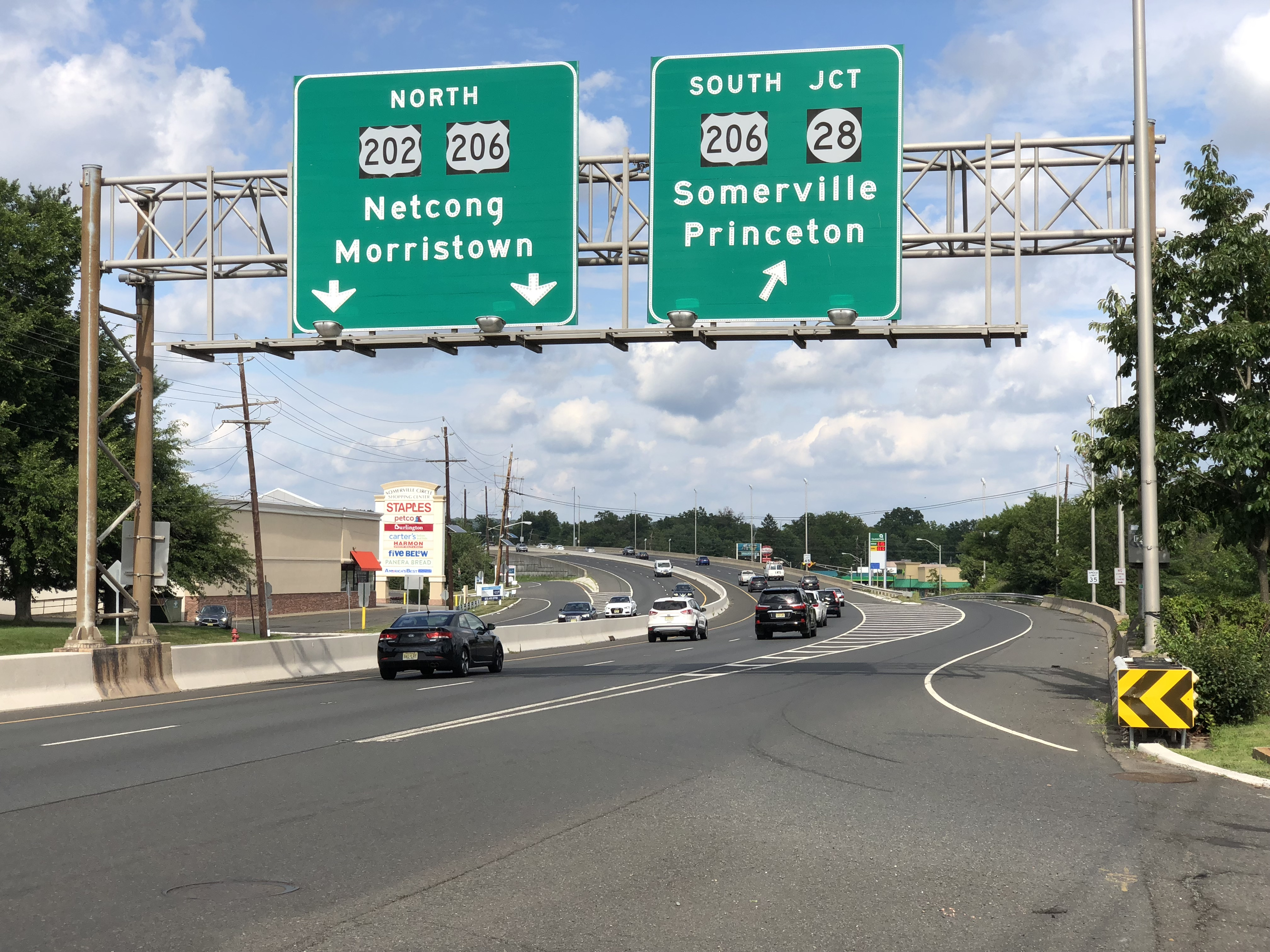
U.S. Route 202 northbound at its junction with U.S. Route 206 and Route 28 at the Somerville Circle in Raritan

=== Roads and highways ===
As of May 2010, the borough had a total of 24.34 miles (39.17 km) of roadways, of which 18.26 miles (29.39 km) were maintained by the municipality, 2.85 miles (4.59 km) by Somerset County and 3.23 miles (5.20 km) by the New Jersey Department of Transportation.

U.S. Route 202 traverses the borough from east to west. U.S. Route 206 follows the border with Somerville. New Jersey Route 28 has one side of the roadway within the borough as it follows the border with Bridgewater Township. The northern terminus of County Route 567 is in Raritan.

U.S. Routes 202 and 206 intersect with NJ Route 28 at the Somerville Circle on the borders with Bridgewater Township and Somerville, with the eastern half of the circle located in Raritan. As part of an ongoing effort to improve traffic safety at the circle, the New Jersey Department of Transportation has made a series of changes to the structure of the traffic circle, originally constructed during the 1930s. With the suburbanization of the area, the circle was handling an average of 70,000 vehicles each day. In 1994, an overpass was completed to allow traffic on Route 202 between Flemington and Interstate 78 and Interstate 287 to avoid the circle, though the rate of accidents grew from 195 in 1991 before the project started to 302 for the year after the overpass was open to traffic. After yield signs were added in February 1995, the accident rate increased again, to an annualized rate above 400 per year.

=== Public transportation ===
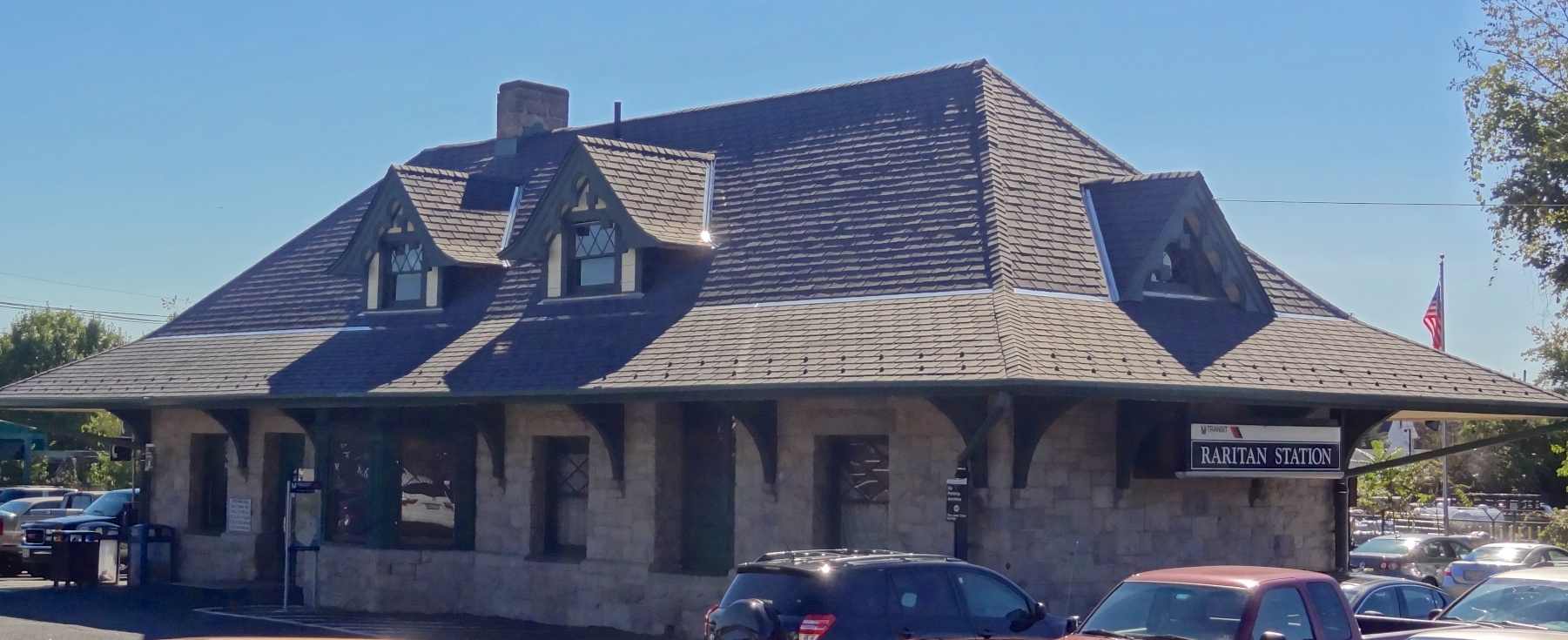
The Raritan train station is on the U.S. National Register of Historic Places.

The Raritan train station offers NJ Transit service on the Raritan Valley Line to Newark Penn Station. The station is north of the town center on Thompson Street. The station building is south of the tracks in the main parking lot and was built in the early 1890s. There are also three other small lots for this station. Raritan is usually the most frequent terminus of the Raritan Valley Line. There is limited service farther west to High Bridge.

The borough is served by the CAT-1R, 2R, and 3R routes (which all continue to Raritan Valley Community College on the western end. On the eastern end, buses continue to New Brunswick, North Plainfield, and Bridgewater Commons respectively), operated by Community Access Transit.

== Community ==
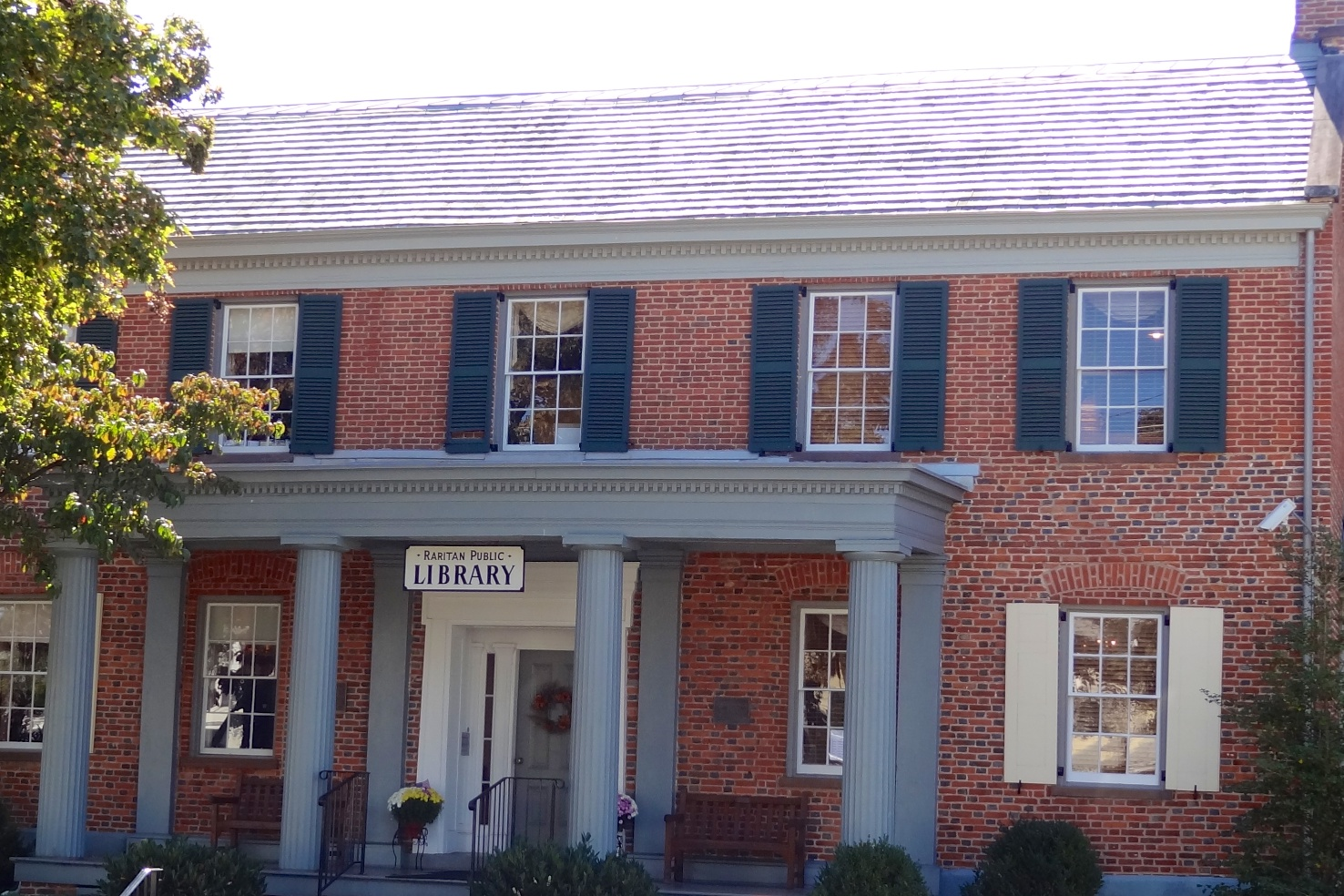
General John Frelinghuysen House, now the Raritan Public Library

The Raritan Public Library is located in what was originally the homestead of General John Frederick Frelinghuysen.

Raritan is the home of DeLucia's Brick Oven Pizza, a family-owned restaurant established in 1917 that has been called one of the best pizzerias in the United States.

== Notable people ==
People who were born in, residents of, or otherwise closely associated with Raritan include:

- John Basilone (1916–1945), awarded the Medal of Honor for his actions at the Battle of Guadalcanal
- Tony Bongiovi (born 1947), record producer and recording engineer
- Isaac Brokaw (1746–1826), clockmaker
- Nestor Cabrera (born 2003), professional soccer player who plays as a midfielder for New York Cosmos
- Ben Carnevale (1915–2008), basketball coach inducted into the Basketball Hall of Fame in 1970
- Jack Ciattarelli (born 1961), member of the New Jersey General Assembly who represented the 16th Legislative District from 2011 to 2018 and was the Republican nominee for governor of New Jersey in 2021 and 2025
- Joseph S. Frelinghuysen Sr. (1869–1948), U.S. Senator representing New Jersey
- Mike Grosso (born 1947), former professional basketball player who played in the American Basketball Association
- Terry Matalas (born 1975), screenwriter, grew up near Raritan
- Frank Perantoni (1923–1991), American football center who played professional football for the New York Yankees
- Elvira Woodruff (born 1951), children's writer known for books that include elements of fantasy and history
