= Somerville Circle =

Road intersection in Somerset County, New Jersey, U.S.

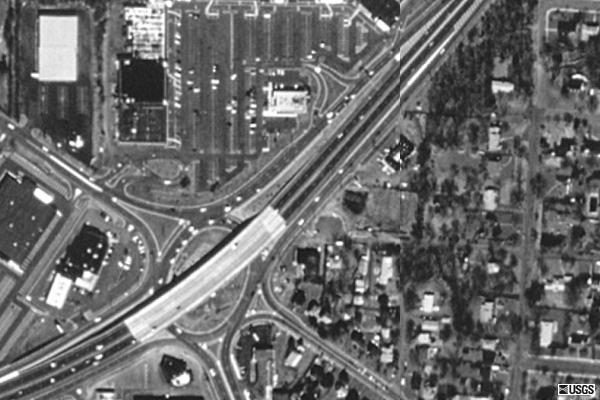
- The Somerville Circle
- Interactive map of Somerville Circle

Location
- Bridgewater Township – Raritan, New Jersey
- Coordinates: 40°34′32″N 74°37′44″W
- Roads at junction: US 202; US 206; Route 28

Construction
- Type: Traffic circle

The Somerville Circle is a traffic circle located on the border of Bridgewater Township and Raritan, in Somerset County, New Jersey in the United States. The circle lies at the intersection of U.S. Routes 202 and 206, and New Jersey Route 28. The circle was built in the 1930s when the area was rural, but as the region became more populated the circle became notorious for being confusing for drivers and a frequent spot for traffic accidents and traffic backups. In the 1990s, a bridge was built that allowed Route 202 to bypass the circle completely. The Somerville Circle is no longer officially considered a traffic circle by the New Jersey Department of Transportation.

== Description ==
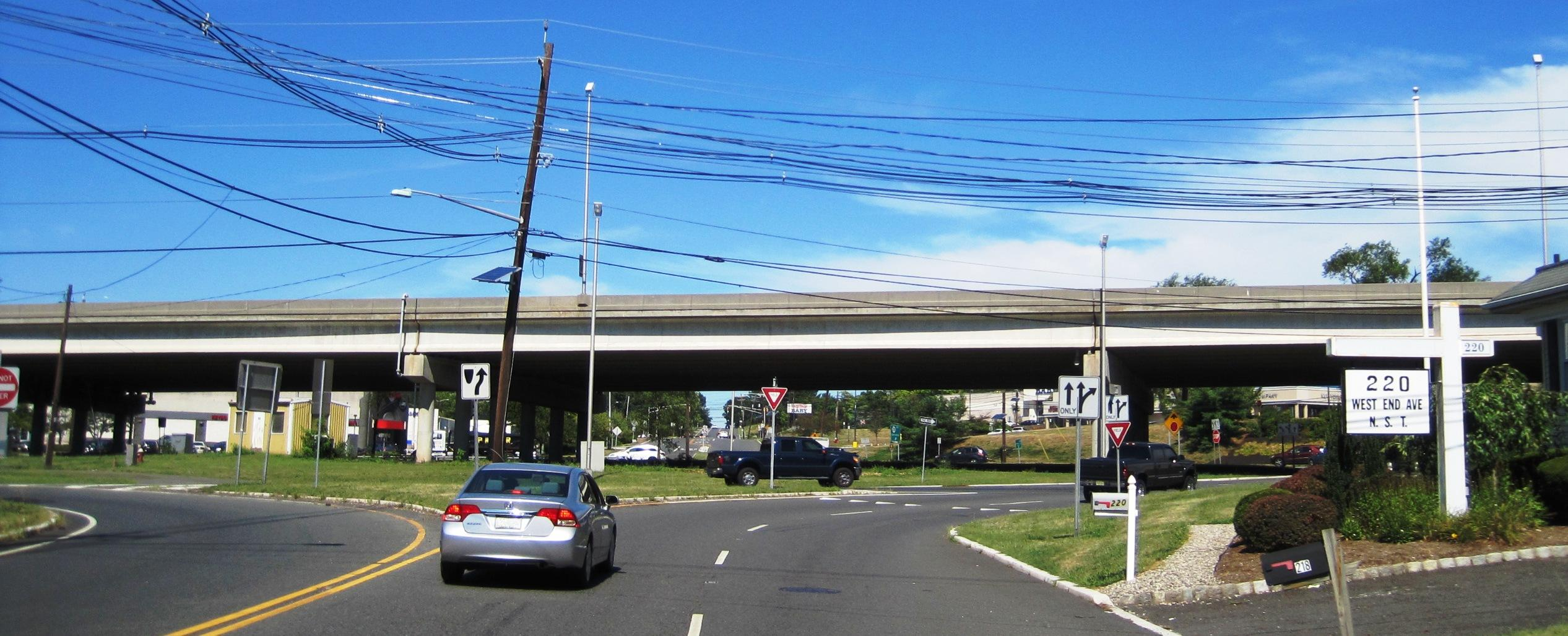
At-grade view of the circle looking west from Route 28, US 202 passes over the circle on the overpass

The Somerville Circle joins U.S. Routes 202 and 206, and New Jersey Route 28. A bridge over the circle allows Route 202 to bypass the intersecting roads. Ever since the bridge was built in the 1990s, the New Jersey Department of Transportation no longer considers the Somerville Circle a traffic circle, but the intersection still contains a 360 degree loop, interrupted on one side with traffic lights. According to the New Jersey Department of Transportation, the circle averages 11,786 vehicles a day.

The Somerville Circle is located on the border between Bridgewater Township and Raritan, New Jersey, just slightly northwest of Somerville. The border runs down Route 28 with Raritan having a slightly larger portion of the circle within its borders. The border bisecting the circle usually causes minor confusion when accidents are reported as drivers are often not sure what side of the border they are on and which town's police department has jurisdiction. More traffic accidents occur on the Raritan side of the circle than the Bridgewater side.

== History ==
In the late 1920s New Jersey was planning a series of highways to allow out of state traffic to bypass towns and called for counties in the state to build and maintain another series of roads for local traffic. Routes 202 and 206 were part of this plan and the design called for them to intersect west of Somerville at New Jersey Route 28. To improve traffic flow the intersection of the roads was turned into a traffic circle. The circle was built in the 1930s by the New Jersey Highway Department. The Somerville Circle was among many others built in New Jersey at the time, because the Highway Department believed that circles were an effective way to move traffic through three or more roadways.

At the time the area around the circle was mostly rural, with the circle being named after Somerville because it was the nearest largest town. In its early days, the area included the Raritan Valley Inn, a place that was frequented by Irving Berlin. The home of New Jersey Senator Joseph Sherman Frelinghuysen, Sr. was also located by the circle. Frelinghuysen had supported the construction of the circle, but moved away years later because of noise from the traffic.

After World War II the area began to become more developed. In 1956 New Jersey's first shopping center, the Somerset Shopping Center, opened next to the circle. As the area became more developed and traffic and road speeds increased, the circle became notorious for being confusing for people unfamiliar with it, and for frequent car accidents and traffic backups. Many drivers would attempt to bypass the circle by using nearby local roads. In 1991 there were 195 reported traffic accidents on the circle.

In September 1991 construction began on a project to improve the circle. The project included an overpass that allows Route 202 to bypass the circle, and the inclusion of traffic signals. The project was completed in 1994. In the year after the overpass opened the circle saw 302 traffic accidents. In an attempt to lower the accident rate the New Jersey Department of Transportation installed yield ahead signs for approaching vehicles in February 1995. The signs made little difference and the accident rate remained high. Another attempt to make the circle safer came in November when the Transportation Department painted lane lines and arrows on the roads and replaced a yield sign with a stop sign. The new changes resulted in fewer accidents.

Despite the state spending US$26 million on the circle, local officials called for it to be bisected and turned into a five-way intersection with traffic lights. They asserted that the circle is still confusing, but no major changes have occurred since 1995. In 2007, the circle had 294 traffic accidents.

== See also ==
- List of traffic circles in New Jersey
