= Somerville Cemetery, Somerville =

Cemetery in Somerville, New Jersey, US

Coordinates: 40°33′41″N 74°36′56″W

Somerville Cemetery
- Interactive map of Somerville Cemetery

Details
- Established: Old: 1813; New: 1867
- Location: Somerville, New Jersey
- Country: United States
- Type: Private
- Owned by: Cemetery Association of Somerville
- Size: Old: 3 to 4 acres (12,000 to 16,000 m^{2}); New: 22.42 acres (90,700 m^{2})
- Website: Official Site
- Find a Grave: Old Cemetery, New Cemetery

Somerville Cemetery refers to two cemeteries located in Somerville, New Jersey, in the United States. The "Old Cemetery" was founded about 1813, but its small size meant that it quickly filled. In 1867, the "New Cemetery" (a much larger burying ground) was founded across Bridge Street from the Old Cemetery. The New Cemetery has a large African American section, an artifact of an era in which burials were often segregated by race.

== Old Cemetery ==
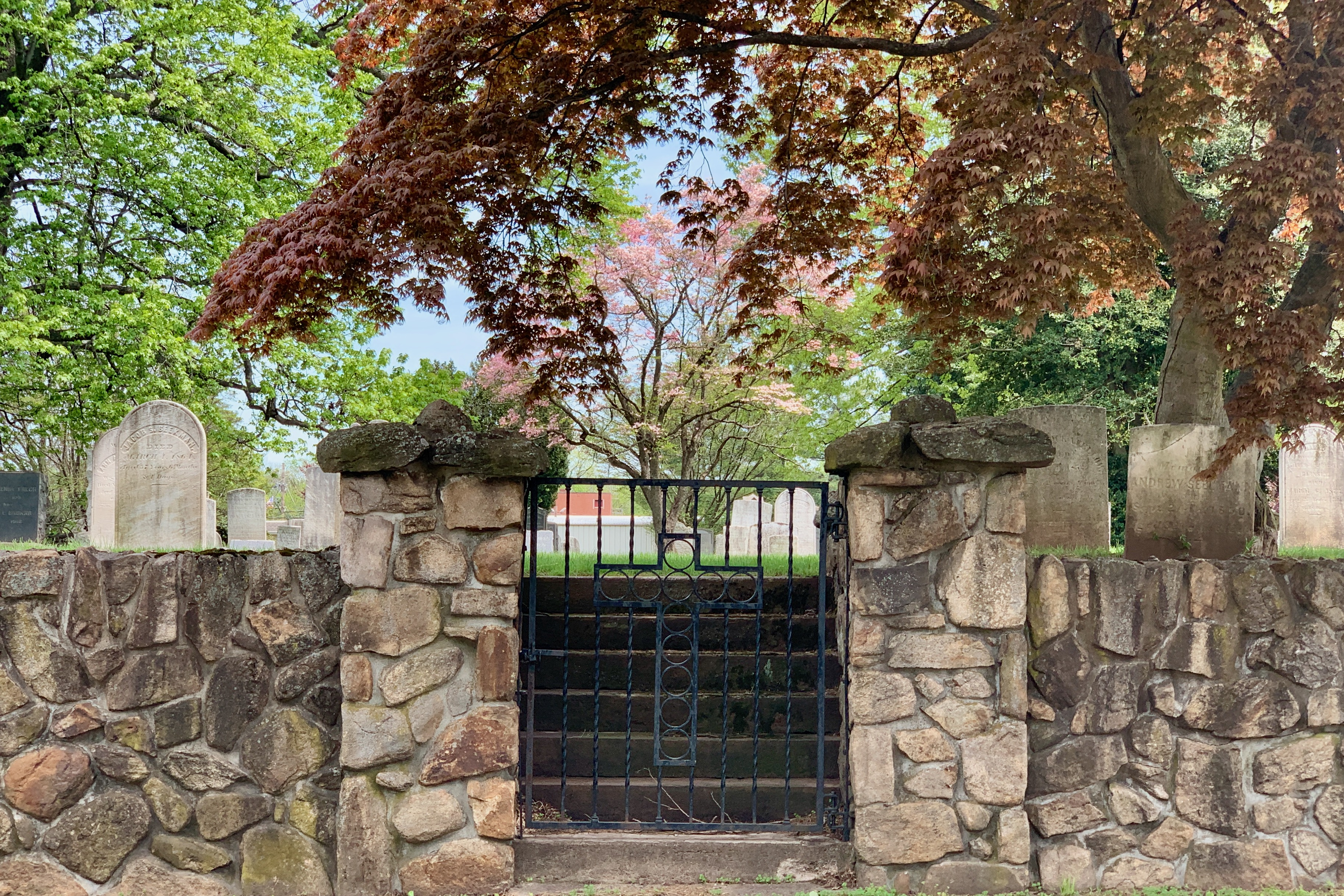
Old Somerville Cemetery entrance

"Old Cemetery", also sometimes referred to as "Old Raritan Cemetery" or the "Bridge Street Cemetery", is located at the intersection of South Bridge Street and 5th Street. It is distinct from the Old Dutch Parsonage Cemetery, located at Washington Place and South Middaugh Street, founded in 1751. Old Cemetery traces its founding to about 1813, when John Whitenack purchased 1 acre (4,000 m^{2}) of land on Bridge Street for a burying ground on behalf of the First Dutch Church of Raritan. The earliest burial is allegedly William Hartwick's child. The earliest burials were near the front of the cemetery on Bridge Street, and are quite close to the wall. Many of the earliest names belong to the Dutch settlers of the area: Frelinghuysen, Hardenburgh, and Voorhees.

In 1847, John C. Garretson agreed to donate about 1 acre (4,000 m^{2}) of land around the cemetery's edges. Gradually, additional land was purchased, until the cemetery had 3 to 4 acres (12,000 to 16,000 m^{2}).

== New Cemetery ==
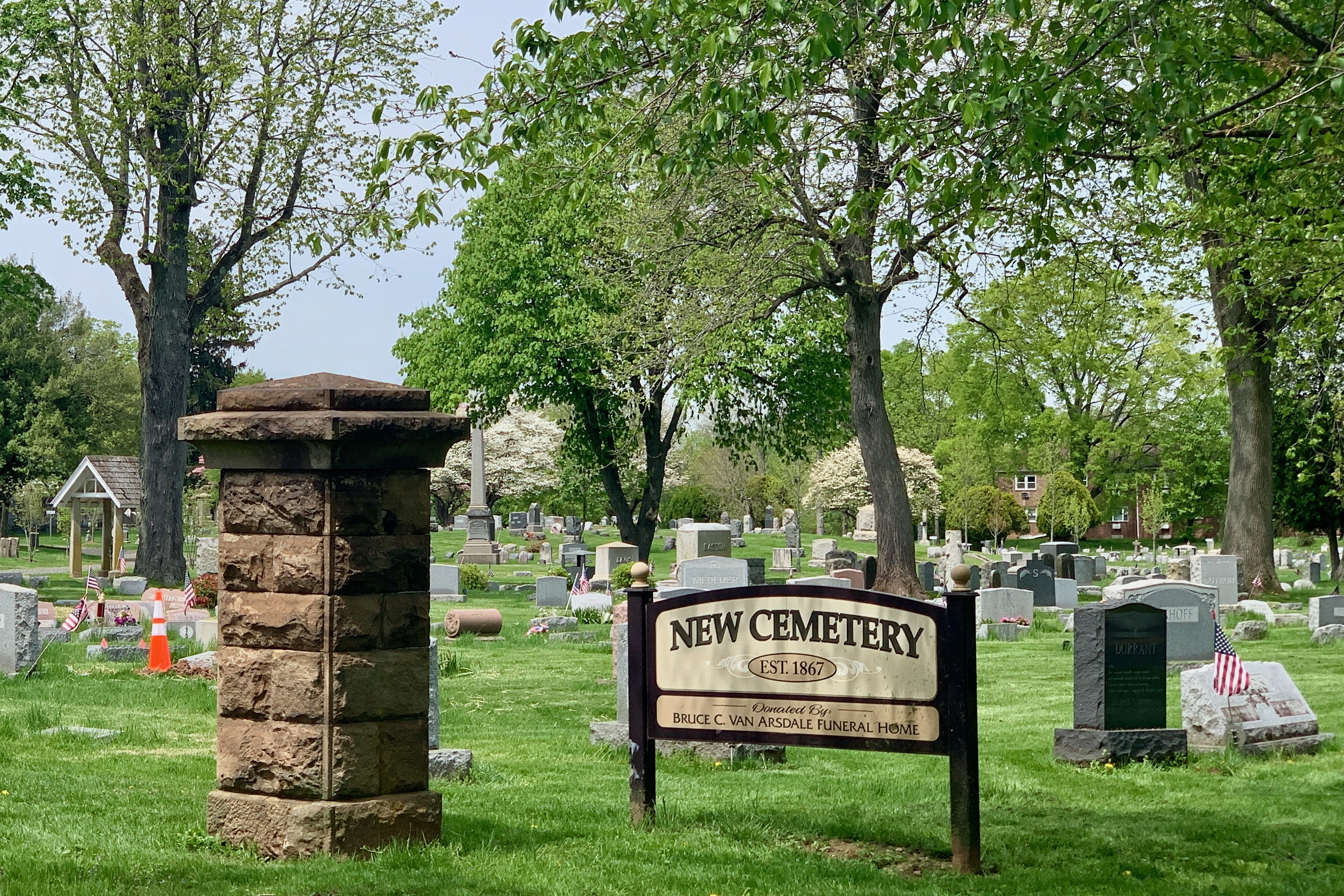
New Cemetery entrance

On August 26, 1867, local citizens of Somerville organized the Somerville Cemetery Association and purchased 68 acres (280,000 m^{2}) of land directly across Bridge Street for $14,500 from William Ross, Jr. The association later sold 45.58 acres (184,500 m^{2}) for $7,292.50, leaving the New Cemetery with just 22.42 acres (90,700 m^{2}). The New Cemetery was laid out in the rural cemetery style with walks, drives, and landscaping. About 1,000 lots were created.

On August 20, 1879, a stock company, the Cemetery Association of Somerville (CAS), was formed. CAS president Hugh Gaston purchased the New Cemetery for $11,000. Most cemeteries in the 1800s and until the 1960s were segregated by race. Its large size permitted many African Americans to be buried in New Cemetery. Many United States Colored Troops who served in the American Civil War are buried in the African American section.

The New Cemetery was still accepting burials in 2010.

== Notable burials ==
=== New Cemetery ===
- Clifford P. Case (1904–1982) – U.S. Representative; U.S. Senator
- Alvah A. Clark (1840–1912) – U.S. Representative
- William G. Steele (1820–1892) – U.S. Representative

=== Old Cemetery ===
- Francis C. Barlow (1834–1896) – Major General, Union Army; co-founder, American Bar Association
- George Houston Brown (1810–1865) – U.S. Representative; Associate Justice, Supreme Court of New Jersey
- John Frelinghuysen (1727–1754) – Minister; co-founder, New Brunswick Theological Seminary and Rutgers University
- Julia E. McConaughy (1834–1885), litterateur and author
- Isaac Southard (1783–1850) – U.S. Representative
- Charles Henry Tompkins Sr. (1834–1895) – Brevet Brigadier General, Union Army

== Bibliography ==
- Barlow, Francis C. and Samito, Christian G. Fear Was Not In Him: The Civil War Letters of Major General Francis C. Barlow, U.S.A. New York: Fordham University Press, 2004.
- Demarest, William H.S. Tercentenary Studies, 1928, Reformed Church in America: A Record of Beginnings. New York: Reformed Church in America, 1928.
- Hunt, Roger D. and Brown, Jack R. Brevet Brigadier Generals in Blue. Gaithersburg, Md.: Olde Soldier Books, 1990.
- Sarapin, Janice Kohl. Old Burial Grounds of New Jersey: A Guide. New Brunswick, N.J.: Rutgers University Press, 1994.
- Snell, James P. and Ellis, Franklin. History of Hunterdon and Somerset Counties, New Jersey. Philadelphia: Everts & Peck, 1881.
