= Frederick Frelinghuysen (general) =

American military figure and politician

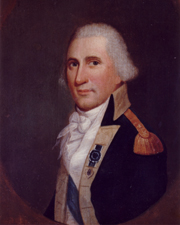

United States Senator from New Jersey
- In office March 4, 1793 – November 12, 1796
- Preceded by: Philemon Dickinson
- Succeeded by: Richard Stockton

Member of the New Jersey General Assembly
- In office 1800–1804

Personal details
- Born: April 13, 1753 Somerville, Province of New Jersey, British America
- Died: April 13, 1804 (aged 51) Millstone, New Jersey, U.S.
- Party: Federalist
- Spouse(s): Gertrude Schenck; Ann Yard
- Children: John Frelinghuysen; Theodore Frelinghuysen; Frederick Frelinghuysen
- Parent(s): John Frelinghuysen; Dinah Van Berg
- Occupation: General, lawyer, United States Senator

Military service
- Allegiance: United States
- Branch/service: New Jersey Militia
- Rank: Brigadier General

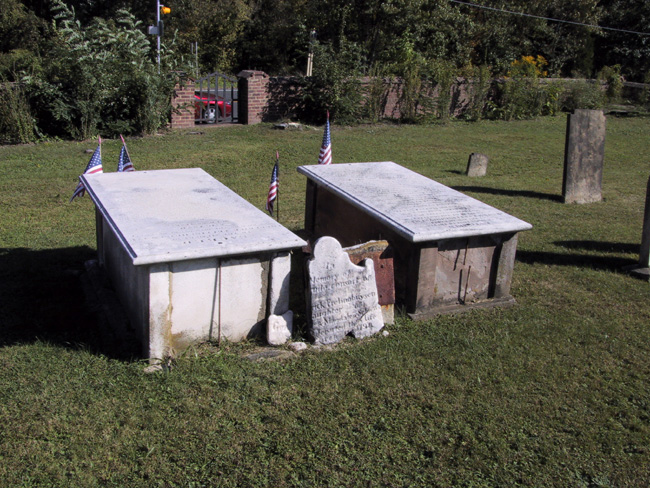
Frederick Frelinghuysen's grave (right)

Frederick Frelinghuysen (April 13, 1753 – April 13, 1804) was a Founding Father of the United States, Patriot in the American Revolution, lawyer, soldier, and senator from New Jersey. A graduate of the College of New Jersey (now Princeton University), Frederick went on to become an officer during the American Revolutionary War. In addition, he served as a delegate to the Continental Congress. He was a United States senator from New Jersey from 1793 until 1796, and served as the United States Attorney for the District of New Jersey in 1801.

== Early life ==
He was born at the Old Dutch Parsonage near Somerville in the Province of New Jersey to John Frelinghuysen and Dinah Van Berg of Amsterdam. His father, John, was the son of the immigrant minister Theodorus Jacobus Frelinghuysen, the progenitor of the Frelinghuysen family in New Jersey.

He graduated from the College of New Jersey (now Princeton University) in 1770, and was the sole instructor at Queen's College, New Brunswick (now Rutgers University) from 1771 to 1774. He studied law and was admitted to the bar in 1774, practicing law in Somerset County, New Jersey.

== Military and political career ==
With the coming of the American Revolution, he became a member of the provincial congress of New Jersey from 1775 to 1776. In the War of Independence he served in the New Jersey militia as an artillery captain, seeing action at Trenton and Monmouth. In 1779 he served as a delegate to the Second Continental Congress. He served as a clerk to the Court of Common Pleas of Somerset County, New Jersey from 1781 to 1789. He also served in the New Jersey General Assembly in 1784 and again from 1800 to 1804.

In 1783, he was elected as an honorary member of the New Jersey Society of the Cincinnati.

He was a member of the New Jersey convention that ratified the United States Constitution in 1787. He was a member of the New Jersey Legislative Council (now the New Jersey Senate) representing Somerset County from 1790 to 1792.

He served as a brigadier general of militia in the 1790 campaign against the western Indians in modern day Ohio. Frelinghuysen was elected to the United States Senate and served from March 4, 1793, to November 12, 1796, when he resigned. He was the runner-up in the 1793 New Jersey gubernatorial election, losing to Richard Howell. He was commissioned major general in the New Jersey militia in 1794, during the Whiskey Rebellion.

== Personal life ==
He married Gertrude Schenck (1753–1794), the daughter of Helena Magdalena Van Liew and Hendrick (Henry) Joahnnes Schenck. Together, they had five children:

- General John Frelinghuysen (1776–1833)
- Maria Frelinghuysen (1778–1832)
- Theodore Frelinghuysen (1787–1862), a lawyer and New Jersey politician
- Frederick Frelinghuysen (1788–1820)
- Catharine Frelinghuysen (1790-1865)

After his first wife Gertrude's death in 1794, Frederick Sr. married Ann Yard (1764–1839).

Frelinghuysen died in Millstone, New Jersey, on April 13, 1804, his 51st birthday, and was buried at the Weston Burying Ground on the border of Manville, New Jersey and Bound Brook, New Jersey. His tombstone reads as follows:

Entombed beneath this stone lies the remains of Frederick Frelinghuysen, Esq. Major General of the military forces and representative in the General Assembly of this, his native state. Endowed by nature with superior talents, he was beloved by his country. From his youth he was entrusted with the most important concerns until his death. He never disappointed her hopes. In the bar he was eloquent and in the Senate he was wise, in the field he was brave. Candid, generous and just, he was ardent in his friendships, constant to his friends. The patron and protector of his honorable merit. He gave his hand to the young, his counsel to the middle aged, his support to him that was feeble in years. To perpetuate his memory, his children have raised this monument, a frail memorial of their veneration to his virtues and of their grief and their loss of so excellent a father. He died on the 13th of April 1804, aged 51 years.

=== Descendants ===
Among his other descendants are Frederick Theodore Frelinghuysen, U.S. Senator and Secretary of State; Joseph Sherman Frelinghuysen, US Senator from New Jersey; Peter Frelinghuysen, Jr., New Jersey Congressman; and Rodney Frelinghuysen, New Jersey Congressman.

U.S. Senate
Preceded by Philemon Dickinson	U.S. senator (Class 2) from New Jersey; March 4, 1793 – November 12, 1796; Served alongside: John Rutherfurd	Succeeded by Richard Stockton
