= Samuel K. Robbins =

American politician (1853–1926)

Samuel Kirkbride Robbins

Speaker of the New Jersey General Assembly
- In office 1906–1906
- Preceded by: John Boyd Avis
- Succeeded by: Edgar E. Lethbridge

Member of the New Jersey Senate from Burlington County
- In office 1907–1909
- Preceded by: John G. Horner
- Succeeded by: Griffith W. Lewis

Personal details
- Born: May 9, 1853 Mount Holly Township, New Jersey, U.S.
- Died: December 26, 1926 (aged 73) Moorestown Township, New Jersey, U.S.
- Party: Republican
- Spouse: Edith E. Shreve
- Children: Agnes Murrell Robbins; Edith Coate Robbins
- Education: Princeton University
- Profession: Attorney

Samuel Kirkbride Robbins (May 9, 1853 – December 26, 1926) was a Republican Party politician who served as Speaker of the New Jersey General Assembly and President of the New Jersey Senate.

== Biography ==
Robbins was born in Mount Holly Township, New Jersey, in 1853, the son of Barzillai W. Robbins and Anne Wilson, his wife. He was educated at Fort Edward Institute in Fort Edward, New York and at Andalusia College in Andalusia, Pennsylvania. He entered Princeton College, graduating with a Bachelor of Arts degree in 1874 and a Master of Arts degree in 1877. After reading law, was admitted to the New Jersey Bar in 1880. Later that year he opened law offices in Moorestown, and Camden.

On October 4, 1882, he married Edith E. Shreve of Pemberton. They had two daughters: Agnes Murrell Robbins and Edith Coate Robbins.

In 1897, Robbins was elected to the Board of Education of Chester Township (now Moorestown Township) in Burlington County, serving until 1903. He served on the Burlington County Board of Election from 1900 to 1903. He was elected to the New Jersey General Assembly as a Republican in 1903, serving until 1906. He was chosen as Speaker of the Assembly in 1906.

In 1906 he was elected to the New Jersey Senate, serving until 1909. He was selected Senate President in 1909. On the last day of the 1909 legislative session he was appointed by Governor John Franklin Fort to be Clerk of the Court of Chancery (an office now known as Clerk of the Superior Court), following the resignation of Vivian M. Lewis. He resigned from the Senate and his nomination was confirmed.

Robbins served as Clerk of the Court of Chancery until 1914. On December 26, 1926, he died from a heart attack at the age of 73 at his home in Moorestown Township, and was to be buried at his birthplace in Mount Holly Township.

Political offices
Preceded by John Boyd Avis	Speaker of the New Jersey General Assembly; 1906	Succeeded by Edgar E. Lethbridge
Preceded by Thomas J. Hillery	President of the New Jersey Senate; 1909	Succeeded by Joseph S. Frelinghuysen
