= John Frederick Frelinghuysen =

American lawyer (1776–1833)

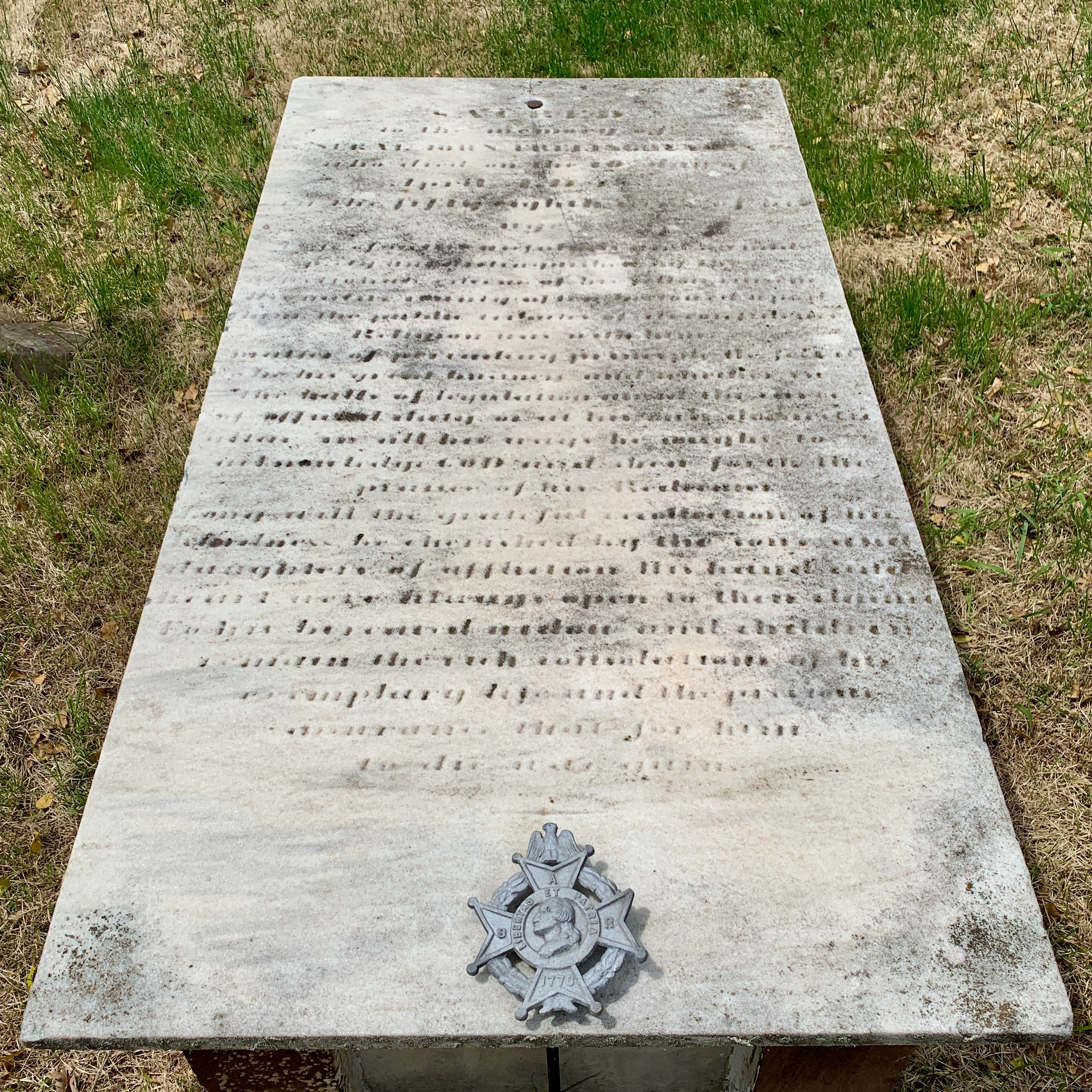
- Frelinghuysen's tombstone at the Old Somerville Cemetery
- Born: March 21, 1776; Millstone, Province of New Jersey
- Died: April 10, 1833 (aged 57); Millstone, New Jersey, U.S.
- Spouses: Louisa Mercer (m. 1797–1809) Elizabeth Mercereau Van Vechten (m. 1811–1833)
- Children: 2 with Louisa; 8 with Elizabeth
- Parent(s): Frederick Frelinghuysen; Gertrude Schenck
- Relatives: Frelinghuysen family

John Frederick Frelinghuysen (March 21, 1776 – April 10, 1833) was an American general and lawyer.

== Biography ==
John Frelinghuysen was born in Millstone, then in the Province of New Jersey, on March 21, 1776, to Frederick Frelinghuysen and Gertrude Schenck. He had four siblings: Catharine, Maria, Theodore, and Frederick. John graduated from Queen's College (now Rutgers University) in 1792 after studying law, and he was admitted to the bar in the state of New Jersey in 1797. He was a member representing Somerset County, New Jersey in the New Jersey Legislative Council (now the New Jersey Senate) from 1805 to 1814 and 1815 to 1820, and served three consecutive five-year terms on the Surrogate Court for Somerset County, New Jersey. During the War of 1812, he joined the military, and commanded the New Jersey State Militia at Sandy Hook, where his assignment was to prevent ships from attacking New York City. At the close of the war he was promoted to brigadier general.

John Frelinghuysen married Louisa Mercer in 1797, and they had two daughters: Gertrude and Mary Ann. Louisa died around 1809 and John married Elizabeth Mercereau Van Vechten on November 13, 1811. They had eight children: Louisa, Theodore, Frederick J., Catharine, Sallie, Sophia, and Elizabeth LaGrange Frelinghuysen.

John Frelinghuysen died in Millstone, New Jersey on April 10, 1833, and was buried in the Old Somerville Cemetery in Somerville, New Jersey. His tombstone reads: "Sacred to the memory of General John Frelinghuysen who died on the 10th day of April A.D. 1833 in the fifty eighth year of his age ..."

== Legacy ==
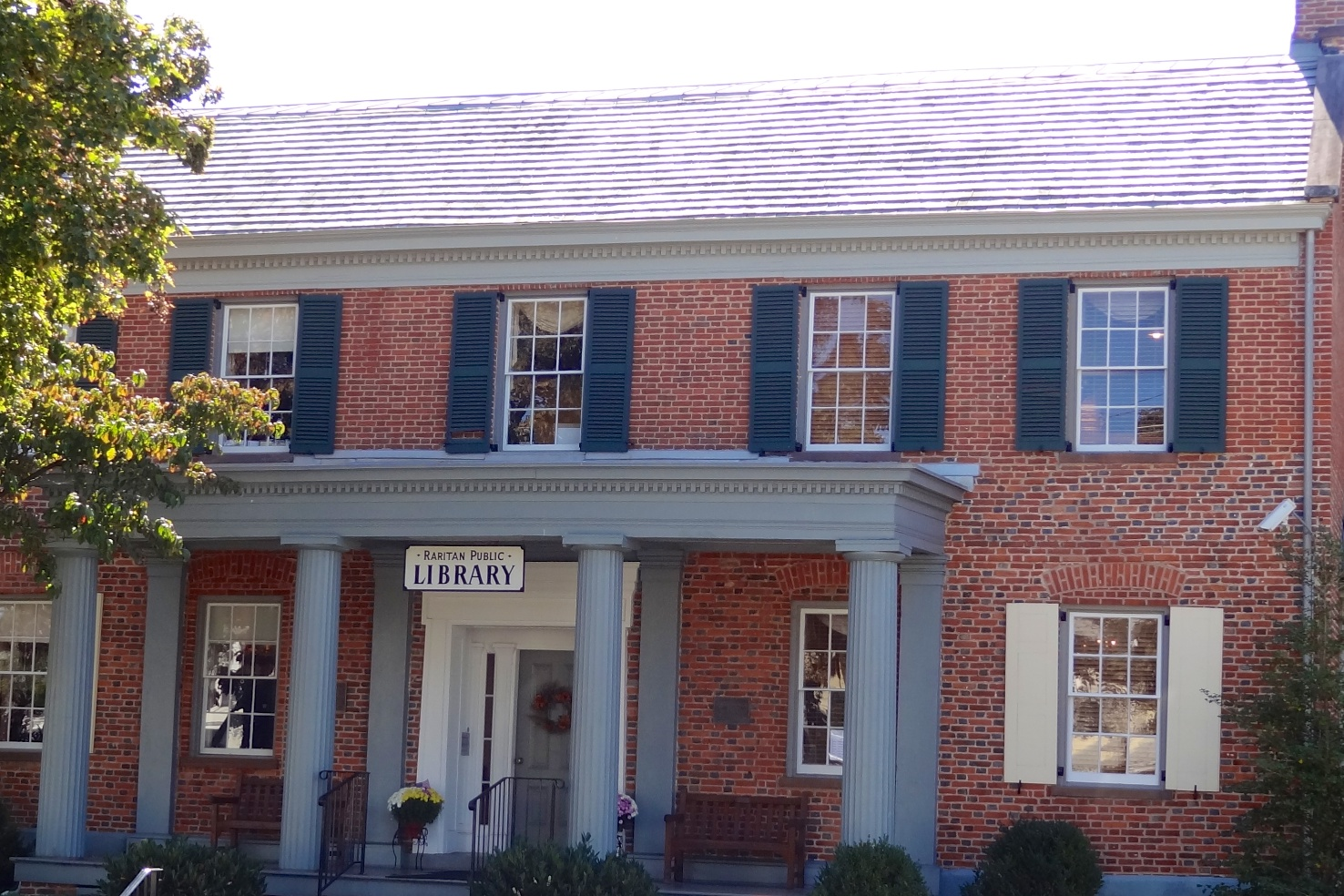
General John Frelinghuysen House, now the Raritan Public Library

His c. 1801 house was donated to the Raritan Public Library in 1970 and retains its 19th-century interior finishes and exterior appearance and serves as an active community library.
