= Eddie Zimmerman =

American baseball player (1883–1945)

- Third baseman
- Born: January 1, 1883; Oceanic, New Jersey, U.S.
- Died: May 6, 1945 (aged 62); Emmaus, Pennsylvania, U.S.
- Batted: Right Threw: Right

MLB debut
- September 29, 1906, for the St. Louis Cardinals

Last MLB appearance
- September 4, 1911, for the Brooklyn Dodgers

MLB statistics
- Batting average: .186
- Home runs: 3
- Runs batted in: 37
- Stats at Baseball Reference

Teams
- St. Louis Cardinals (1906); Brooklyn Dodgers (1911)

Edward Desmond Zimmerman (January 1, 1883 – May 6, 1945) was an American professional baseball third baseman. He played in two seasons in Major League Baseball, for the St. Louis Cardinals in 1906 and the Brooklyn Dodgers in 1911.

Born in the Oceanic section of Rumson, New Jersey, Zimmerman attended Manhattan College.

Zimmerman had an extensive career in minor league baseball. He debuted in 1905 with the Toronto Maple Leafs, and played his final season in 1923 for the Pittsfield Hillies of the Eastern League.
