= Peter Ballantine =

American businessman (1791–1883)

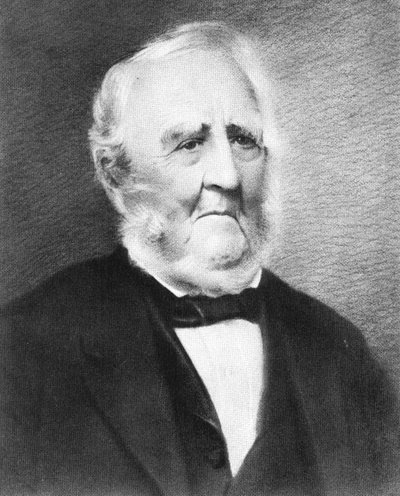
- Peter Ballantine ca. 1880.
- Born: November 16, 1791; Dundee, Scotland
- Died: January 23, 1883 (aged 91); Newark, New Jersey, U.S.
- Known for: P. Ballantine and Sons Brewing Company
- Spouse: Julia Wilson (m. 1830; died 1868)
- Children: 3, including John
- Relatives: Peter H. B. Frelinghuysen (great-grandson); Peter Frelinghuysen Jr. (great-great-grandson); Rodney Frelinghuysen (great-great-great-grandson)

Peter Ballantine (November 16, 1791 – January 23, 1883) was the founder of Patterson & Ballantine Brewing Company in 1840 in Newark, New Jersey, United States.

== Early life ==
He was born on November 16, 1791, in Dundee, Scotland. He decided to leave Scotland due to the "pressure of poverty and the call to great achievement."

== Career ==
In 1820, Ballantine emigrated to Albany, New York where he learned brewing. By 1830, he had established his own brewery there. In 1840, he moved to Newark, New Jersey, and partnered with Erastus Patterson to form P. Ballantine and Sons Brewing Company, and leased the old High Street Brewery that had been built in 1805 by John R. Cumming.

In 1845, Ballantine pulled out of the partnership, and, five years later, built his own brewery on the Passaic River, known as P. Ballantine and Sons Brewing Company. In 1857, he took his sons as partners, and he became the wealthiest man in Newark.

== Personal life ==
In 1830, Ballantine married Julia Wilson (1796–1868), daughter of David Wilson and Abigail Gillespie, of Troy, New York. Together, Peter and Julia were the parents of the following children, all of whom were born in Albany:

- Peter Hood Ballantine (1831–1882), who married the English-born Isabella Linen (1835–1911).
- John Holme Ballantine (1834–1895), who married Jeannette Boyd (1838–1919).
- Robert Francis Ballantine (1836–1905), who married Anna Elizabeth Brown (1838–1926) of New Jersey.

His wife died in Newark on June 7, 1868 of "remittent fever". Peter Ballantine died at his home in Newark, New Jersey, aged 91 after three weeks of bronchitis, on January 23, 1883. He was buried in Mount Pleasant Cemetery in Newark.

=== Descendants ===
Through his eldest son, he was the grandfather of Sara Linen Ballantine (1858–1940), who married the lawyer, and eventual president of the Ballantine breweries, George Griswold Frelinghuysen (1851–1936), a son of U.S. Senator and U.S. Secretary of State Frederick T. Frelinghuysen.

He was a great-grandfather to Peter Hood Ballantine Cumming (1910–1988), who held political office (Mayor of Rumson, New Jersey, 1950–51) and was a noted business executive (Textile Banking Company, Iselin-Jefferson Financial Company, H.A. Caesar & Company).
