= Dick Lynch =

American football player (1936–2008)

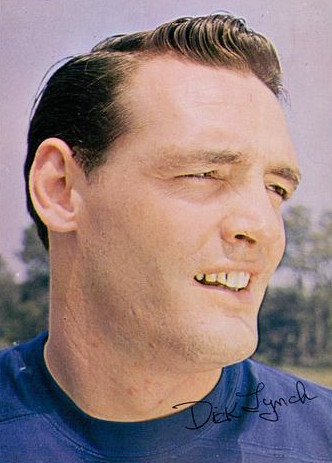
- Lynch in 1965

No. 25, 22
- Position: Defensive back

Personal information
- Born: April 29, 1936; Oceanside, New York, U.S.
- Died: September 24, 2008 (aged 72); Queens, New York, U.S.
- Listed height: 6 ft 1 in (1.85 m)
- Listed weight: 202 lb (92 kg)

Career information
- College: Notre Dame
- NFL draft: 1958: 6th round, 66th overall pick

Career history
- Washington Redskins (1958); New York Giants (1959–1966)

Awards and highlights
- First-team All-Pro (1963); Second-team All-Pro (1961); Pro Bowl (1963); 2× NFL interceptions leader (1961, 1963); New York Giants Ring of Honor; 40th greatest New York Giant of all-time

Career NFL statistics
- Interceptions: 37
- Fumble recoveries: 11
- Touchdowns: 7
- Stats at Pro Football Reference

Richard Dennis Lynch (April 29, 1936 – September 24, 2008) was an American professional football player who was a defensive back in the National Football League (NFL) for the Washington Redskins and the New York Giants. He twice led the NFL in interceptions (1961 and 1963), and had three interceptions in a single game three times during his career.

In 1963, Lynch was named first-team All-Pro and was selected to play in the Pro Bowl for the only time in his career. The Giants went to four pre-Super Bowl era NFL championship games (1959, 1961 to 1963) during Lynch's first five years with the team. Lynch played college football at the University of Notre Dame (1955 to 1957), and his game-winning 1957 touchdown run against the University of Oklahoma Sooners was considered the most spectacular play of the college season by voters in an Associated Press poll. After retiring as a player, Lynch was a radio color commentator for New York Giants football games from the 1967 through 2007 NFL seasons.

== Early life ==
Lynch was born on April 29, 1936, in Oceanside, New York. He grew up in Bound Brook, New Jersey, and attended Phillipsburg Catholic High School, in Phillipsburg, New Jersey. He was a halfback on Phillipsburg's football team, and also played end and returned punts. In 1952 and 1953, Lynch led all Warren County high school football players in scoring. In a mid-October 1953 game, he had three rushing touchdowns, after setting up those scores with runs of 70, 45 and 31 yards. In 1953, Lynch led Phillipsburg to its first undefeated season (8–0), again scoring three touchdowns in the final game of the season. Lynch was named second-team All-State and first-team All-Catholic in football that season, and also was selected the area's most valuable high school football player.

Lynch also played on Phillipsburg's basketball team. He set local parochial high school basketball league records for points scored in a game, during the 1953–54 high school year. He was also an overall scoring leader among Warren County high school teams that season. Lynch also played on Phillipsburg's baseball team.

Lynch graduated from Phillipsburg in 1954, in the same graduating class with older brother Mike Lynch (held back a year due to illness) and younger brother Gene Lynch (who had skipped a grade). The three brothers also had started on the football team together in 1953.

== College career ==
Lynch attended the University of Notre Dame, where he was a two-way player on its football team (1955 to 1957) at halfback on offense and defensive back or linebacker on defense. He also returned kickoffs. As a sophomore in 1955, Lynch had 121 yards on 24 carries as a running back, on an 8–2 Notre Dame team led by head coach Terry Brennan and quarterback Paul Hornung. As a junior in 1956, Lynch had five receptions for 54 yards, and 10 yards in 14 carries.

As a senior in 1957, Lynch led Notre Dame with 13 pass receptions for 128 yards; as well as leading the team with a 31.8 yards per return average on kickoffs and in scoring (30 points). He also had 287 yards on 77 carries (second on the team to future NFL running back Nick Pietrosante), with four rushing touchdowns. In an early November game against Navy, playing defense, Lynch recovered a fumble and returned it for a touchdown.

Lynch's most memorable play at Notre Dame came in mid-November 1957. He scored the only touchdown in Notre Dame's 7–0 upset win over the University of Oklahoma, on a three-yard, fourth down, end run rushing play that ended the Sooners' 47-game winning streak. Notre Dame head coach Terry Brennan said that "Dick Lynch not only scored the winning touchdown, but he played great defense all day long". In an Associated Press poll of 65 sportswriters and editors, that game received the most votes for most spectacular one game performance by any college team that season, and Lynch's touchdown received the most votes for the "most spectacular incident" of the season. He was selected to play in the 1958 Chicago College All-Star Game.

Lynch participated in Notre Dame's charity fundraising Bengal Bouts amateur boxing tournament, winning the lightweight event two consecutive years.

== Professional career ==
=== Washington Redskins ===
The Washington Redskins drafted Lynch in the sixth round of the 1958 NFL draft, 66th overall. As a rookie in 1958, Lynch started 10 games at right cornerback for Washington. He had two interceptions and a fumble recovery that season. He had a leaping one-handed interception against future Hall of Fame quarterback Norm Van Brocklin and the Philadelphia Eagles in the season's last game. As a rookie, he gained a reputation as a hard-hitting defensive back who was skilled in diagnosing plays.

=== New York Giants ===
After the 1958 season, Lynch served six months as a Reserve Officers' Training Corps lieutenant in the signal corps at Fort Monmouth, New Jersey. In spring 1959, the New York Giants traded a fourth round draft choice for Lynch. When Lynch joined the Giants in 1959, future Hall of Fame coach Tom Landry was the team's defensive coach, under head coach Jim Lee Howell. After seeing Lynch play for Washington, Landry was the person who wanted to bring Lynch to the Giants. Lynch had grown up a Giants' fan, and was extremely happy to be joining the team.

In 1959, Lynch started 11 games at left cornerback for the Giants, with one interception and two fumble recoveries. The Giants finished the season with a 10–2 record, and reached the 1959 NFL Championship Game; losing to the Baltimore Colts, 31–16. On offense, the Colts won behind future Hall of Fame quarterback Johnny Unitas, his future Hall of Fame receivers Lenny Moore and Raymond Berry, and tight end Jim Mutscheller. While the Giants had difficulty overall defensively, Lynch did a reasonably good job against Berry.

In 1960, Lynch started all 12 Giants' games at right cornerback. He had three interceptions and two fumble recoveries that season. In the season's final game against the Cleveland Browns, Lynch intercepted quarterback Milt Plum's first pass of the game and returned it 16 yards for a touchdown.

Lynch started all 14 games at right cornerback for the Giants in 1961. He led the NFL in interceptions, with nine. He also had one quarterback sack. Lynch had three interceptions in two different games that season. He intercepted three passes on October 8 against the St. Louis Cardinals. He also had three interceptions in a mid-November game against the Philadelphia Eagles; including two on passes thrown by future Hall of Fame quarterback Sonny Jurgensen. Lynch then had two interceptions the next week against the Pittsburgh Steelers. United Press International (UPI) named Lynch a second-team All-Pro in 1961. The Giants had a 10–3–1 record that season, and lost in the 1961 NFL Championship Game to the Green Bay Packers, 37–0.

In 1962, Lynch started 13 games at right cornerback, with five interceptions on the season. In a September 1962 game against the Philadelphia Eagles, he returned a blocked field goal for a touchdown. Giants' safety Jimmy Patton had recovered the ball after the blocked field goal and run 12 yards. Patton then lateralled the ball to Lynch who ran the remaining 65 yards for a touchdown; to loud boos from the Philadelphia fans. Two weeks later against the St. Louis Cardinals, Giants' linebacker Sam Huff blocked a punt into the endzone, which Lynch recovered for a touchdown. He also had an interception in the same game. The Giants were 12–2 that season, and lost in the 1962 NFL Championship Game to the Packers, 16–7.

Lynch had his career best season in 1963. He once again led the NFL in interceptions with nine; tied with Chicago Bears free safety Roosevelt Taylor. He also led the league in interception return yards. Lynch returned three of those interceptions for touchdowns, tying for the league lead in non-offensive touchdowns with Abe Woodson (who had three touchdowns on kick returns). Lynch had a 47-yard touchdown return on October 13 against the Cleveland Browns, an 82-yard touchdown return on October 20 against the Dallas Cowboys and his former defensive coach Tom Landry, and a 42-yard touchdown return on December 8 against the Washington Redskins (one of two interceptions he had in that game). Lynch had the second three-interception game of his career against the Philadelphia Eagles, in a late September game; with all three interceptions coming on Sonny Jurgensen passes. Lynch also had a quarterback sack that season.

Lynch was selected to play in the Pro Bowl for the first and only time at the end of the 1963 season. He was named first-team All-Pro by UPI, the Associated Press (AP), and the Newspaper Enterprise Association (NEA). The Giants went to the NFL championship game for the fourth time in Lynch's five years with the team, losing to the Chicago Bears, 14–10. Early in that game, Lynch and Huff hit Bears' quarterback Bill Wade, causing him to fumble. Giants' cornerback Erich Barnes recovered the ball, and the Giants went on to score their only touchdown of the game.

In 1964, Lynch started 10 games at right cornerback, with four interceptions; but his play was hindered during the season by injury. Lynch returned to play all 14 games at right cornerback for the Giants in 1965. He had four interceptions and a career high four fumble recoveries. In a November 21 game against the Cardinals, Lynch returned a fumble 60 yards for a touchdown (the seventh and last non-offensive touchdown of his career). He also intercepted a pass that led to a Giants touchdown. Lynch also prevented the Cardinals from scoring a touchdown. His teammate Jerry Hillebrand fumbled an interception into the Giants' end zone, and Lynch fell on the ball. This gave the Cardinals a safety (two points), but prevented them from scoring a touchdown. Lynch led the NFL that season in fumble return yards. He was named the AP's NFL Player of the Week for his performance in the Cardinals’ game.

In his final season (1966), Lynch only appeared in eight games, starting three. He suffered a spinal injury in the first game of the season on September 11 against the Pittsburgh Steelers, and was placed on the injured list. He was not brought back to the Giants' active playing roster until October 20. Lynch announced his retirement in January 1967.

In his Giants' career, Lynch played in 97 regular season games, starting 91, with 35 interceptions, 10 fumble recoveries and two quarterback sacks. He scored seven touchdowns on defense and special teams (four by interception returns, one by fumble recovery, one on a blocked punt, and one on a blocked field goal). Lynch played in four NFL championship games for the Giants, and twice led the NFL in interceptions. Overall in his career, he played in 109 games, started 101, with 37 interceptions and 11 fumble recoveries.

== Legacy and honors ==
Giants' teammate and Pro Football Hall of Fame running back Frank Gifford said of Lynch, "He was a player who played way, way above his physical ability . . . He was an inspirational person for all of us. He was a hell of a cornerback and was as tough as they come". Between his role as a player and broadcaster, Lynch was associated with the Giants for over 50 years. At the time of his death, Giants' team president John Mara said "Dick was such an important part of our organization for so many years that we really considered him part of the family . . . He was a true Giant as a player, a broadcaster and as a man. We will miss him dearly . . . ."

In 2015, Lynch was inducted into the Giants’ Ring of Honor. In 2024, he was named the 40th greatest Giants’ player in team history.

== Media career ==
After Lynch retired as a player Giants' owner Wellington Mara, who felt a deep connection to Lynch, decided to make Lynch a radio color commentator for Giants' games; even though Lynch had no experience in that profession. Lynch went on to work as the Giants' radio color commentator for the next 40 years; from the 1967 season through the 2007 season. He was a fan favorite during his 40-year broadcasting career. This was in part because he had played for the Giants during an era when the team was successful and regularly appeared in championship games; and he had the ability to tell long stories about those times, while also commenting on the game being played. Lynch was also fondly known by Giants' fans for his malapropisms, strong pro-Giant "homer" approach to calling games, and rambunctious style. Sportswriter Jerry Izenberg called Lynch's broadcasting style "neighborhood saloon personal". Lynch worked as a commentator in the team’s first four Super Bowl appearances. His last game as a radio color analyst was Super Bowl XLII, the Giants winning 17–14 over the favored New England Patriots.

In 1967 and 1968, Lynch began working Giants' radio games for the Giant Radio Network with play by play announcer Woody Erdman, and at times also including Ted Hodge and Whitey Ford; while Marty Glickman, Al DeRogatis, Chip Cipolla and/or Charlie Conerly broadcast Giants games simultaneously at radio station WNEW. In 1975, he replaced Sam Huff as the Giants' color commentator at WNEW, working alongside Marv Albert and sports director Cipolla. Over the years, he was paired with other notable play-by-play announcers, including among others, Marty Glickman, Jim Gordon, and Bob Papa. Lynch also worked with fellow color commentator Dave Jennings, a former Giants' punter turned color analyst. Lynch's role in covering the Giants for four decades was often compared to that of Phil Rizzuto's in broadcasting New York Yankees' games for 40 years.

== Personal life ==
Lynch and his wife Rosalie married three days before the 1961 NFL Championship Game. In addition to his post-football media career, after retiring as a player in 1967, Lynch worked as a vice president of sales for Trans-National Communications. Lynch's son John Lynch attended Notre Dame and played on its football team in the 1990s.

Lynch's son, Richard Lynch (31), was killed in the September 11 terrorist attacks on the World Trade Center in New York City, where he worked on the 84th floor of Two World Trade Center. On learning of his son's death, Lynch said "What I keep saying to myself are the words of Jesus Christ: Forgive them Father for they know not what they do". Lynch said the hardest thing he ever had to do was broadest a Giants game just 12 days after his son had been killed.

== Death ==
Lynch died from leukemia on September 24, 2008, aged 72, at his home in Douglaston, Queens. He had been treated for the disease over the preceding 10 years. At the time of his death, Lynch had been married to Rosalie Lynch for nearly 47 years. They had six children (their son Richard having predeceased Lynch) and eleven grandchildren.

== See also ==
- History of the New York Giants (1925–1978)
