= Christian William Feigenspan =

American brewer (1976–1939)

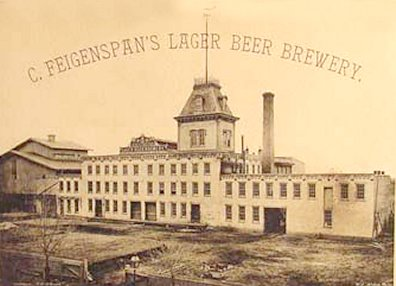
- C. Feigenspan Brewing Company in Newark, New Jersey circa 1890–1900
- Born: December 7, 1876
- Died: February 7, 1939 (aged 62); Rumson, New Jersey
- Education: Cornell University
- Occupation: Brewer
- Parents: Christian B. Feigenspan (c1850-1899) (father); Marie Rachael Laible (c1850-1940) (mother)

Christian William Feigenspan (December 7, 1876 – February 7, 1939) was president of Feigenspan Brewing Company, president of Federal Trust Company, and president of the United States Brewers' Association.

== Birth ==
He was born in 1876 to Rachel Caroline Laible (1852–1882) and Christian Benjamin Feigenspan (1844–1899) of Thuringia. He had three siblings: Edwin Christian Feigenspan (1886–1953); Eleanor Feigenspan (1892–1986) who married Lewis Bacon Ballantyne; and Johanna Caroline, who married Rudolph Victor Kuser. He graduated from Cornell University in 1898, and his father died in 1899. He married Alis Rule Thoms in 1909, and they had no children from their marriage.

== Feigenspan Brewing Company ==
The brewery started at 49 Charlton Street in Newark, New Jersey, in 1875. In 1878 he moved the brewery to 47 Belmont Avenue in Newark, New Jersey. Around 1890 the brewery was moved to the corner of Freeman and Christie Streets. The brewer's logo was "P.O.N." (Pride Of Newark). In 1944 the brewery was bought by P. Ballantine and Sons.

== Death ==
He died on February 7, 1939, in Rumson, New Jersey.

== Awards ==
- Silver Medal at the Paris Exposition (1878)
