= Clarence H. Adams =

American government official and businessman

Clarence H. Adams (November 1, 1905 – May 10, 1987) was an American government official and businessman who served as a commissioner of the U.S. Securities and Exchange Commission from 1952 to 1956.

== Early life ==
Adams was born on November 1, 1905, in Ogunquit, Maine (then part of Wells, Maine) to Orin J. Adams and Rose (Moody) Adams. In 1923 he graduated from Wells High School. He began his banking career with the York County Trust Company in Ogunquit. In 1923 he moved to Hartford to work as a cashier for Fuller, Richter, Aldrich & Co.

== Government career ==
From 1931 to 1952, Adams was the Securities Administrator for Connecticut Banking Department. He was the first person to hold this position. During this time he also was director of the Connecticut Fraud Bureau, assistant to the state banking commissioner and president of the National Association of State Securities Administrators.

He was a member U.S. Securities and Exchange Commission from 1952 to 1956.

== Business career ==
After leaving the SEC, Adams became chairman and chief executive officer of National Equities Inc., a private real estate investment and development company. In this role he also served as vice president and treasurer of the Kratter Corporation, vice president of Ruppert Knickerbocker Brewery, and trustee and President of the Boston Celtics.

== Personal life ==
On October 10, 1931, Adams married Arlene M. Sawyer. They remained married until his death in 1987. They had two daughters.

Adams was a member of the Republican Party, Freemasons, Knights Templar, Royal Order of Jesters, and Shriners.

Adams was a resident of Ogunquit, Maine, Bloomfield, Connecticut, Washington, D.C., and Mamaroneck, New York.

== Death ==
Adams died on May 10, 1987, in Portland, Maine.

Preceded by Harry A. McDonald	Member of U.S. Securities and Exchange Commission; 1952-56	Succeeded by James C. Sargent
Preceded by Jack Waldron	President of the Boston Celtics; 1967-68	Succeeded by Jack Waldron
