= Jack Waldron =

Jack Waldron may refer to:

- Jack Waldron (actor) (1893–1969), American actor-comedian, singer and dancer
- John C. Waldron (1900–1942), United States Navy aviator
- Jack Waldron (basketball), (1912–1971), American brewery executive
