= John Ballantine House =

Museum in Newark, New Jersey

- U.S. National Register of Historic Places
- U.S. National Historic Landmark
- U.S. Historic district – Contributing property
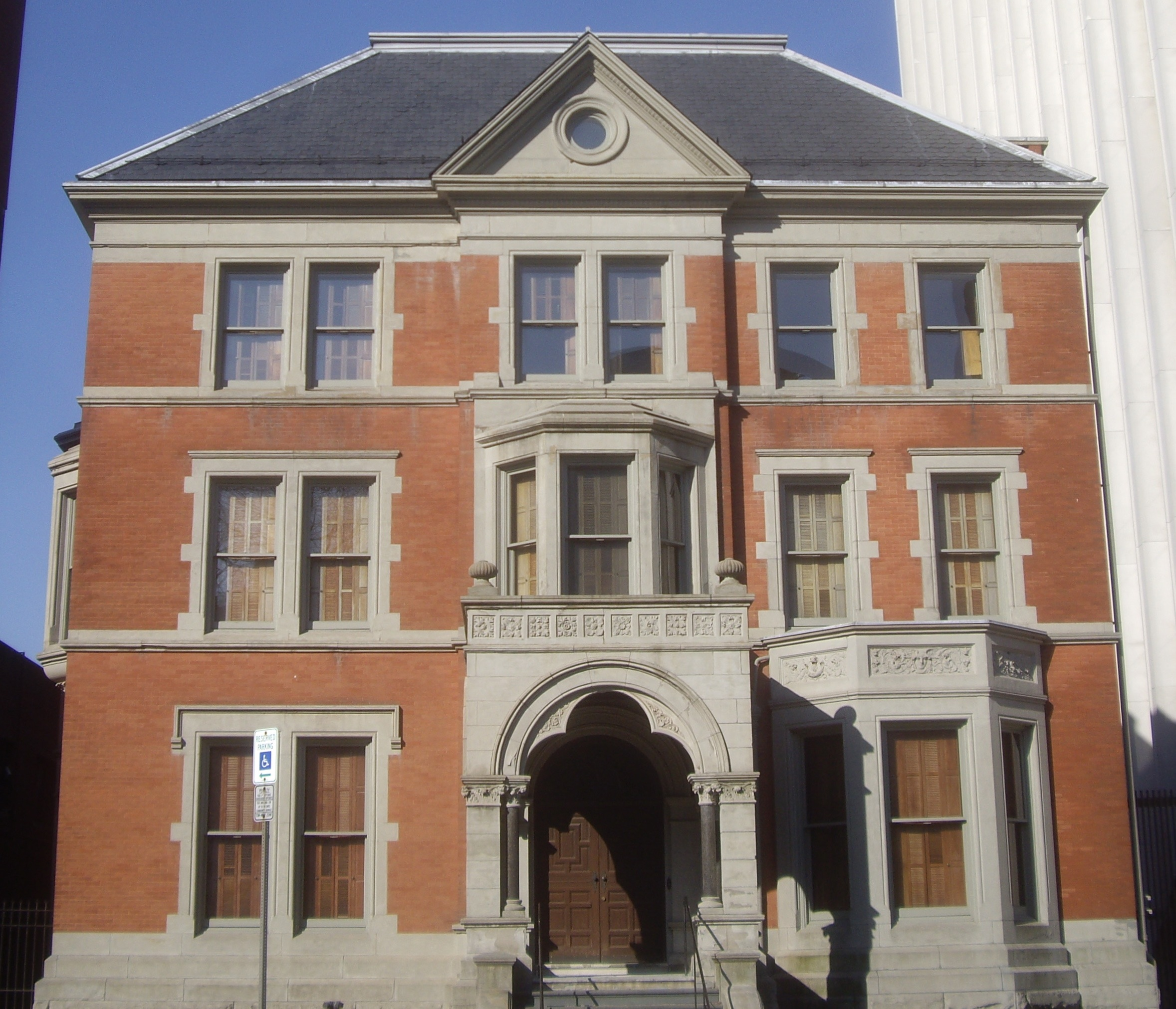

- Location within Essex County, New Jersey Location within New Jersey Location within the United States
- Location: 49 Washington Street, Newark, New Jersey, USA
- Coordinates: 40°44′35.10″N 74°10′16.50″W
- Built: 1885
- Architect: George Harney
- Architectural style: Late Victorian
- Part of: James Street Commons Historic District (ID78001758)
- NRHP reference No.: 73001093

Significant dates
- Added to NRHP: October 2, 1973
- Designated NHL: February 4, 1985
- Designated CP: January 9, 1978

The John Ballantine House is a historic house museum at 49 Washington Street in the Washington Park section of Newark, Essex County, New Jersey, United States. Built in 1884 to a design by George Edward Harney and little altered since 1900, it was the home of Jeannette Boyd (1838–1919) and John Holme Ballantine (1834–1895), the son of Peter Ballantine, founder of the Ballantine beer brewery. The house was designated a National Historic Landmark for its architecture, and for the completeness of the documentary record accompanying its construction and alteration. It is now owned and managed by The Newark Museum of Art, and is open to the public for tours.

== Description ==
The Ballantine House stands on the west side of Washington Street in Newark, facing Washington Park near its southern edge. It is a three-story masonry structure, built out of salmon-colored Philadelphia pressed brick with sandstone trim and a truncated hip roof. It has an asymmetrical five-bay facade, with a projecting central bay topped by a gable. The left bays have sash windows under shared lintels, while the upper-level right-side windows are set independently. The ground floor right side bay has a projecting polygonal window group. The center entrance is sheltered by a stone portico with rounded arches supported by granite columns with Corinthian capitals. The interiors were provided by the New York firm of D. S. Hess Company, "decorators and manufacturers of artistic furniture". The dining room was hung with part-gilded embossed panels imitating the "Spanish" leather hangings that were popular in Holland and England in the sixteenth and early seventeenth centuries.

== History ==
John Holme Ballantine became president of the Ballantine Brewery in 1883 after his father died. Ballantine died in 1895 of throat cancer.

The architect who provided designs for the house was George Edward Harney (1839–1924) of New York City. At the time of its construction, it was one of the finest of a series of grand houses to face Washington Park. It is now the only one of those left. The family retained ownership of the house until 1920, and it was acquired by the Newark Museum in 1937. The museum also acquired a complete set of bills and records for the house's construction, decoration, and alteration.

== As a museum ==
At Christmas season, the house is dressed with holly and other winter greens in traditional Victorian style. A brief history of the house, by its curator Ulysses Grant Dietz, The Ballantine House, was published by the museum in 1994 to coincide with the reopening of the house, which has belonged to the Newark Museum since 1937, after a two-year four-million dollar renovation. The Ballantine House was declared a National Historic Landmark in 1985.

In 1937, the house was acquired by the Newark Museum. The exterior and interior of the house were rehabilitated by local contractors and conservators between 2021 and 2023, and it reopened in November 2023 with the addition of new galleries, such as Made in Newark, which focuses on the 19th-century furniture, jewelry and metalwork trades of the city.

== See also ==
- List of National Historic Landmarks in New Jersey
- National Register of Historic Places listings in Essex County, New Jersey
- List of museums in New Jersey
