= Jack Waldron (basketball) =

American brewery executive (1912–1971)

John Joseph "Jack" Waldron (March 13, 1912 – July 20, 1971) was an American brewery executive who served as President of the Rupert Knickerbocker Brewing Company and P. Ballantine and Sons Brewing Company. He also served as President of the Boston Celtics from 1965 to 1967 and again from 1968 to 1970.

== Early life ==
Waldron grew up in New Bedford, Massachusetts. He attended Fordham University, where he played on the football team and roomed with Vince Lombardi. He graduated from New York University with an MBA in 1938.

== Business career ==
Waldron then became a certified public accountant and worked for the firm of Haskins and Sells for ten years. He left Haskins and Sells for the Rupert Knickerbocker Brewing Company, where he served as treasurer, vice president, executive vice president, and vice chairman of the board before becoming president in 1963.

== Boston Celtics ==
In 1965, Waldron negotiated Rupert's purchase of the Boston Celtics from Louis Pieri and Marjorie Brown. National Equities, Rupert's parent company, later sold the brewing company but retained the Celtics. Waldron left Rupert and remained with the Celtics.

In 1967, Waldron moved to Ballantine as vice president. There he negotiated Ballantine's purchase of the Celtics and once again became team president. In 1969, he became president of Ballantine. He resigned this position later that year when the company was purchased by Investors Funding Corporation. The Celtics were soon sold to Trans-National Communications and Waldron remained with the team. In 1970, Waldron left the Celtics to become president of the Robbin-Dale Uniform Company.

== Death ==
Waldron died on July 20, 1971, at the age of 59 after a three-month bout with cancer.

| Preceded by Louis Pieri | President of the Boston Celtics; 1965–67 | Succeeded by Clarence H. Adams |
| Preceded by Clarence H. Adams | President of the Boston Celtics; 1968–70 | Succeeded by Red Auerbach |
| Preceded by Richard Griebel | President of P. Ballantine & Sons; February 17, 1969–June 24, 1969 | Succeeded by Stephen D. Haymes |
