= Louis Pieri =

American sports executive and coach

Louis Arthur Raymond Pieri (February 23, 1897 – June 16, 1967) was an American basketball and ice hockey executive and coach.

== Ice hockey ==
In 1929, he was named general manager of the Providence Reds. The team became a charter member of the American Hockey League in 1936. Under his leadership, the Reds won eight AHL division titles and four Calder Cup championships (1938, 1940, 1949, 1956).

The American Hockey League presents the Louis A.R. Pieri Memorial Award annually to its outstanding coach. Pieri was inducted into the American Hockey League Hall of Fame in 2009 and the Rhode Island Hockey Hall of Fame in 2018.

== Basketball ==
During the 1918–19 season, Pieri was the head coach of the Brown Bears men's basketball team.

Pieri was the owner of the Providence Steamrollers, a Basketball Association of America team that operated from 1946 to 1949.

From 1950 to 1964, he was a minority owner of the Boston Celtics. Following the death of owner Walter A. Brown on September 7, 1964, Pieri became co-owner of the team with Brown's widow, Marjorie Brown. They sold the club to the Ruppert Knickerbocker Brewing Company, a subsidiary of Marvin Kratter's National Equities.

== Other ventures ==
Pieri was the longtime owner and manager of the Rhode Island Auditorium. In 1940 he and eight other arena managers founded the Ice Capades.

In 1951, Pieri got involved with broadcasting. He purchased a Providence radio station, WDEM. The station's call letters were subsequently changed to WICE; Pieri sold the station in 1956.

== Death ==
On June 16, 1967, Pieri died of a heart attack.

Preceded by Walter A. Brown	President of the Boston Celtics; 1963–65	Succeeded by Jack Waldron
Preceded by Walter A. Brown	Boston Celtics principal owner with Marjorie Brown; 1964–1965	Succeeded by National Equities
