= Ryan Murphy (ice hockey, born 1983) =

American ice hockey player and coach

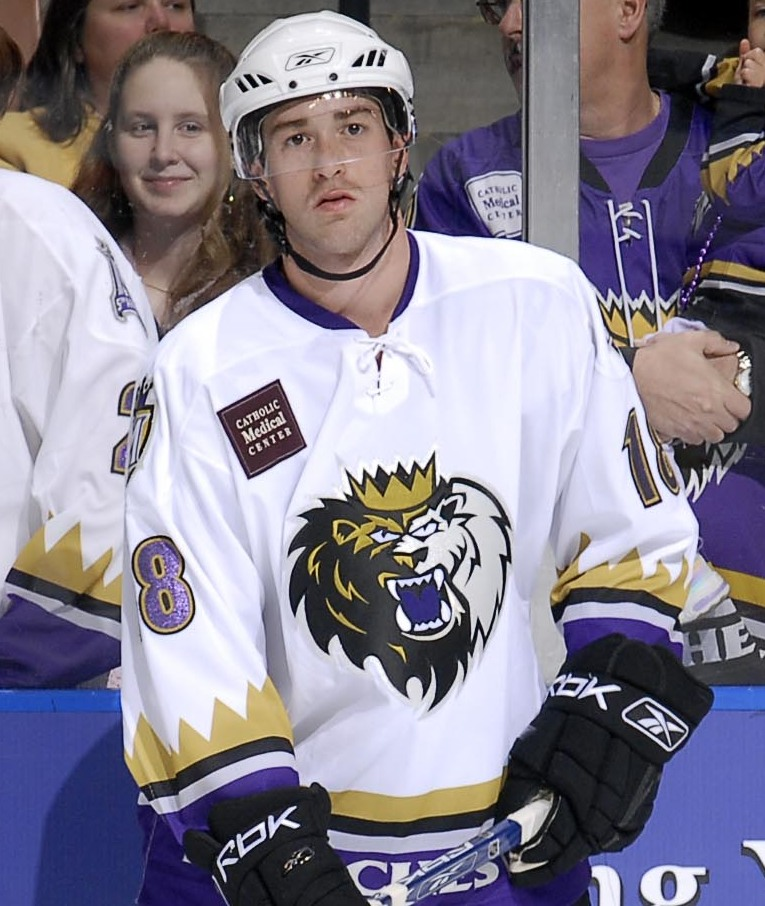
- Murphy with the Manchester Monarchs in 2006
- Born: January 23, 1983 (age 43) Rumson, New Jersey, U.S.
- Height: 5 ft 11 in (180 cm)
- Weight: 185 lb (84 kg; 13 st 3 lb)
- Position: Right wing
- Shot: Right
- Played for: Manchester Monarchs; Hartford Wolf Pack; Peoria Rivermen
- NHL draft: 185th overall, 2002; Los Angeles Kings
- Playing career: 2005–2009

Ryan Murphy (born January 23, 1983) is an American former professional ice hockey forward who played five seasons in the AHL with the Manchester Monarchs, Hartford Wolf Pack, and Peoria Rivermen. He also played in the ECHL with the Charlotte Checkers. Murphy was selected by the Los Angeles Kings in the 6th round (185th overall) of the 2002 NHL entry draft. He was an assistant coach for the Bakersfield Condors of the ECHL in the 2013–14 season. He was an assistant coach for the Hershey Bears of the American Hockey League from 2014 to 2018 under head coach Troy Mann, and then followed Mann to the Belleville Senators.

== Playing career ==
=== Amateur ===
At the age of 16, Ryan was named to the 1999-00 U.S. National U-18 Team in the North American Hockey League. That same season he dressed in four games with the U.S. Junior National Team. The following season he played 24 games with the U.S. Junior National Team.

Ryan played four years of collegiate hockey at Boston College playing with the Boston College Eagles (2001–05).

=== Professional ===
Immediately following graduation, Ryan turned professional suiting up with the Manchester Monarchs of the American Hockey League for the final five games and playoffs of the 2004–05 AHL season.

Ryan went on to play four more seasons in the AHL and ECHL before retiring from professional hockey after the 2008–09 AHL season.

== Career statistics ==
=== Regular season and playoffs ===
			Regular season					Playoffs
Season	Team	League	GP	G	A	Pts	PIM	GP	G	A	Pts	PIM
1998–99	St. Paul's School	HS Prep
1999–2000	US NTDP U18	NAHL	53	9	14	23	54	—	—	—	—	—
1999–2000	US NTDP U18	USDP	4	0	0	0	0	—	—	—	—	—
2000–01	US NTDP Juniors	USHL	24	4	4	8	21	—	—	—	—	—
2001–02	Boston College	HE	35	7	7	14	16	—	—	—	—	—
2002–03	Boston College	HE	39	8	10	18	22	—	—	—	—	—
2003–04	Boston College	HE	42	6	9	15	30	—	—	—	—	—
2004–05	Boston College	HE	40	4	8	12	36	—	—	—	—	—
2004–05	Manchester Monarchs	AHL	5	0	0	0	0	2	0	0	0	2
2005–06	Manchester Monarchs	AHL	68	7	7	14	34	7	0	1	1	2
2006–07	Manchester Monarchs	AHL	29	5	5	10	33	8	0	0	0	2
2007–08	Charlotte Checkers	ECHL	37	8	20	28	14	3	0	1	1	0
2007–08	Hartford Wolf Pack	AHL	9	0	1	1	2	—	—	—	—	—
2007–08	Peoria Rivermen	AHL	10	0	0	0	6	—	—	—	—	—
2008–09	Charlotte Checkers	ECHL	56	7	19	26	59	6	1	3	4	6
2008–09	Manchester Monarchs	AHL	17	2	5	7	6	—	—	—	—	—
AHL totals			138	17	15	32	81	17	0	1	1	6
ECHL totals			93	15	39	54	73	9	1	4	5	6

=== International ===
Year	Team	Event	GP	G	A	Pts	PIM
2000	United States	U17	6	1	6	7
2001	United States	WJC18	6	1	3	4	2
Junior totals			12	2	9	11	2
