= Rumson, New Jersey =

Borough in Monmouth County, New Jersey, US

- Borough
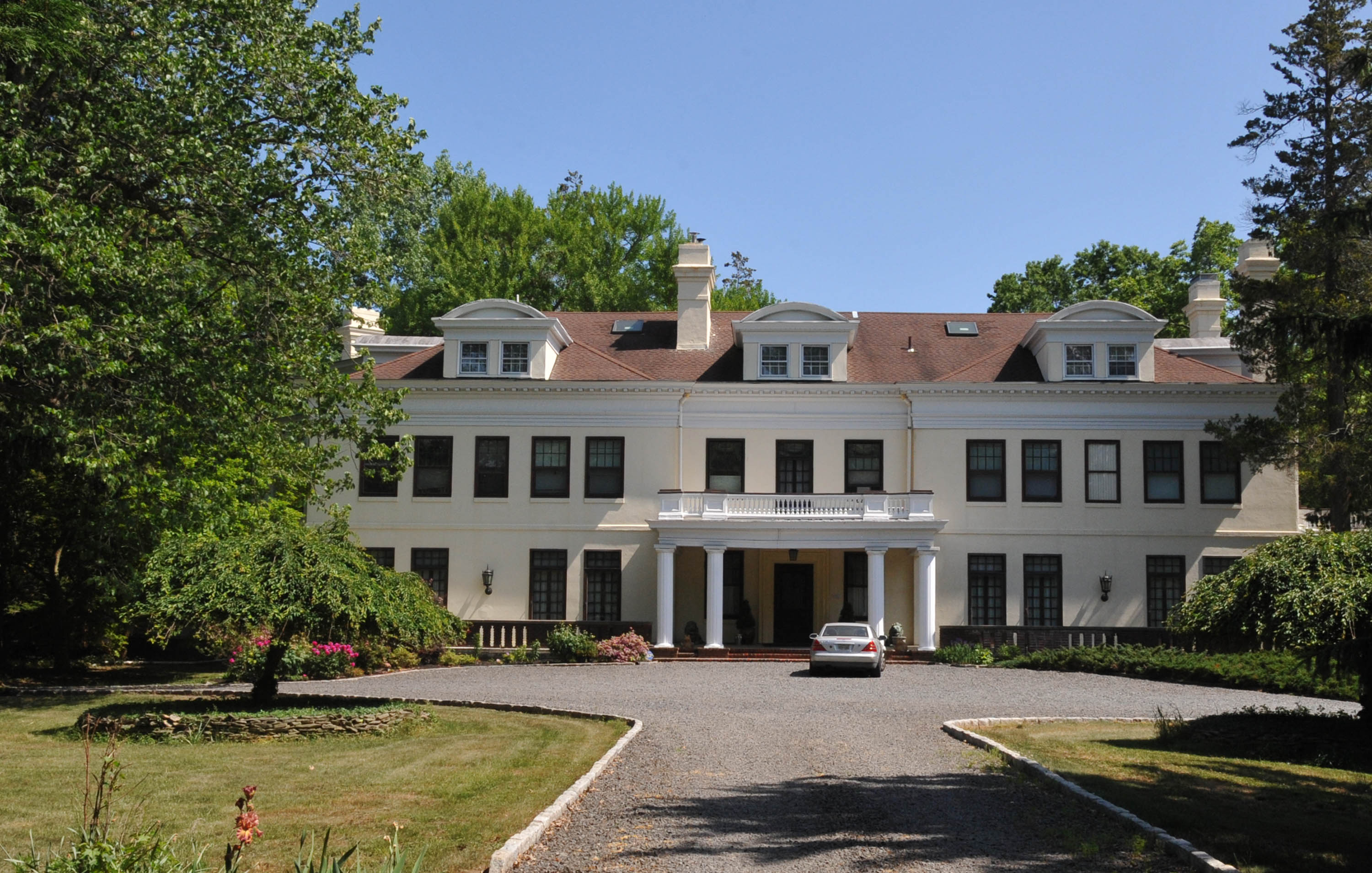
- Lauriston

- Seal

- Map of Rumson in Monmouth County. Inset: Location of Monmouth County highlighted in the State of New Jersey.

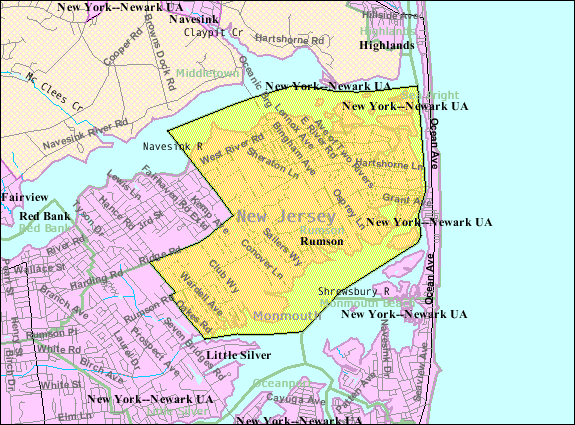
- Census Bureau map of Rumson, New Jersey

- Location in Monmouth County Location in New Jersey Location in the United States
- Coordinates: 40°22′19″N 73°59′58″W
- Country: United States
- State: New Jersey
- County: Monmouth
- Incorporated: June 18, 1907

Government
  - Type: Borough
  - Body: Borough Council
  - Mayor: Joseph K. Hemphill (R, term ends December 31, 2027)
  - Administrator / Municipal clerk: Thomas S. Rogers

Area
  - Total: 7.11 sq mi (18.42 km^{2})
  - Land: 5.07 sq mi (13.12 km^{2})
  - Water: 2.05 sq mi (5.30 km^{2}) 28.76%
  - Rank: 242nd of 565 in state 16th of 53 in county
- Elevation: 36 ft (11 m)

Population (2020)
  - Total: 7,343
  - Estimate (2023): 7,178
  - Rank: 309th of 565 in state 23rd of 53 in county
  - Density: 1,449.2/sq mi (559.5/km^{2})
  - Rank: 340th of 565 in state 41st of 53 in county
- Time zone: UTC−05:00 (Eastern (EST))
  - Summer (DST): UTC−04:00 (Eastern (EDT))
- ZIP Code: 07760
- Area code: 732
- FIPS code: 3402565130
- GNIS feature ID: 0885381
- Website: www.rumsonnj.gov

Rumson is a borough in Monmouth County, in the U.S. state of New Jersey, and is part of the New York Metropolitan Area. As of the 2020 United States census, the borough's population was 7,343, an increase of 221 (+3.1%) from the 2010 census count of 7,122, which in turn reflected a decline of 15 (−0.2%) from 7,137 in 2000.

Rumson was formed by an act of the New Jersey Legislature on March 15, 1907, from portions of Shrewsbury Township, based on results of a referendum held on June 18, 1907.

The borough has been one of the state's highest-income communities. In the 2013–2017 American Community Survey, Rumson had a median household income of $158,229 (ranked 24th in the state) and included 43.9% of households earning more than $200,000 annually.

Rumson ranked among the highest annual property tax bills in New Jersey, and was the highest in Monmouth County, at $20,602 in 2018, compared to a statewide average of $8,767.

In 2010, Forbes.com listed Rumson as 192nd in its listing of "America's Most Expensive ZIP Codes", with a median home price of $1,104,271.

== History ==
Legend has it that the borough's name is derived from early European settlers who bought the land from the local Lenape Native Americans in exchange for some rum. But as far back as 1663, long before the area was officially named Rumson, Native Americans called it "Navarumsunk". Over the years it has been shortened to "Rumson", though sources also talk of a Chief Alumson as a source of the name. Other names Rumson has been known by include Black Point, Port Washington and Oceanic.

Rumson was purchased by English settlers in pieces. The first purchase was dated January 25, 1665, and it included parts of Middletown. The rest of the area was purchased later that year.

Rumson is known for its many sprawling 19th-century estates located alongside the shores of the Navesink and Shrewsbury rivers and also dotted along the historic Rumson Road (serving as one of Rumson's main thoroughfares). Now an upscale commuter suburb, Rumson was once a prominent summer colony for wealthy New York bankers and industrialists during the turn of the century, c. 1900. The oldest of Rumson's homes was the Tredwell House, named after a family that summered there for almost 100 years. The oldest part of the house was from 1670, and the estate once occupied 700 acres (2.8 km^{2}). It was the second-oldest building in Monmouth County when it was destroyed by fire in June 2006.

The Lauriston Mansion, built in 1870 and listed on the National Register of Historic Places in 2002, is a 10,000-square-foot (930 m^{2}) home constructed in the Colonial Revival style. Originally, the home sat on 39 acres (16 ha) of land, which over the years were parceled out, leaving 6 acres (2.4 ha) of land. Plans have been submitted to demolish the building, which the developer stated could not be renovated, and to replace it with townhomes that would include affordable housing, leading Preservation New Jersey to declare the home "endangered" as of 2020.

In the 19th century, Rumson's summer residents enjoyed many activities, such as swimming and boating in the adjacent Navesink River and the Atlantic Ocean, or taking wagon rides. In winter, residents used the river for ice boating.

== Geography ==
According to the U.S. Census Bureau, the borough had a total area of 7.11 square miles (18.4 km^{2}), including 5.07 square miles (13.1 km^{2}) of land and 2.05 square miles (5.3 km^{2}) of water (28.76%). It has a humid subtropical climate (Köppen: Cfa) and average monthly temperatures range from 32.5 °F (0.3 °C) in January to 75.2 °F (24.0 °C) in July.

Unincorporated communities, localities and place names located partially or completely within the township include East Oceanic, Elsemere, Oceanic, Rumson Bluffs, Rumson Hills and Waterloo.

The borough borders the Monmouth County municipalities of Fair Haven, Little Silver, Middletown, and Sea Bright directly; and it borders Oceanport and Monmouth Beach only by water.

== Demographics ==
Historical population
Census	Pop.	Note	%±
1910	1,449		—
1920	1,658		14.4%
1930	2,073		25.0%
1940	2,926		41.1%
1950	4,044		38.2%
1960	6,405		58.4%
1970	7,421		15.9%
1980	7,623		2.7%
1990	6,701		−12.1%
2000	7,137		6.5%
2010	7,122		−0.2%
2020	7,343		3.1%
2023 (est.)	7,178	▼	−2.2%
Population sources: 1910–1920; 1910 1910–1930; 1940–2000 2000; 2010 2020

=== 2020 census ===
As of the 2020 census, Rumson had a population of 7,343. The median age was 42.4 years. 29.4% of residents were under the age of 18 and 13.0% of residents were 65 years of age or older. For every 100 females there were 96.3 males, and for every 100 females age 18 and over there were 93.5 males age 18 and over.

100.0% of residents lived in urban areas, while 0.0% lived in rural areas.

There were 2,398 households in Rumson, of which 44.7% had children under the age of 18 living in them. Of all households, 70.9% were married-couple households, 8.7% were households with a male householder and no spouse or partner present, and 18.0% were households with a female householder and no spouse or partner present. About 14.7% of all households were made up of individuals and 7.1% had someone living alone who was 65 years of age or older.

There were 2,624 housing units, of which 8.6% were vacant. The homeowner vacancy rate was 1.4% and the rental vacancy rate was 2.0%.

Racial composition as of the 2020 census
Race	Number	Percent
White	6,718	91.5%
Black or African American	24	0.3%
American Indian and Alaska Native	9	0.1%
Asian	106	1.4%
Native Hawaiian and Other Pacific Islander	0	0.0%
Some other race	49	0.7%
Two or more races	437	6.0%
Hispanic or Latino (of any race)	308	4.2%

=== 2010 census ===
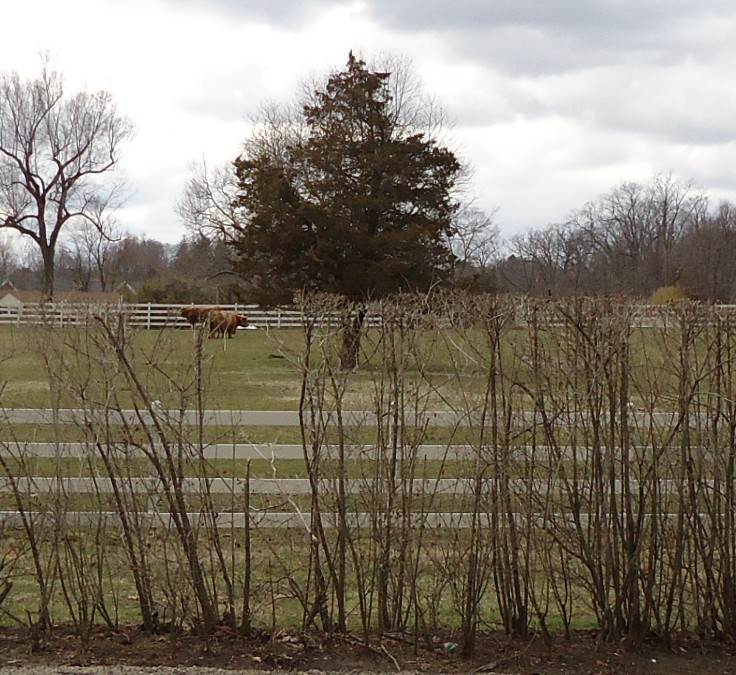
Cows on a property in Rumson

The 2010 United States census counted 7,122 people, 2,344 households, and 1,957 families in the borough. The population density was 1,408.0 per square mile (543.6/km^{2}). There were 2,585 housing units at an average density of 511.0 per square mile (197.3/km^{2}). The racial makeup was 97.22% (6,924) White, 0.25% (18) Black or African American, 0.07% (5) Native American, 1.26% (90) Asian, 0.03% (2) Pacific Islander, 0.15% (11) from other races, and 1.01% (72) from two or more races. Hispanic or Latino of any race were 2.43% (173) of the population.

Of the 2,344 households, 46.8% had children under the age of 18; 72.4% were married couples living together; 8.6% had a female householder with no husband present and 16.5% were non-families. Of all households, 14.3% were made up of individuals and 7.0% had someone living alone who was 65 years of age or older. The average household size was 3.03 and the average family size was 3.38.

32.5% of the population were under the age of 18, 5.7% from 18 to 24, 18.0% from 25 to 44, 32.4% from 45 to 64, and 11.3% who were 65 years of age or older. The median age was 41.6 years. For every 100 females, the population had 94.0 males. For every 100 females ages 18 and older there were 89.9 males.

The Census Bureau's 2006–2010 American Community Survey showed that (in 2010 inflation-adjusted dollars) median household income was $134,281 (with a margin of error of +/− $18,300) and the median family income was $157,188 (+/− $28,308). Males had a median income of $140,885 (+/− $25,278) versus $56,071 (+/− $16,014) for females. The per capita income for the borough was $79,388 (+/− $10,219). About 3.8% of families and 4.1% of the population were below the poverty line, including 6.1% of those under age 18 and none of those age 65 or over.

=== 2000 census ===
As of the 2000 United States census there were 7,137 people, 2,452 households, and 1,988 families residing in the borough. The population density was 1,366.0 inhabitants per square mile (527.4/km^{2}). There were 2,610 housing units at an average density of 499.5 per square mile (192.9/km^{2}). The racial makeup of the borough was 97.77% White, 0.24% African American, 0.06% Native American, 1.06% Asian, 0.36% from other races, and 0.50% from two or more races. Hispanic or Latino of any race were 1.39% of the population.

There were 2,452 households, out of which 44.2% had children under the age of 18 living with them, 71.3% were married couples living together, 7.8% had a female householder with no husband present, and 18.9% were non-families. 16.8% of all households were made up of individuals, and 7.9% had someone living alone who was 65 years of age or older. The average household size was 2.91 and the average family size was 3.29.

In the borough the population was spread out, with 31.9% under the age of 18, 3.5% from 18 to 24, 26.6% from 25 to 44, 25.2% from 45 to 64, and 12.8% who were 65 years of age or older. The median resident age was 39.2 years old. The median age was 39 years. For every 100 females, there were 93.9 males. For every 100 females age 18 and over, there were 89.6 males.

The median income for a household in the borough was $120,865, and the median income for a family was $140,668. Males had a median income of $100,000 versus $47,260 for females. The per capita income for the borough was $73,692. About 3.4% of families and 3.2% of the population were below the poverty line, including 2.4% of those under age 18 and 0.7% of those age 65 or over.

== Sports ==
The Seabright Lawn Tennis and Cricket Club, established in 1877, is the oldest continuously active tennis club in the United States.

== Parks and recreation ==
Public parks consist of Meadowridge Park, Piping Rock Park, Riverside Park, Rogers Park, "Teddy's Playground" at Victory Park, and West Park. Teddy's Playground was named after Edward “Teddy” Hall Gmelich, a 1-1/2-year-old who loved going to the park, and had died from a disease that had spread to his heart. The Rumson Country Club is a consolidation of the Rumson Polo Club and the Meadow Yacht Club and the Sea Bright Yacht Club. Bingham Hall serves as a center for social gatherings, recreational activities, and fundraisers.

== Government ==
=== Local government ===
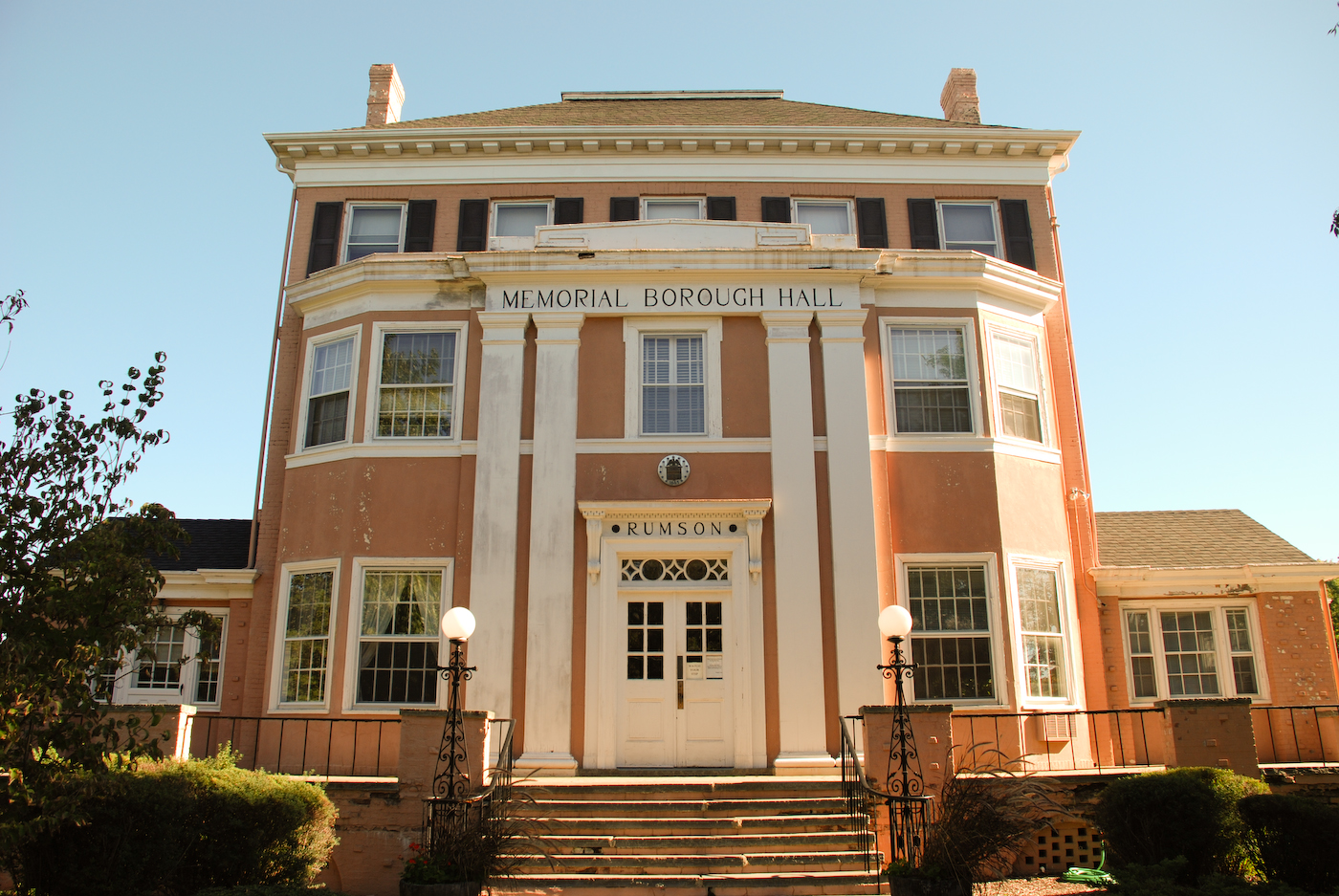
Rumson Borough Hall

Rumson is governed under the borough form of New Jersey municipal government, which is used in 218 municipalities (of the 564) statewide, making it the most common form of government in New Jersey. The governing body is comprised of the mayor and the borough council, with all positions elected at-large on a partisan basis as part of the November general election. A mayor is elected directly by the voters to a four-year term of office. The borough council includes six members elected to serve three-year terms on a staggered basis, with two seats coming up for election each year in a three-year cycle. The borough form of government used by Rumson is a "weak mayor / strong council" government in which council members act as the legislative body with the mayor presiding at meetings and voting only in the event of a tie. The mayor can veto ordinances subject to an override by a two-thirds majority vote of the council. The mayor makes committee and liaison assignments for council members, and most appointments are made by the mayor with the advice and consent of the council.

As of 2025, the Mayor of Rumson is Republican Joseph K. Hemphill, whose term of office ends on December 31, 2027. Members of the Borough Council are Council President John J. Conklin III (R, 2027), Gary Casazza (R, 2023), James Clayton Kingsbery (R, 2025), Michael F. Lospinuso (R, 2025), Sarah Pomphrey (R, 2027) and Linda J. Smith (R, 2026).

In January 2022, the borough council selected Michael F. Lospinuso from a list of three candidates nominated by the Republican municipal committee to fill the seat expiring in December 2022 that had been held by Laura R. Atwell until she resigned from office the previous December.

Councilmember Frank E. Shanley submitted a letter of resignation that took effect as of December 31, 2014, and was replaced in January 2015 by John J. Conklin III, who was selected by the borough council from a list of three candidates nominated by the Republican municipal committee.

In 2018, the borough had an average property tax bill of $20,602, the highest in the county, compared to an average bill of $8,767 statewide.

=== Federal, state, and county representation ===
Rumson is located in the 6th Congressional District and is part of New Jersey's 13th state legislative district.

For the 119th United States Congress, New Jersey's 6th congressional district is represented by Frank Pallone (D, Long Branch). New Jersey is represented in the United States Senate by Democrats Cory Booker (Newark, term ends 2027) and Andy Kim (Moorestown, term ends 2031).

For the 2026–2027 session, the 13th legislative district of the New Jersey Legislature is represented in the New Jersey Senate by Declan O'Scanlon (R, Little Silver) and in the General Assembly by Vicky Flynn (R, Holmdel Township) and Gerard Scharfenberger (R, Middletown Township).

Monmouth County is governed by a Board of County Commissioners composed of five members who are elected at-large to serve three-year terms of office on a staggered basis, with either one or two seats up for election each year as part of the November general election. At an annual reorganization meeting held in the beginning of January, the board selects one of its members to serve as director and another as deputy director.

As of 2025, Monmouth County's Commissioners are Director Thomas A. Arnone (R, Neptune City, 2025), Susan M. Kiley (R, Hazlet Township, 2027), Erik Anderson (R, Shrewsbury, 2026), Nick DiRocco (R, Wall Township, 2025), and Deputy Director Ross F. Licitra (R, Marlboro Township, 2026).

Constitutional officers elected on a countywide basis are Clerk Christine Giordano Hanlon (R, 2025; Ocean Township), Sheriff Shaun Golden (R, 2025; Howell Township) and Surrogate Rosemarie D. Peters (R, 2026; Middletown Township).

=== Politics ===
United States presidential election results for Rumson
Year	Republican		Democratic		Third party(ies)	
Year	No.	%	No.	%	No.	%
2024	2,512	55.83%	1,922	42.72%	65	1.44%
2020	2,423	50.68%	2,286	47.81%	72	1.51%
2016	2,131	54.91%	1,592	41.02%	158	4.07%
2012	2,446	68.21%	1,111	30.98%	29	0.81%
2008	2,470	60.76%	1,543	37.96%	52	1.28%
2004	2,590	63.98%	1,418	35.03%	40	0.99%
2000	2,226	60.55%	1,271	34.58%	179	4.87%
1996	2,134	59.94%	1,214	34.10%	212	5.96%
1992	2,062	57.60%	982	27.43%	536	14.97%

As of March 2011, there were a total of 5,166 registered voters in Rumson, of which 953 (18.4%) were registered as Democrats, 1,827 (35.4%) were registered as Republicans and 2,383 (46.1%) were registered as Unaffiliated. There were three voters registered as Libertarians or Greens.

In the 2016 Presidential election in Rumson, Republican Donald J. Trump received 54.9% (2,131 votes cast) in contrast with Democrat Hillary Rodham Clinton's 41.0% (1,592 votes cast). Other candidates received 4.0% (158 votes cast). In the previous 2012 presidential election, Republican Mitt Romney received 68.2% of the vote (2,446 cast), ahead of Democrat Barack Obama with 31.0% (1,111 votes), and other candidates with 0.8% (29 votes), among the 3,610 ballots cast by the borough's 5,384 registered voters (24 ballots were spoiled), for a turnout of 67.1%. In the 2008 presidential election, Republican John McCain received 59.7% of the vote (2,470 cast), ahead of Democrat Barack Obama with 37.3% (1,543 votes) and other candidates with 1.3% (52 votes), among the 4,136 ballots cast by the borough's 5,303 registered voters, for a turnout of 78.0%. In the 2004 presidential election, Republican George W. Bush received 63.8% of the vote (2,590 ballots cast), outpolling Democrat John Kerry with 34.9% (1,418 votes) and other candidates with 0.8% (40 votes), among the 4,060 ballots cast by the borough's 5,084 registered voters, for a turnout percentage of 79.9.

Gubernatorial election results for Rumson
Year	Republican		Democratic		Third party(ies)	
Year	No.	%	No.	%	No.	%
2025	2,184	61.21%	1,379	38.65%	5	0.14%
2021	2,007	64.14%	1,101	35.19%	21	0.67%
2017	1,410	61.46%	845	36.84%	39	1.70%
2013	1,925	80.24%	435	18.13%	39	1.63%
2009	2,019	71.80%	644	22.90%	149	5.30%
2005	1,731	65.20%	851	32.05%	73	2.75%

In the 2013 gubernatorial election, Republican Chris Christie received 80.2% of the vote (1,925 cast), ahead of Democrat Barbara Buono with 18.1% (435 votes), and other candidates with 1.6% (39 votes), among the 2,438 ballots cast by the borough's 5,330 registered voters (39 ballots were spoiled), for a turnout of 45.7%. In the 2009 gubernatorial election, Republican Chris Christie received 71.6% of the vote (2,019 ballots cast), ahead of Democrat Jon Corzine with 22.8% (644 votes), Independent Chris Daggett with 4.9% (138 votes) and other candidates with 0.4% (11 votes), among the 2,819 ballots cast by the borough's 5,139 registered voters, yielding a 54.9% turnout.

United States Senate election results for Rumson1
Year	Republican		Democratic		Third party(ies)	
Year	No.	%	No.	%	No.	%
2024	2,627	59.54%	1,740	39.44%	45	1.02%
2018	2,092	62.50%	1,179	35.23%	76	2.27%
2012	2,528	72.33%	938	26.84%	29	0.83%
2006	1,666	64.47%	873	33.78%	45	1.74%

United States Senate election results for Rumson2
Year	Republican		Democratic		Third party(ies)	
Year	No.	%	No.	%	No.	%
2020	2,691	56.42%	2,024	42.43%	55	1.15%
2014	1,245	65.46%	630	33.12%	27	1.42%
2013	864	63.07%	500	36.50%	6	0.44%
2008	2,568	66.56%	1,232	31.93%	58	1.50%

== Education ==
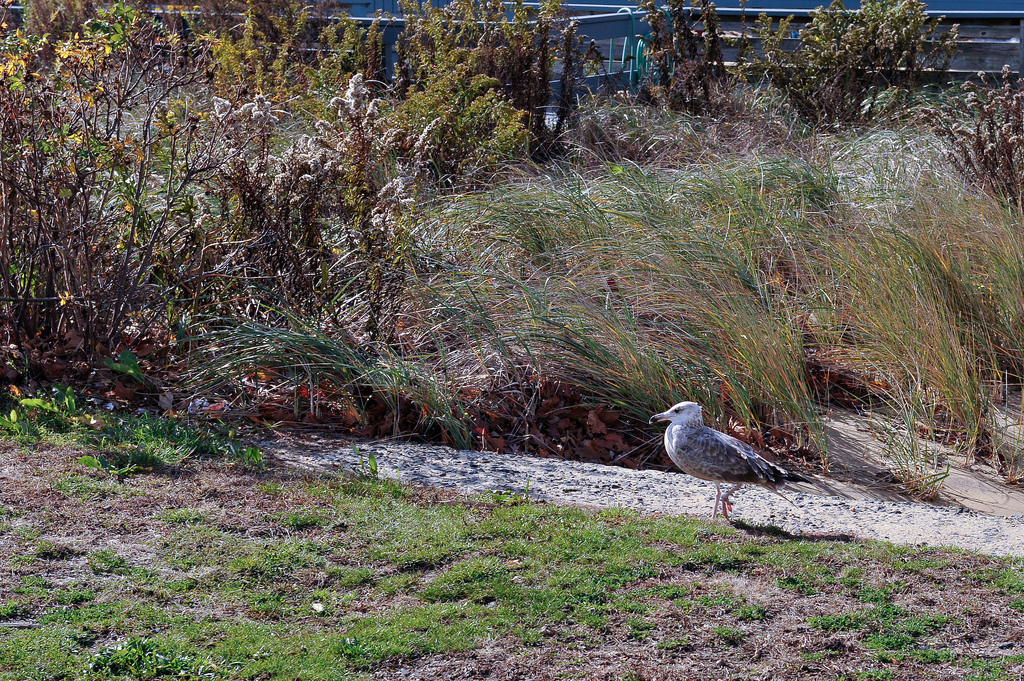
Wildlife on the Rumson shore

The Rumson School District serves public school students in pre-kindergarten through eighth grade. As of the 2022–23 school year, the district, comprised of two schools, had an enrollment of 911 students and 96.6 classroom teachers (on an FTE basis), for a student–teacher ratio of 9.4:1. Schools in the district (with 2022–23 enrollment data from the National Center for Education Statistics) are Deane-Porter Elementary School with 384 students in grades PreK-3 and Forrestdale School with 525 students in grade 4-8.

Public school students in ninth through twelfth grades attend Rumson-Fair Haven Regional High School, a regional, four-year comprehensive public high school serving students from both Fair Haven and Rumson, where the school is located. As of the 2022–23 school year, the high school had an enrollment of 876 students and 83.8 classroom teachers (on an FTE basis), for a student–teacher ratio of 10.5:1. In 2016, Newsweek ranked RFH the 144th best high school in the United States. Seats on the high school district's nine-member board of education are allocated based on the population of the constituent municipalities, with five seats assigned to Rumson.

Private schools in Rumson include Holy Cross School for grades K–8, which operates under the auspices of the Roman Catholic Diocese of Trenton. In 2015, Holy Cross School was one of 15 schools in New Jersey, and one of six private schools, recognized as a National Blue Ribbon School in the exemplary high performing category by the United States Department of Education.

Founded in 1926 and developed under the principles of its organizer B. Lord Buckley, Rumson Country Day School serves students in preschool through eighth grade and was recognized in 1998-99 by the National Blue Ribbon Schools Program.

== Transportation ==
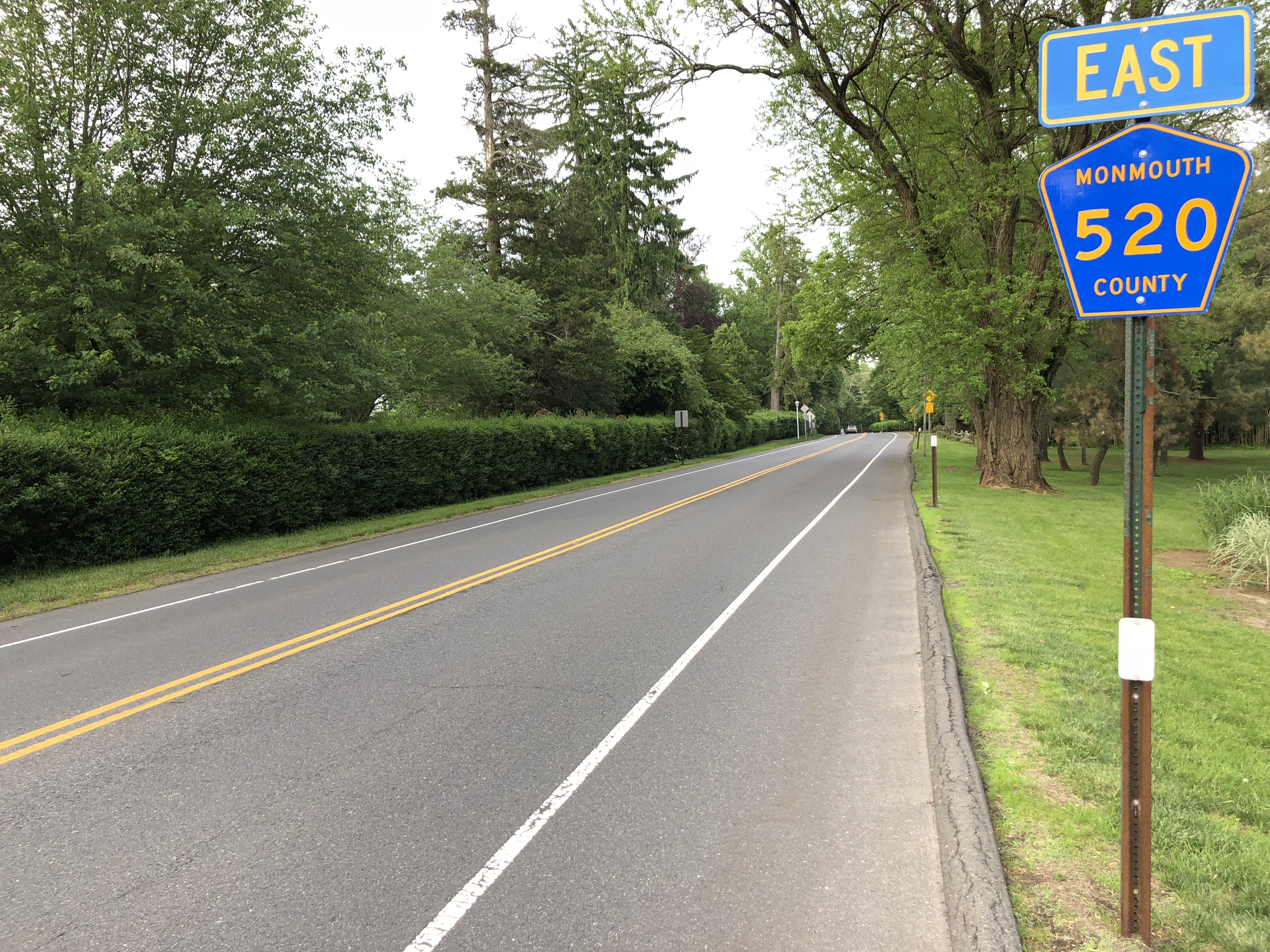
County Route 520 (Rumson Road) in Rumson

=== Roads and highways ===
As of May 2010, the borough had a total of 49.56 miles (79.76 km) of roadways, of which 40.15 miles (64.62 km) were maintained by the municipality and 9.41 miles (15.14 km) by Monmouth County.

No Interstate, U.S. or state highways directly serve Rumson. The most prominent road through the town is County Route 520 (Rumson Road).

=== Public transportation ===
Transportation to New York is available via NJ Transit's train service from stations at Little Silver or Red Bank. Commuter service is provided on the North Jersey Coast Line, offering express and local service. Diesel service operates from Hoboken Terminal to Bay Head station. Electric service operates from New York Penn Station to Long Branch, New Jersey, where the electrified portion of the line ends. Mid-line stations include Newark Penn Station, Newark Liberty International Airport Station, and Secaucus Junction.

Many of Rumson's residents work in the financial services industry and commute to Wall Street on the high-speed SeaStreak ferry that leaves from nearby Atlantic Highlands. The ferry ride is 40 minutes to the foot of Wall Street or an hour to Midtown Manhattan.

NJ Transit offers local bus service on the 835 route.

== Notable people ==
People who were born in, residents of, or otherwise closely associated with Rumson include:

- Edward Dean Adams (1846–1931), financier, benefactor of the Metropolitan Museum of Art, part-time resident
- Arthur Ashkin (1922–2020), scientist who won the Nobel Prize in Physics in 2018
- James C. Auchincloss (1885–1976), served eleven terms in the United States House of Representatives from 1943 to 1965 as a Republican from New Jersey's 3rd congressional district after being a member of the Rumson borough council from 1930 to 1937 and serving as Mayor of Rumson, New Jersey, from 1938 to 1943, when he was elected to Congress
- Bret Baier (born 1970), host of Special Report with Bret Baier on the Fox News Channel
- William Warren Barbour (1888–1943), represented New Jersey in the United States Senate from 1931 to 1937 and 1938–1943, in addition to serving as a member of the Rumson Borough Council in 1922 and as Mayor of Rumson, New Jersey, from 1923 to 1928
- Virginia Bauer (born 1956), lobbyist for families of the victims of the September 11 terror attacks who is a Commissioner of the Port Authority of New York and New Jersey
- Alfred N. Beadleston (1912–2000), served as Mayor of Shrewsbury, Speaker of the New Jersey General Assembly and President of the New Jersey Senate
- Jon Bon Jovi (born 1962), rock musician, actor and former resident, who lives along the Navesink River in Middletown (across the river from Rumson)
- Clifford G. Bond (born 1950), economist and former United States Ambassador to Bosnia and Herzegovina
- Dorothy Bond (1921–1952), soprano
- Matthew Borden (1842–1912), textile company owner
- Edward Bowes (1874–1946), creator and host of Major Bowes Amateur Hour
- Bill Britton (born 1955), professional golfer
- Martha Davis Coe (1907–1986), musician, composer, PR executive and inventor
- John M. Corlies (1868–1926), Mayor of Rumson who served on the Monmouth County Board of Chosen Freeholders
- Marshall Criser (born 1928), President of the University of Florida from 1984 to 1989
- Peter Hood Ballantine Cumming (1910–1988), Mayor of Rumson in the 1950s
- Pete Dawkins (born 1938), former U.S. Army Brigadier General, Heisman Trophy winner, Rhodes Scholar and businessman who ran in 1988 for the United States Senate seat held by Frank Lautenberg, losing 54%–46%
- Lewis Eisenberg (born 1942), United States Ambassador to Italy and San Marino since 2017
- Christian William Feigenspan (1876–1939), brewer
- Randy Foye (born 1983), NBA point guard for the Oklahoma City Thunder
- Vic Ghezzi (1910–1976), professional golfer
- James P. Gordon (1928–2013), physicist known for his work in optics and quantum electronics
- Mason Welch Gross (1911–1977), quiz show personality and academic who served as the sixteenth President of Rutgers University
- Siobhan Fallon Hogan (born 1961), actress who appeared on film in Forrest Gump, Men in Black and The Negotiator and was a former cast member of Saturday Night Live
- Kevork Hovnanian (1923–2009), businessman and home builder, founder of Hovnanian Enterprises
- Deborah Lee James (born 1958), 23rd Secretary of the Air Force
- Kristjan Järvi (born 1972), conductor
- Neeme Järvi (born 1937), Estonian-born conductor who emigrated to the United States and settled in Rumson, with his musician sons Paavo and Kristjan
- Paavo Järvi (born 1962), conductor
- James F. Kelley (1902–1996), President of Seton Hall College (now Seton Hall University) from 1936 to 1949
- Brian Kennedy, head coach for the NJIT Highlanders men's basketball team
- Queen Latifah (born 1970), actress
- Tingye Li (1931–2012), Chinese-American scientist known for his work in the fields of microwaves, lasers and optical communication
- Catarina Lindqvist (born 1963), former professional tennis player
- Heather Locklear (born 1961), actress, lived in Rumson while married to Richie Sambora
- Phyllis Stadler Lyon, former field hockey player who played on the U.S. women's national field hockey team
- Enrique Marcatili (1925–2021), winner of the IEEE's Baker Prize and pioneer in optical fiber research
- Rob Margolies (born 1983), film director and screenwriter
- Robert H. McCarter (1859–1941), New Jersey Attorney General from 1903 to 1908
- Thomas N. McCarter (1867–1955), New Jersey Attorney General from 1902 to 1903
- Jane Milmore (born 1955), playwright
- Jennifer Milmore (born 1969), actress
- Gloria Monty (1921–2006), television producer best known for her work in the field of soap operas, most notably her tenure at General Hospital
- John A. Mulheren (1949–2003), philanthropist and Wall Street financier
- Ryan Murphy (born 1983), former professional ice hockey player who was drafted by the Los Angeles Kings in the 2002 NHL entry draft
- Bob Ojeda (born 1957), former pitcher in the major leagues, pitched for the Mets, Yankees, Indians, Red Sox and Dodgers from 1980 to 1994
- James S. Parkes (1897–1985), politician, who served on the Red Bank Borough Council and as a member of the Monmouth County Board of Chosen Freeholders
- Rob Petitti (born 1982), offensive tackle for the New Orleans Saints of the NFL
- Charlie Puth (born 1991), singer-songwriter and record producer
- Stephen Puth (born 1994), singer-songwriter
- Jim Quirk (born c. 1945), NFL on-field official from 1988 to 2008
- James Randi (1928–2020), "The Amazing Randi", stage magician and scientific skeptic Randi lived in small house in Rumson in the 1960s, whose premises included a sign that read: "Randi — charlatan".
- Leah Ray (1915–1999), big band singer and actress
- Nelson Riddle (1921–1985), arranger and composer. Riddle spent his summers as a teen in Rumson and attended high school in Rumson during his senior year
- Bill Robinson (1918–2007), sailor and author about sailing
- Richie Sambora (born 1959), guitarist for Bon Jovi
- Patti Scialfa (born 1953), singer-songwriter
- Henry Selick (born 1952), stop motion director, producer and writer who is best known for directing The Nightmare Before Christmas, James and the Giant Peach and Coraline
- George A. Sheehan (1918–1993), cardiologist who authored numerous books on running and life, including the New York Times best seller Running & Being
- Bruce Springsteen (born 1949), rock 'n roll musician
- Melissa Stark (born 1973), television personality and sportscaster who works as a reporter for the NFL Network
- Meghan Tierney (born 1997), snowboarder who has been selected to compete in snowboardcross for the United States at the 2018 Winter Olympics in Pyeongchang and also in Beijing in the 2022 Winter Olympics
- Lynn Tilton (born 1959), businesswoman
- Sonny Werblin (1910–1991), sports executive
- Phillip Wheeler (born 2002), professional basketball player for the Philadelphia 76ers
- Alice White (1908–2007), award-winning author, playwright, editor, teacher and performer
- James R. Zazzali (born 1937), former chief justice of the New Jersey Supreme Court

== Gallery ==
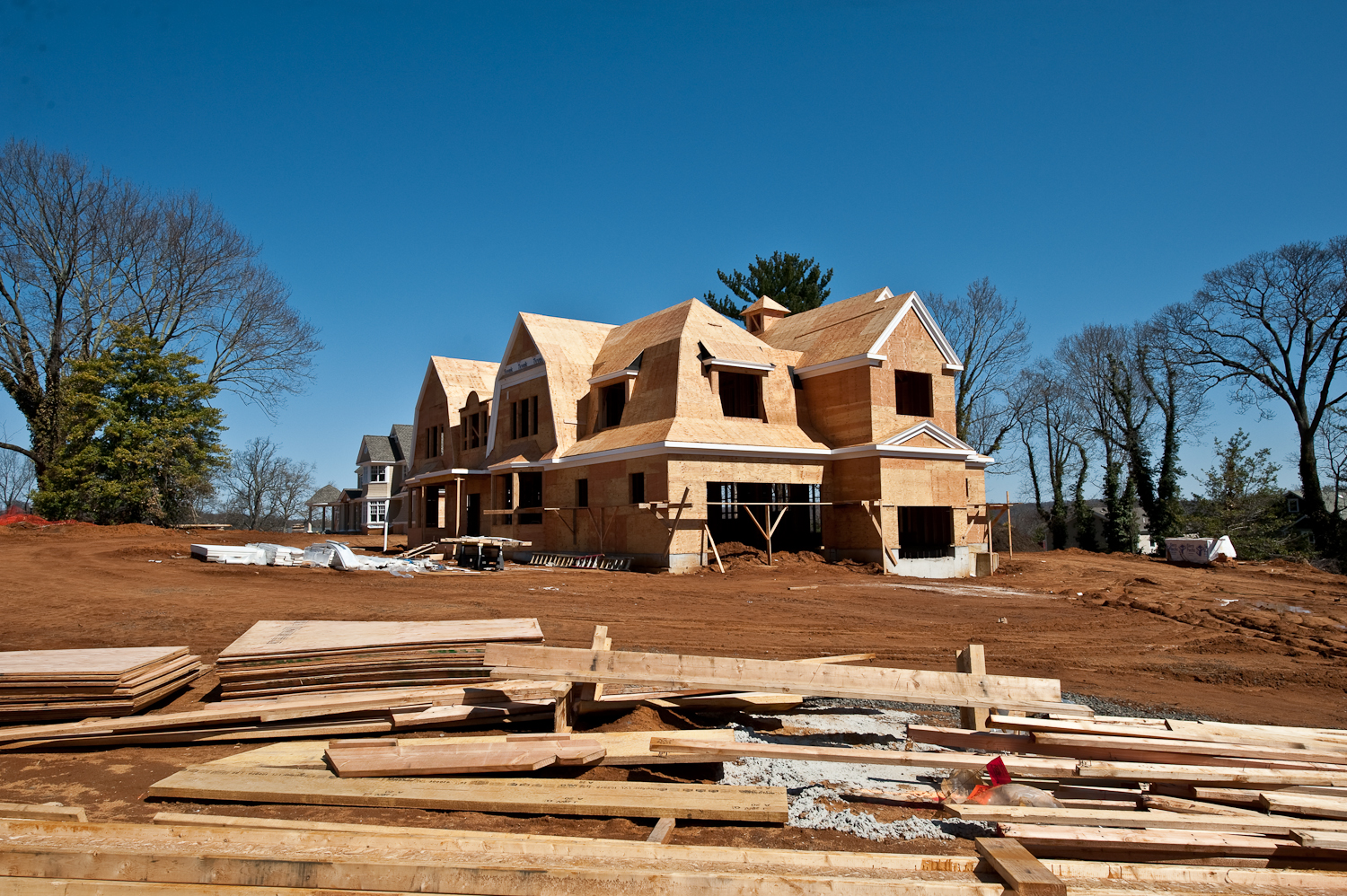
New home construction in Rumson

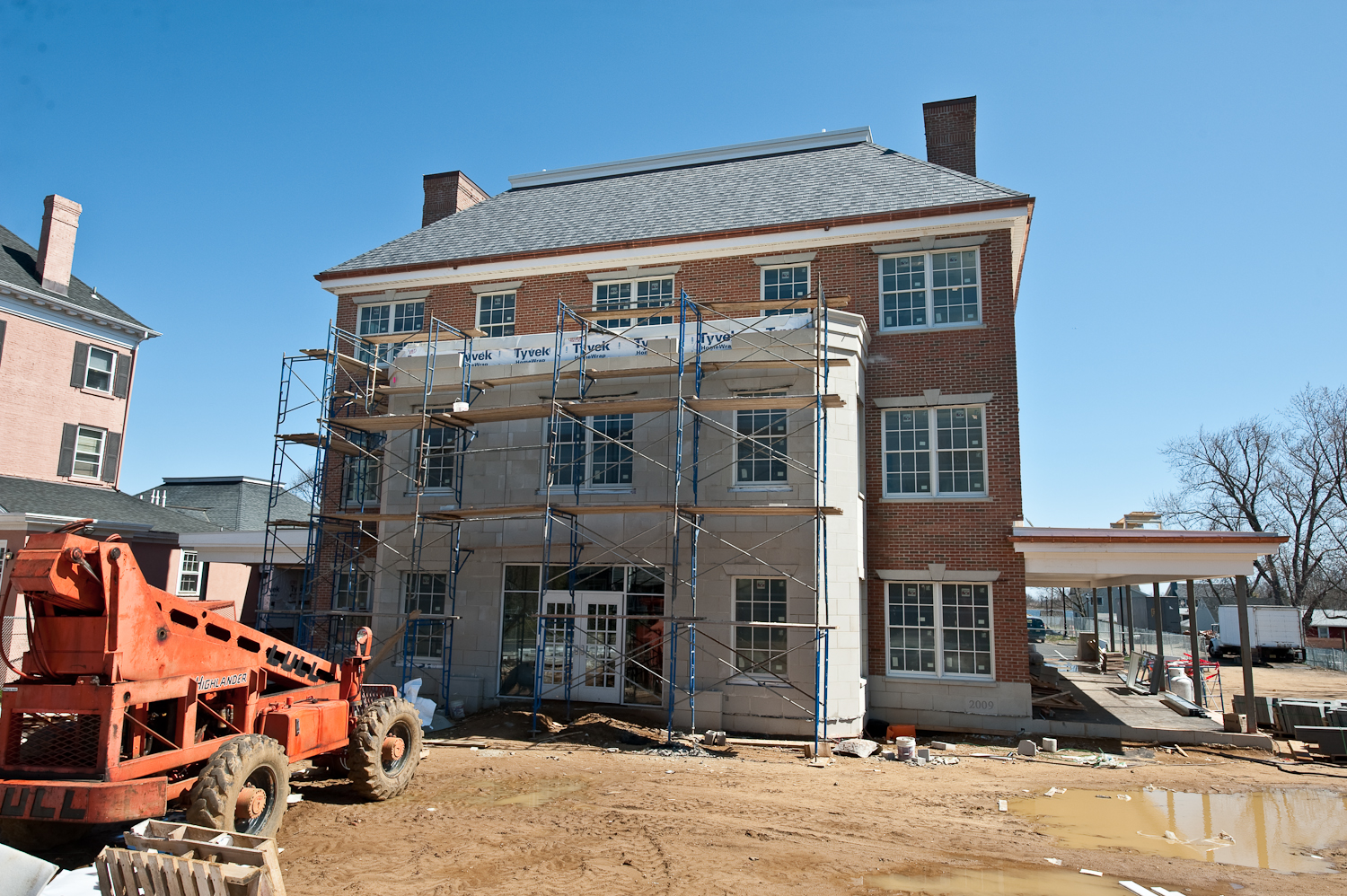
New borough hall construction

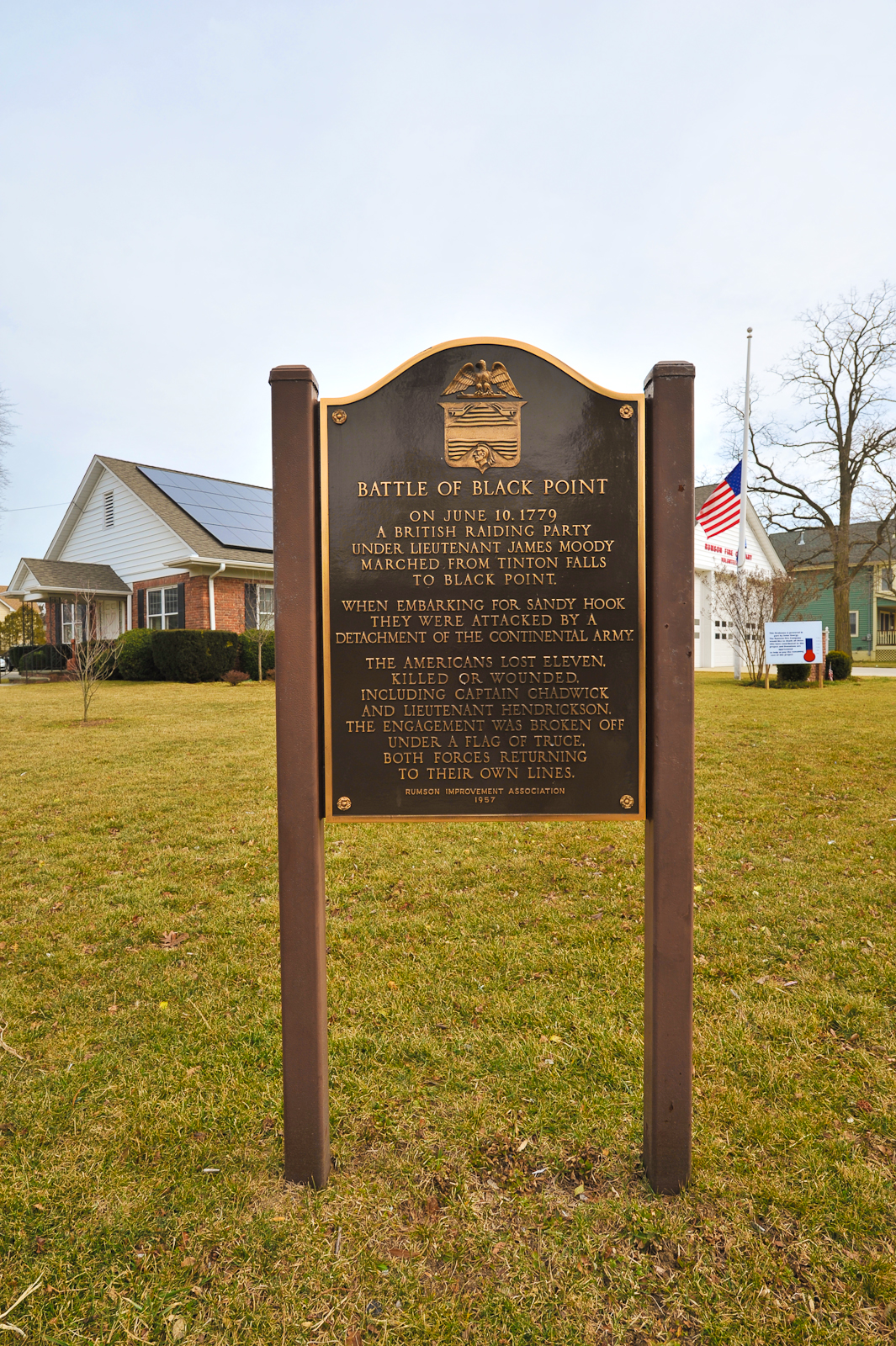
Battle of Black Point historical marker

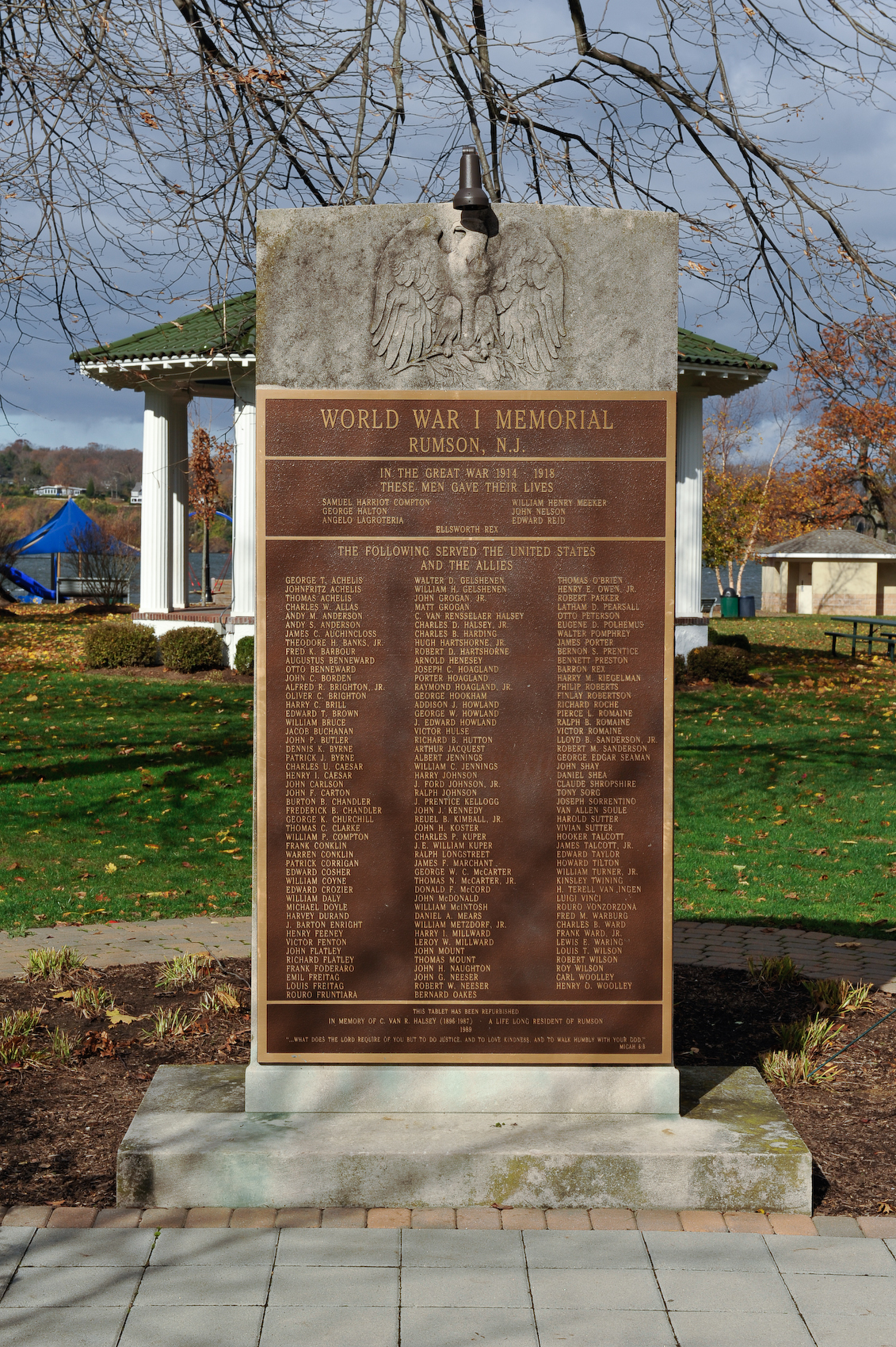
Rumson World War I memorial

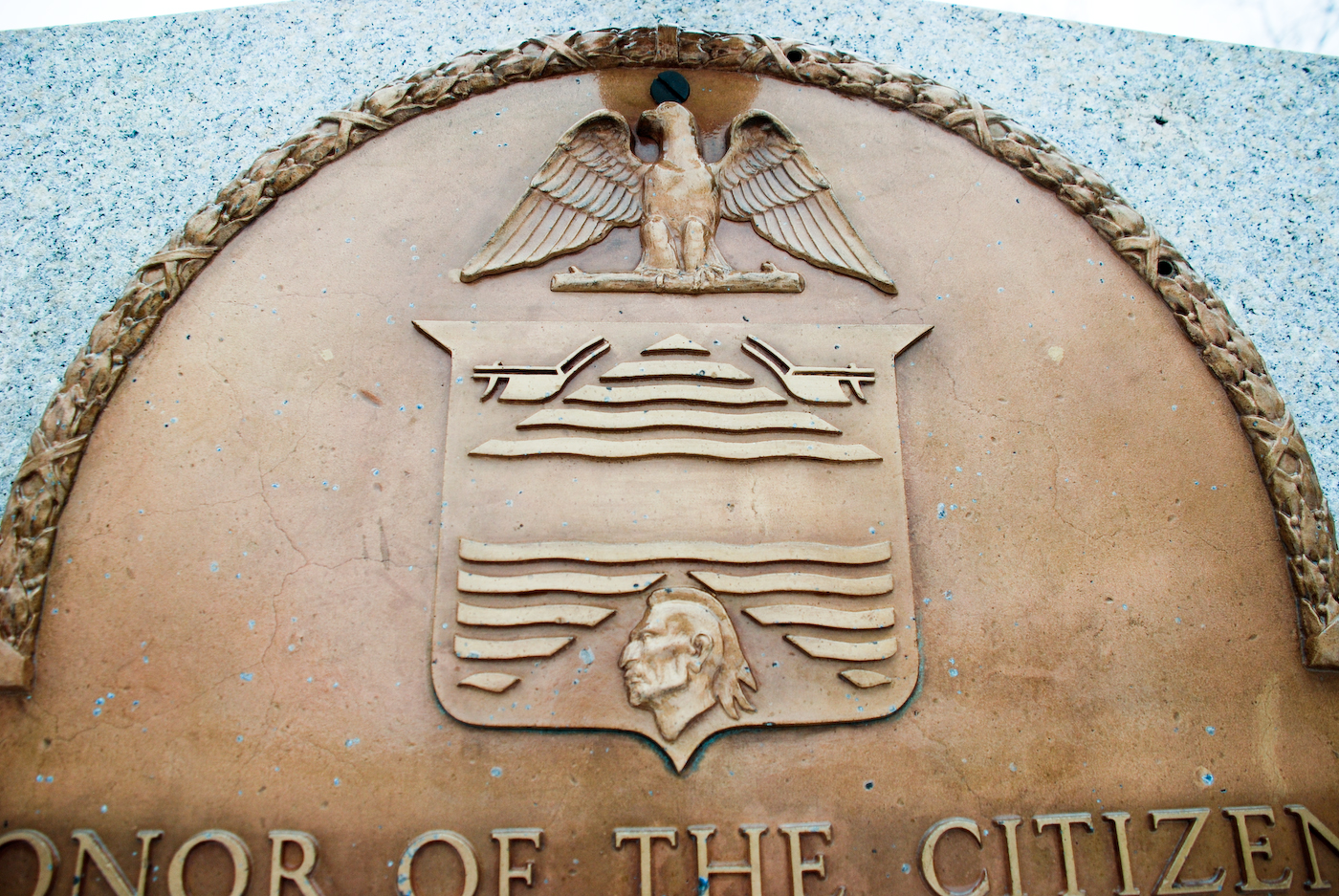
Rumson shield
