= Bill Robinson (author) =

American sailor, author and editor

William Wheeler Robinson
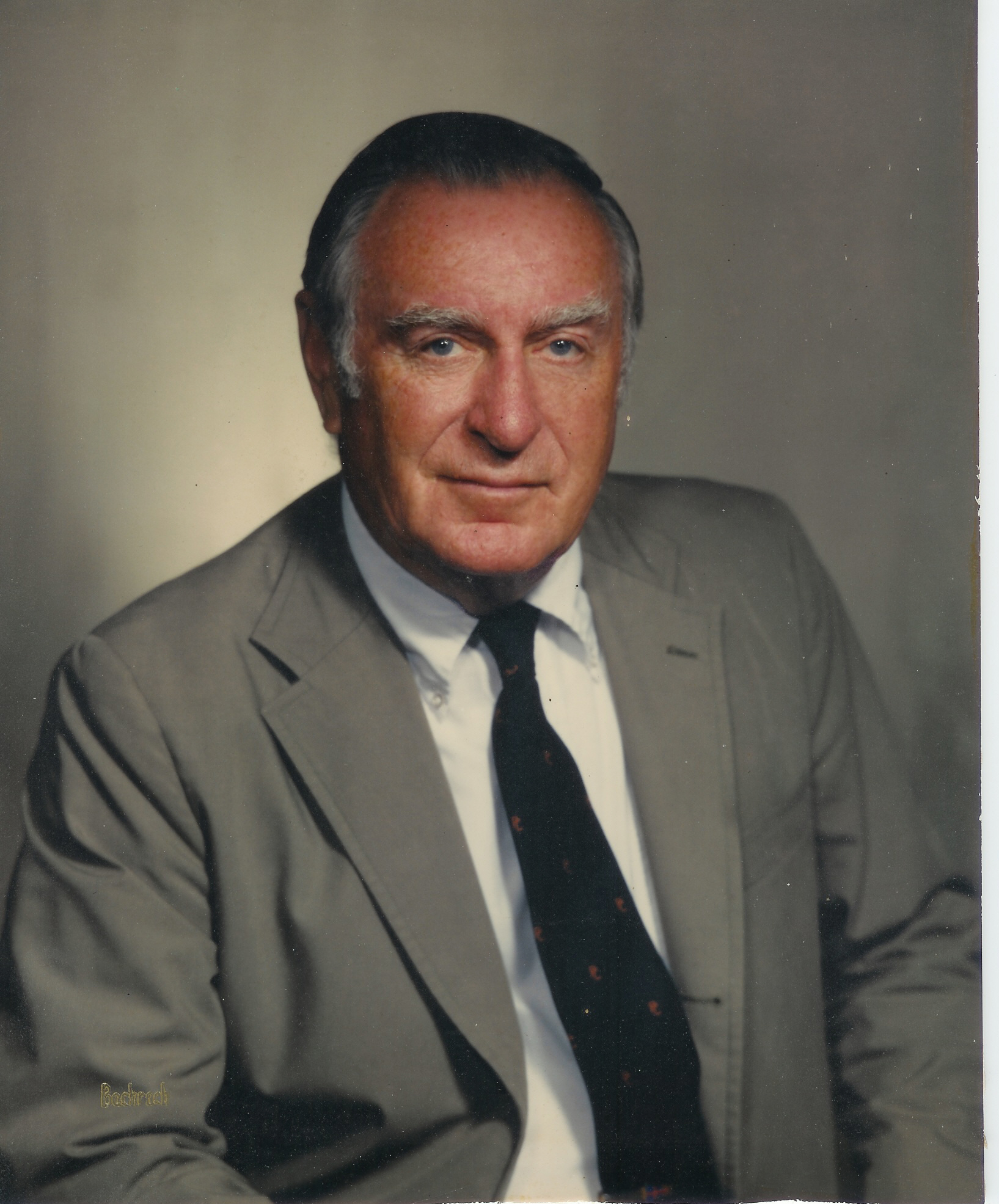
- Born: October 4, 1918; Elizabeth, New Jersey, U.S.A.
- Died: April 3, 2007 (aged 88); Red Bank, New Jersey, U.S.A.
- Occupations: editor, writer
- Writing career
- Genres: Nautical, Reference, How To

William Wheeler Robinson (October 4, 1918 – April 3, 2007) was an American sailor, author and editor well known in the national and international sailing community for his 27 nautical books, speaking engagements, and contributions to nautical publications.

Robinson was born in Elizabeth, New Jersey, and attended Princeton University from 1935 to 1939, graduating with a degree in English. He received a commission in the United States Naval Reserve in 1941 and served as an officer until 1945. He commanded a 110-foot wooden Navy subchaser - hull number SC 743 - in the Pacific theater during World War II - serving honorably in troop and ship convoys and in the invasions of Arawe, New Britain and Hollandia. LTjg Robinson was awarded the Bronze Star (with gold star denoting a second award) for his command's performance under air attack. He was a sportswriter at the Newark Evening News (1947–1955) and then the Newark Star Ledger (1955–1957) following his return to civilian life. He developed a nationally syndicated boating column while at the Star Ledger.

Robinson was an associate editor of Yachting magazine from 1957 to 1967 and executive editor from 1967 to 1978. He served as an editor-at-large for Yachting from 1978 to 1986, when the publisher was sold. He then served as an editor-at-large for the competing Cruising World magazine from 1987 to 1996.

Throughout his career and his retirement Robinson traveled extensively as a writer, sailing cruiser and racer. He wrote sailing and nautical-themed books and contributed articles to numerous professional journals. He served as a speaker and featured guest on cruises and at sailing events worldwide. With his late wife, Jane Dimock Robinson (deceased 1997), he lived in Rumson, New Jersey from 1946 to 2002 and maintained a boat and winter residence in Tortola, British Virgin Islands throughout his retirement.

== Bibliography ==
- The Science of Sailing (1960)
- New Boat (1961)
- A Berth to Bermuda (1961)
- Where the Trade Winds Blow (1963)
- Expert Sailing (1965)
- Over the Horizon (1966)
- The World of Yachting (1966)
- Better Sailing for Boys and Girls (1968)
- The America's Cup Races (1970 revised edition of Herbert Lawrence Stone's 1914 book)
- Legendary Yachts (1971, revised 1978)
- The Sailing Life (1974)
- Right Boat for You (1974)
- Great American Yacht Designers (1974)
- America's Sailing Book (1976)
- A Sailor's Tales (1978)
- Cruising, the Boats and the Places (1981)
- South to the Caribbean (1981)
- Where to Cruise (1984)
- Islands (1985)
- Caribbean Cruising Handbook (1986)
- 80 Years of Yachting (1987)
- Cruising the Easy Way (1990)
- Best Sailing Spots Worldwide (1991)
- Destruction at Noonday (1992, historical fiction)
- The Sailing Mystique (1994)
- A Winter in the Sun (1995)
