= Woody Erdman =

American sportscaster and television producer

Ellis E. "Woody" Erdman (April 16, 1926, Ashland, Pennsylvania – February 10, 1997, Greensboro, North Carolina) was an American sportscaster, television producer, and businessman who served as chairman of Trans-National Communications, International Trade & Commerce Corporation and the Boston Celtics.

Erdman was a combat veteran of World War II, having served with the US Army Air Corps from 1944 to the V-J Day. He was a crew member on several B-29s based on the island of Tinian, and received the Air Medal with oak leaf cluster. He remained in the Air Force Reserve until after the birth of his third child, and received an Honorable Discharge at the rank of 1st Lieutenant.

Erdman's career in broadcasting began while he was a student at Penn State University in the late 1940s, and worked at several radio stations in central Pennsylvania, where he met his future wife, Phebe Mae Weeks, and they were married in 1948. In 1952 they moved to Elmira, New York, where Erdman worked for WELM, a Gannett radio station. In 1956, he co-founded WTKO radio in Ithaca, New York with Thomas Cassell and a group of investors, and the family moved to Ithaca. On February 1, 1960, Erdman purchased the Rural Radio Network, an interconnected group of six commercial FM radio stations spread across upstate New York. In addition to owning radio stations, Erdman was also a radio play-by-play announcer for the New York Giants football team.

Erdman was also involved in the ownership of sports teams. Erdman's Trans-National Communications were the majority owners of the Boston Celtics of the National Basketball Association from 1969 to 1971 and the Oakland Seals of the National Hockey League during the 1969-70 NHL season. Erdman was also the owner of the Carolina Cardinals of the United States Basketball League.

A 1996 investigation of Ellis Erdman and his International Trade & Commerce Corporation by the Securities and Exchange Commission accused Erdman of being a "confidence man." As chairman of ITC, Erdman was believed to have "orchestrated a classic "pump and dump" scheme," but died in 1997 before ever tried in court.

Erdman was married to Phebe Weeks Erdman from 1949 until their divorce in 1985. The couple was reunited in 1992 and were together until his death. They had three children. The Erdmans were residents of Ithaca, New York.

Preceded by Ballantine Brewery	Boston Celtics principal owner 1969–1971	Succeeded by Ballantine Brewery
