= Mayors of Rumson, New Jersey =

Number of mayors of Rumson, New Jersey by party affiliation^{[A]}
Party	Mayors
Democratic	1
Republican	8
undetermined	8

Rumson, New Jersey, was incorporated on June 18, 1907. It is governed under the borough form of New Jersey municipal government. The governing body consists of a mayor and a borough council comprising six council members, with all positions elected at-large on a partisan basis as part of the November general election. A mayor is elected directly by the voters to a four-year term of office. The borough council consists of six members elected to serve three-year terms on a staggered basis, with two seats coming up for election each year in a three-year cycle. The borough form of government used by Rumson, the most common system used in the state, is a "weak mayor / strong council" government in which council members act as the legislative body with the mayor presiding at meetings and voting only in the event of a tie. The mayor can veto ordinances subject to an override by a two-thirds majority vote of the council. The mayor makes committee and liaison assignments for council members, and most appointments are made by the mayor with the advice and consent of the council.

Frank McMahon was the first mayor of Rumson, New Jersey. The current mayor of Rumson, New Jersey, is John E. Ekdahl.

== Mayors ==
Democratic (1) Republican (8) undetermined (8)

#	Mayor	Took office	Left office	Party	Notes
1	Frank McMahon	June 18, 1907	1909	undetermined	Frank McMahon was the first mayor of Rumson, New Jersey.
2	John Minton Corlies	1910	1921	Democratic	He also served as the Director of the Monmouth County, New Jersey Board of Chosen Freeholders.
3	William H. Mahoney	1922	1923	undetermined	
4	William Warren Barbour	1924	1929	Republican	Amateur heavyweight boxing champion; later served in the United States Senate.
5	Van R. Halsey	1930	1935	undetermined	
6	Neilson Edwards	1936	1937	undetermined	
7	James Coats Auchincloss	1938	1942	Republican	Later served in the United States House of Representatives.
8	Louis M. Hague	1943	1947	undetermined	
9	J. Edward Wilson	1948	1949	undetermined	
10	Peter Hood Ballantine Cumming	1950	1951	undetermined	Previously a business executive.
11	Francis J. Nary	1952	1957	undetermined	
12	Peter Cartmell	1958	1961	Republican	
13	Charles S. Callman	1962	1967	Republican	This was his first term.
14	John O. Teeter	1968	1980	Republican	
15	Charles Francis Paterno	1980	October 1, 1989	Republican	
16	Charles S. Callman	October 12, 1989	December 31, 2003	Republican	This was his second term.
17	John E. Ekdahl	January 1, 2004	incumbent	Republican	John E. Ekdahl is the current mayor of Rumson, New Jersey. He has been serving for 22 years, 58 days.

Notes

A. Table only includes Borough mayors. 17 people have served as mayor, one twice; the table includes this non-consecutive term as well.
