= Oceanic, New Jersey =

Populated place in Monmouth County, New Jersey, US

- Unincorporated community
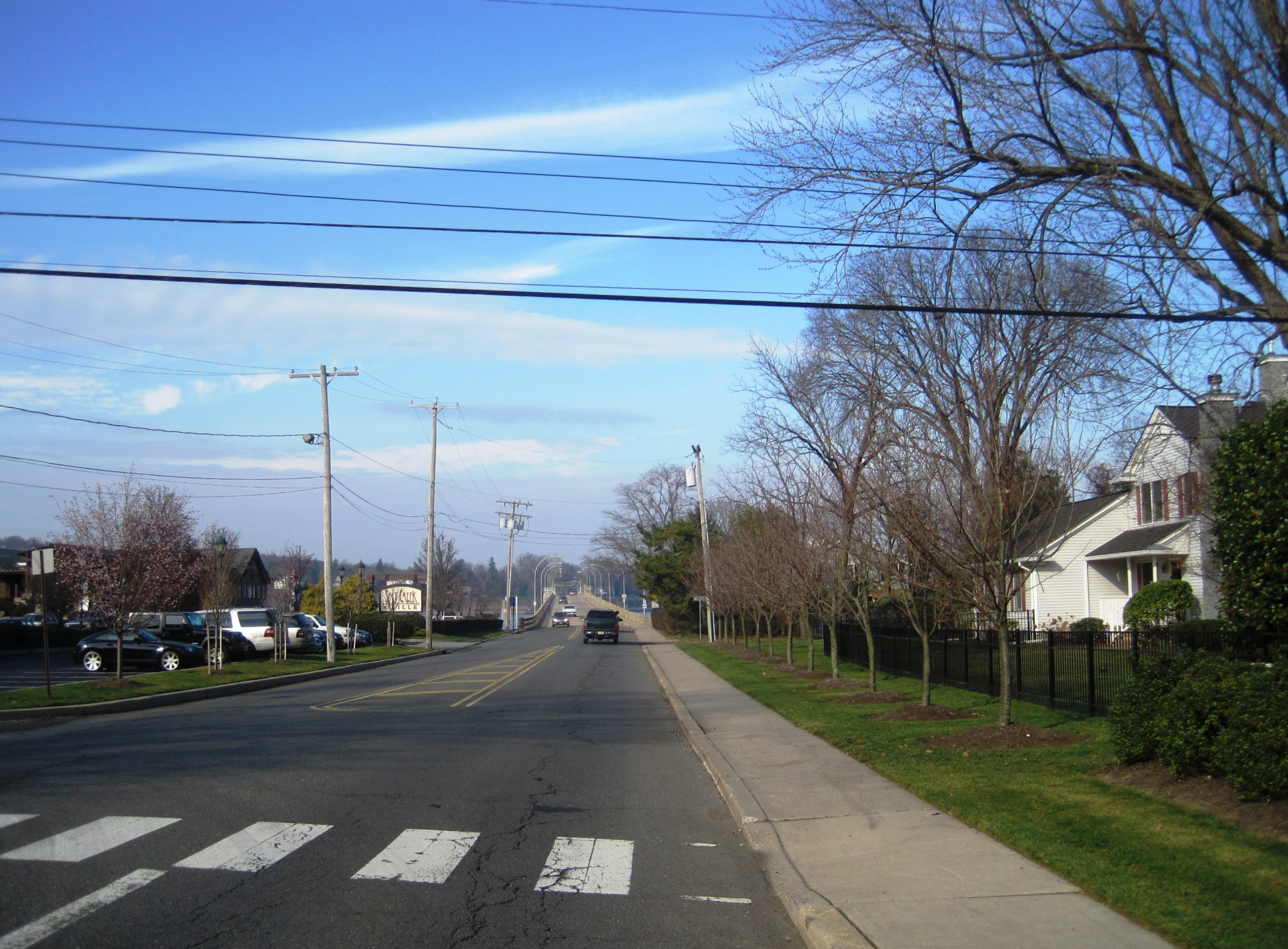
- Looking north on Bingham Avenue (CR 8A) towards the Oceanic Bridge

- Location of Oceanic in Monmouth County Inset: Location of county within the state of New Jersey Oceanic (New Jersey) Oceanic (the United States)
- Coordinates: 40°22′40″N 74°00′38″W
- Country: United States
- State: New Jersey
- County: Monmouth
- Borough: Rumson
- Elevation: 10 ft (3.0 m)
- GNIS feature ID: 882680

Oceanic is an unincorporated community located within Rumson in Monmouth County, in the U.S. state of New Jersey. Located on the north side of the borough, Oceanic contains most of Rumson's commercial businesses mainly along Bingham Avenue (County Route 8A) and River Road (CR 10). Bingham Avenue connects directly to the Oceanic Bridge over the Navesink River to the Middletown Township community of Locust Point.
