= Marjorie Brown =

American businesswoman (1911–2000)

Marjorie Dennison Hall Brown (April 20, 1911 – November 23, 2000, in Sarasota, Florida) was the owner of the Boston Celtics following the death of her husband Walter A. Brown.

After the death of Walter A. Brown, the Celtics' ownership was split 50/50 between minority owner Louis Pieri and Brown's widow Marjorie Brown. Brown and Pieri sold their interest in the Celtics on June 24, 1965, to the Ruppert Knickerbocker Brewing Company, a subsidiary of Marvin Kratter's National Equities.

Preceded by Walter A. Brown	Boston Celtics principal owner with Louis Pieri; 1964–1965	Succeeded by National Equities
