= Peter Hood Ballantine Cumming =

American politician (1910–1988)

Peter Hood Ballantine Cumming (August 1, 1910 – November 16, 1988) was an executive in several firms and served as Mayor of Rumson, New Jersey from 1950 to 1951.

== Personal life ==
He was born on August 1, 1910. He was the great-grandson of Peter Ballantine. Cumming was the son of Robert W. Cumming. He attended St. Mark's School and then Princeton University where he was on the rowing team and the sailing team. He married Dorothy Classen, daughter of Henry Washington Classon. They had three daughters, Dorothy, Diane, and Susan.

He died of cancer on November 16, 1988 in Little Silver, New Jersey.

== Career ==
He was Mayor of Rumson, New Jersey from 1950 to 1951. In 1953 he was president of the Rumson Improvement Association. In 1959 he became the director of new business and public relations at H.A. Caesar & Company.

In 1966 he left H.A. Caesar & Company to join the Textile Banking Company. He was president of the Textile Banking Company from 1966 until 1968. He then became an executive of the Iselin-Jefferson Financial Company, a subsidiary of Dan River Mills. He was president of the Textile Banking Company, a vice president and director of the Iselin-Jefferson Financial Company, and a general partner in H. A. Caesar & Company, a factoring business in Manhattan. He was executive vice president and manager of marketing at J. P. Maguire.
