= Marvin Kratter =

American businessman (1915–1999)

- Born: November 9, 1915; Brooklyn, New York
- Died: October 24, 1999 (aged 83); Encinitas, California
- Education: B.A. Brooklyn College; J.D. Brooklyn Law School
- Spouse: Lillian Rosenbloom
- Children: Leslie Kratter; David E. Kratter; Sherry Santa Cruz

Marvin Kratter (born November 9, 1915, in Brooklyn, died October 24, 1999, in Encinitas, California) was a New York-based real estate developer who was the head of the Kratter Corporation, National Equities, Countrywide Realty, Knickerbocker Brewery, Rom-American Pharmaceuticals, and the Boston Celtics.

== Biography ==
Born to a Jewish family, Kratter graduated from Brooklyn College (1937) and Brooklyn Law School (1939). Kratter started his career as a certified public accountant in New York City. He moved to Tucson, Arizona in the 1930s and he started a dude ranch, Rancho del Rio Estates, in 1945. Kratter's ranch went bankrupt in 1949 and he moved back to New York City, where he became one of the first to practice real estate syndication.

Kratter bought Ebbets Field from Brooklyn Dodgers owner Walter O'Malley for about $2,000,000 on October 31, 1956. The deal included a five-year lease that allowed the Dodgers to move out as soon as a proposed Downtown Brooklyn stadium was ready for business and Kratter to raze the ballpark and redevelop the land for a $25 million housing project beginning in 1961. The team left for Los Angeles after the 1957 season.

After purchasing the air rights to the Trans-Manhattan Expressway entrance to the George Washington Bridge on the Manhattan side, Kratter built the Bridge Apartments in 1961. The project consisted of four 32-story buildings built over the expressway and were some of the first aluminum-sheathed high-rise structures built in the world.

In 1960, Kratter demolished Ebbets Field and in 1962, built the 1,327-apartment Ebbets Field Apartments under the Mitchell-Lama program which gave developers tax breaks and low-interest mortgages to build middle-class housing. Kratter also developed the St. Tropez, one of the first condominium apartment buildings in the city and owned the St. Regis Hotel and the Knickerbocker Brewery.

From 1965 to 1968, Kratter was the owner of the Boston Celtics. Kratter also speculated in land in Las Vegas. He was also one of the developers of Rodeo Drive in Beverly Hills.

== Personal life ==
He was married to Lillian Rosenbloom. In 1977, Kratter released a solo album What I Did for Love under the name Mark Matthews. They had two sons, Leslie Kratter and David E. Kratter, and a daughter, Sherry Santa Cruz.

Preceded by Lou Pieri and Marjorie Brown	Boston Celtics principal owner 1965–1968	Succeeded by Ballantine Brewery
