= Trans-National Communications =

American holding company

Trans-National Communications, Inc. was a New York City based holding company that owned the Boston Celtics of the National Basketball Association and the Oakland Seals of the National Hockey League.

Trans-National Communications was founded in 1968 by Ellis E. "Woody" Erdman, a radio station owner, and William Creasy, a television producer for CBS Sports. Erdman wanted to create an investment group with former professional athletes and use their celebrity power to sell the product. TNC's celebrity investors were Pat Summerall, Whitey Ford, Dick Lynch, and Jim Katcavage.

Trans-National Communications holdings included over 100 radio stations, the radio broadcast rights to the New York Jets and the New York Giants, the Bank of Philadelphia, film companies, and farms.

On March 2, 1969, Trans-National Communications purchased the Oakland Seals from Barry Van Gerbig for $4.5 million. TNC's control of the Seals ended after one season after they missed a payment to van Gerbig and fell into default.

On August 13, 1969, Trans-National Communications purchased the Boston Celtics for a record $6 million. TNC and its president Woody Erdman attempted to use profits from the Celtics to cover the losses from the company's bad investments. As a result, the team struggled to pay its bills. Some businesses refused to take checks from the Celtics while TNC owned them and General Manager Red Auerbach had to pay some bills out of his own pocket. Auerbach described Erdman as "the absolute worst" owner he had ever worked for. Control of the team reverted to Investors Funding Corporation in 1971 after TNC fell into financial default.

In 1972, Trans-National Communications filed for Chapter 11 bankruptcy.
