= P. Ballantine and Sons Brewing Company =

American brewery founded 1840

- Industry: Alcoholic beverage
- Founded: 1840 in Newark, New Jersey
- Founder: Peter Ballantine
- Headquarters: Los Angeles, California
- Products: Beer
- Owner: Pabst Brewing Company

P. Ballantine & Sons Brewing Company is a beer brand that was founded in 1845 in Newark, New Jersey. At its peak in the mid-20th century, it was the third-largest brewer in the United States, trailing only Anheuser-Busch and Schlitz. The brand is currently owned and operated by Pabst Brewing Company. Throughout history, it is best known for its Ballantine XXX Ale.

== History ==
=== Ballantine era ===
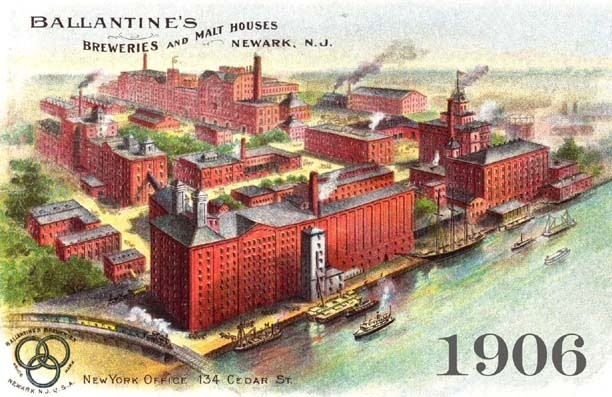
Ballantine brewery in Newark, New Jersey 1906

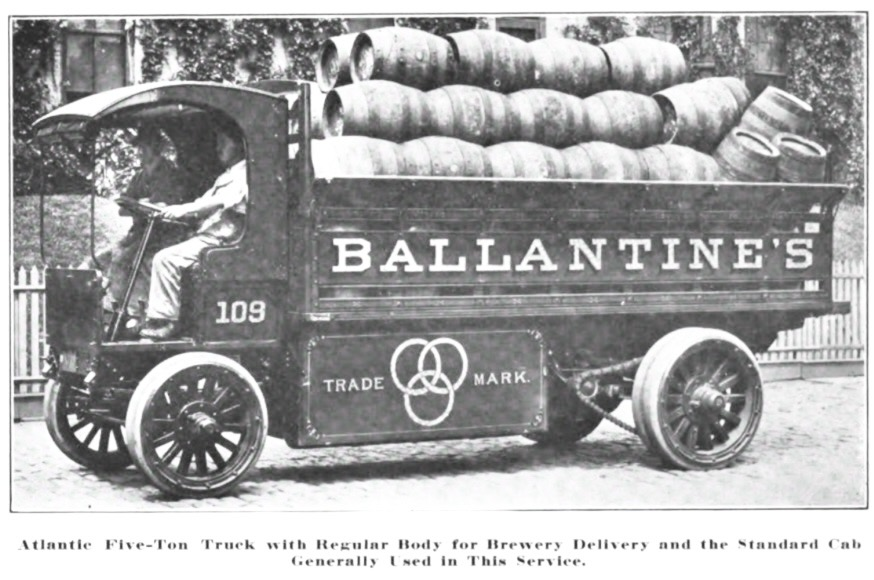
Atlantic 5 to truck in the service of the brewery (1913)

The company was founded in 1845 in Newark, New Jersey, by Peter Ballantine (1791–1883), who emigrated from Scotland. The company was originally incorporated as the Patterson & Ballantine Brewing Company.

=== Frelinghuysen era ===
Following the death of the last son of Peter Ballantine, the company was taken over by George Griswold Frelinghuysen, the company's vice-president, who was married to Ballantine's granddaughter.

Frelinghuysen was the son of Frederick Theodore Frelinghuysen and Matilda Elizabeth Griswold. He graduated from Rutgers College in 1870, received his Bachelor of Law from Columbia University Law School in 1872, and was admitted to the New Jersey and New York bars in 1872 and 1876 respectively.

The 18th Amendment took effect in 1920, beginning Prohibition. The company was forced to consolidate, and they manufactured Malt Syrup to stay in business. The Ballantine family continued to own the brewing company all throughout Prohibition. But by the time the 21st amendment was passed in 1933, the family was ready to sell the company.

=== Badenhausen era ===
An article announcing the return of Ballantine Ale just after Prohibition was lifted

In 1933, after Prohibition was lifted, the Ballantine company was acquired by two brothers, Carl and Otto Badenhausen. During the 1940s and 1950s, the brand expanded its market presence, utilizing various advertising strategies. Ballantine Beer was the first television sponsor of the New York Yankees. It was during this period that the brand was elevated to the number three beer in the U.S. It was also during this period that the company grew into one of the largest privately held corporations in the United States. Ballantine Beer enjoyed a high level of success into the early 1960s, however, by the mid-sixties, the brand began losing popularity. In 1965 Carl Badenhausen sold the company but remained at the helm until his retirement in 1969.

=== Decline ===
In the mid-1960s the company went into decline. It was losing market share to lighter lagers with less alcohol content. Despite advertising efforts to revive the company, the owners agreed to sell the brand, the company, and all their assets to the Falstaff Brewing Corporation in 1972.

The new owners closed the original brewery in Newark, started brewing elsewhere, and did not strictly adhere to Ballantine's recipes. Falstaff was successfully sued for violating the terms of the sales contract. The general consensus is that, under the stewardship of Falstaff, the beers remained faithful for a time to their original flavor profile. But Falstaff was doing poorly financially and was sold to Pabst in 1985. At an unknown point during these changes, the original recipes were lost.

Pabst continued to brew some of the Ballantine portfolios throughout the late 1980s and 1990s. They stopped brewing the IPA in 1996, and gradually all of the beers were discontinued with the exception of the flagship Ballantine XXX Ale. Throughout the 2000s and into the 2010s, Pabst continued to brew Ballantine's signature ale, but the recipe changed several times. The most notable changes are a markedly lower bitterness, lower alcohol content, fewer hops, and in general a much less assertive aromatic character. The use of distilled hop oil was discontinued until 2014 when Pabst Brewing Company relaunched a new version of Ballantine IPA.

=== Revival ===
In August 2014, a version of Ballantine IPA was revived by Pabst Brewing Company. Reports indicate that the original recipe has been long lost; however, some pains have been taken to attempt to recreate the palate and distinctive aroma of the original product. The recipe was reverse engineered by Pabst brewmaster Greg Deuhs. Because he had no recipe, he relied on analytical chemistry reports from as far back as the 1930s that tracked the ale's attributes (alcohol, bitterness, gravity level). He also researched what ingredients were likely used, historical accounts of the beer and beer lovers' remembrances.

In an interview in September 2014, brewmaster Greg Deuhs discussed the possibility of bringing back other beers in the Ballantine portfolio: "Just on the Ballantine side we're looking at the Brown Stout, they also made a Bock as well as the Burton Ale, which was highly regarded. I would like to bring out the Burton Ale as the true Barleywine Style Ale that it was.[...]Right now our hands are full with the Ballantine relaunch, but yes, we are starting to stoke the fire on what we can bring back."

On November 13, 2014, Pabst announced that it had completed its sale to Blue Ribbon Intermediate Holdings, LLC. Blue Ribbon is a partnership between American beer entrepreneur Eugene Kashper and TSG Consumer Partners, a San Francisco–based private equity firm. Prior reports suggested the price agreed upon was around $700 million.

Because Ballantine XXX Ale has in recent years been widely sold in 40-ounce bottles, it is often lumped together with Olde English 800 and other malt liquors in the public mind. This is in direct contradiction with Pabst's vision for the brand today. Pabst revived Ballantine India Pale Ale to enter the craft beer market. It is unclear at this time if Pabst will take steps to align Ballantine XXX Ale more with the brand of the relaunched Ballantine IPA.

In July 2015, during an interview with John Holl, Kashper hinted at the possibility of building a small brewery in Newark, NJ, where the company was founded.

On November 16, 2015, Pabst announced that it would be reviving Ballantine Burton Ale for the 2015 holiday season. This new version was reverse engineered by Pabst brewmaster Greg Deuhs as was Ballantine IPA from 2014. This barleywine style ale had 11.3% ABV, 75 IBUs, and a starting gravity of 26.5 Plato. It was no longer aged 10–20 years in oak barrels, but to help recreate the flavor of the original, Pabst aged this reboot for several months in barrels lined with American oak. The major difference was that this rendition would be sold to the general public, while the original was only given as gifts to high ranking executives at the company, friends of the company, and VIPs such as President Harry S. Truman. Pabst said it was a seasonal brew and made no comment as to any further plans with Ballantine Burton Ale after the 2015 holiday season.

There is no confirmed evidence that Ballantine Burton Ale has been produced or distributed after 2015, and the brand is not currently listed among Pabst Brewing Company's active offerings.

== Logo ==
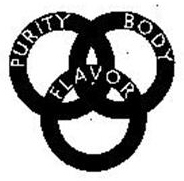
One of the first logos ever created for Ballantine

The Ballantine logo is three interlocking rings, a design known as the Borromean rings. According to legend, Peter Ballantine was inspired to use the symbol when he noticed the overlapping condensation rings left by beer glasses on a table; however, this logo was not created until 1879. In some advertising campaigns in the mid-1900s, Peter Ballantine was referred to as "Three-Ring Pete"; however, it is unknown if this was his nickname when he was alive. The rings represent "Purity, Body, and Flavor". New York Yankees announcer Mel Allen called it "the Three-Ring Sign".

== Products ==
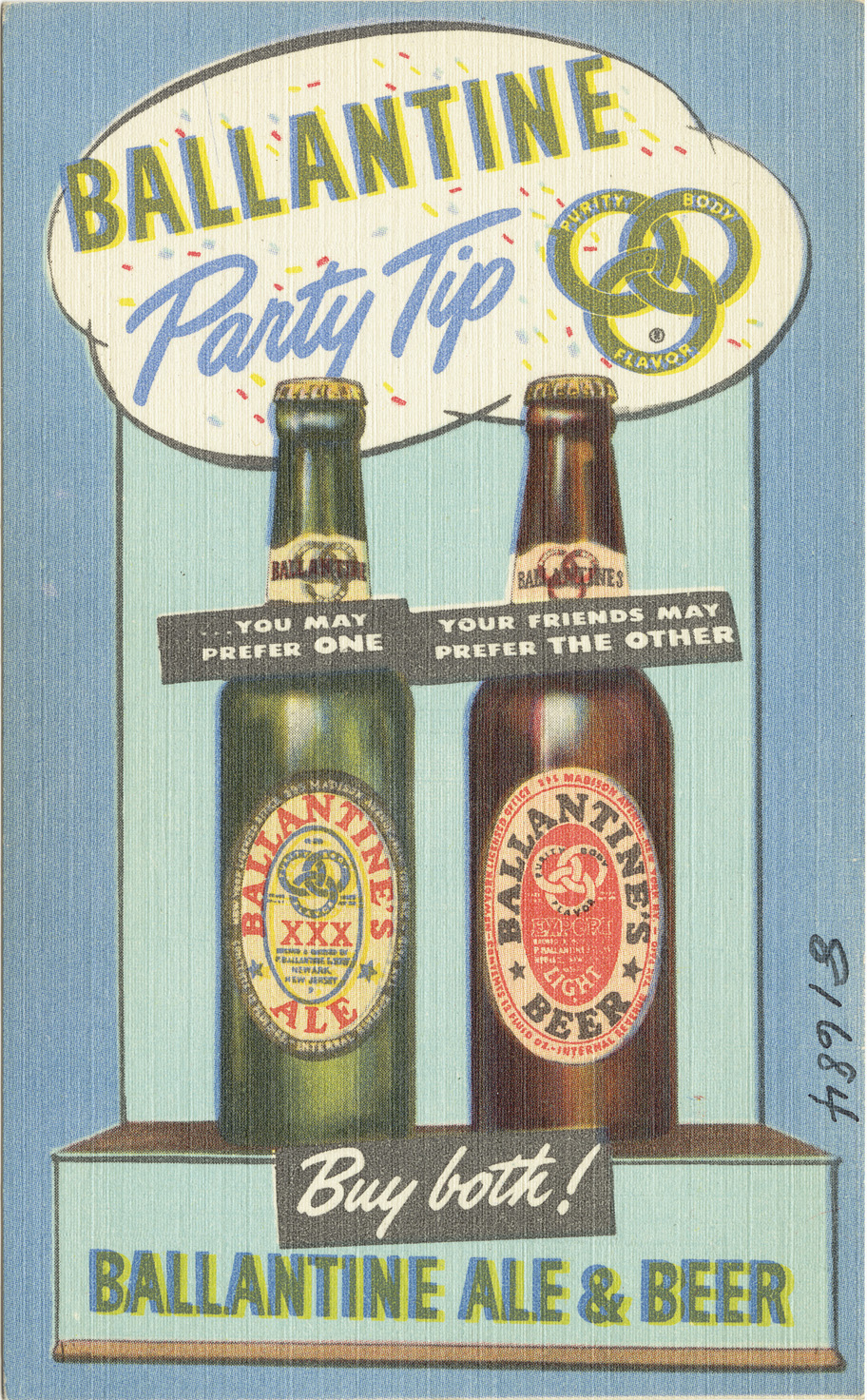
Promotion for the Ale and Beer

Throughout the years, Ballantine offered a wide range of different products, some of these include:

- The XXX Ale, their flagship product, which is top fermented.
- A light lager
- A dark lager
- An India Pale Ale, which was an intensely bitter and aromatic brew that was aged for a year in wood prior to bottling.
- A Brown Stout, also aged for a year in wood prior to bottling.
- A Porter, with the XXX designation.
- A Bock beer
- A Burton ale, never commercially sold, it was brewed to be given as a gift to Ballantine distributors, executives, and VIPs. It was a strong brew in the barleywine style, aged from 10 to 20 years in wood prior to bottling. Surviving unopened bottles are still bought, sold, and traded to this day among collectors, more than 60 years after being brewed. Because of the long aging and generous hopping as well as an ABV content comparable to barleywines, the beer had remarkable keeping qualities. Still, it could be argued that since the beer was already long aged prior to bottling, it was probably already at its peak when finally bottled. Reports of modern-day tastings indicate that properly handled vintage bottles of this unique beer can still yield a complex (though somewhat faded) taste experience.

== In popular culture ==
=== In literature ===
- Writer/journalist Hunter S. Thompson mentions drinking Ballantine Ale twice in his novel Fear and Loathing in Las Vegas. At the beginning of Chapter 12, Thompson writes "Into the Ballantine Ale now, zombie drunk and nervous." Later in Chapter 12, Thompson writes "'Ballantine Ale,' I said ... a very mystic long shot, unknown between Newark and San Francisco. He served it up, ice-cold. I relaxed. Suddenly everything was going right; I was finally getting the breaks." Thompson's book was based on a trip he took with his attorney in March and April 1971, approximately one year before Ballantine sold to Falstaff.
- The iconic American writer Ernest Hemingway endorsed Ballantine Ale in a print advertisement. This ad was part of a larger campaign featuring authors and novelists, asking them "How would you put a glass of Ballantine Ale into words?" Hemingway was the most prominent writer to participate followed by John Steinbeck. Other writers who were in the campaign include:
  - James A. Michener, author of over 40 books, who is best known for Tales of the South Pacific for which he won the Pulitzer Prize for Fiction in 1948.
  - C.S. Forester, who is best known for writing the Horatio Hornblower series, which was later turned into a TV series.
  - Erle Stanley Gardner, who is best known for his Perry Mason detective novels, which were also turned into a TV series.
  - Anita Loos, who wrote Gentlemen Prefer Blondes, which was adapted into a popular movie starring Marilyn Monroe.

Lesser known writers who participated include: J.B. Priestley, A.J. Cronin, Paul Gallico, James Hilton, and Clarence Budington Kelland.

- Ballantine's Beer is referred to as "expensive imported beer" in Sara Sheridan's Brighton Belle, a mystery set on the South Coast in England in the 1950s.
- Alan D. Eames, beer writer and historian, who was considered the "Indiana Jones of beer," wrote about Ballantine IPA. "Ballantine India Pale Ale. Jesus, this beer is a holy sacrament! Dangerous, high-test, 44 magnum ale, its bitter, woody suds, reeking of spruce sap, overwhelm the nose and palate — God, this is fabulous ale." Later in the passage he pleads "The American beer industry — take the best ale in America and use all our advertising and packaging skill to render it such that no one in their right mind would ever venture to try it and then, 'let's drop it 'cause this brand just ain't selling.'" He concludes with "Oh well — Ballantine India Pale Ale, last bright jewel in the tarnished crown of American brewing, you haunt me still. Neither one of us fit into the scheme of things these days. May God preserve and protect us both." (1986)

=== In art ===
- Artist Jasper Johns created a famous sculpture of two Ballantine XXX Ale cans titled Painted Bronze (1960).
- Pop artist Tom Wesselmann included two Ballantine XXX Ale cans in Still Life #28 (1964).

=== In the military ===
- Bottles of Ballantine Beer, the lager, are featured prominently in a picture of a group of sailors celebrating VJ Day at the Naval Air Station(NAS) Beaufort, South Carolina.
- In World War II, Ballantine made a beer can that was painted drab olive, so it would not reflect light and give away the position of the American soldiers.

=== In politics ===
- In 1983, President Ronald Reagan famously held up a pint of Ballantine Ale draft at a local bar in Boston.
- President Harry S. Truman was the recipient of a bottle of the prestigious and highly regarded Burton Ale, which was never sold to the general public, only given as gifts to important people.

=== In music ===
- According to several sources, Frank Sinatra was a fan of Ballantine Ale and even mentioned it on stage one time.
- The Beastie Boys mention Ballantine in their song "High Plains Drifter". In particular, they refer to the rebus puzzles that began being printed on the underside of the bottle caps during the Falstaff era. "I feel like Steve McQueen a former movie star, look in my rearview mirror seen a police car. Ballantine quarts with the puzzle on the cap, I couldn't help but notice I was caught in a speed trap."
- Rapper GZA/The Genius of hip-hop supergroup Wu-Tang Clan mentions Ballantine Ale numerous times on many different groups and solo albums, as have other clan members. GZA/The Genius most notably mentions the classic ale on the Enter the Wu-Tang album track "Clan In da Front".
- The Notorious B.I.G. mentions Ballantine in "Long Kiss Goodnight" of his sophomore album Life After Death. "Distribute to, kids who, take heart like Valentine, Drink Ballantine, all the time."
- Jay-Z mentions Ballantine Ale in "The Joy," a collaborative effort with Kanye West and Curtis Mayfield. "Taking sips of pop, six-pack of Miller nips, Pink Champale, Ballantine Ale." Today, Champale and Ballantine Ale are both owned by Pabst.
- Jay-Z also mentions Ballantine Ale in his 2010 interview with Charlie Rose. Rose and Jay-Z talked about how the rapper used to sell crack cocaine. Rose asked "You never used it?" Jay-Z responded "No. Crack cocaine? No. [laughter] Come on, man. [more laughter] That's hardcore, man. A little weed. Ballantine Ale. Guinness Stout."
- In the album art for Led Zeppelin's fourth album, each band member chose and/or designed four individual personal symbols to represent them. It is rumored that drummer John Bonham chose an inverted version of Ballantine's Borromean ring logo for this purpose.
- The Good Rats song "City Liners" from their 1979 "Birth Comes To Us All" includes Ballantine in its lyrics "And sneak a couple of his daddy's Ballantine".
- The Billy Joel song "No Man's Land" (album River of Dreams) includes the line, "bankers with their Volvos and their Ballantine's".
- Rick Moranis sings about Ballantine's in "It's the Champagne Talkin'" on his Album Agoraphobic Cowboy. "Valentine's, It was Ballantine's, Easter, It was ouzo, Beaujolais, On Bastille Day, Labor Day, Absolut-no!"

=== In radio ===
- Ballantine Ale sponsored Three Ring Time, a comedy-variety show with Milton Berle, in the early 1940s.

=== In television ===
- Ballantine Beer was the preferred beer of Martin Crane on the television show Frasier. He drinks the lager in many episodes throughout the series, mostly from the can. In season 7, episode 24, he drinks a draft at the bar during Daphne's rehearsal dinner - lamenting his loss of both Daphne and his beloved Ballantine, brewing of which he noted was to be stopped. In season 7, episode 15, a Valentine's Day episode, he jokingly says to his beer can "Will you be my Ballantine?"
- Mel Brooks adapted the 2000 Year Old Man character to create the 2500-Year-Old Brewmaster for Ballantine Beer in the 1960s. Interviewed by Dick Cavett in a series of ads, the Brewmaster (in a German accent, as opposed to the 2000 Year Old Man's Jewish voice) said he was inside the original Trojan horse and "could've used a six-pack of fresh air."
- The syndicated western/detective television show Shotgun Slade had Ballantine Beer as its title sponsor.
- Ballantine XXX Ale is featured prominently in The Marvelous Mrs. Maisel season 2 episode 7.

== Sponsorships ==
- The brewery had a long sponsorship arrangement with the New York Yankees on television and radio, spanning the 1940s to 1966 (when the partnership was dropped).
- New York Yankees broadcasts featured commercials with the jingle "Baseball and Ballantine/ Baseball and Ballantine/ What a combination/ All across the nation/ Ballantine, Ballantine beer."
- Ballantine also sponsored the Philadelphia Phillies on radio and TV for many years in the 1950s and 1960s. The scoreboard in right-center field at Philadelphia's Connie Mack Stadium (previously known as Shibe Park) sported a 60-foot-long (18 m) Ballantine Beer sign between 1956 and 1970.
- In 1963 and 1964, Ballantine sponsored a drum and bugle corps based in Newark, New Jersey named the "Ballantine Brewers".
- P. Ballantine and Sons Brewing Company owned the Boston Celtics for a brief period of time in the late 1960s.
- Former baseball player Mickey McDermott was signed to the Boston Red Sox for $5,000 and two truck loads of Ballantine Beer.

=== Since the relaunch ===
- Ballantine IPA was the Official Beer of the 2015 Pork Roll Festival in Trenton, New Jersey.

== Presidents ==
- Peter Ballantine (1791–1883) from 1840 through 1883
- Robert Francis Ballantine (1836–1905) possibly from 1883 through 1905
- George Griswold Frelinghuysen (1851–1936) from 1905 through ?
- Charles Bradley from ? to 1929
- Carl Badenhausen (1894–1981) from 1933 to May 21, 1964
- John E. Farrell from May 21, 1964 to January 9, 1967
- Richard Griebel from January 9, 1967 to February 17, 1969
- Jack Waldron from February 17, 1969 to June 24, 1969
- Stephen D. Haymes from June 24, 1969 through ?

== See also ==
- List of defunct breweries in the United States

Preceded by National Equities	Boston Celtics principal owner 1968–1969	Succeeded by Trans-National Communications
Preceded by Trans-National Communications	Boston Celtics principal owner 1971–1972	Succeeded by Irv Levin
