= List of botanical gardens and arboretums in New Jersey =

This list of botanical gardens and arboretums in New Jersey is intended to include all significant botanical gardens and arboretums in the U.S. state of New Jersey

Name	Image	Affiliation	City	Coordinates
Bamboo Brook Outdoor Education Center		Morris County Park Commission	Chester Township	40°43′53″N 74°42′26″W
Lewis W. Barton Arboretum			Medford	39°54′18.72″N 74°48′57.96″W
Leonard J. Buck Garden			Far Hills	40°40′22.91″N 74°37′20.65″W
Sister Mary Grace Burns Arboretum		Georgian Court University	Lakewood	40°5′42.72″N 74°13′39.72″W
Colonial Park Arboretum and Gardens			East Millstone	40°30′32.4″N 74°34′26.76″W
Duke Gardens			Somerville	40°33′2.23″N 74°37′7.36″W
Frelinghuysen Arboretum			Morristown	40°48′10.8″N 74°27′10.8″W
Cora Hartshorn Arboretum and Bird Sanctuary			Short Hills	40°43′30″N 74°19′41″W
Herrontown Woods Arboretum			Princeton	40°22′55.06″N 74°38′49.02″W
Morven Museum & Garden			Princeton	40°20′50.97″N 74°40′1.03″W
Holmdel Arboretum			Holmdel	40°19′50.16″N 74°8′27.6″W
Hunterdon County Arboretum			Lebanon	40°34′42.24″N 74°51′34.2″W
Leaming's Run Gardens			Swainton	39°8′35.52″N 74°46′3″W
Pohatcong Native Arboretum			Washington	40°46′33″N 74°59′32″W
Presby Memorial Iris Gardens			Montclair	40°51′5″N 74°12′23″W
Reeves-Reed Arboretum			Summit	40°43′36″N 74°20′53″W
Rutgers Gardens		Rutgers University	New Brunswick	40°28′27.48″N 74°25′21.36″W
Sayen Park Botanical Garden			Hamilton Township	40°14′9.24″N 74°39′29.88″W
Skylands		Ringwood State Park	Ringwood	41°7′30″N 74°14′14″W
Stony Brook Millstone Watershed Arboretum			Pennington	40°21′9″N 74°46′21.72″W
Howard Van Vleck Arboretum			Montclair	40°49′6.96″N 74°13′29.64″W
Wagner Farm Arboretum			Warren	40°39′1.8″N 74°30′20.88″W
Willowwood Arboretum		Morris County Park Commission	Chester Township	40°43′33.6″N 74°41′56.76″W
Florence and Robert Zuck Arboretum		Drew University	Madison	40°45′39″N 74°25′37″W
Deep Cut Gardens		Monmouth County Park System	Middletown	40°23′23.4024″N 74°7′48″W

== See also ==
- List of botanical gardens and arboretums in the United States
