= Morris County Park Commission =

Board of commissioners in New Jersey, US

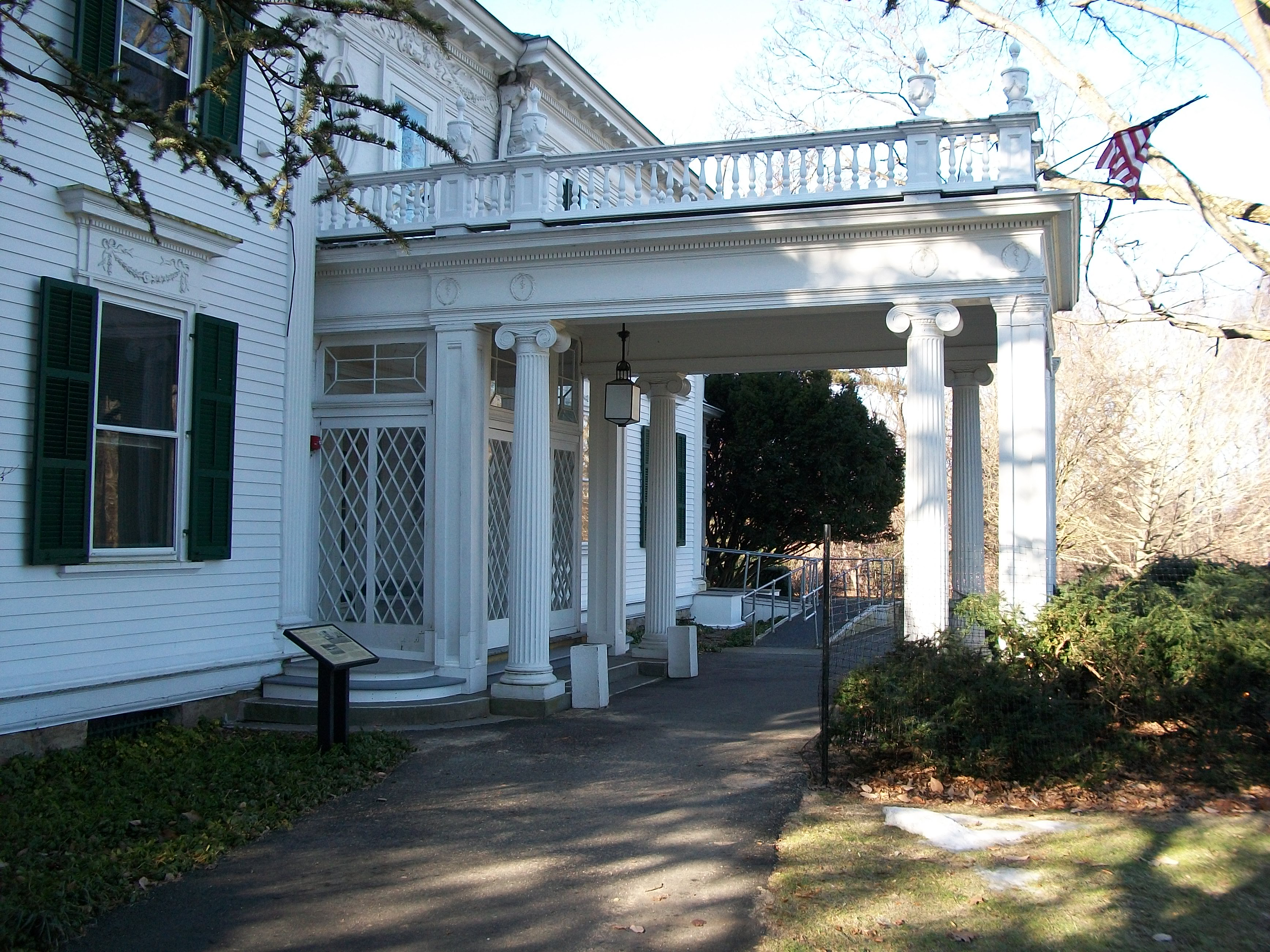
- Headquarters of the Morris County Park Commission in the Frelinghuysen Arboretum
- Abbreviation: MCPC
- Formation: 1956
- Headquarters: 300 Mendham Road; Morris Township, New Jersey 07960
- Website: www.morrisparks.net

The Morris County Park Commission (MCPC) is a board of commissioners that manages parks, facilities, and historic sites in Morris County, in the U.S. state of New Jersey.

It is the largest county park system in New Jersey. Russel Myers was its first Secretary-Director and Director, serving the system from 1955 until 1983.

The MCPC provides the public with more than 20,000 acres (8,100 ha) for recreational, leisure, and educational use. As of May 2022, it operates 38 facilities including outdoor parks, trails, a marina, an ice skating arena, a horse stable, a historical farm and an operating mill.

== History ==
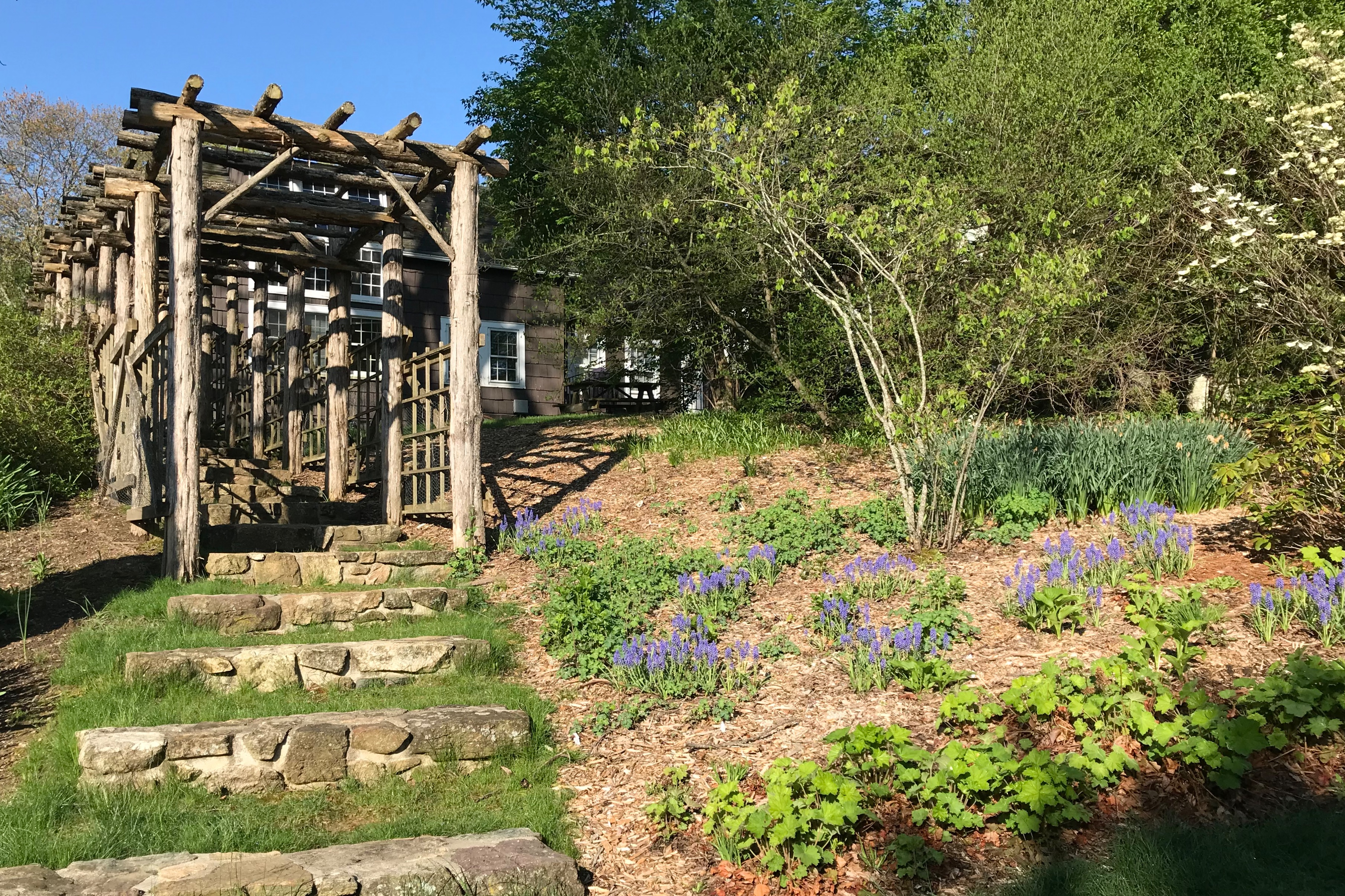
Arbor and flower garden at the Bamboo Brook Outdoor Education Center, managed by the Morris County Park Commission

Morris County likely followed in the footsteps of other local park commissions. For example, New York City's Central Park Commission was founded in 1856; the Hudson County Park Commission was created in 1892; and the Essex County Park Commission was created in 1895.

Circa 1955, the Morris County Planning board recommended the creation of a Park Commission to the Morris County Board of Chosen Freeholders. The goal of the commission was to provide attractive recreation areas, as well as aid traffic problems and protect limited water resources. Passage of a voter referendum in 1956 formally established a Morris County Park Commission, and this was reported upon in American City. Its first leader was Secretary-Director Russel W. Myers, a landscape architect. That year, the Garden Club of America announced an alliance with the Morris County Park Commission's mission of "acquiring land, preserving natural areas, [and] protecting watersheds and streams from pollution."

In March 1958, the 350-acre (140 ha) Lewis Morris County Park in Morristown was the first park to be dedicated by the MCPC. As of 2021, it has expanded to 2,196 acres (889 ha) with 22.1 miles (35.6 km) of trails. The park alone includes "hiking, off-road biking, and equestrian trails[,] picnic areas[,] athletic fields, a dog park, group camping areas[,] sledding, snowshoeing, and cross-country skiing" and, in the summer, the Sunrise Lake Beach Club, a water obstacle course, a flume, paddleboat riding, and fishing. The park was named for Lewis Morris, the first Governor of New Jersey (according to some sources) while it was part of Britain's Thirteen Colonies.

Since 1962, the Morris County Park Commission developed buffer areas and programs to protect the Great Swamp from urban development. The following, the Morris County Park Commission constructed a nature education center on part of the 556 acres (225 ha) of the Loantaka Brook Reservation.

Circa 1973, Myers, a landscape architect and MCPC's Secretary-Director, had weekly tea for years with Morristown farmer Caroline Foster. In 1973, they arranged for Foster to bequeath her farm estate to the MCPC. In 1974, farmer Caroline Foster designated in her will that Fosterfields would be bequeathed to the MCPC for use as an educational farm and historic site. Upon Foster's death in 1979, the Park Commission received the farm.

In 1979, Myers announced that the commission was opposed to the proposed alignment of Interstate 287. This was due to the environmental detriment to the Sunset Valley Golf Course as well as noise and drainage issues created by the proposed road.

In 1983, the Russell M. Myers Scholarship was established, named for the first Secretary-Director and later Director of the MCPC.

In July 2020, WKXW and InsiderNJ reported that Morris County parks saw increased use after Governor Phil Murphy reopened parks during the COVID-19 pandemic.

In 2019, the Morris County Park Commission announced their intention to create a recreational trail looping around the 700-acre (280 ha) Boonton Reservoir, a source of clean drinking water for over 300,000 people. Circa 2021, the Morris County Park Commission received the permit. The MCPC expects to break ground in the trail's creation in 2022.

In 2021, the MCPC unanimously voted to authorize improvements to Lewis Morris County Park in Harding Township. The area receiving improvements is dedicated to Russel Myers, titled the Russ Myers Recreation Area. The "halfmile ADA Accessible loop trail encircling the area...will have an 8’ wide paved surface, a picnic shelter with electricity to accommodate 200 people, landscaping for screening and beautification, and additional parking to accommodate increased capacity, including ADA parking." The estimated cost is $904,000.

== List of parks ==
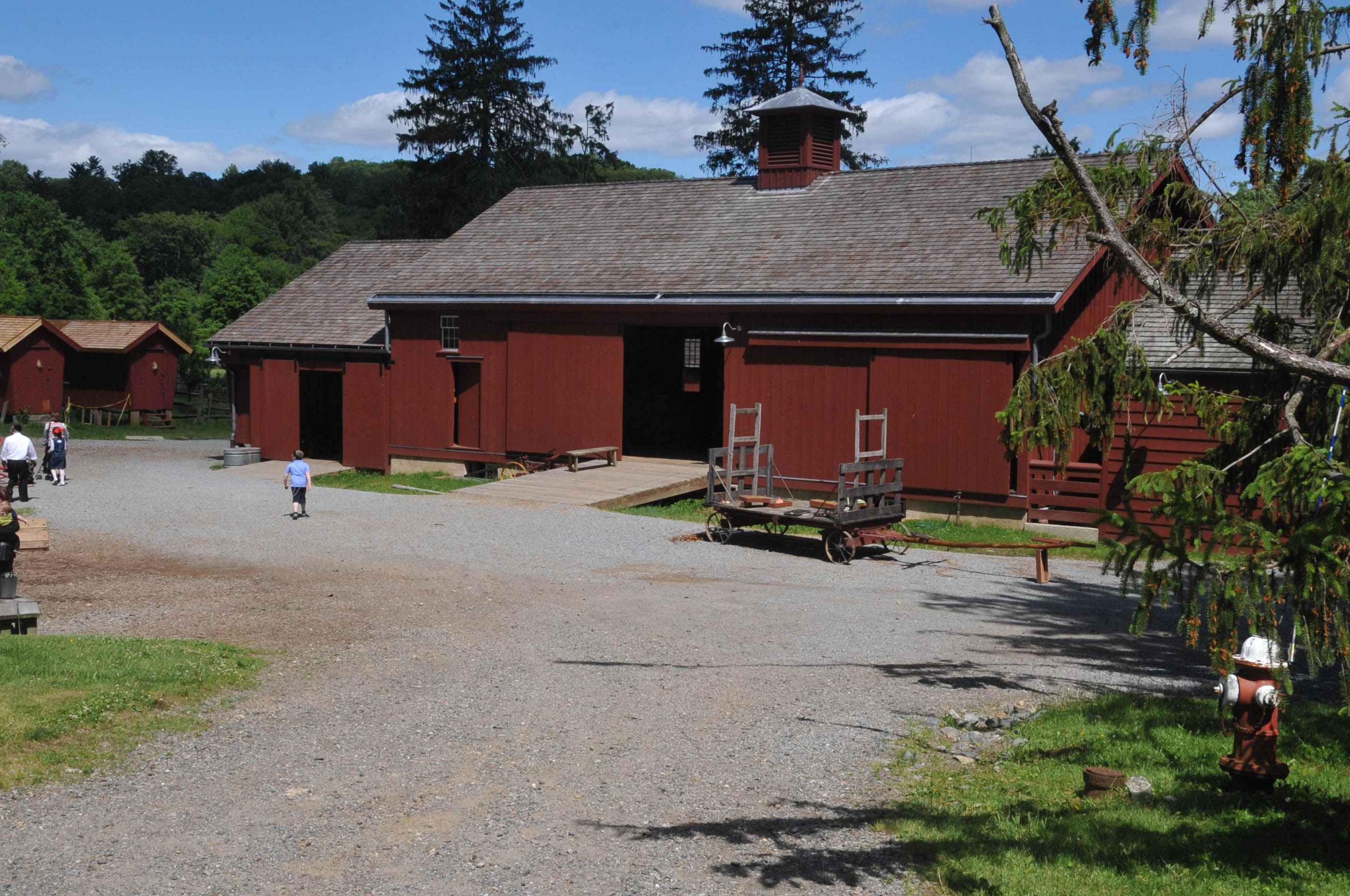
Fosterfields Living Historical Farm, a historic site and open-air museum managed by the Morris County Park Commission

The below parks and historic sites are overseen by the Morris County Park Commission.

Name	Municipality
Bamboo Brook Outdoor Education Center	Chester Township
Central Park of Morris County	Parsippany-Troy Hills
Columbia Trail	Long Valley
Cooper Gristmill	Chester Township
Craigmeur Recreation Complex	Rockaway Township
Cultural Center	Morristown
Elizabeth D. Kay Environmental Center	Chester Township
Fosterfields Living Historical Farm	Morris Township
Frelinghuysen Arboretum	Morris Township
Great Swamp Outdoor Education Center	Chatham Township
Hedden County Park	Randolph
Historic Speedwell	Morristown
James Andrews Memorial County Park	Randolph
Jonathan's Woods	Denville Township
Lee's County Park Marina	Mount Arlington
Lewis Morris County Park	Morris Township
Loantaka Brook Reservation	Morris Township
Mahlon Dickerson Reservation	Jefferson
William G. Mennen Sports Arena	Morris Township
Minnisink Reservation	Jefferson Township
Mount Hope Historical County Park	Wharton
Mount Paul Memorial County Park	Chester/Mendham Townships
Old Troy County Park	Parsippany-Troy Hills
Passaic River County Park	Chatham Township
Pyramid Mountain Natural Historic Area	Montville
Schooley's Mountain County Park	Washington Township
Seaton Hackney Stables	Morris Township
Silas Condict County Park	Kinnelon
Tourne County Park	Denville
Traction Line Recreation Trail	Morristown
Waughaw Mountain	Kinnelon
West Morris Greenway/Hugh Force Park	Wharton
Willowwood Arboretum	Chester Township

=== Golf courses ===
Morris County is home to four golf courses that are open to the public and overseen by the MCPC, with each offering golf lessons and practice facilities.

List of MCPC operated golf courses
Golf Course	Municipality	Acreage	Opening year
Berkshire Valley Golf Course	Oak Ridge	497	2004
Flanders Valley Golf Course	Flanders	413	1964 (Note: Flanders Valley Golf Course 1 (White-to-Blue))/1974 (Note: Flanders Valley Golf Course 2 (Red-to-Gold))
Pinch Brook Golf Course	Florham Park	102	1985
Sunset Valley Golf Course	Pompton Plains	217	1974
