= Bamboo Brook Outdoor Education Center =

Botanical garden and public park in Chester Township, New Jersey

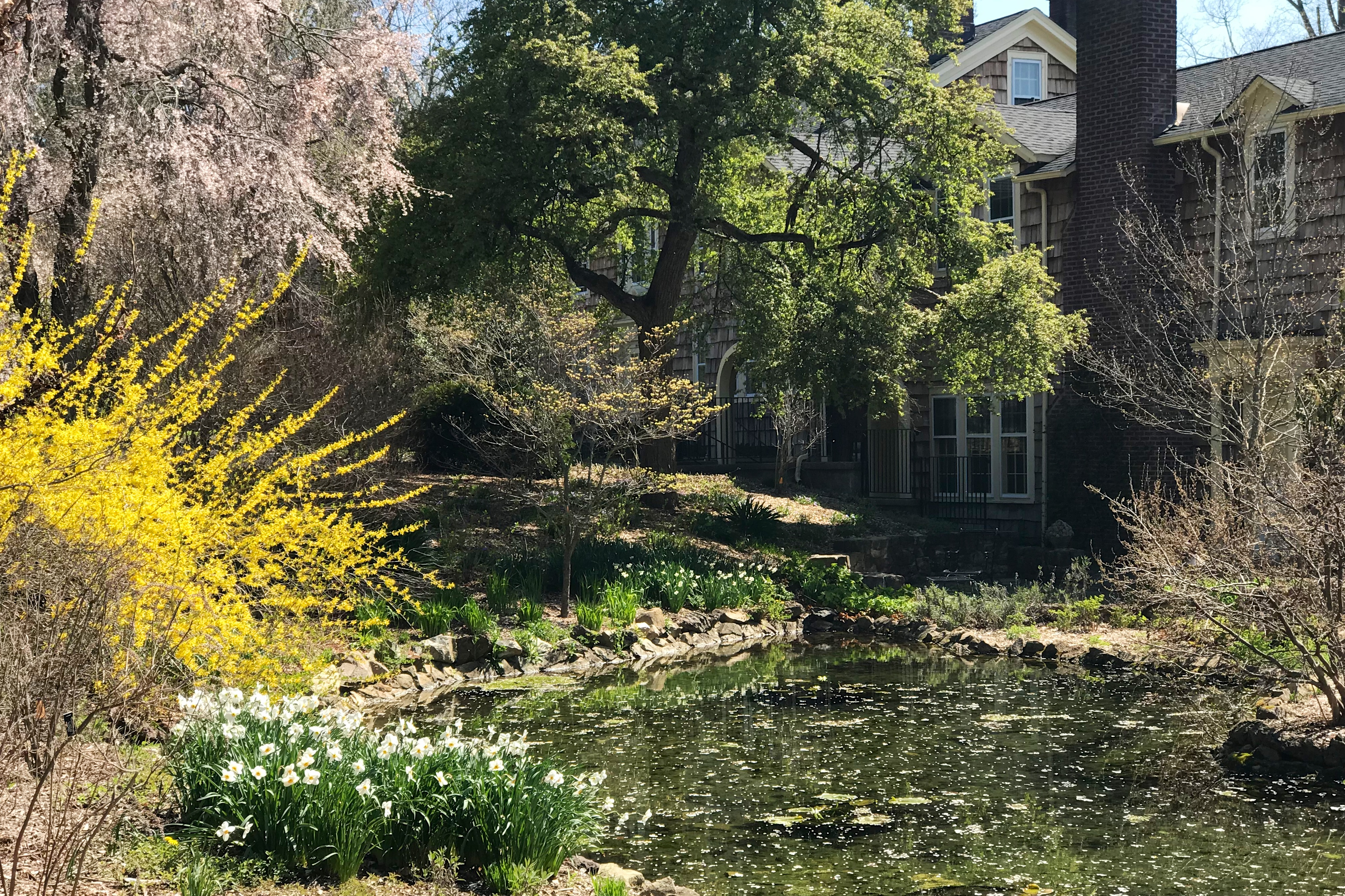
- Daffodils, bushes and trees in bloom by the Upper Water pool

- Location within Morris County, New Jersey Location within New Jersey Location within the United States
- Location: 170 Longview Road; Chester Township, New Jersey
- Coordinates: 40°43′53″N 74°42′26″W
- Operator: Morris County Park Commission
- Merchiston Farm
- U.S. National Register of Historic Places
- New Jersey Register of Historic Places
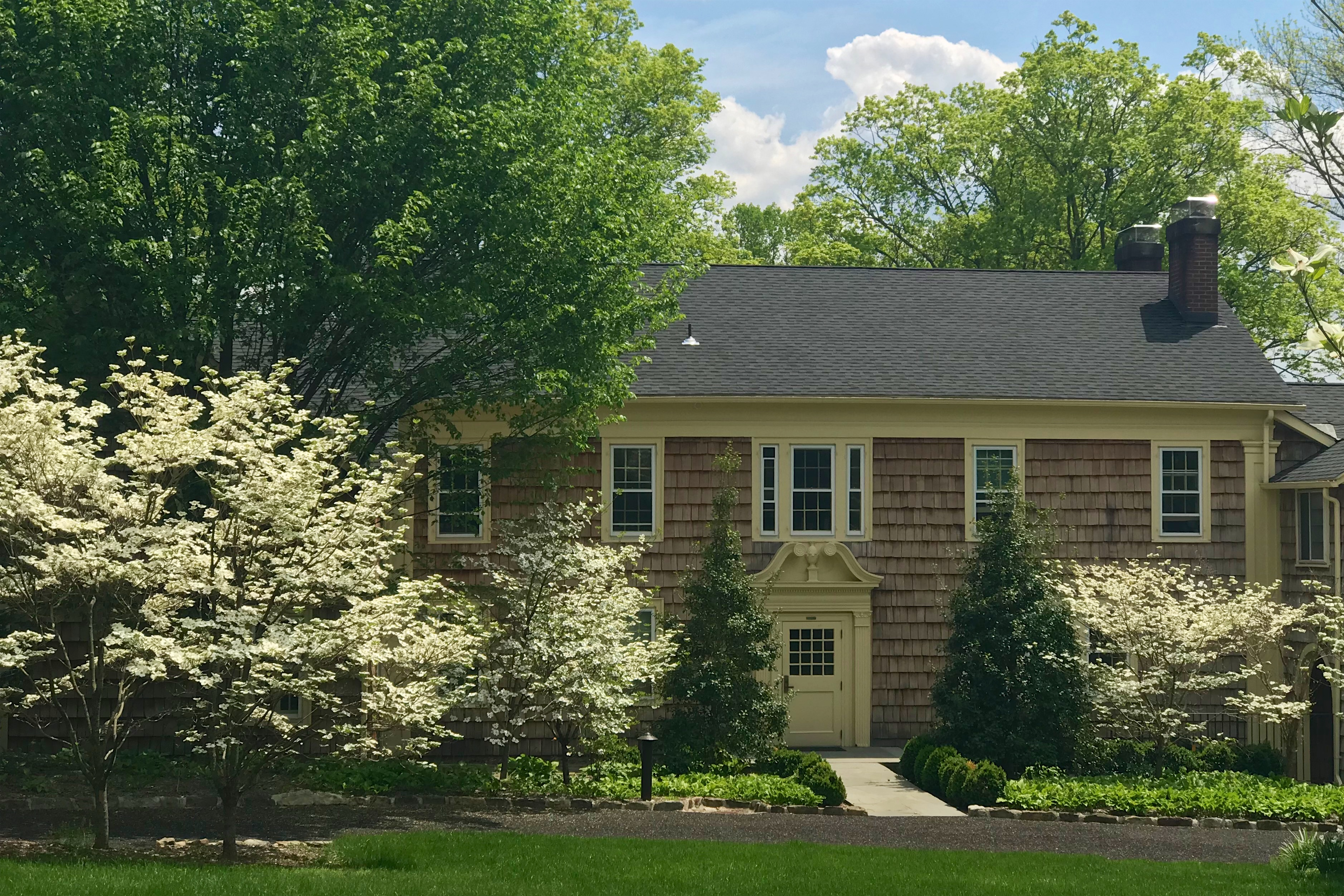
- Dogwoods in bloom in front of the Hutcheson House, home to Martha Brookes Hutcheson
- Area: 101 acres (41 ha)
- Built: 1912
- Architect: Martha Brookes Hutcheson; William Lawrence Bottomley
- Architectural style: Colonial Revival
- NRHP reference No.: 89001946
- NJRHP No.: 2104

Significant dates
- Added to NRHP: November 13, 1989
- Designated NJRHP: September 5, 1989

Bamboo Brook Outdoor Education Center is a botanical garden and public park located at 170 Longview Road in Chester Township of Morris County, New Jersey. The house and garden, listed using its historic name, Merchiston Farm, was added to the National Register of Historic Places on November 13, 1989 for its significance as the home of the American landscape architect Martha Brookes Hutcheson and her landscaping of the property. The site includes six contributing buildings and six contributing structures.

== History and description ==
In the late 18th century, the property was owned by Frederick Hunnel. The original farmhouse was a simple two-story house. It was expanded in 1848. The property was sold to William and Martha Brookes Hutcheson in 1912. Mrs. Hutcheson designed an expansion of the house featuring Colonial Revival style. It was later expanded by the architect William Lawrence Bottomley in 1927. Hutcheson lived here until her death in 1959. The property became part of the Morris County Park Commission in 1972.

== Gallery ==
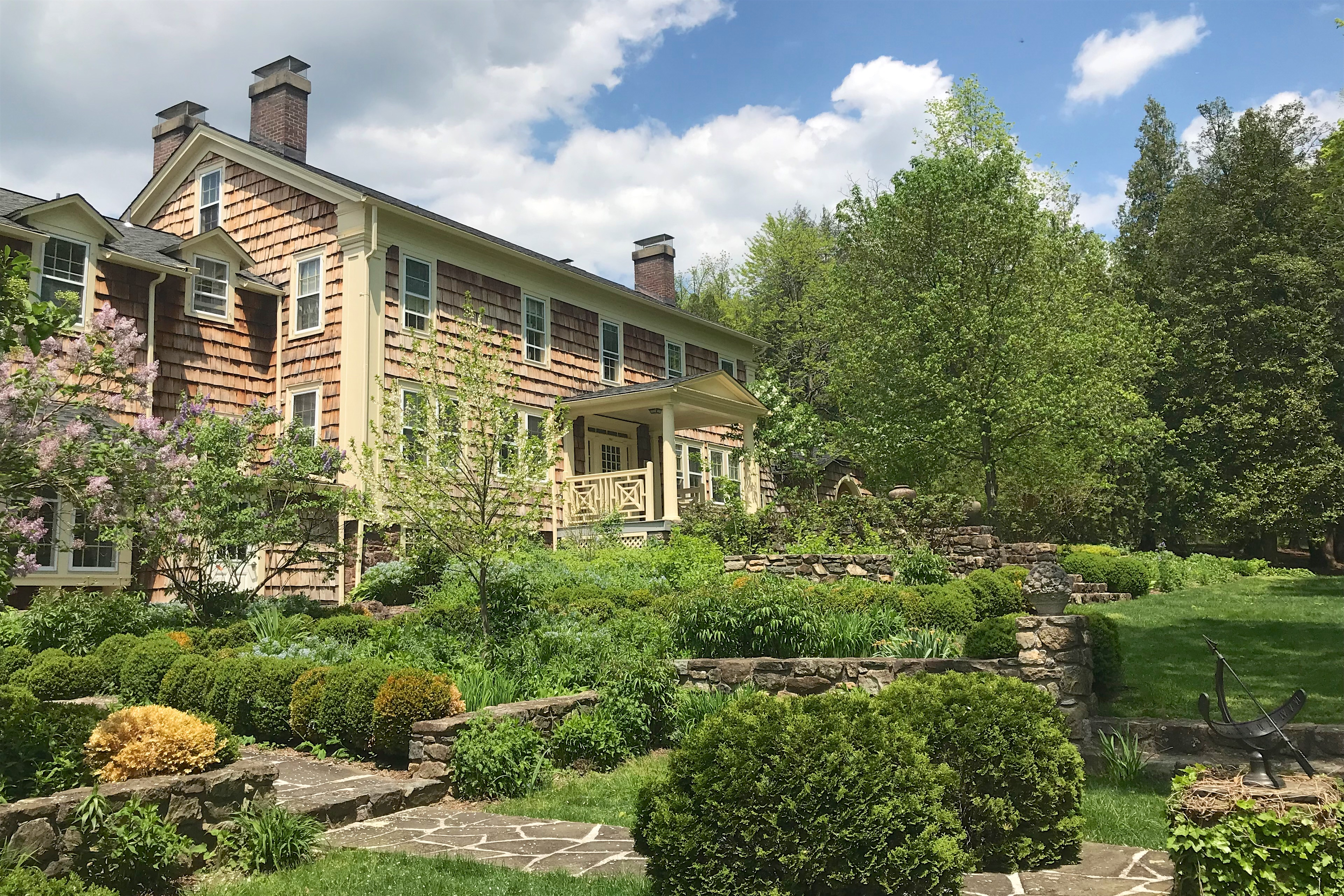
Hutcheson House and garden, sundial

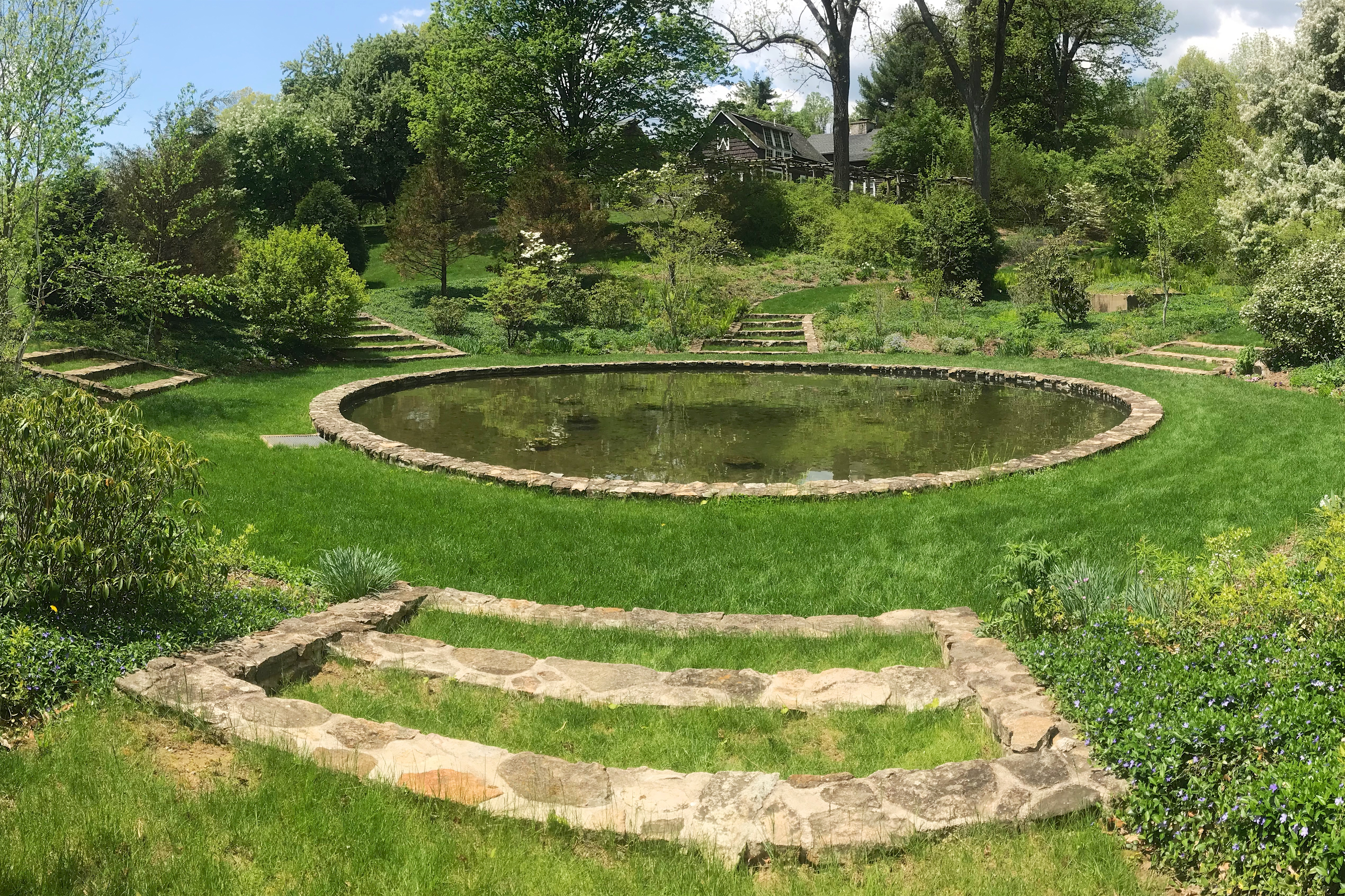
Reflecting Pool

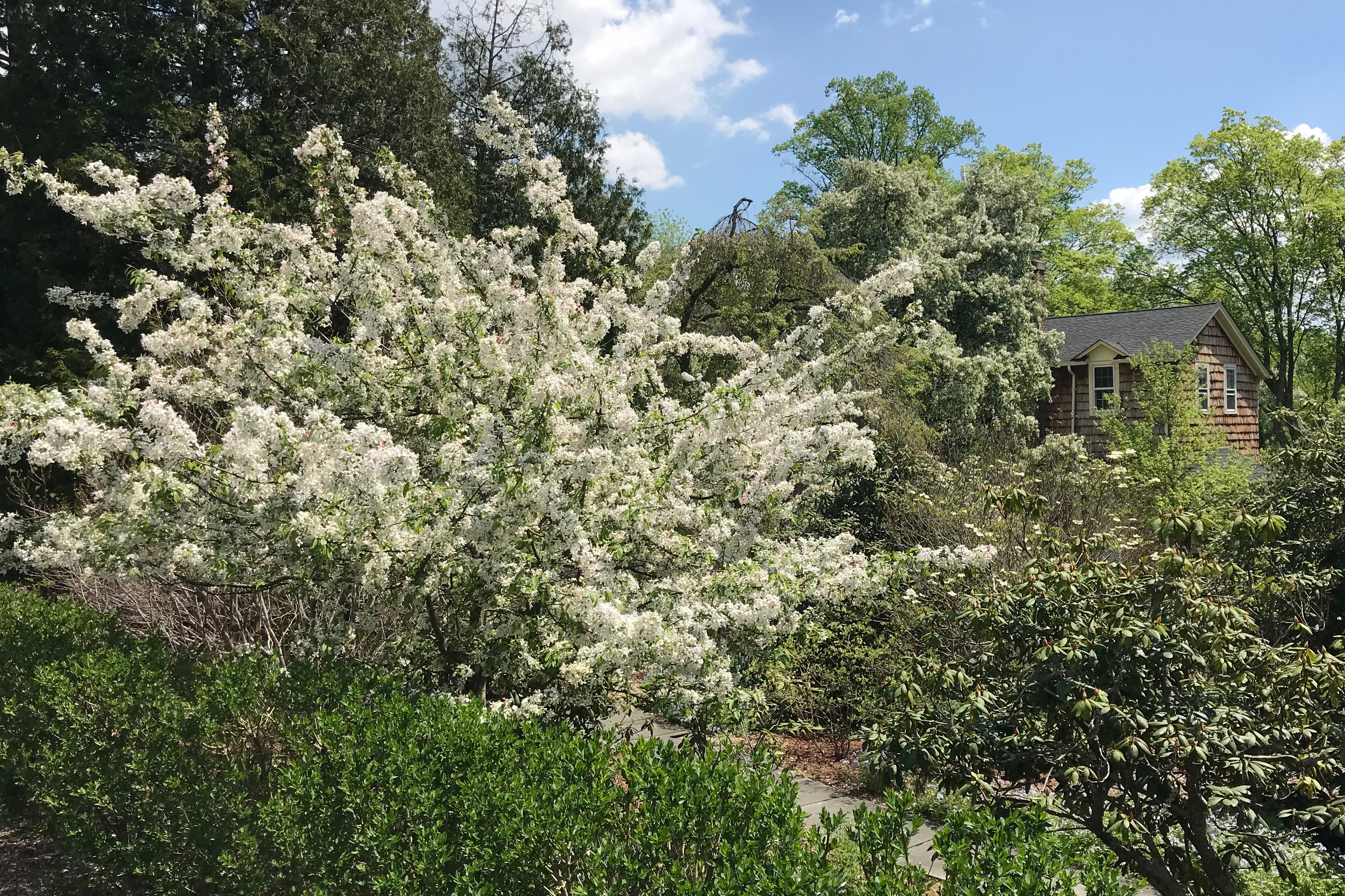
Flowering trees

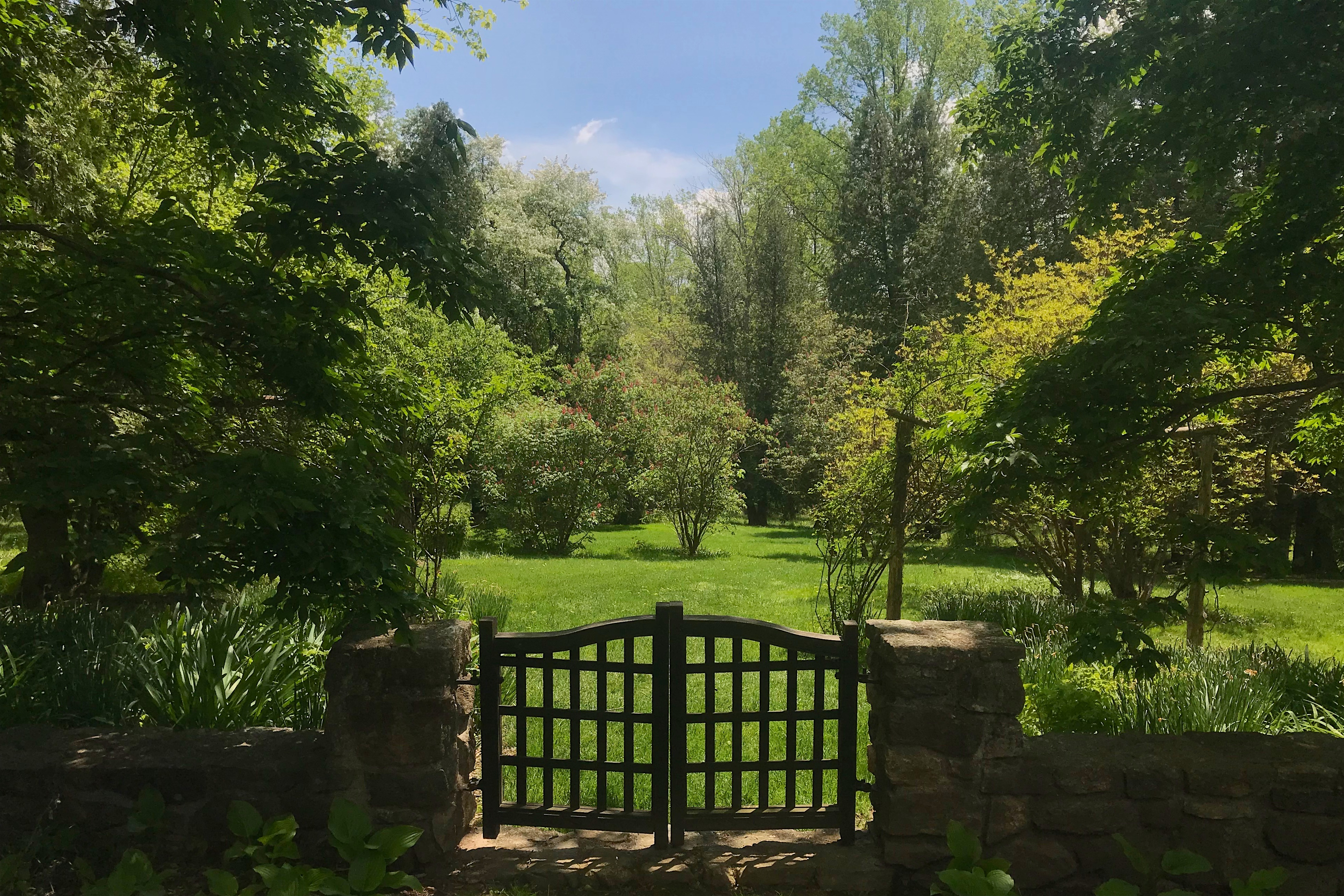
Vista from the Hutcheson House

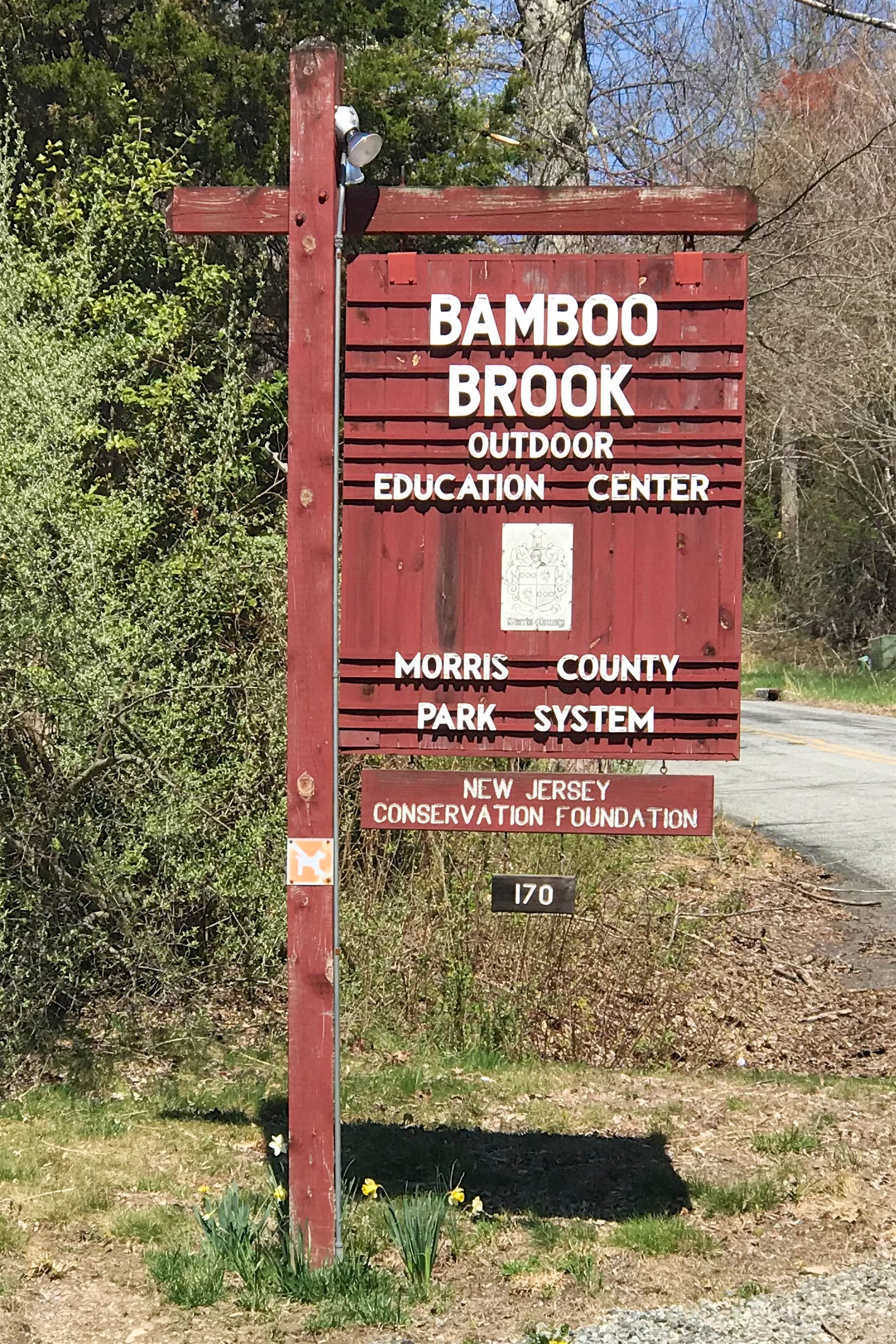
Entrance sign

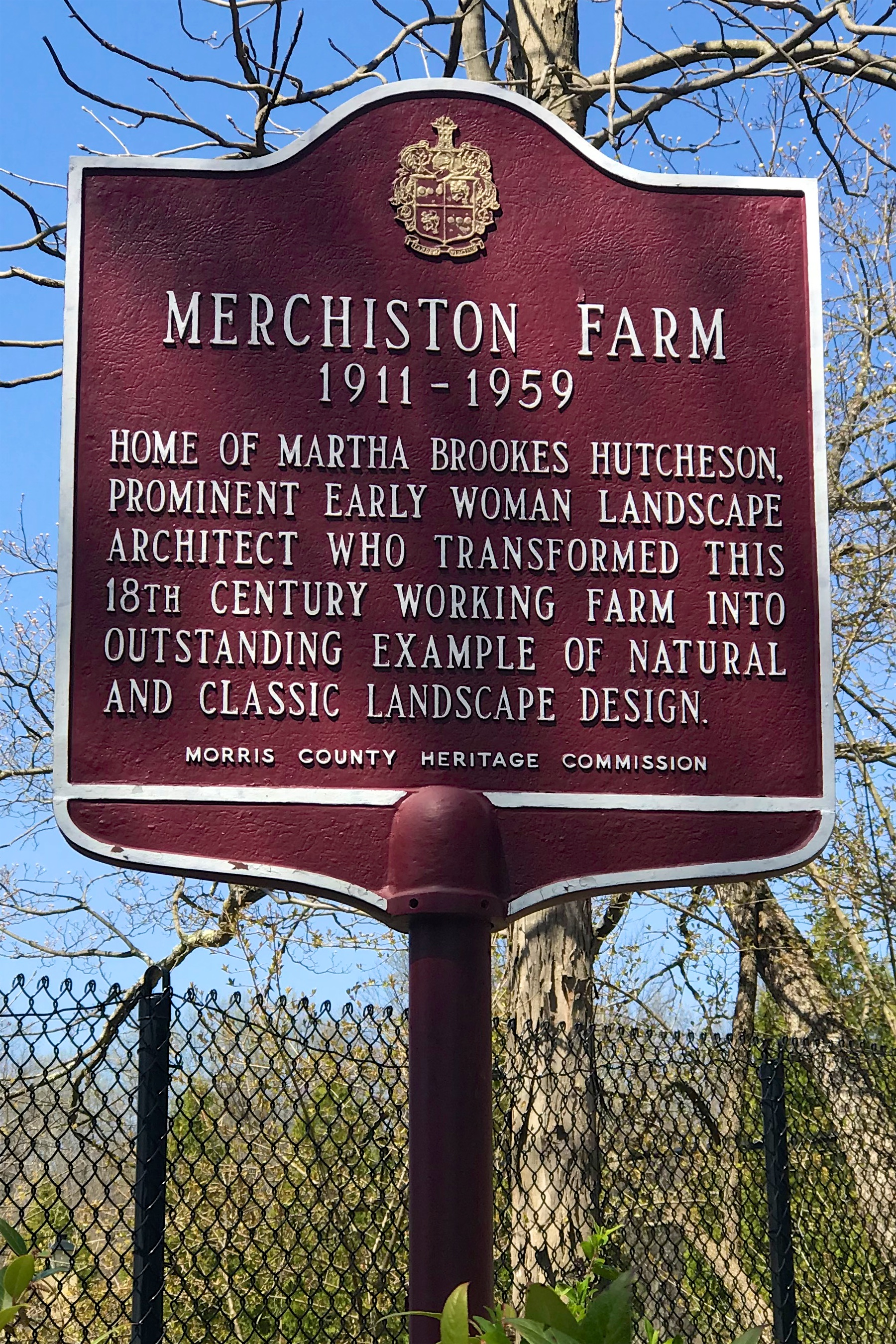
Merchiston Farm historical information

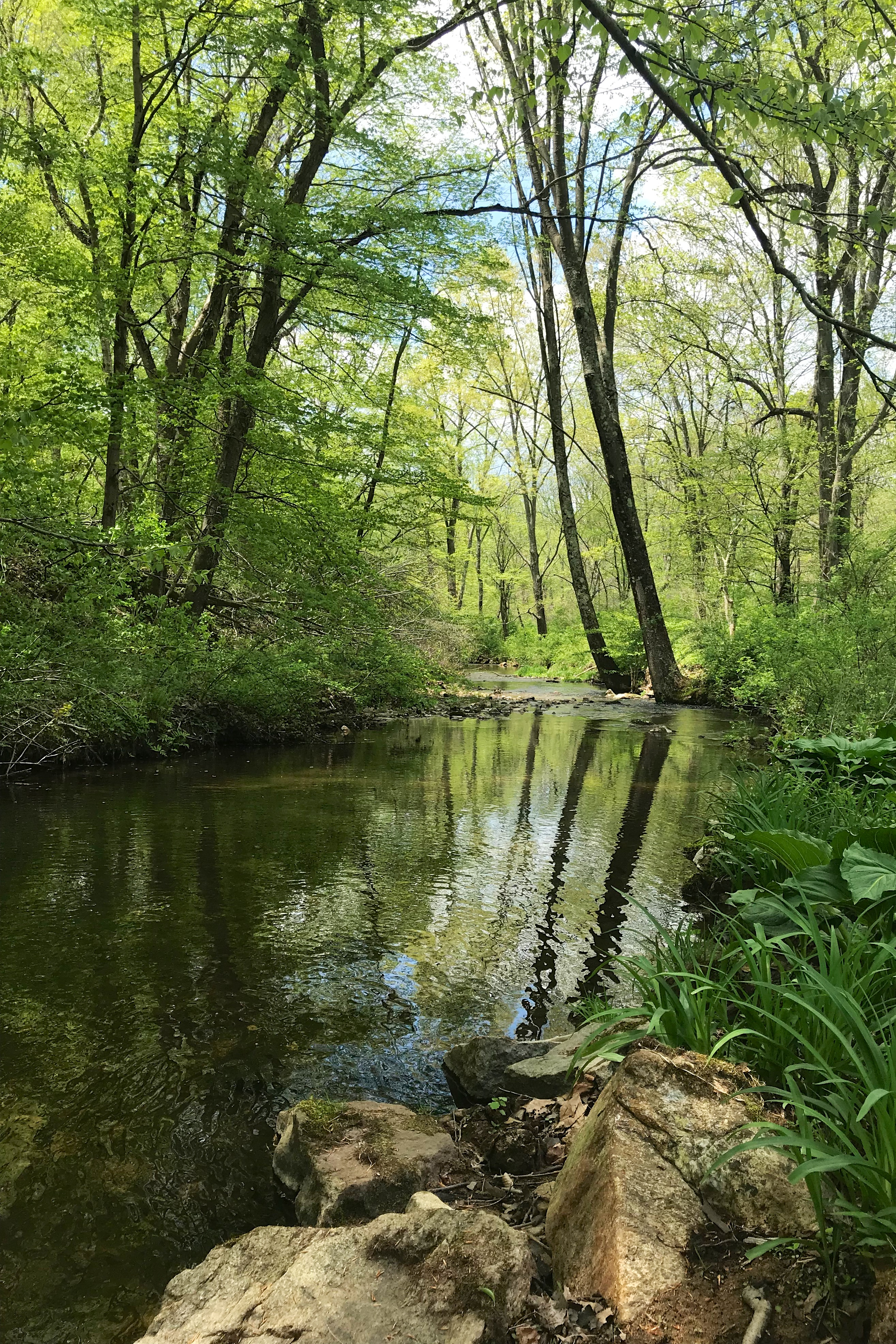
The namesake Bamboo Brook

== See also ==
- Willowwood Arboretum – adjoining park
- List of botanical gardens and arboretums in New Jersey
- National Register of Historic Places listings in Morris County, New Jersey
