= Martha Brookes Hutcheson =

American landscape architect, lecturer and author (1871-1959)

- Born: Martha Brookes Brown; October 2, 1871; New York City, New York, U.S.
- Died: July 23, 1959 (aged 87)
- Occupation: Landscape architect

Martha Brookes Hutcheson (October 2, 1871 – July 23, 1959) was an American landscape architect, lecturer, and author, active in New England, New York, and New Jersey.

== Biography ==
Hutcheson was born in New York City as Martha Brookes Brown, and as a child spent her summers on a family farm near Burlington, Vermont. From 1893 to 1895 she studied at the New York School of Applied Design for Women, and in the late 1890s toured Europe where she studied gardens in England, France, and Italy. As Hutcheson later wrote in The Spirit of the Garden:

About 1898, one day I saw the grounds of Bellevue Hospital in New York, on which nothing was planted, and was overcome with the terrible waste of opportunity for beauty which was not being given to the hundreds of patients who could see it or go to it, in convalescence. In trying to find out how I could get in touch with such authorities as those who might allow me to plant the area of ground, I stumbled upon the fact that my aim would be politically impossible, but that there was a course in Landscape Architecture being formed at the Massachusetts Institute of Technology, the first course which America had ever held.

In 1900 she entered MIT's new landscape architecture program at age 29, where she studied for two years before leaving without degree in 1902. She subsequently designed the grounds of several residential estates near Boston, most notably Frederick Moseley's large Newburyport estate, 1904-1906 (now Maudslay State Park), and the garden at Alice Mary Longfellow's house (now the Longfellow House–Washington's Headquarters National Historic Site) in Cambridge.

She also was the landscape architect for the Poplar Hill and Welwyn estates in Glen Cove, New York.

After Hutcheson's marriage in 1911, she retired from commercial practice but she began to landscape her own garden (5 acres) on the couple's 100-acre (0.40 km^{2}) farm in Chester Township, New Jersey. Its overall design was influenced by classical Italian gardens, featuring a pond enclosed by native plants, vegetable garden, flower borders, orchards, allées, and farm buildings. This farm, with garden, is now preserved as the Bamboo Brook Outdoor Education Center.

In 1935 she was named a fellow in the American Society of Landscape Architects, the third woman to receive this distinction. Although Hutcheson executed dozens of commissions, including gardens at Bennington College and Billings Farm (now the Marsh-Billings-Rockefeller National Historical Park), most of her works have been lost.

== Gallery ==
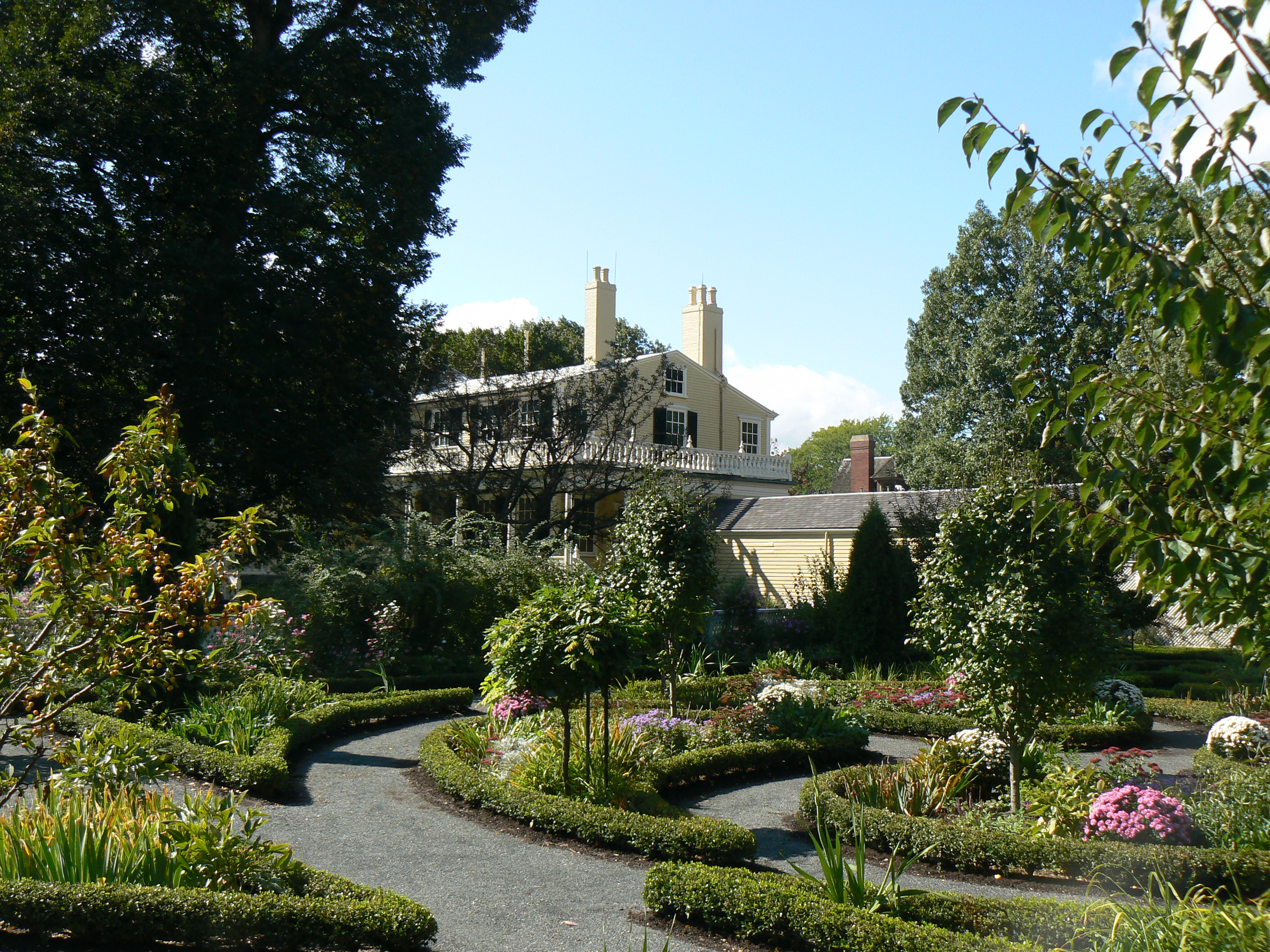
A portion of garden at Longfellow House–Washington's Headquarters National Historic Site, Cambridge, Massachusetts

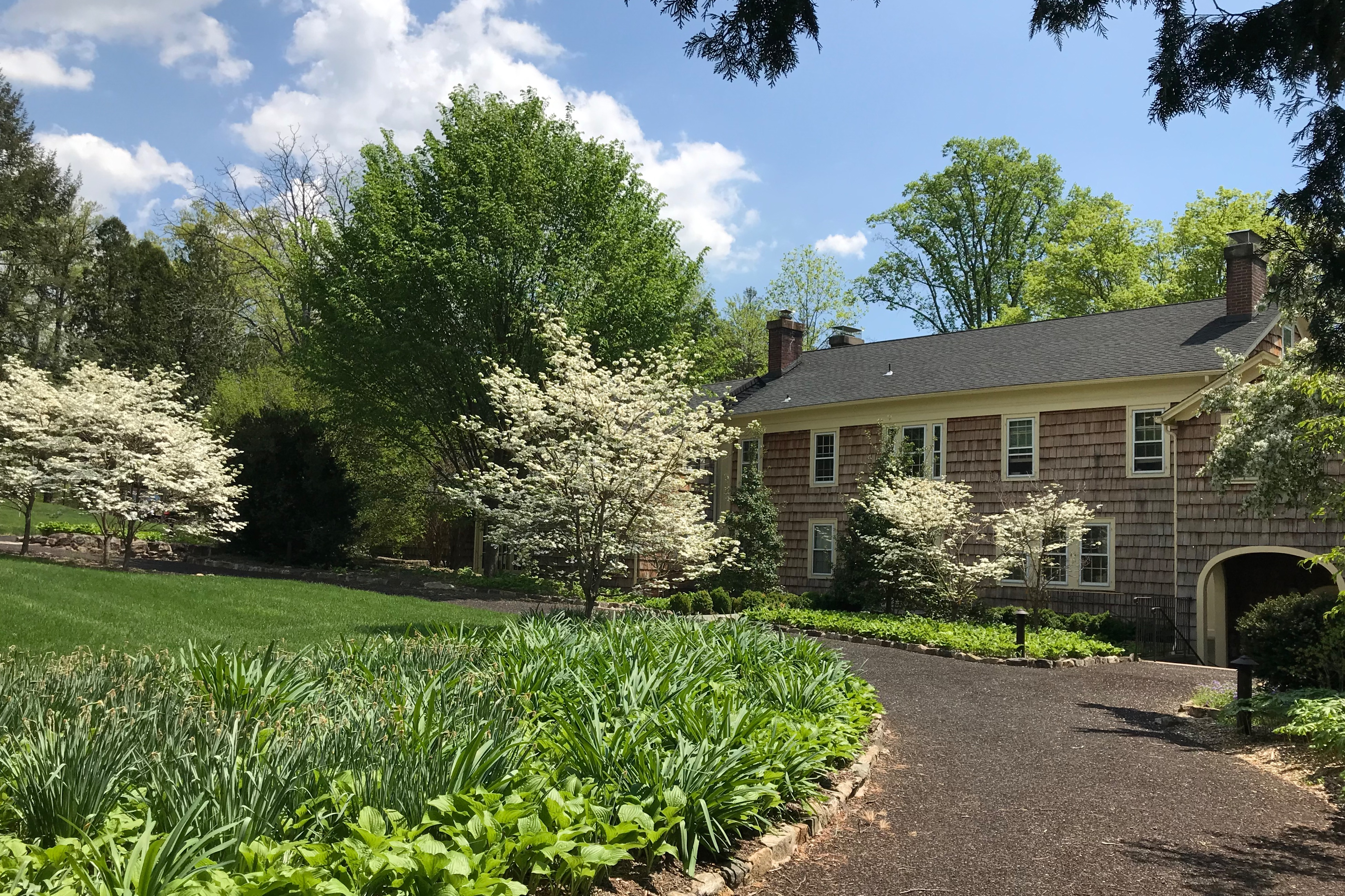
Dogwoods in bloom by her house at the Bamboo Brook Outdoor Education Center, Chester Township, New Jersey

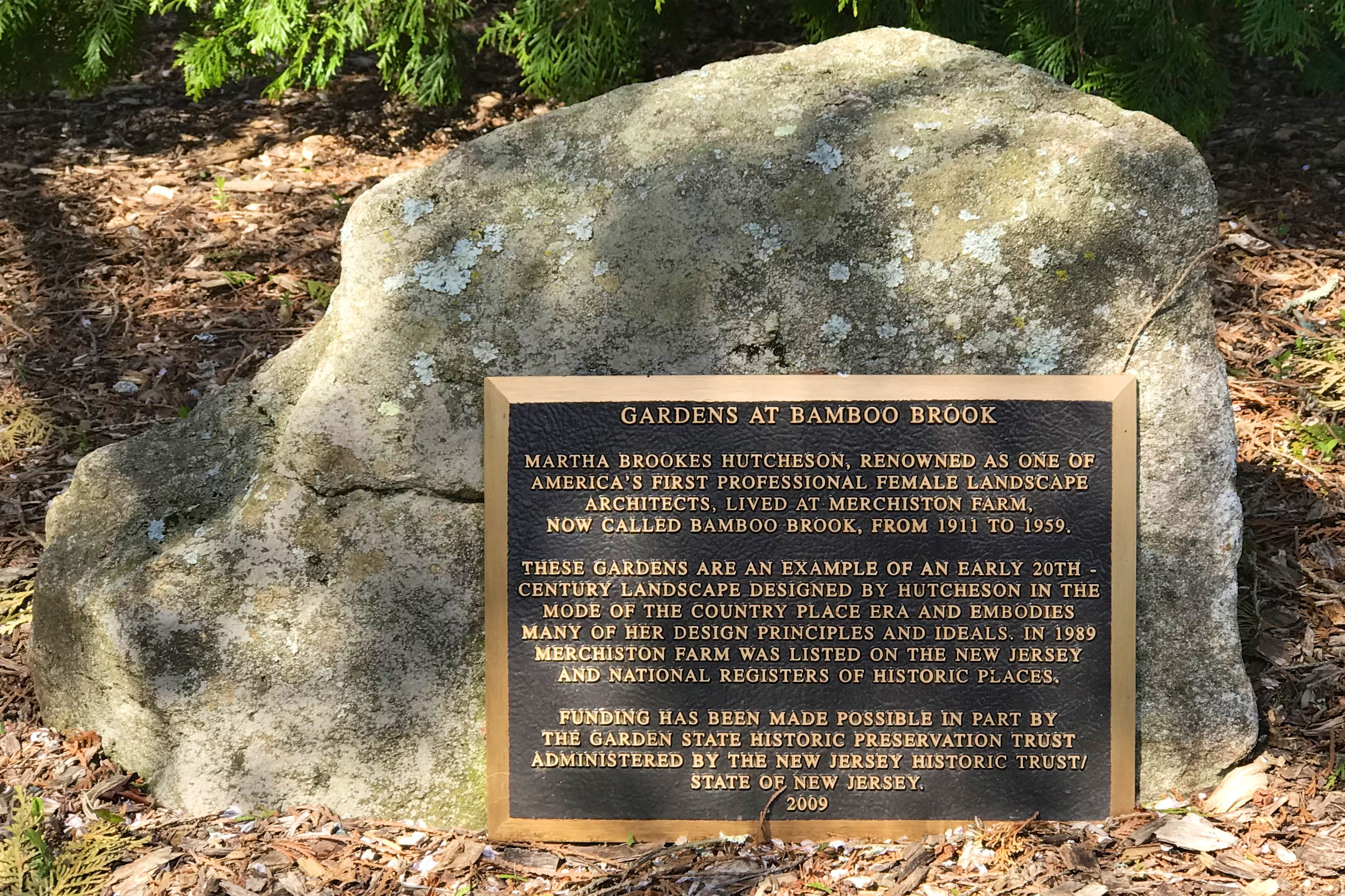
National Register of Historic Places plaque recognizing her work at the Merchiston Farm, now Bamboo Brook, from 1911 to 1959

== Selected works ==
- The Spirit of the Garden, 1923, reprinted by University of Massachusetts Press, 2001. ISBN 1-55849-272-0.
