= Loantaka Brook Reservation =

Park and nature reserve in New Jersey

Coordinates: 40.774123°N 74.461663°W

Location	Morris County, New Jersey
Length	5.1 miles (8.2 km)
- Trailheads
Use	Walking, biking, horseback riding, cross country skiing, recreation, rollerblading
Difficulty	Easy walking trails, medium horseback, ADA accessible
Surface	Asphalt and crushed limestone
Hours	Year-around, dawn to sunset
Amenities	Benches, playground, athletic fields, mounting blocks, restrooms, benches, picnic facilities at trailheads
Bathrooms	Three restrooms located throughout the trail

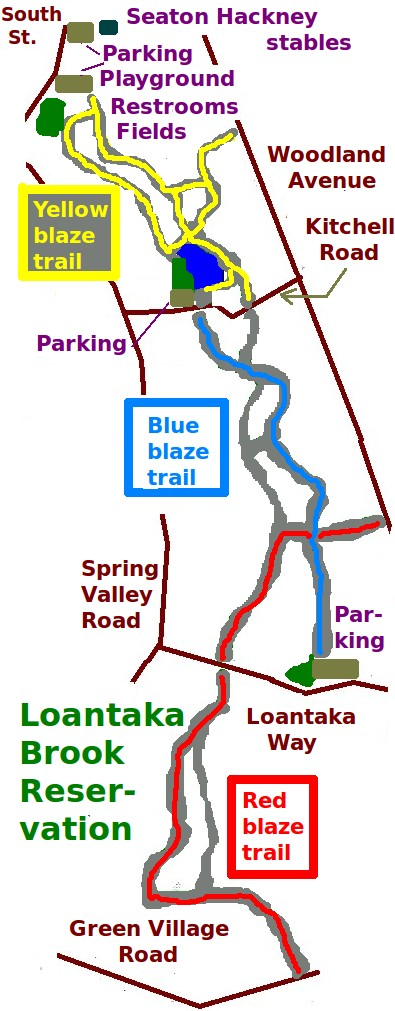

The Loantaka Brook Reservation is a nature reserve and public park in the American state of New Jersey in Morris County. It consists of five miles of nature trails for jogging, hiking, and biking. Seaton Hackney Stables, owned and operated by the Morris County Park Commission, offers horseback riding at an adjacent property with trail riding along a long and narrow corridor near the Loantaka Brook. It has four distinct areas including the South Street recreation facilities, the Seaton Hackney Stables, the Loantaka Brook area at Kitchell Road, and the Loantaka Way Trail.

== History ==
=== Lenape ownership ===
Around the year 1000, the Morristown area was inhabited by Munsee Lenape people. Circa 1500, Morris County was part of the Lenapehoking, i.e., modern-day New Jersey. Arrowheads found in Munsee encampments throughout the Washington Valley suggest that they hunted wolf, elk, and wild turkey for game and likely ate mussels from the Whippany River.

In 1757, colonists of the "New Jersey Association for Helping the Indians" forcibly relocated some 200 Lenape to Brotherton, New Jersey. In 1801, some members of the tribe voluntarily traveled to join the Oneidas' reservation in Stockbridge, New York after receiving an invitation from the Oneidas. However, colonists again expelled Lenape families in Stockbridge to Green Bay, Wisconsin in 1822.

=== 18th century ===
During the Revolutionary War, from January to May 1777, some of George Washington's troops camped in the Loantaka Valley, while he stayed at Arnold's Tavern on the Morristown Green.

The land had been private property until the twentieth century when large connecting plots were donated by various community members to form what is known today as The Loantaka Brook Reservation. The Reservation began as a public park after the Seaton Hackney Stables were added to the park system through a donation from Mr. and Mrs. Paul Moore in the 1900s. The Loantaka Brook Reservation began official service in 1957.

A subsequent addition was made by Helen Hartley Jenkins Wood. The wooded area was donated by Marcellus Hartley Dodge Sr. and Geraldine Rockefeller Dodge. The donation by Mr. and Mrs. Dodge helped to bring together the two largest tracts of land in the reservation. The trail system is part of 570 acres in one of New Jersey's most populated counties. In the past, the trail was mostly used by hikers and horseback riders, but since the creation of trails with multiple surfaces, including a car-wide macadam trail as well as dirt and gravel trails, the park has become more user friendly for cyclists, rollerbladers, and other outdoor enthusiasts.

There are reports of efforts to try to expand the system in the future, possibly by connecting the Loantaka trails with those of the nearby Great Swamp National Wildlife Refuge.

In 2009, there was a report of new acres being added to the system based on a donation by Helen Mead Platt.

=== Design and construction ===
The trails at the Loantaka Brook Reservation are divided into three separate micro-trails. The first portion, known as the Yellow Blaze Trail, starts at the South Street entrance near the horse stables, and continues south until Kitchell Road. The Yellow Blaze section is unique in that it consists of two separate trails that run side-by-side. A crushed limestone trail for horses is visible from the macadam portion of the trail that was repaved in 2012. This pattern of intertwining trails extends through the middle section of trail known as the Blue Blaze Trails. The last portion, The Red Blaze, is the least developed and consists of only macadam surfaces. The park generally has no major hills to climb and has been deemed suitable for young children on bicycles, according to one report.

=== Park management ===
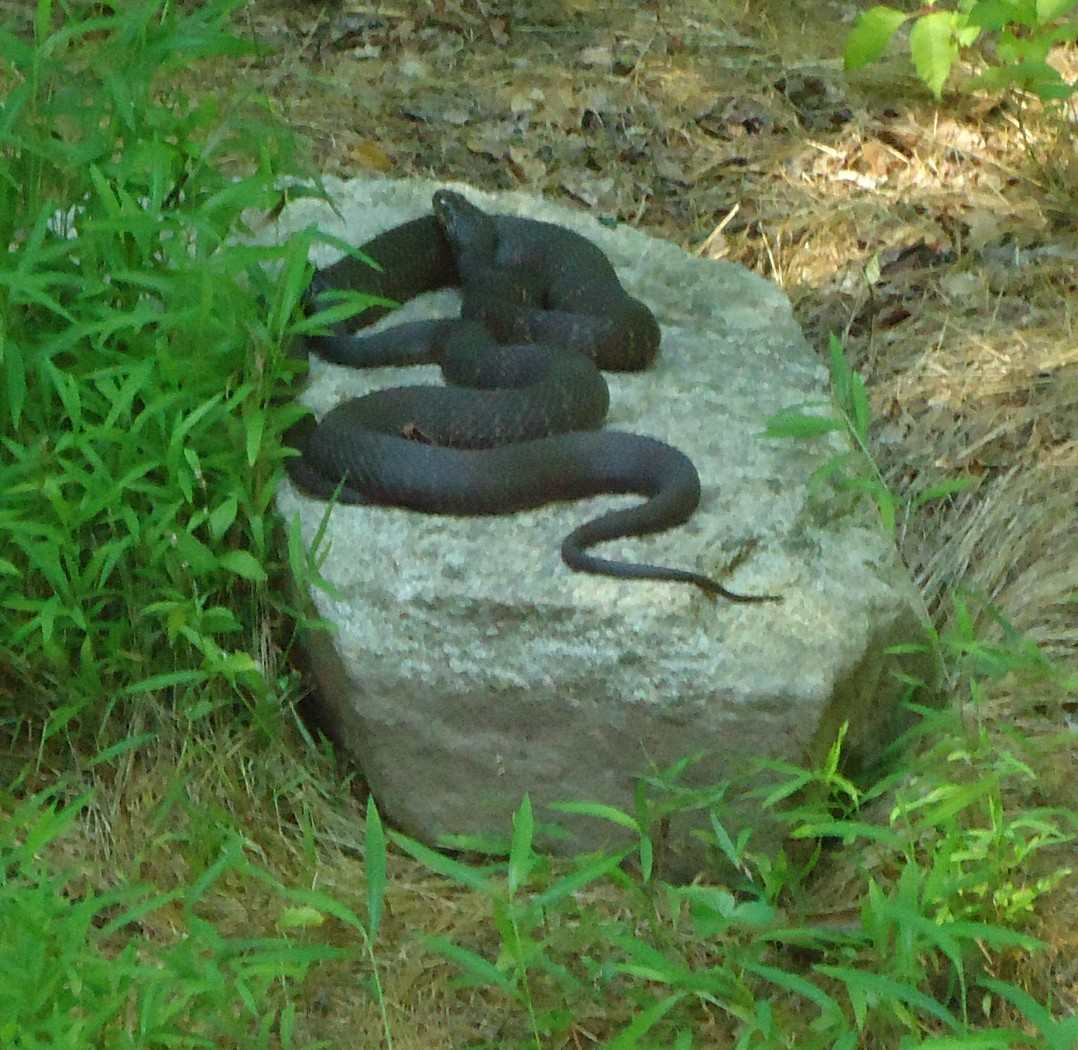
Two snakes, each about four feet long, cuddling on a rock

The park is one of many places in which supervised hunts have taken place as a means to curb deer overpopulation, with warning signs posted prominently. In winter, ice sometimes covers portions of the trails. In addition, the pond near Kitchell Road sometimes has been overrun with Canada geese, but efforts to discourage the geese have met with mixed success.

=== Amenities ===
The trail features two types of surfaces—an asphalt car-wide surface for bicyclists and packed gravel and limestone trails for horses and joggers. There are parking lots at three locations near entrances. The restrooms along the Loantaka Way Trails are cleaned daily during the summer and each rest area features a working water fountain except during the winter. In addition, there are picnic areas and grills near the South Street and Kitchell Road entrances. There is a children's play area near the South Street entrance.

=== Community support ===
The Loantaka Brook Reservation is maintained by the Morris County Parks Commission and is currently in the process of being reviewed. There have been renovations such as a macadam surfaced trail and newly added picnic areas. The park has been the venue for bicycle races, music, and fund-raising events. There are annual cleanup events held in the springtime to remove invasive plants and to plant native plants, with volunteers wearing long pants and boots expected to get wet. In 2010, New York Jets football player Jim Leonhard participated in an event on the reservation to raise funds to counter childhood obesity.

== Gallery ==
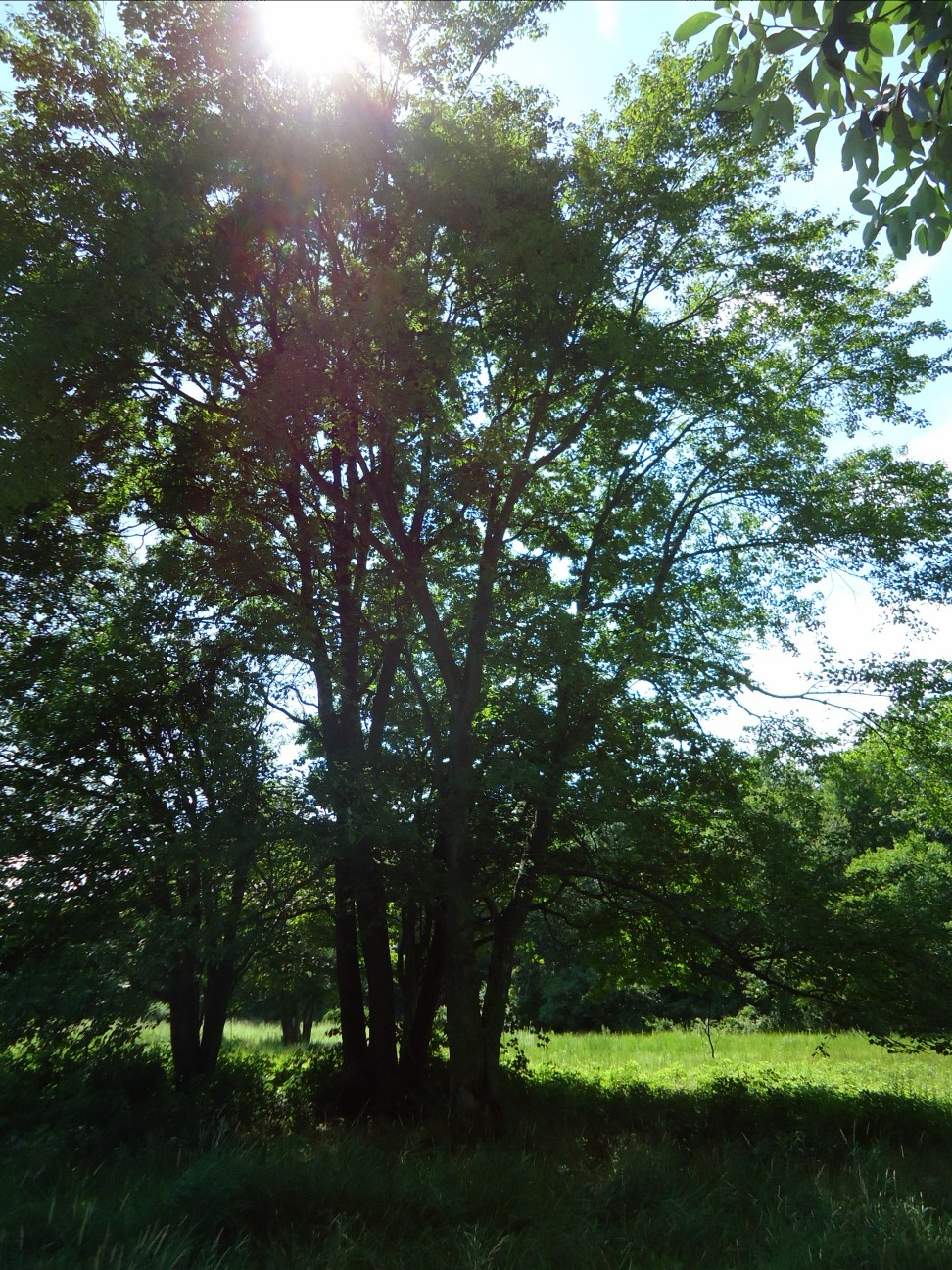
Sunlight through a tree

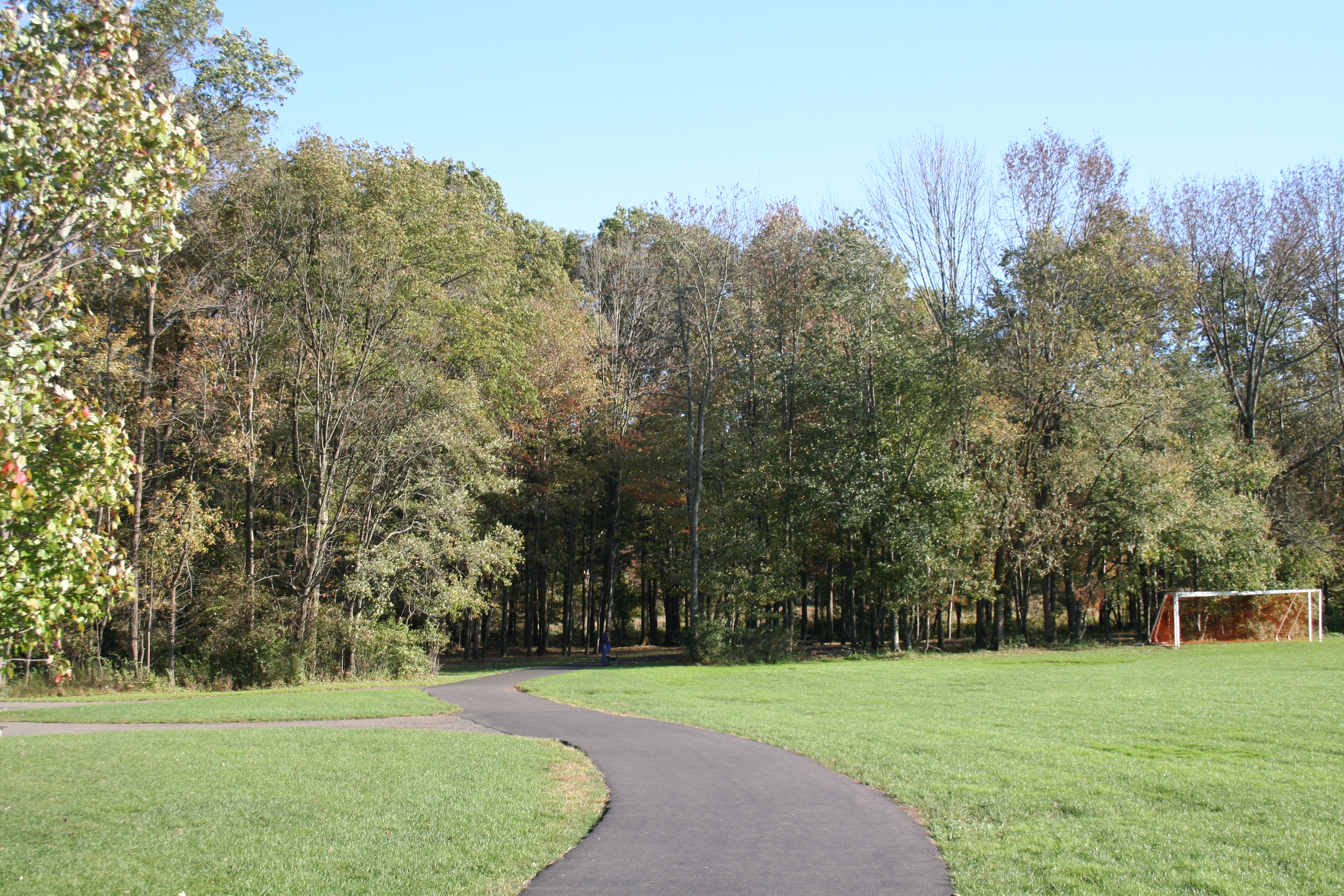
Entrance to the Blue Blaze Trail

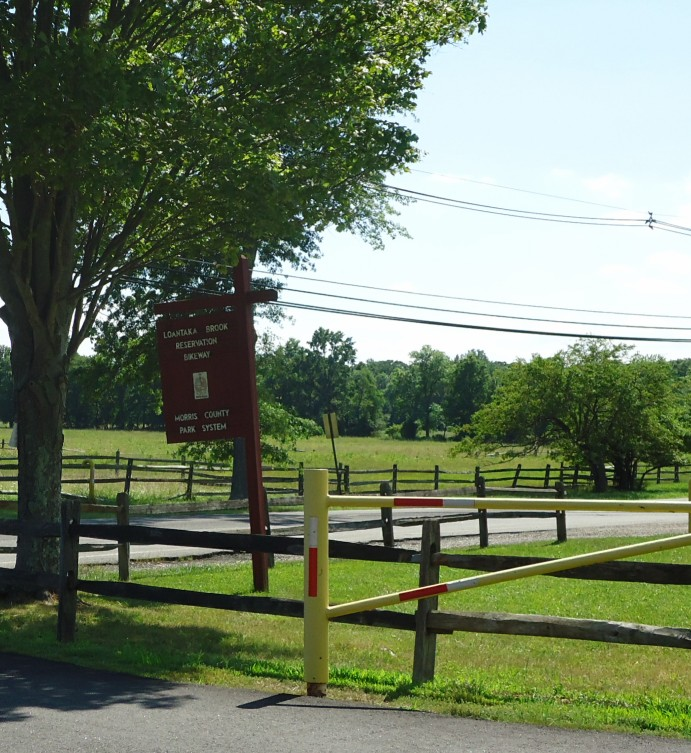
Loantaka Way entrance

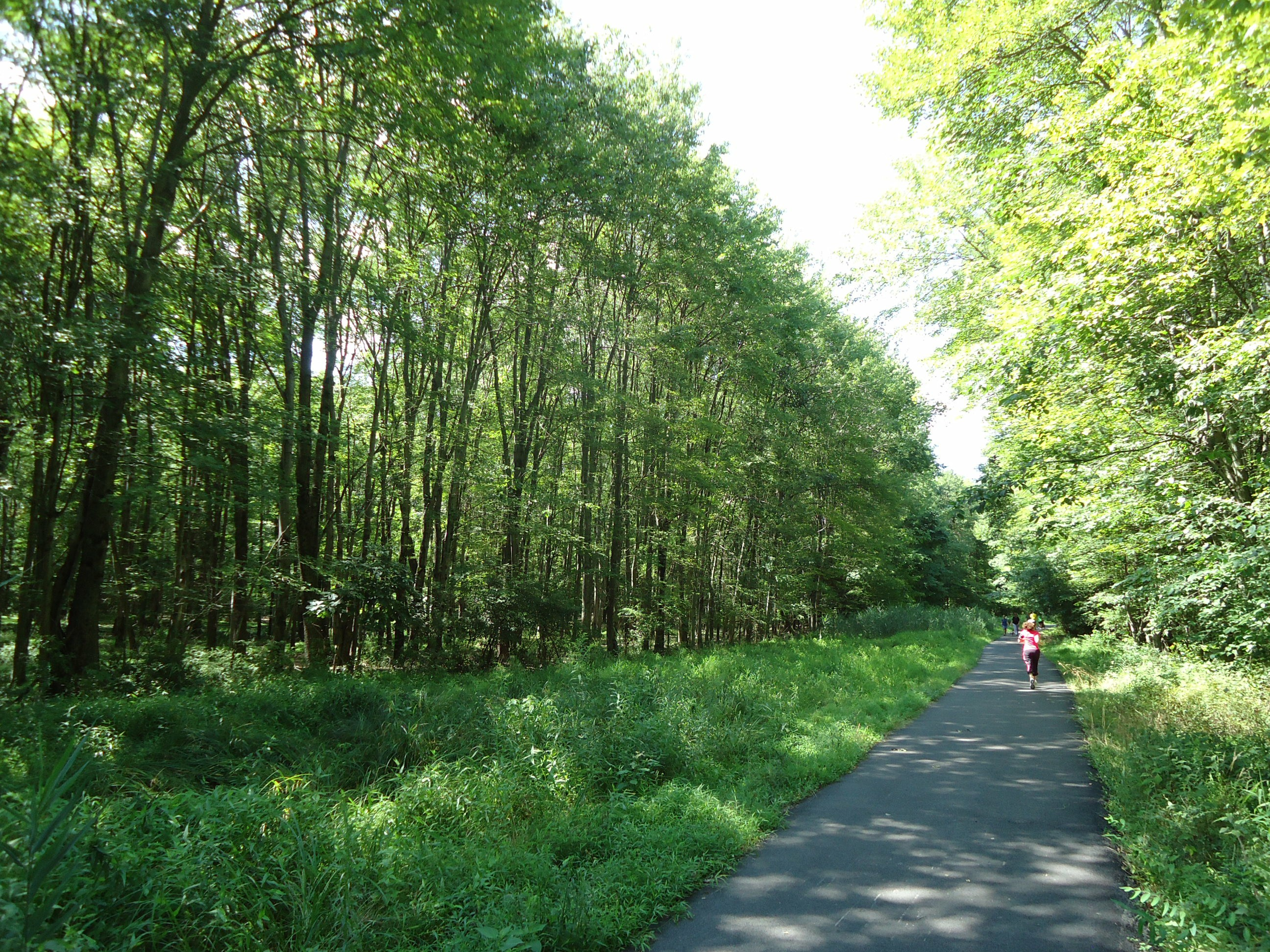
Macadam bike path

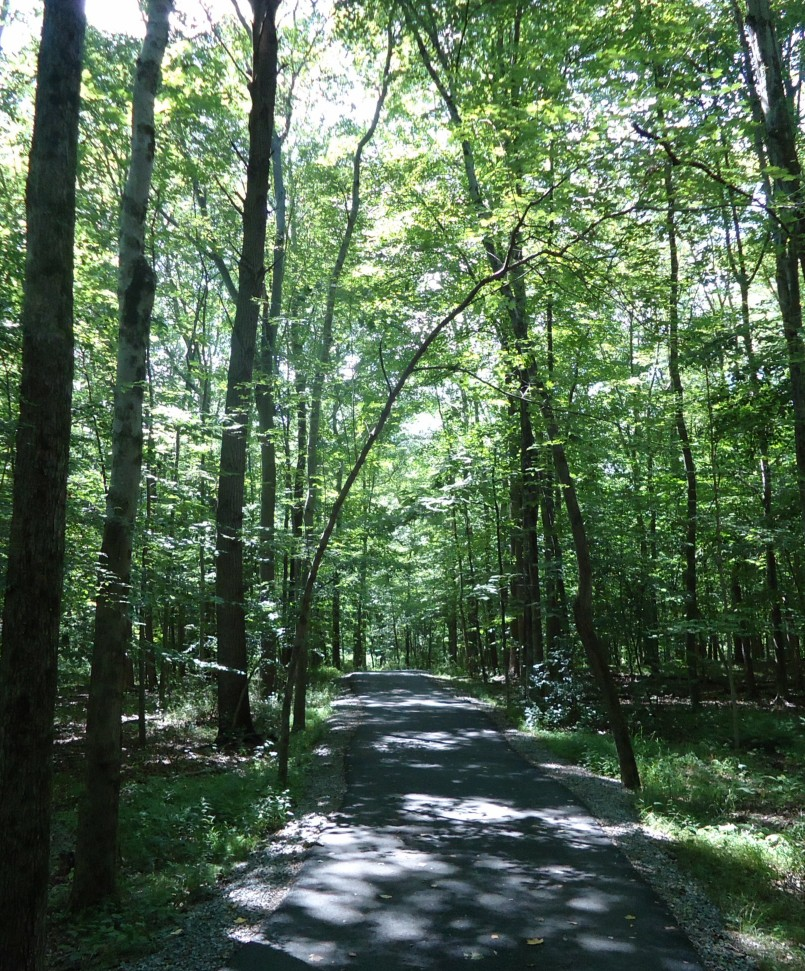
Pathway through the woods

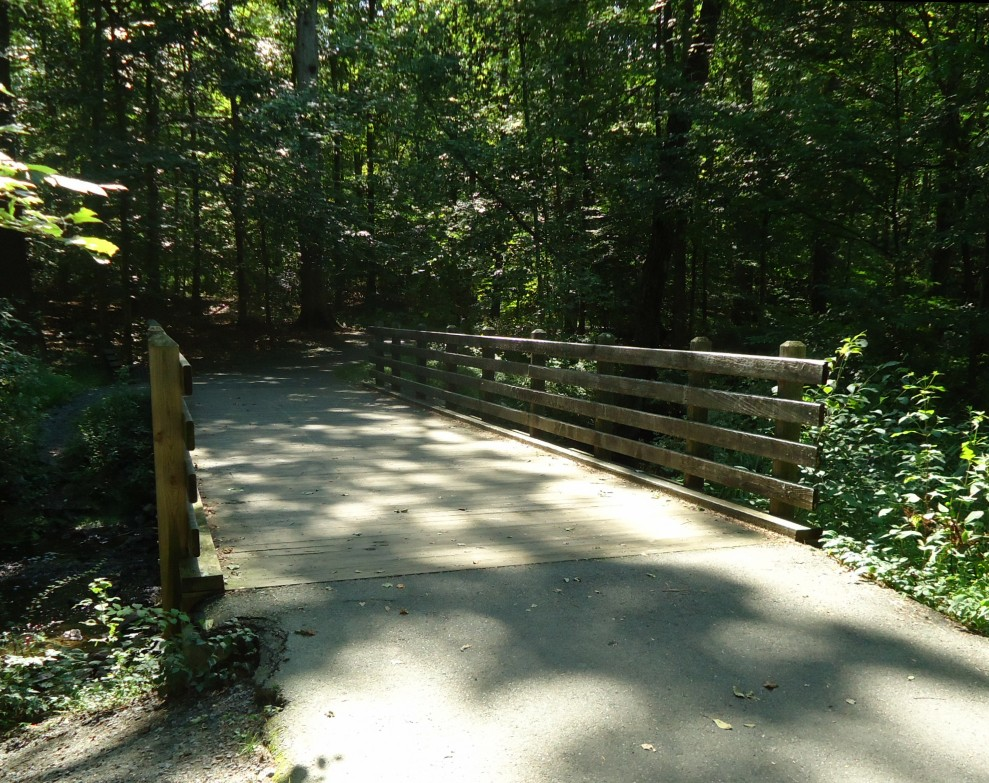
Bridge

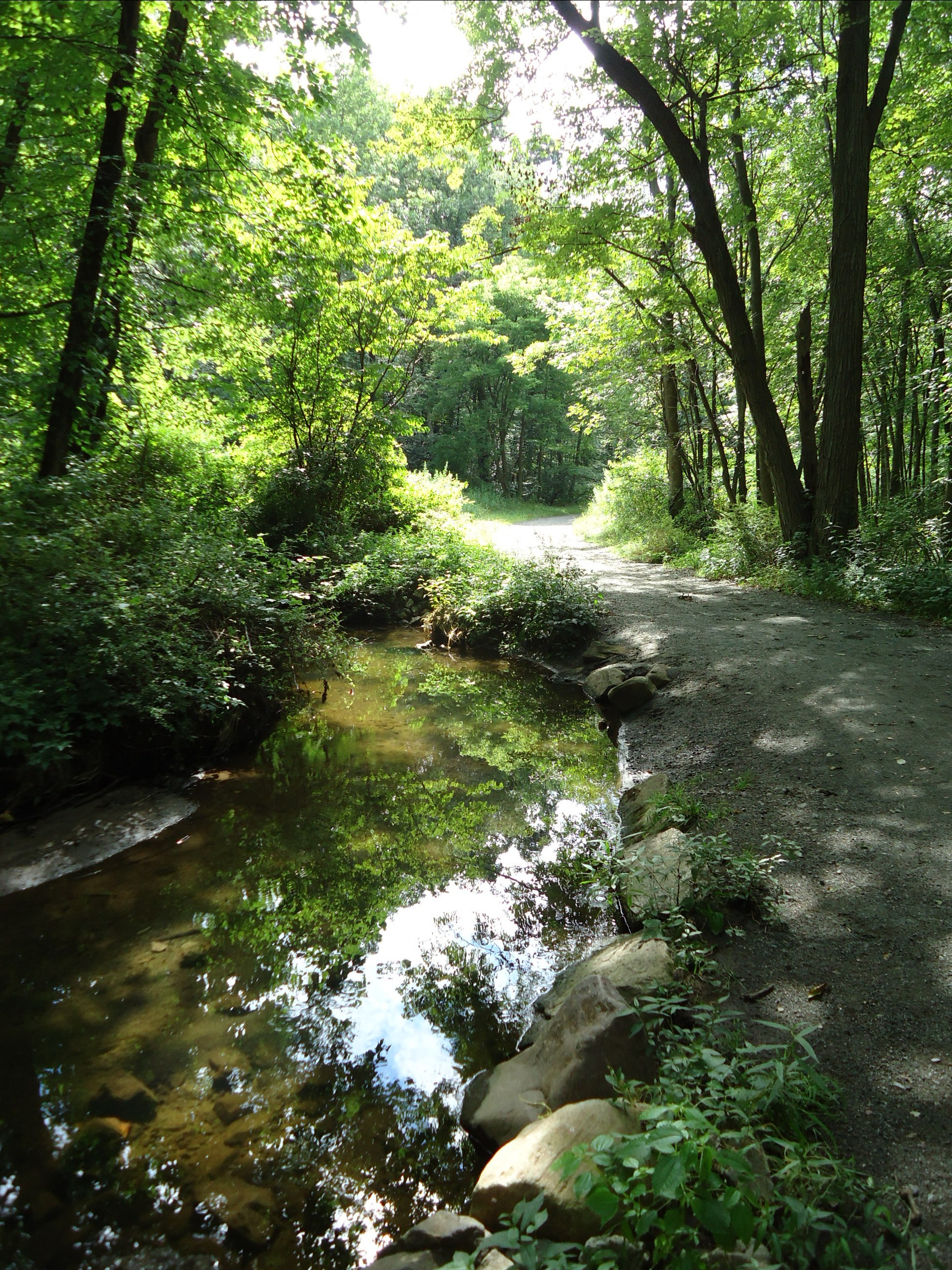
Horse path

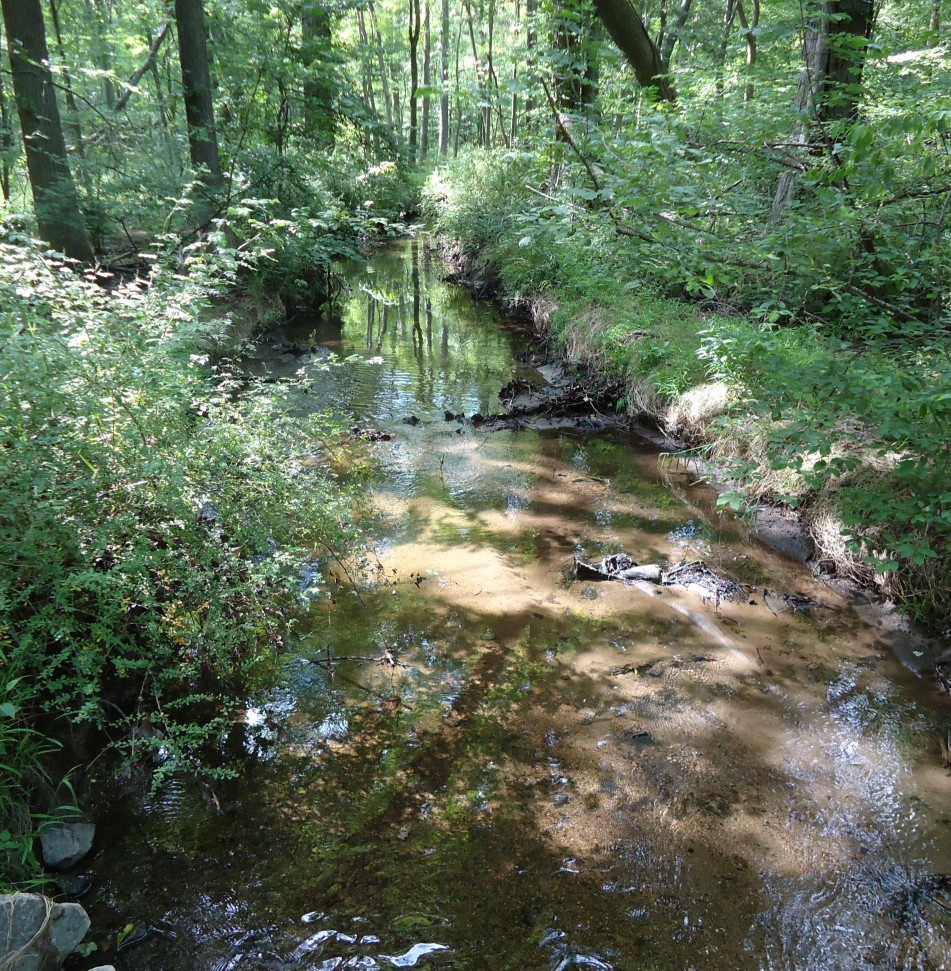
Stream

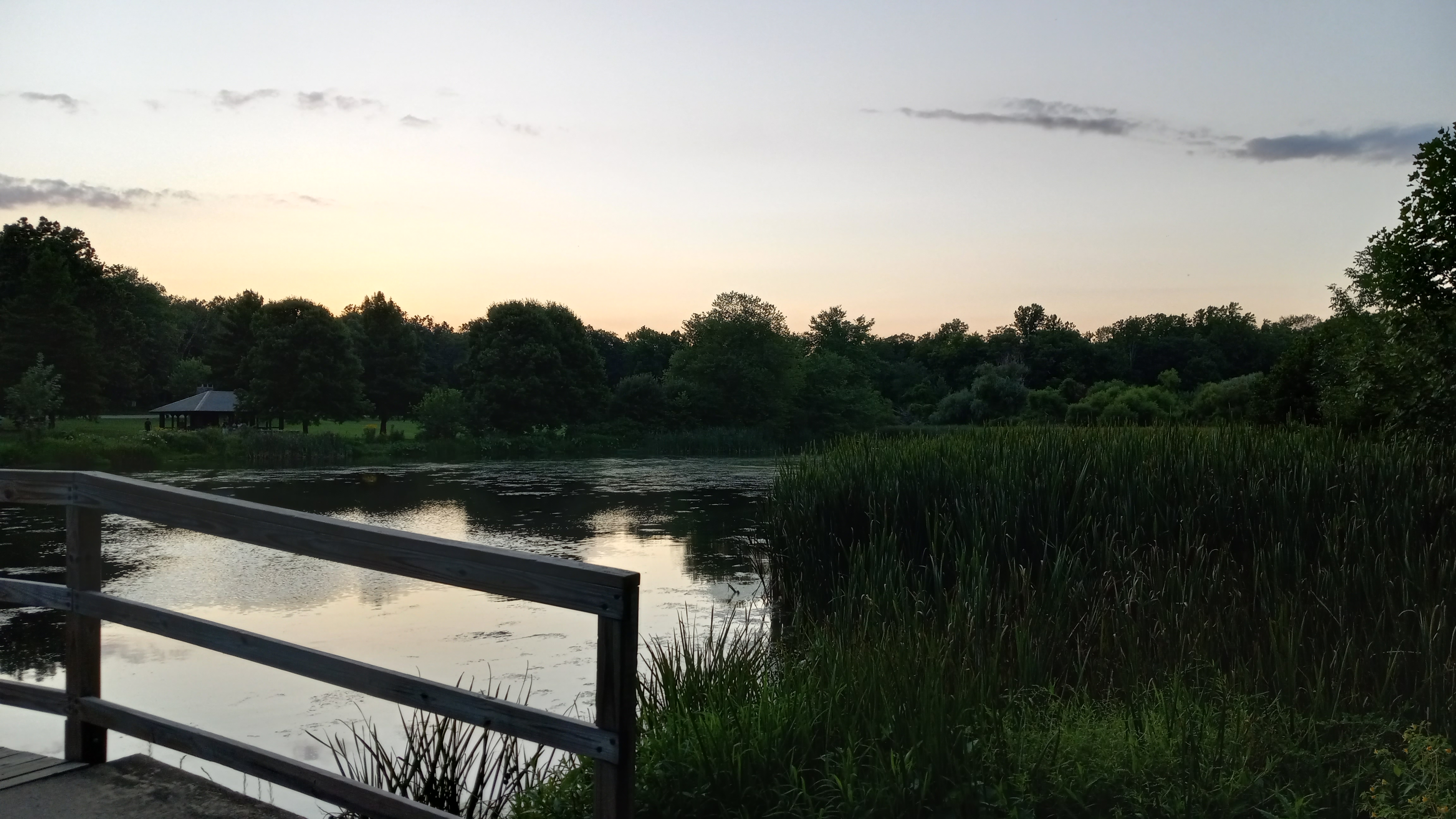
Kitchell Pond at sunset
