= Loantaka Brook =

River in the United States

Coordinates: 40.755244°N 74.455837°W

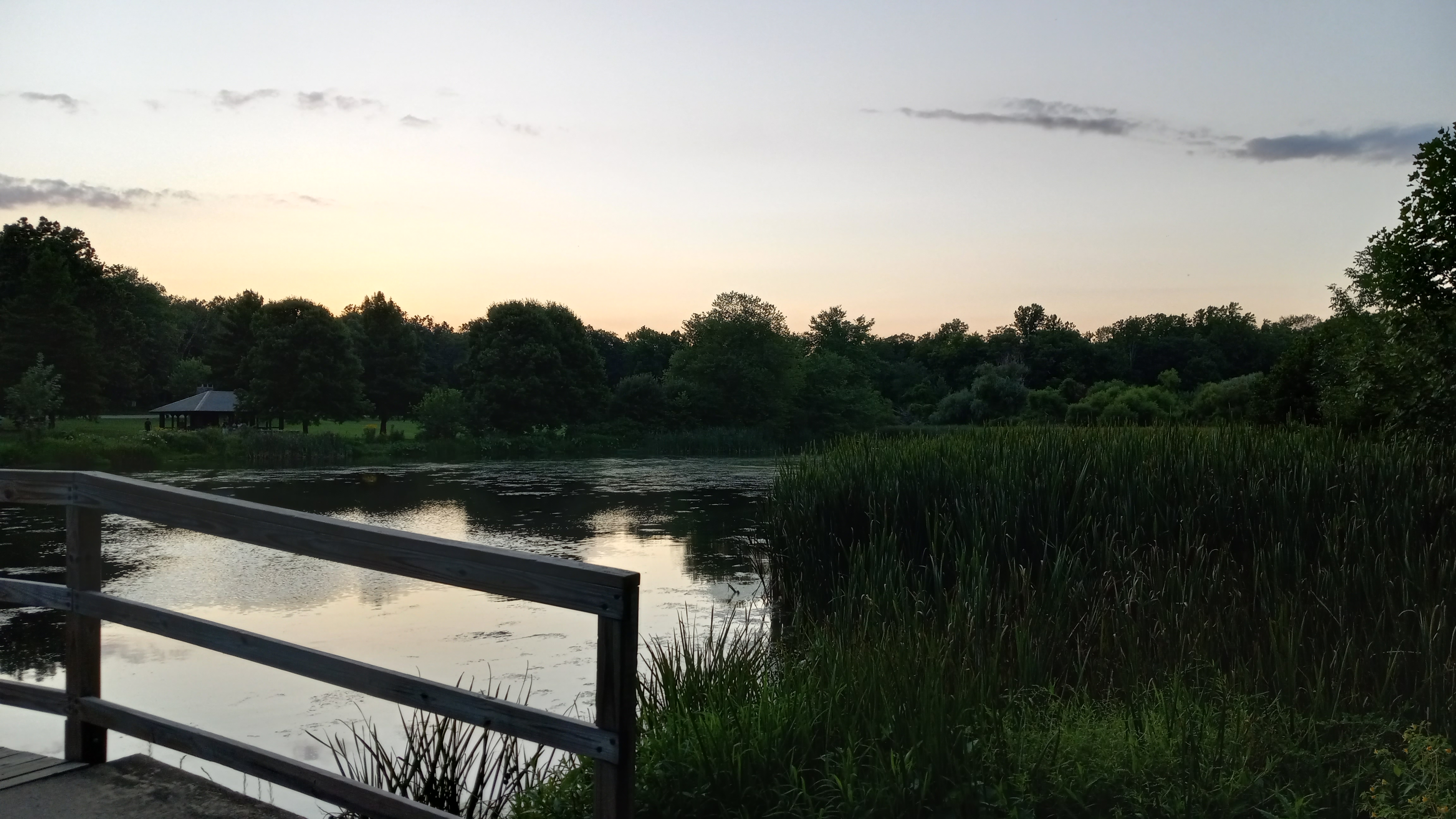
Kitchell Pond, created by a dam in Loantaka Brook

Loantaka Brook is a tributary of the Passaic River in New Jersey in the United States.

The main headwaters of Loantaka Brook arise in Morris Township between Route 124 (Madison Avenue) and Woodland Avenue in the area just below the medical office parks on the south side of Madison Avenue (see map). This primary headwaters stem flows just south of the Parsons Village apartment complex and to the west of the Woodland Elementary School. After passing the school it crosses Woodland Avenue between the Ginty playing fields and the Morris Township municipal buildings and police department and then makes its way past the Woodland Sewage treatment plant. A second, smaller stem arises to the south and west of Friendly’s on Madison Avenue, where it makes its way through a culvert and down along a stretch of garden apartments before joining the first stem near the elementary school.

A second headwater tributary of Loantaka arises near South Street in Morris Township behind the Nortel Networks offices. This tributary flows across South Street into the Loantaka Brook Reservation on the south side of the ballfield at the Reservation entrance. This tributary joins the main stem below the Woodland Water Treatment plant.

Below the confluence of the two stems, the brook has been dammed to form Kitchell Pond. After leaving the pond, the stream flows roughly three miles through the 574-acre (2.32 km^{2}) Loantaka Brook Reservation, where it then joins the Great Swamp National Wildlife Refuge . This linear park, one of the most heavily used of all of the Morris County parks, offers numerous recreational opportunities, from running and rollerblading to cycling and horseback riding. The brook is visible along much of the Reservation's paved and unpaved paths, offering passersby a glimpse into its current conditions and, hopefully, at the remediation efforts to repair the stream in the future.

Despite (or perhaps in part because of) its popularity, Loantaka Brook is the most degraded stream in the watershed, meeting none of the Ten Towns Committee’s June 2002 standards. The reasons for this impairment are two-fold, arising from non-point source pollution and excessive water volume in the stream channel.

To address the first issue, the Great Swamp Watershed Association, under its Adopt-A-Stream program, has begun testing Loantaka Brook to determine the sources and types of pollutants that enter the brook upstream. Designed to supplement the ongoing stream monitoring, the program tests for the presence of Total dissolved solids (TDS); (b) E. coli contaminants; and (c) nutrients (phosphorus and nitrates) and sedimentation, as indicated by the presence of Total suspended solids (TSS). Information gained from Loantaka’s plight will help project staff in designing a remediation program for the stream, which in turn will serve as a pilot for adopting Great Swamp’s other streams.

Excess water volume in Loantaka further impacts its health. The Woodland Water Treatment Plant upstream of Kitchell Pond alters Loantaka by discharging thousands of gallons of treated effluent into the stream every day. A discharge at such levels scours the stream's banks, eroding sand and undercutting streamside vegetation and trees. In addition, hundreds of storm drains located throughout residential and commercial developments transport stormwater runoff directly to the stream. The combination of effluent from the sewage treatment plant and excessive stormwater impairs water quality downstream because silt and sediments block sunlight and increase turbidity. Excess water volume also widens the stream and makes it shallower, raising water temperatures and making it impossible for certain native species to flourish. Loantaka has, in fact, the lowest species concentration of any of Great Swamp’s streams. Together with other organizations, the GSWA may be able to work to remediate the negative effects of such discharge into Loantaka, thereby elevating the health of the stream and revitalizing this crucial Great Swamp tributary.

Loantaka Brook joins Great Brook at the edge of the parking lot at the end of Woodland Road in the Great Swamp National Wildlife Refuge.

== See also ==
- List of rivers in New Jersey
