= Lewis W. Barton Arboretum =

Arboretum and nature preserve in Medford Township, New Jersey

Barton Arboretum & Nature Preserve
- Location within Burlington County, New Jersey
- Type: Arboretum; Nature preserve
- Location: Medford Leas
- Nearest town: Medford, New Jersey
- Coordinates: 39.9052°N 74.8161°W
- Area: 168 acres (68 ha)
- Created: 1981
- Owner: The Estaugh
- Status: Open all year
- Habitats: Woodlands
- Collections: Pinetum, conifer, holly, rhododendron woodland, viburnum, and crabapple collections
- Accreditation: Arbnet Arboretum Accreditation Program
- Website: Official website

The Barton Arboretum & Nature Preserve is a 168-acre (0.68 km^{2}) arboretum and nature preserve located in Medford Township. The arboretum is situated on the grounds of Medford Leas , a not-for-profit, Quaker-related community for adults age 55 and older.

The arboretum is on the edge of the Pine Barrens and includes landscaped grounds, courtyard gardens, wildflower meadows, natural woodlands, and wetlands, as well as tree collections. It was created with the assistance of the Morris Arboretum of the University of Pennsylvania. The Morris Arboretum continues to provide technical support.

Attractions include the Pinetum an international collection of exotic pines, a conifer collection, a 0.5-acre (2,000 m^{2}) rhododendron woodland, holly, viburnum, and crabapple collections, and an experimental planting of chestnut trees being grown in cooperation with The American Chestnut Foundation. The arboretum also once had the New Jersey State Champion Carya cordiformis tree, but it was struck by lightning in the fall of 1997 destroying it. The fallen tree and stump still remains in place however.

The Arboretum is a member of Greater Philadelphia Gardens as well as the American Association of Public Gardens and is open to the public seven days a week from dawn till dusk, free of charge.

== See also ==
- List of botanical gardens in the United States
