= Leaming's Run Gardens =

Former flower gardens in New Jersey, US

Coordinates: 39.1432°N 74.7675°W

Leaming's Run Gardens (30 acres) were flower gardens located at 1845 US Route 9 North, Swainton, in Middle Township, New Jersey. The gardens are now indefinitely closed.

The gardens were designed and created by Jack and Emily Aprill and children, and opened to the public in 1977. Until closure, Leaming's Run Gardens claimed to be the largest annual flower garden in the United States. It consisted of the following gardens: Blue and Red Garden, Blue and White garden, Celosia Garden, Down Jersey Garden (heat-loving plants), English Cottage Garden, Hibiscus Garden, Orange Garden, Pink Garden, Red and White Garden, Reflection Garden, Serpentine Garden (red salvia), Shades of Rose Garden (roses underplanted with rose-colored flowers), Sweetheart Garden (pinks and purple), and Yellow Garden.

Leaming's Garden received its name from a long stream that ran through the land. The stream was known as "Uncle Aaron Leaming's Run." Jack and Emily Aprill, as mentioned above, purchased the property in 1957 and intended to make the gardens gorgeous and have other people enjoy the beauty of nature.

== See also ==
- New Jersey botanical gardens
