= Willowwood Arboretum =

Arboretum and public park in Chester Township, New Jersey, United States

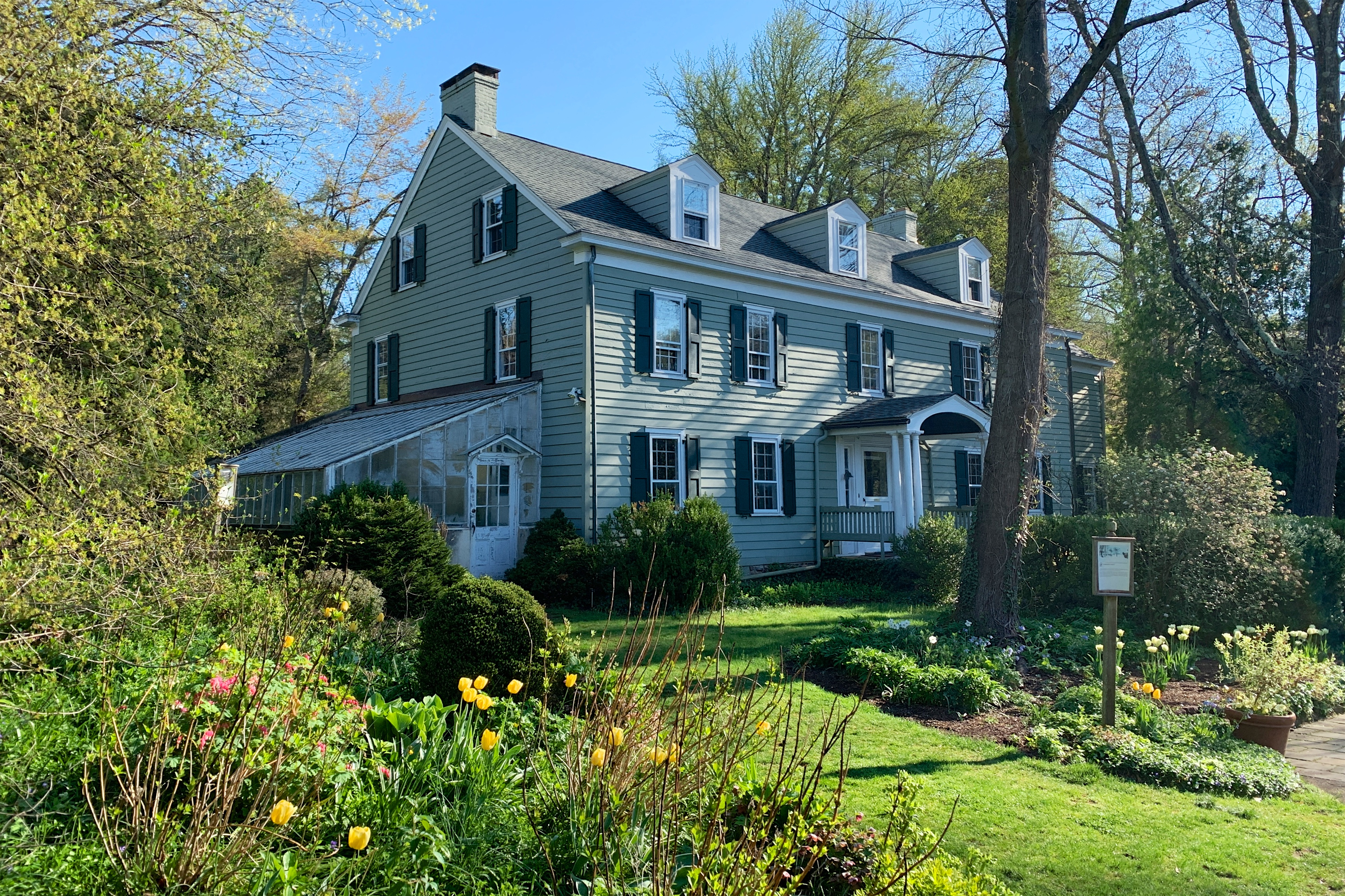
- Tubbs House and conservatory

- Location within Morris County, New Jersey Location within New Jersey Location within the United States
- Type: Arboretum
- Location: 300 Longview Road; Chester Township, New Jersey
- Coordinates: 40°43′34″N 74°41′56″W
- Area: 131 acres (53 ha)
- Operator: Morris County Parks Commission
- Website: Official website

Willowwood Arboretum, 131 acres (53 ha), is an arboretum and public park located at 300 Longview Road, Chester Township, New Jersey, Morris County, New Jersey. It is part of the Morris County Park System and is open to the public daily.

The location was first cleared for farming in the 18th century, which led to the formation of the meadows that now exist on the property. It was originally named Paradise Farm before being bought by Henry and Robert Tubbs in 1908, who then renamed the property Willowwood after the natural collection of willow trees that exist in the area. They expanded the farmhouse that dates back to 1792 and made it into their family home. Both amateur horticulturalists, the brothers collected and grew many specimens over the next half century, including a vast collection of rare and exotic species, thanks in part to the popular New York horticultural scene at the dawn of the 20th century. Afterward, the property was formed into a private arboretum and run by Rutgers University as a plant and tree research facility. It then became part of the Morris County Park System in 1980.

The arboretum consists of both wild forest and tended tree collections, farmland, a residence with two small gardens and a handful of smaller out-buildings. There are about 3,500 types of native and exotic plants, many rare in cultivation. The historic collections include oak, maple, willow, magnolia, lilac, cherry, fir, pine, a superb specimen of Dawn Redwood (Metasequoia) now more than 98 feet (30 m) tall, masses of ferns and handsome stands of field and forest wildflowers.

Both wild and cultivated plantings can be seen on self-guiding tours through informal paths in open areas and woodlands.

== Gallery ==
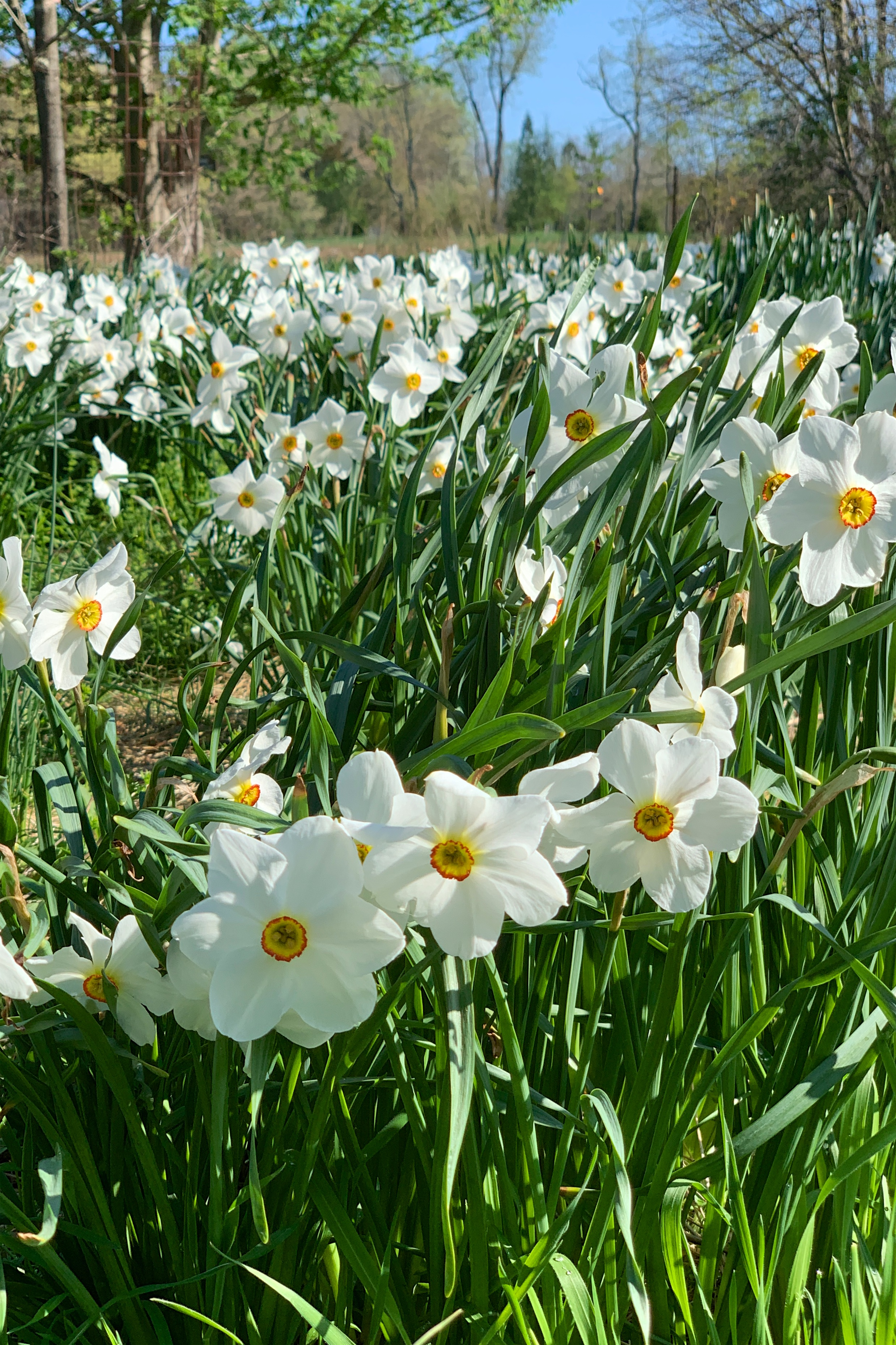
Field of daffodils (Narcissus) in bloom

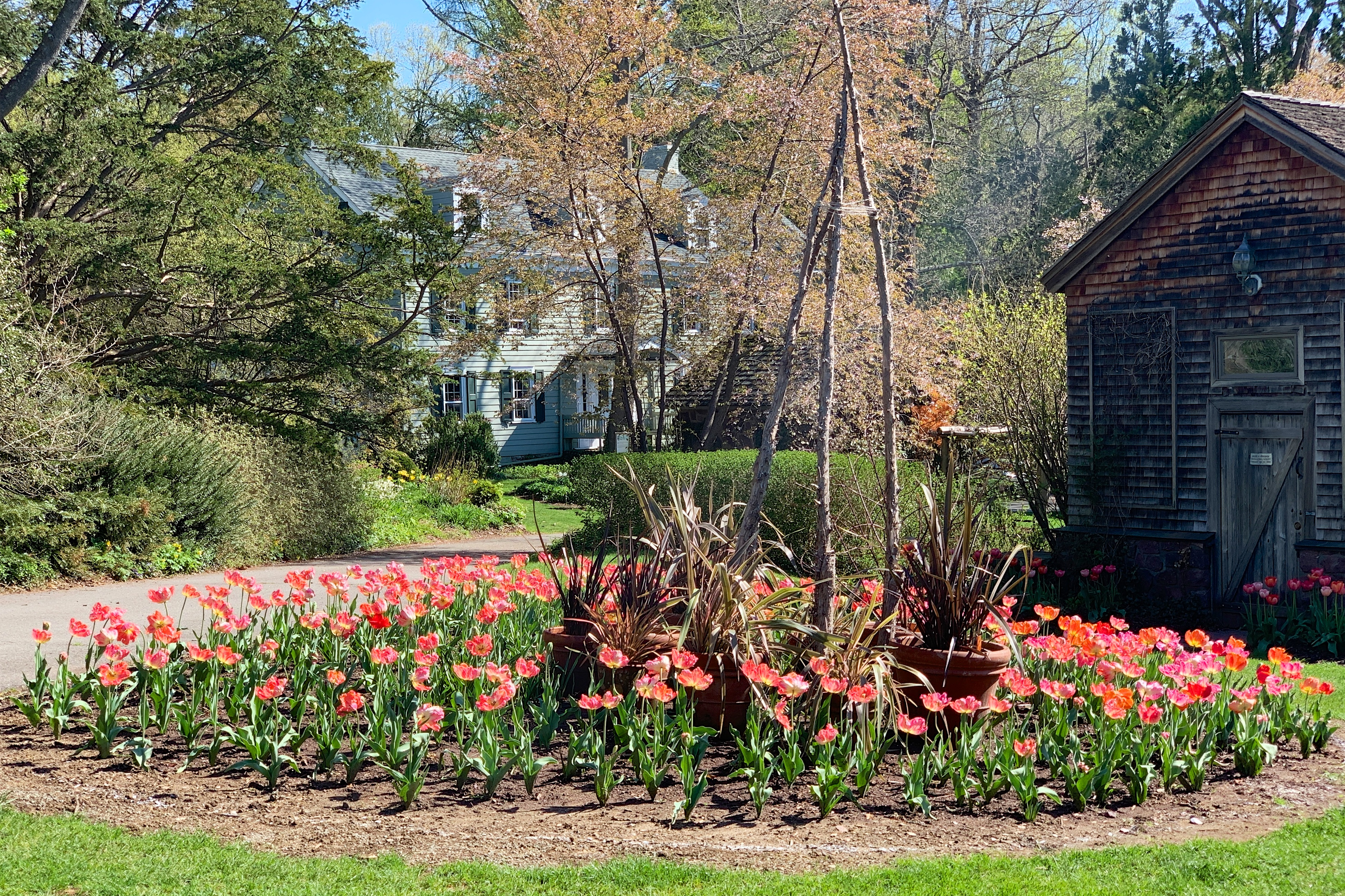
Tulip garden

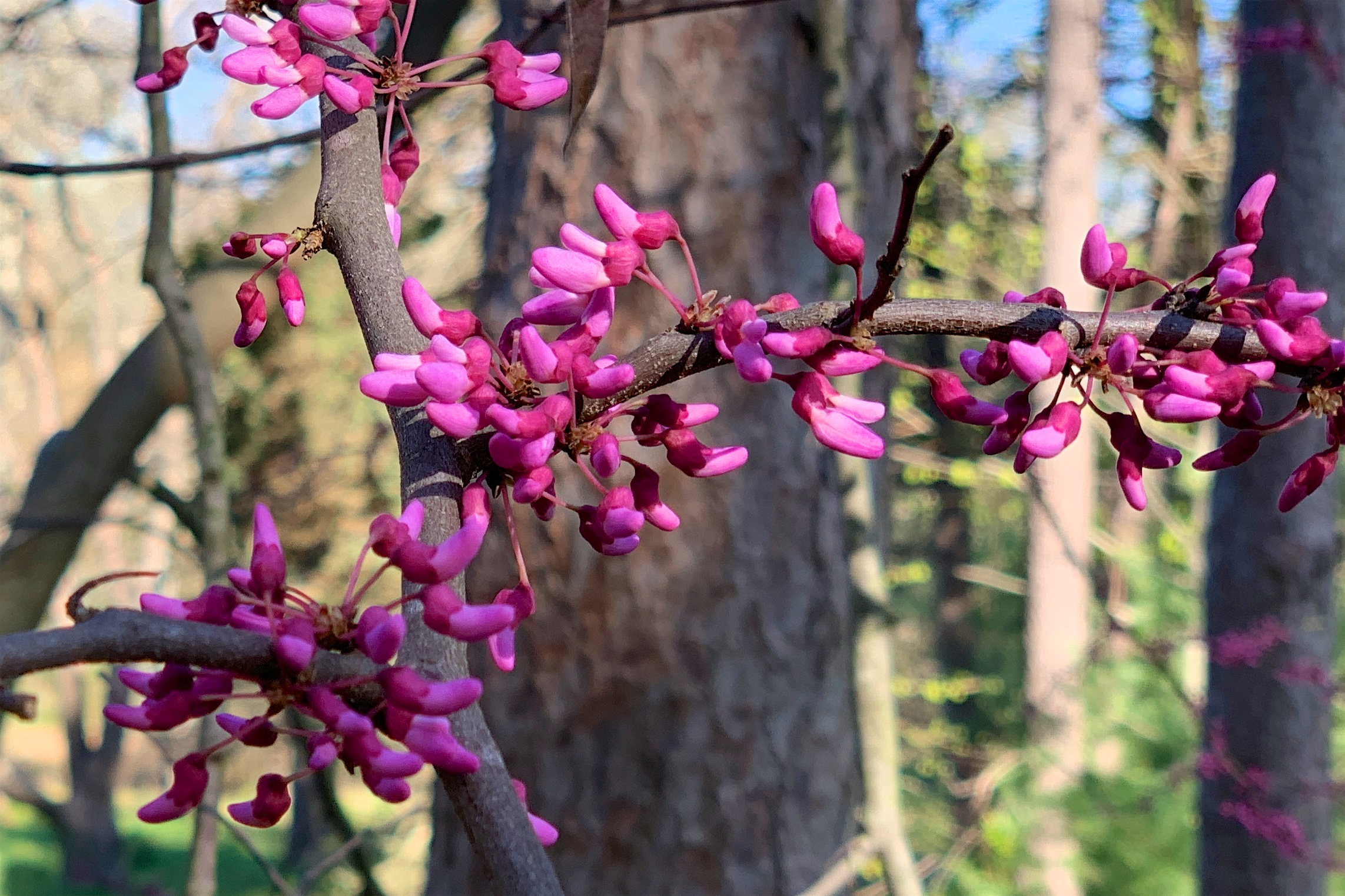
Eastern redbud (Cercis canadensis)

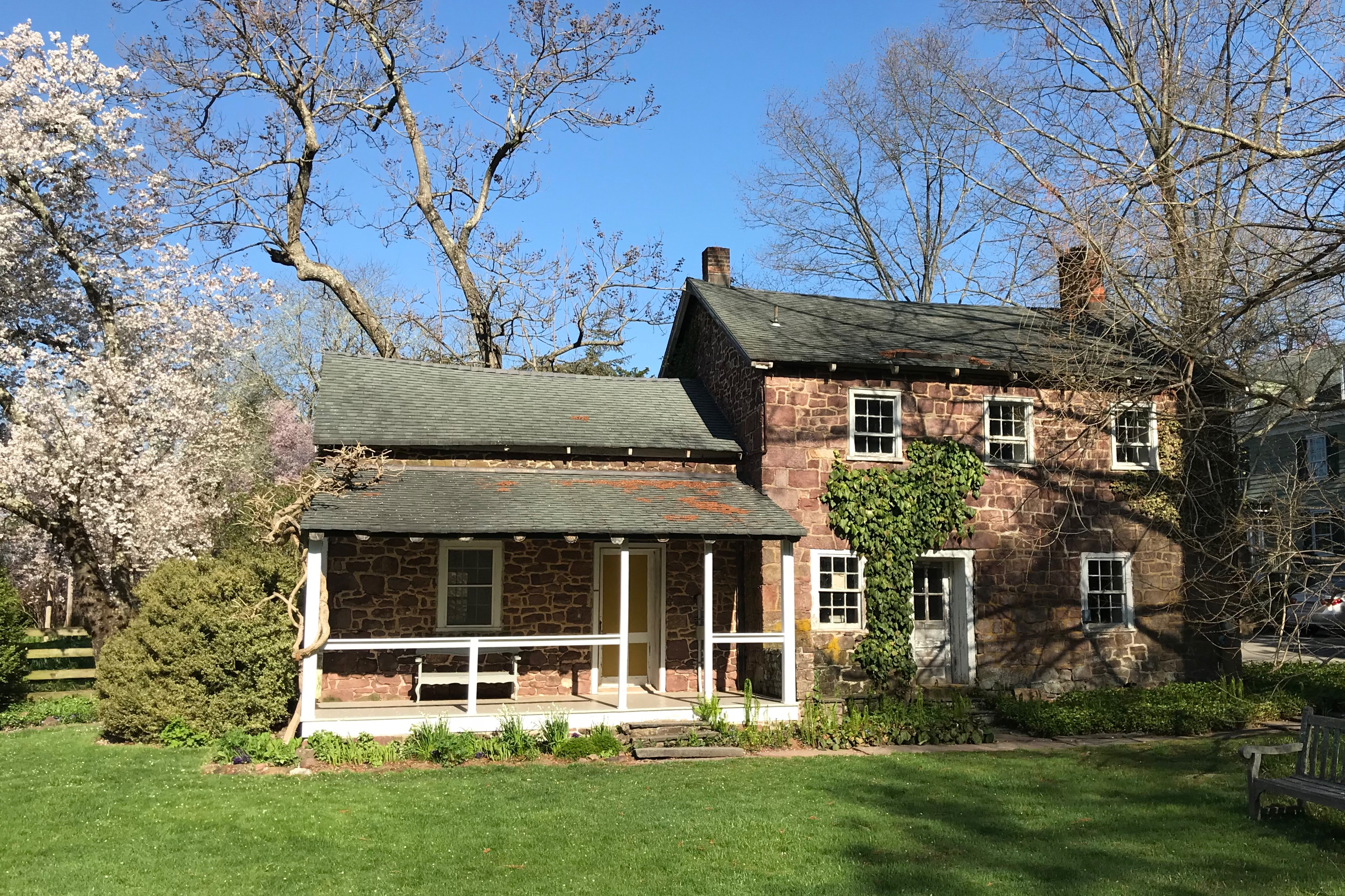
The Stone Cottage

== See also ==
- Bamboo Brook Outdoor Education Center – adjoining park
- List of botanical gardens and arboretums in New Jersey
