= 1942 United States Senate elections =

- November 3, 1942
- Class 2

34 of the 96 seats in the United States Senate 49 seats needed for a majority
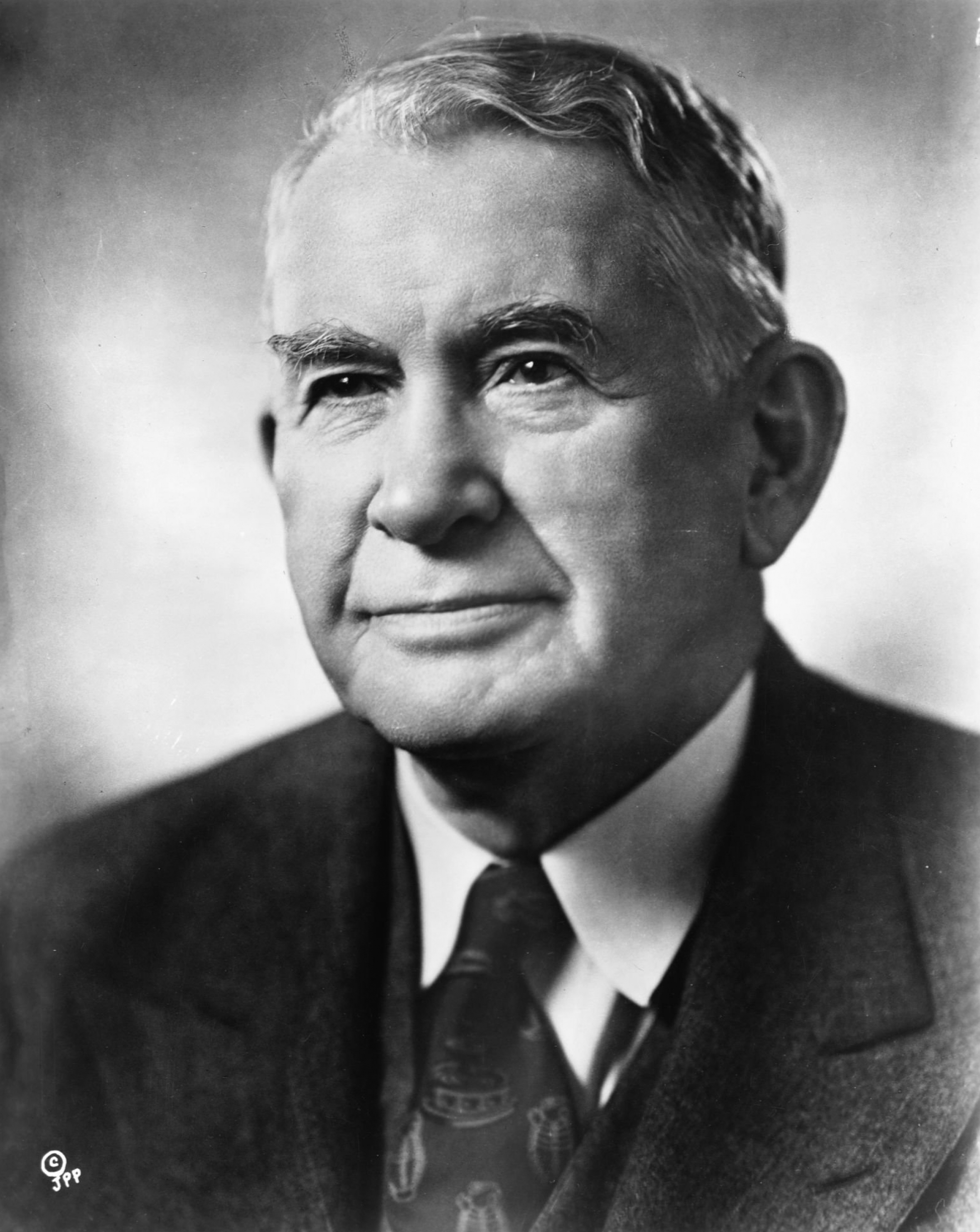

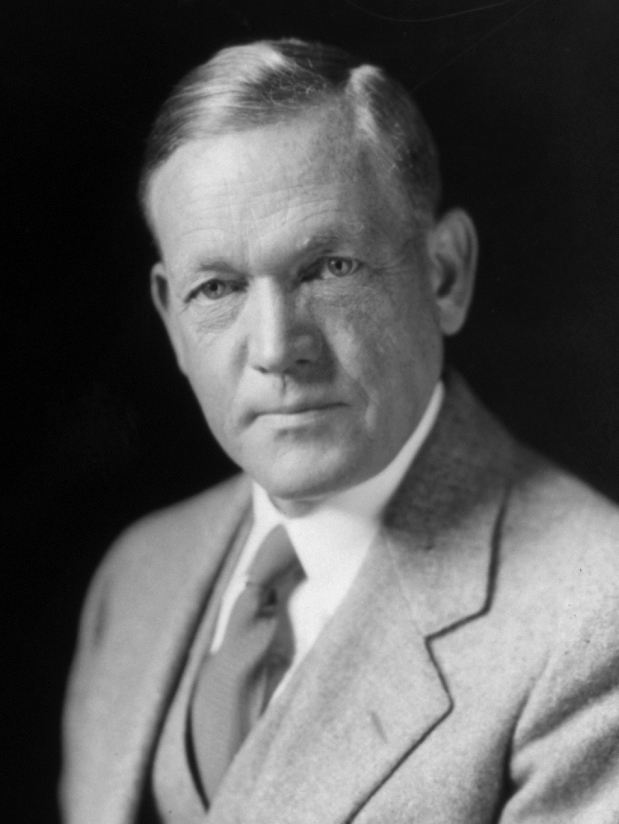
	Majority party	Minority party
Leader	Alben Barkley	Charles McNary
Party	Democratic	Republican
Leader since	July 22, 1937	January 3, 1941
Leader's seat	Kentucky	Oregon
Seats before	65	29
Seats after	57	38
Seat change	▼8	▲9
Popular vote	6,497,048	6,869,448
Percentage	46.6%	49.3%
Seats up	24	9
Races won	16	18
	Third party	Fourth party
Party	Progressive	Independent
Seats before	1	1
Seats after	1	0
Seat change	Steady	▼1
Popular vote	—	236,682
Percentage	—	1.7%
Seats up	0	1
Races won	0	0
- Results of the elections: Democratic hold Republican gain Republican hold No election Rectangular inset (Colorado): both seats up for election
Majority Leader before election
Alben Barkley
Democratic
Elected Majority Leader
Alben Barkley
Democratic

The 1942 United States Senate elections were held November 3, 1942, midway through Franklin D. Roosevelt's third term as president. The 32 seats of Class 2 were contested in regular elections, and two special elections were held to fill vacancies.

Although this election took place during World War II, the opposition Republican party made major gains, taking eight seats from the Democrats and one from an independent. Though the Democrats retained a significant majority, it was the smallest since Roosevelt was first elected in 1932. The Republican gains also erased the Democratic supermajority that they held since 1932. Democrats later gained a seat in New Jersey through an appointment, bringing their seat total up to 58.

The New York Times ascribed the results to "voters' dissatisfaction with the conduct of the war, both at home and abroad" but not evidence of a lack of enthusiasm for the war effort. It found that a candidate's stance as an isolationist or an interventionist before the Attack on Pearl Harbor (December 1941) had little impact on his success at the polls. The paper's editorial board welcomed a return to normal political alignments after the unbalanced majorities of the previous decade. The election not only changed the numbers of Democrats and Republicans in the Senate, but also accomplished an ideological shift, as several longtime enthusiastic supporters of the New Deal were replaced by Republicans of the most conservative sort.

== Results summary ==
↓
57	1	38
Democratic	P	Republican

Colored shading indicates party with largest share of that row.

Parties					Total
Parties	Democratic	Republican	Progressive	Other	Total
Last elections (1940)	66	28	1	1	96
Before these elections	65	29	1	1	96
Not up	41	20	1	0	62
Up	24	9	0	1	34
Class 2 (1936→1942)	23	8	0	1	32
Special: Class 1	1	0	—	—	1
Special: Class 3	0	1	—	—	1
Incumbent retired	1	0	—	—	1
Held by same party	1	0	—	—	1
Replaced by other party	0	0	—	—	0
Result	1	0	0	0	1
Incumbent ran	22	8	—	1	31
Won re-election (Note: Includes Colorado, where the appointee was elected to the remainder of the term.)	13	8	—	0	21
Lost re-election	▼5 Democrats replaced by ▲5 Republicans ▼1 Independent replaced by ▲1 Republican				6
Lost renomination but held by same party	2	0	—	0	2
Lost renomination and party lost	▼2 Democrats replaced by ▲2 Republicans		—	—	2
Result	15	16	0	0	31
Appointee ran for either, but not both, special and regular election	1	1	—	0	2
Appointee's party won both elections	0	1	—	0	1
Appointee's party lost both elections	▼1 Democrat replaced by ▲1 Republican		—	0	1
Result	0	2	0	0	2
Total elected	16	18	0	0	34
Net change	▼8	▲9	Steady	▼1	9
Nationwide vote	6,497,048	6,869,448	—	565,783	13,932,279
Share	46.63%	49.31%	—	4.06%	100%
Result	57	38	1	0	96

== Gains, losses, and holds ==
=== Retirements ===
One Republican retired instead of seeking election to finish the unexpired term and two Democrats retired instead of seeking election to a full term.

State	Senator	Replaced by
Arkansas	Lloyd Spencer	John L. McClellan
Minnesota (special)	Joseph H. Ball	Arthur E. Nelson
West Virginia	Joseph Rosier	Chapman Revercomb

=== Defeats ===
Eight Democrats and one Independent sought re-election but lost in the primary or general election. One Democrat sought election to finish the unexpired term but lost in the primary election and one Democrat sought election to finish the unexpired term but lost in the general election.

State	Senator	Replaced by
Delaware	James H. Hughes	C. Douglass Buck
Iowa	Clyde L. Herring	George A. Wilson
Michigan	Prentiss M. Brown	Homer S. Ferguson
Mississippi	Wall Doxey	James Eastland
Nebraska	George W. Norris	Kenneth S. Wherry
Nevada	Berkeley L. Bunker	James G. Scrugham
New Jersey	William H. Smathers	Albert W. Hawkes
Oklahoma	Joshua B. Lee	Edward H. Moore
South Dakota	William J. Bulow	Harlan J. Bushfield
West Virginia (special)	Joseph Rosier	Hugh Ike Shott
Wyoming	Harry Schwartz	Edward V. Robertson

=== Post election changes ===
State	Senator	Replaced by
New Jersey	William Warren Barbour	Arthur Walsh
Indiana	Frederick Van Nuys	Samuel D. Jackson
Oregon	Charles L. McNary	Guy Cordon
Massachusetts	Henry Cabot Lodge Jr.	Sinclair Weeks

== Change in composition ==
=== Before the elections ===
At the beginning of 1942.

		D_{1}	D_{2}	D_{3}	D_{4}	D_{5}	D_{6}	D_{7}	D_{8}
D_{18}	D_{17}	D_{16}	D_{15}	D_{14}	D_{13}	D_{12}	D_{11}	D_{10}	D_{9}
D_{19}	D_{20}	D_{21}	D_{22}	D_{23}	D_{24}	D_{25}	D_{26}	D_{27}	D_{28}
D_{38}	D_{37}	D_{36}	D_{35}	D_{34}	D_{33}	D_{32}	D_{31}	D_{30}	D_{29}
D_{39}	D_{40}	D_{41}	D_{42} Ala. Ran	D_{43} Ark. Retired	D_{44} Colo. (reg); Ran	D_{45} Del. Ran	D_{46} Ga. Ran	D_{47} Iowa; Ran	D_{48} Ky. Ran
Majority →									D_{49} La. Ran
D_{58} R.I. Ran	D_{57} Okla. Ran	D_{56} N.C. Ran	D_{55} N.M. Ran	D_{54} N.J. Ran	D_{53} Nev. (sp); Ran	D_{52} Mont. Ran	D_{51} Miss. Ran	D_{50} Mich. Ran	D_{49} La. Ran
D_{59} S.C. Ran	D_{60} S.D. Ran	D_{61} Tenn. Ran	D_{62} Texas; Ran	D_{63} Va. Ran	D_{64} W.Va. (sp); Ran; W.Va. (reg); Retired	D_{65} Wyo. Ran	P_{1}	I_{1} Neb. Ran	R_{29} Ore. Ran
R_{19}	R_{20}	R_{21} Colo. (sp); Ran	R_{22} Idaho; Ran	R_{23} Ill. Ran	R_{24} Kan. Ran	R_{25} Maine; Ran	R_{26} Mass. Ran	R_{27} Minn. (sp); Retired; Minn. (reg); Ran	R_{28} N.H. Ran
R_{18}	R_{17}	R_{16}	R_{15}	R_{14}	R_{13}	R_{12}	R_{11}	R_{10}	R_{9}
		R_{1}	R_{2}	R_{3}	R_{4}	R_{5}	R_{6}	R_{7}	R_{8}

=== Election results ===
		D_{1}	D_{2}	D_{3}	D_{4}	D_{5}	D_{6}	D_{7}	D_{8}
D_{18}	D_{17}	D_{16}	D_{15}	D_{14}	D_{13}	D_{12}	D_{11}	D_{10}	D_{9}
D_{19}	D_{20}	D_{21}	D_{22}	D_{23}	D_{24}	D_{25}	D_{26}	D_{27}	D_{28}
D_{38}	D_{37}	D_{36}	D_{35}	D_{34}	D_{33}	D_{32}	D_{31}	D_{30}	D_{29}
D_{39}	D_{40}	D_{41}	D_{42} Ala. Re-elected	D_{43} Ark. Hold	D_{44} Colo. (reg); Re-elected	D_{45} Ga. Re-elected	D_{46} Ky. Re-elected	D_{47} La. Re-elected	D_{48} Miss. Hold
Majority →									D_{49} Mont. Re-elected
P_{1}	D_{57} Va. Re-elected	D_{56} Tenn. Re-elected	D_{55} Texas; Re-elected	D_{54} S.C. Re-elected	D_{53} R.I. Re-elected	D_{52} N.C. Re-elected	D_{51} N.M. Re-elected	D_{50} Nev. (sp); Hold	D_{49} Mont. Re-elected
R_{38} Wyo. Gain	R_{37} W.Va. (sp); Gain (Note: Appointee defeated); W.Va. (reg); Gain	R_{36} S.D. Gain	R_{35} Okla. Gain	R_{34} N.J. Gain	R_{33} Neb. Gain	R_{32} Mich. Gain	R_{31} Iowa; Gain	R_{30} Del. Gain	R_{29} Ore. Re-elected
R_{19}	R_{20}	R_{21} Colo. (sp); Elected (Note: Appointee elected)	R_{22} Idaho; Re-elected	R_{23} Ill. Re-elected	R_{24} Kan. Re-elected	R_{25} Maine; Re-elected	R_{26} Mass. Re-elected	R_{27} Minn. (sp); Hold; Minn. (reg); Elected	R_{28} N.H. Re-elected
R_{18}	R_{17}	R_{16}	R_{15}	R_{14}	R_{13}	R_{12}	R_{11}	R_{10}	R_{9}
		R_{1}	R_{2}	R_{3}	R_{4}	R_{5}	R_{6}	R_{7}	R_{8}

Key:

D_{#}	Democratic
P_{#}	Progressive
R_{#}	Republican
I_{#}	Independent

== Race summaries ==
=== Special elections during the 77th Congress ===
In these special elections, the winner was seated during 1942 or before January 3, 1943; ordered by election date.

State	Incumbent			Results	Candidates
State	Senator	Party	Electoral history	Results	Candidates
Colorado Class 3	Eugene Millikin	Republican	1941 (Appointed)	Interim appointee elected November 3, 1942.	▌ ✓ Eugene Millikin (Republican) 56.1%; ▌James A. Marsh (Democratic) 42.1%
Minnesota Class 2	Joseph H. Ball	Republican	1940 (Appointed)	Interim appointee retired. New senator elected November 3, 1942. Republican hold. Winner did not run for the next term, see below.	▌ ✓ Arthur E. Nelson (Republican) 56.1%; ▌Al Hansen (Farmer–Labor) 26.7%; ▌John E. O'Rourke (Democratic) 17.2%
Nevada Class 1	Berkeley L. Bunker	Democratic	1940 (Appointed)	Appointee lost nomination to finish term. New senator elected November 3, 1942 and qualified December 7, 1942. Democratic hold.	▌ ✓ James G. Scrugham (Democratic) 58.7%; ▌Cecil W. Creel (Republican) 41.3%
West Virginia Class 2	Joseph Rosier	Democratic	1941 (Appointed)	Interim appointee lost election to finish term. New senator elected November 3, 1942 and qualified November 17, 1942. Neither candidate ran in the contemporaneous election for the next term, see below. Republican gain.	▌ ✓ Hugh Ike Shott (Republican) 52.3%; ▌Joseph Rosier (Democratic) 47.7%

=== Races leading to the 78th Congress ===
In these regular elections, the winners were elected for the term beginning January 3, 1943; ordered by state.

All of the elections involved the Class 2 seats.

State	Incumbent			Results	Candidates
State	Senator	Party	Electoral history	Results	Candidates
Alabama	John H. Bankhead II	Democratic	1930; 1936	Incumbent re-elected.	▌ ✓ John H. Bankhead II (Democratic); Unopposed
Arkansas	Lloyd Spencer	Democratic	1941 (Appointed)	Incumbent retired. New senator elected. Democratic hold.	▌ ✓ John L. McClellan (Democratic); Unopposed
Colorado	Edwin C. Johnson	Democratic	1936	Incumbent re-elected.	▌ ✓ Edwin C. Johnson (Democratic) 50.2%; ▌Ralph Lawrence Carr (Republican) 49.2%
Delaware	James H. Hughes	Democratic	1936	Incumbent lost renomination. New senator elected. Republican gain.	▌ ✓ C. Douglass Buck (Republican) 54.2%; ▌E. Ennalls Berl (Democratic) 44.9%
Georgia	Richard Russell Jr.	Democratic	1932 (special); 1936	Incumbent re-elected.	▌ ✓ Richard Russell Jr. (Democratic); Unopposed
Idaho	John Thomas	Republican	1939 (Appointed); 1940 (special)	Incumbent re-elected.	▌ ✓ John Thomas (Republican) 51.5%; ▌Glen H. Taylor (Democratic) 48.5%
Illinois	C. Wayland Brooks	Republican	1940 (special)	Incumbent re-elected.	▌ ✓ C. Wayland Brooks (Republican) 53.2%; ▌Raymond S. McKeough (Democratic) 46.4%
Iowa	Clyde L. Herring	Democratic	1936	Incumbent lost re-election. New senator elected. Republican gain.	▌ ✓ George A. Wilson (Republican) 58.0%; ▌Clyde L. Herring (Democratic) 41.7%
Kansas	Arthur Capper	Republican	1918; 1924; 1930; 1936	Incumbent re-elected.	▌ ✓ Arthur Capper (Republican) 57.1%; ▌George McGill (Democratic) 40.3%
Kentucky	Happy Chandler	Democratic	1939 (Appointed); 1940 (special)	Incumbent re-elected.	▌ ✓ Happy Chandler (Democratic) 55.3%; ▌Richard J. Colbert (Republican) 44.7%
Louisiana	Allen J. Ellender	Democratic	1936	Incumbent re-elected.	▌ ✓ Allen J. Ellender (Democratic); Unopposed
Maine	Wallace H. White	Republican	1930; 1936	Incumbent re-elected.	▌ ✓ Wallace H. White (Republican) 66.7%; ▌Fulton J. Redman (Democratic) 33.3%
Massachusetts	Henry Cabot Lodge Jr.	Republican	1936	Incumbent re-elected.	▌ ✓ Henry Cabot Lodge Jr. (Republican) 52.4%; ▌Joseph E. Casey (Democratic) 46.6%
Michigan	Prentiss M. Brown	Democratic	1936; 1936 (Appointed)	Incumbent lost re-election. New senator elected. Republican gain.	▌ ✓ Homer S. Ferguson (Republican) 49.6%; ▌Prentiss M. Brown (Democratic) 47.2%
Minnesota	Joseph H. Ball	Republican	1940 (Appointed)	Interim appointee elected. Winner did not run to finish the term, see above.	▌ ✓ Joseph H. Ball (Republican) 47.0%; ▌Elmer A. Benson (Farmer–Labor) 28.2%; ▌Martin A. Nelson (Independent) 14.4%; ▌Ed Murphy (Democratic) 10.4%
Mississippi	Wall Doxey	Democratic	1941 (special)	Incumbent lost renomination. New senator elected. Democratic hold.	▌ ✓ James Eastland (Democratic); Unopposed
Montana	James E. Murray	Democratic	1934 (special); 1936	Incumbent re-elected.	▌ ✓ James E. Murray (Democratic) 49.1%; ▌Wellington D. Rankin (Republican) 48.4%
Nebraska	George W. Norris	Independent	1913 (Note: Norris was originally elected as a Republican. For his final term in 1936, he left the Republican Party and was elected as an independent.); 1918; 1924; 1930; 1936	Incumbent lost re-election. New senator elected. Republican gain.	▌ ✓ Kenneth S. Wherry (Republican) 49.0%; ▌George W. Norris (Independent) 28.6%; ▌Foster May (Democratic) 22.0%
New Hampshire	Styles Bridges	Republican	1936	Incumbent re-elected.	▌ ✓ Styles Bridges (Republican) 54.6%; ▌Francis P. Murphy (Democratic) 45.4%
New Jersey	William H. Smathers	Democratic	1936	Incumbent lost re-election. New senator elected. Republican gain.	▌ ✓ Albert W. Hawkes (Republican) 53.1%; ▌William H. Smathers (Democratic) 45.8%
New Mexico	Carl Hatch	Democratic	1933 (Appointed); 1934 (special); 1936	Incumbent re-elected.	▌ ✓ Carl Hatch (Democratic) 59.2%; ▌J. Benson Newell (Republican) 40.8%
North Carolina	Josiah Bailey	Democratic	1936	Incumbent re-elected.	▌ ✓ Josiah Bailey (Democratic) 65.9%; ▌Sam J. Morris (Republican) 34.1%
Oklahoma	Joshua B. Lee	Democratic	1936	Incumbent lost re-election. New senator elected. Republican gain.	▌ ✓ Edward H. Moore (Republican) 54.8%; ▌Joshua B. Lee (Democratic) 44.8%
Oregon	Charles L. McNary	Republican	1917 (Appointed); 1918 (Not elected); 1918 (Appointed); 1918; 1924; 1930; 1936	Incumbent re-elected.	▌ ✓ Charles L. McNary (Republican) 77.1%; ▌Walter W. Whitbeck (Democratic) 22.9%
Rhode Island	Theodore F. Green	Democratic	1936	Incumbent re-elected.	▌ ✓ Theodore F. Green (Democratic) 58.0%; ▌Ira Lloyd Letts (Republican) 42.0%
South Carolina	Burnet R. Maybank	Democratic	1941 (special)	Incumbent re-elected.	▌ ✓ Burnet R. Maybank (Democratic); Unopposed
South Dakota	William J. Bulow	Democratic	1930; 1936	Incumbent lost renomination. New senator elected. Republican gain.	▌ ✓ Harlan J. Bushfield (Republican) 58.7%; ▌Tom Berry (Democratic) 41.3%
Tennessee	Tom Stewart	Democratic	1938 (special)	Incumbent re-elected.	▌ ✓ Tom Stewart (Democratic) 70.5%; ▌F. Todd Meacham (Republican) 21.5%
Texas	W. Lee O'Daniel	Democratic	1941 (special)	Incumbent re-elected.	▌ ✓ W. Lee O'Daniel (Democratic) 94.9%
Virginia	Carter Glass	Democratic	1920 (Appointed); 1920 (special); 1924; 1930; 1936	Incumbent re-elected.	▌ ✓ Carter Glass (Democratic) 91.1%; ▌Lawrence S. Wilkes (Socialist) 6.5%
West Virginia	Joseph Rosier	Democratic	1941 (Appointed)	Interim appointee retired. New senator elected. Republican gain. Winner did not run to finish the term, see above.	▌ ✓ Chapman Revercomb (Republican) 55.4%; ▌Matthew M. Neely (Democratic) 44.6%
Wyoming	Harry Schwartz	Democratic	1936	Incumbent lost re-election. New senator elected. Republican gain.	▌ ✓ Edward V. Robertson (Republican) 54.6%; ▌Harry Schwartz (Democratic) 45.4%

== Closest races ==
Eleven races had a margin of victory under 10%:

State	Party of winner	Margin
Montana	Democratic	0.7%
Colorado	Democratic	1.0%
Michigan	Republican (flip)	2.4%
Idaho	Republican	3.0%
West Virginia (special)	Republican (flip)	4.6%
Massachusetts	Republican	5.8%
Illinois	Republican	6.8%
New Jersey	Republican (flip)	7.3%
Wyoming	Republican (flip)	9.18%
New Hampshire	Republican	9.22%
Delaware	Republican (flip)	9.3%

Texas was the tipping point state with a margin of 90.5%.

== Alabama ==
1942 United States Senate election in Alabama
- November 3, 1942
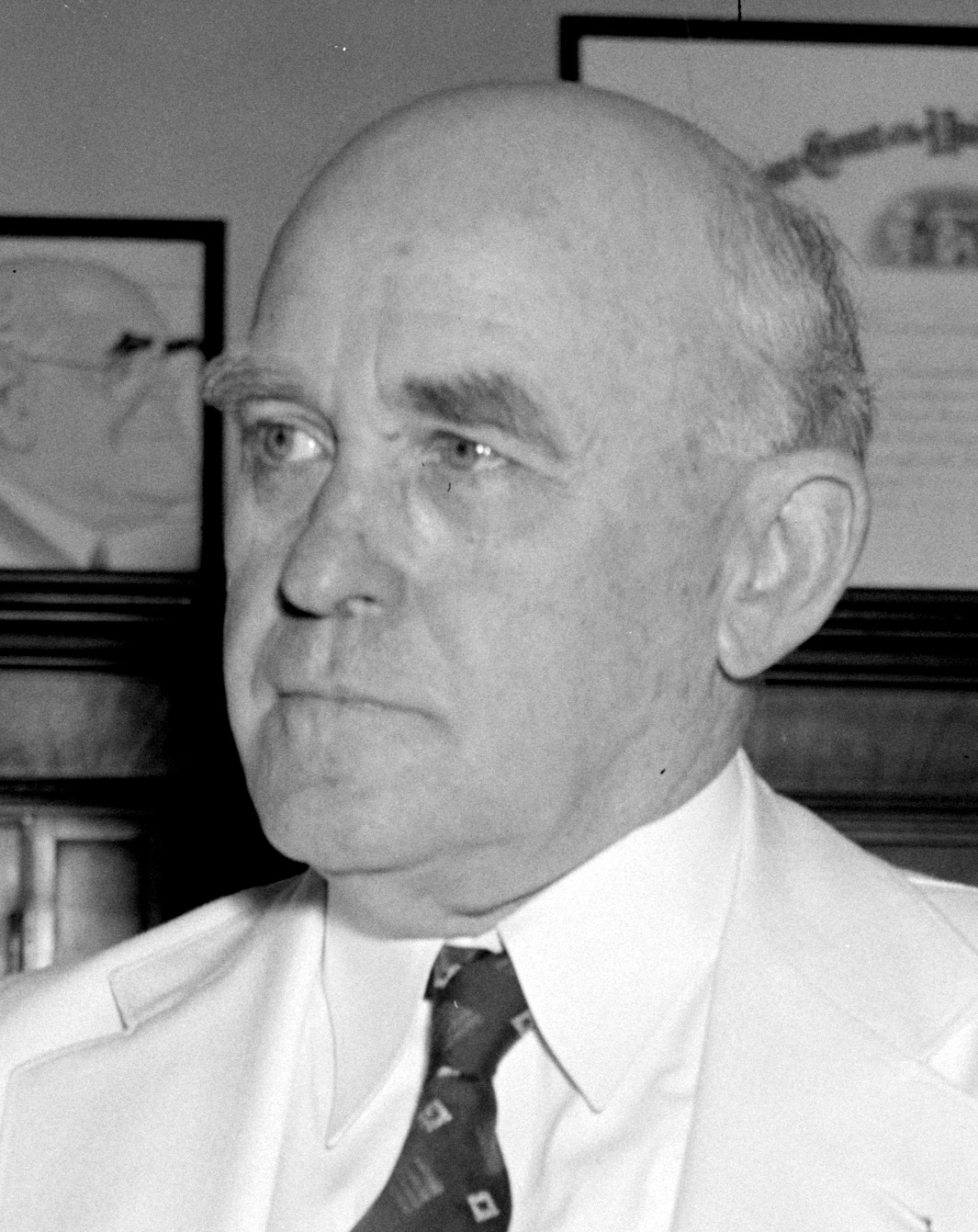
Nominee	John H. Bankhead II
Party	Democratic
Popular vote	69,212
Percentage	100.0%
- County results Bankhead: 100%
U.S. senator before election
John H. Bankhead II
Democratic
Elected U.S. Senator
John H. Bankhead II
Democratic

1942 United States Senate election in Alabama
Party	Candidate	Votes	%
Democratic	John H. Bankhead II (Incumbent)	69,212	100.00%
Democratic hold			

== Arkansas ==
1942 U.S. Senate Democratic primary in Arkansas
- August 11, 1942
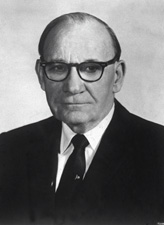

Nominee	John L. McClellan	Jack Holt
Party	Democratic	Democratic
Popular vote	134,277	83,516
Percentage	61.65%	31.35%
U.S. senator before election
Lloyd Spencer
Democratic
Elected U.S. Senator
John L. McClellan
Democratic

1942 United States Senate election in Arkansas
Party	Candidate	Votes	%
Democratic	John L. McClellan	99,124	100.00%
Democratic hold			

== Colorado ==
There were 2 elections in Colorado.

=== Colorado (regular) ===
1942 United States Senate election in Colorado
- November 3, 1942
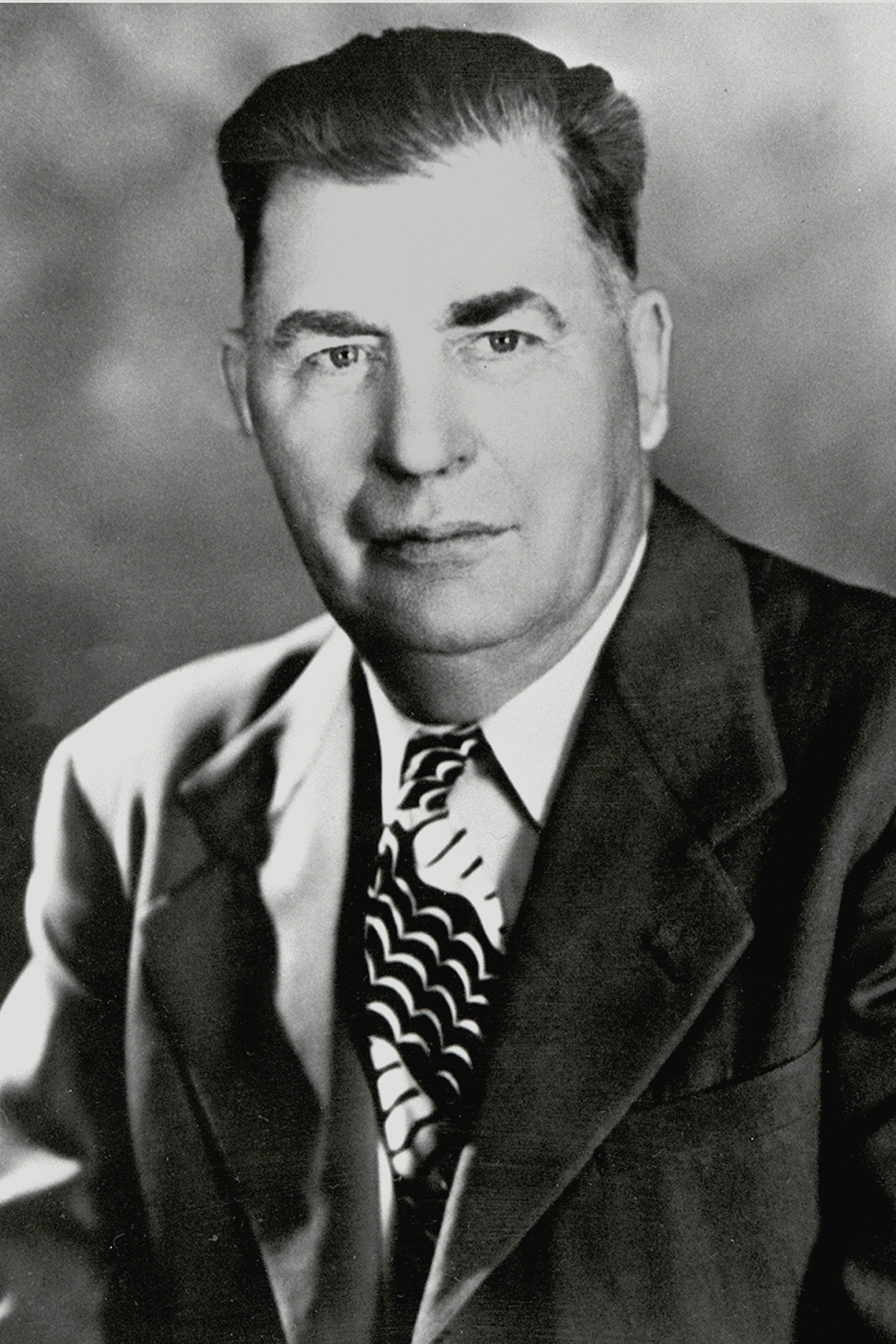

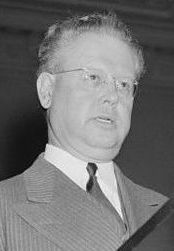
Nominee	Ed Johnson	Ralph L. Carr
Party	Democratic	Republican
Popular vote	174,612	170,970
Percentage	50.23%	49.19%
- Results by county Johnson: 40–50% 50–60% 60–70% Carr: 50–60% 60–70%
U.S. senator before election
Edwin C. Johnson
Democratic
Elected U.S. Senator
Edwin C. Johnson
Democratic

Colorado regular election (Class 2)
Party	Candidate	Votes	%
Democratic	Edwin C. Johnson (Incumbent)	174,612	50.23%
Republican	Ralph Lawrence Carr	170,970	49.19%
Socialist	Carle Whithead	1,387	0.40%
Communist	James Allander	627	0.18%
Majority		3,642	1.04%
Turnout		347,596	
Democratic hold			

=== Colorado (special) ===
1942 United States Senate special election in Colorado
- November 3, 1942
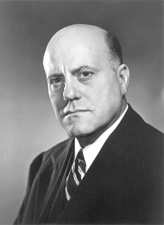
Nominee	Eugene Millikin	James A. Marsh
Party	Republican	Democratic
Popular vote	191,517	143,817
Percentage	56.12%	42.14%
- Results by county Millikin: 40–50% 50–60% 60–70% 70–80% Marsh: 40–50% 50–60%
U.S. senator before election
Eugene Millikin
Republican
Elected U.S. Senator
Eugene Millikin
Republican

Colorado special election (Class 3)
Party	Candidate	Votes	%
Republican	Eugene Millikin (Incumbent)	191,517	56.12%
Democratic	James A. Marsh	143,817	42.14%
Independent	Lewis Haley Tiley	4,262	1.25%
Socialist	Edgar P. Sherman	1,664	0.49%
Majority		48,700	13.98%
Turnout		341,260	
Republican hold			

== Delaware ==
1942 United States Senate election in Delaware
- November 3, 1942
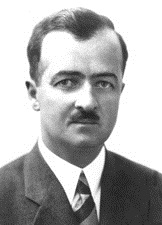

Nominee	C. Douglass Buck	E. Ennalls Berl
Party	Republican	Democratic
Popular vote	46,210	38,322
Percentage	54.17%	44.92%
- County results Buck: 50–60%
U.S. senator before election
James H. Hughes
Democratic
Elected U.S. Senator
C. Douglass Buck
Republican

1942 United States Senate election in Delaware
Party	Candidate	Votes	%
Republican	C. Douglass Buck	46,210	54.17%
Democratic	E. Ennalls Berl	38,322	44.92%
Prohibition	Thomas J. Sard	776	0.91%
Majority		7,888	9.25%
Turnout		85,308	
Republican gain from Democratic			

== Georgia ==
1942 U.S. Senate Democratic primary in Georgia
- September 9, 1942
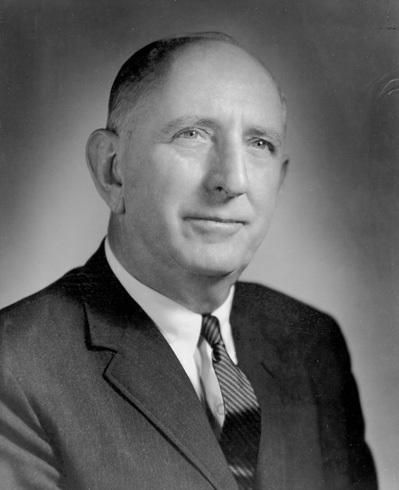

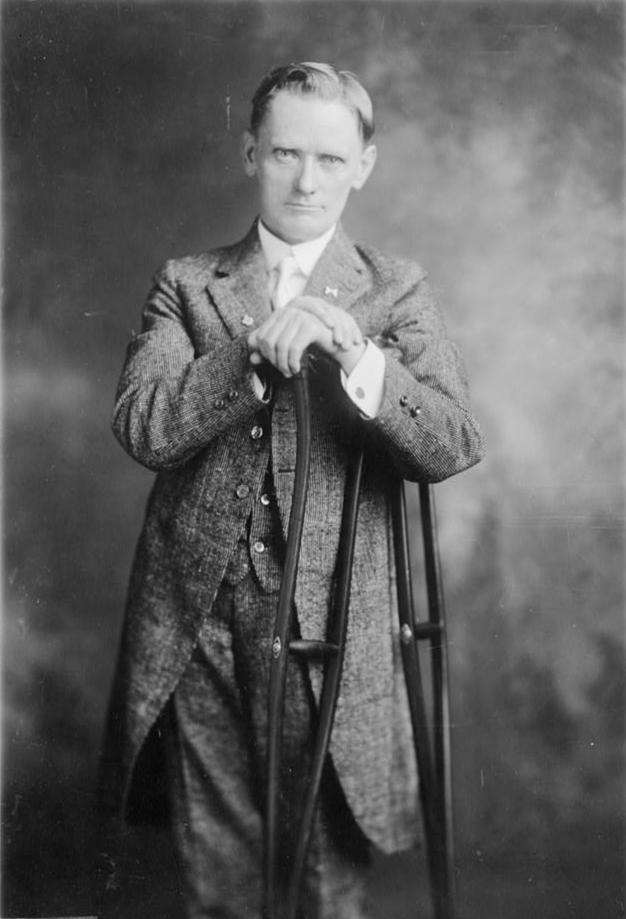
Nominee	Richard Russell Jr.	William D. Upshaw
Party	Democratic	Democratic
Electoral vote	410	0
Popular vote	232,084	55,845
Percentage	80.60%	19.40%
- County results Russell: 60–70% 70–80% 80–90% >90%
U.S. senator before election
Richard Russell Jr.
Democratic
Elected U.S. Senator
Richard Russell Jr.
Democratic

1942 United States Senate election in Georgia
Party	Candidate	Votes	%
Democratic	Richard Russell Jr. (Incumbent)	59,870	96.94%
Independent	LeVert Dwyer Shivers	1,892	3.06%
Majority		57,978	93.88%
Turnout		61,762	
Democratic hold			

== Idaho ==
1942 United States Senate election in Idaho
- November 3, 1942
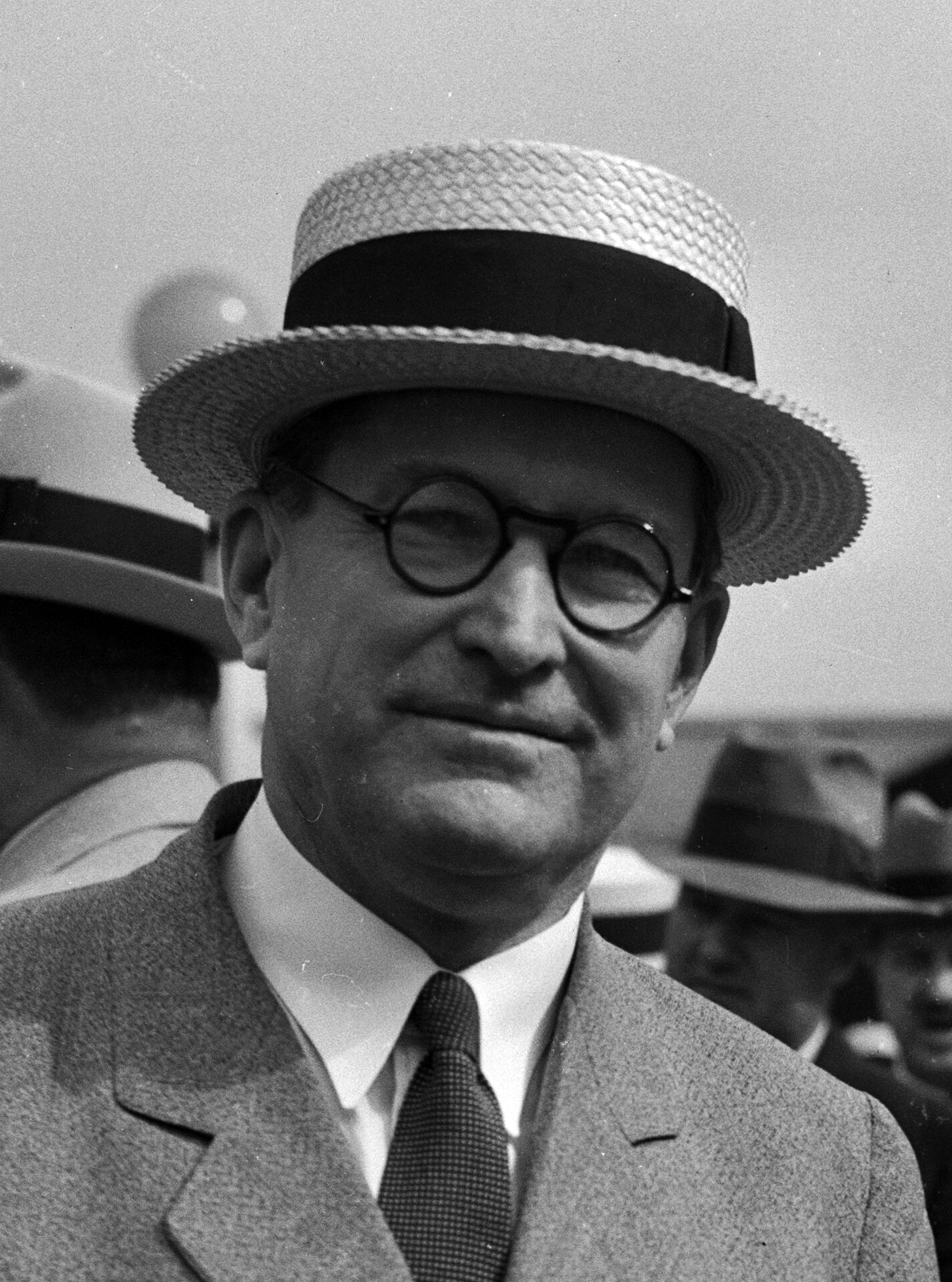

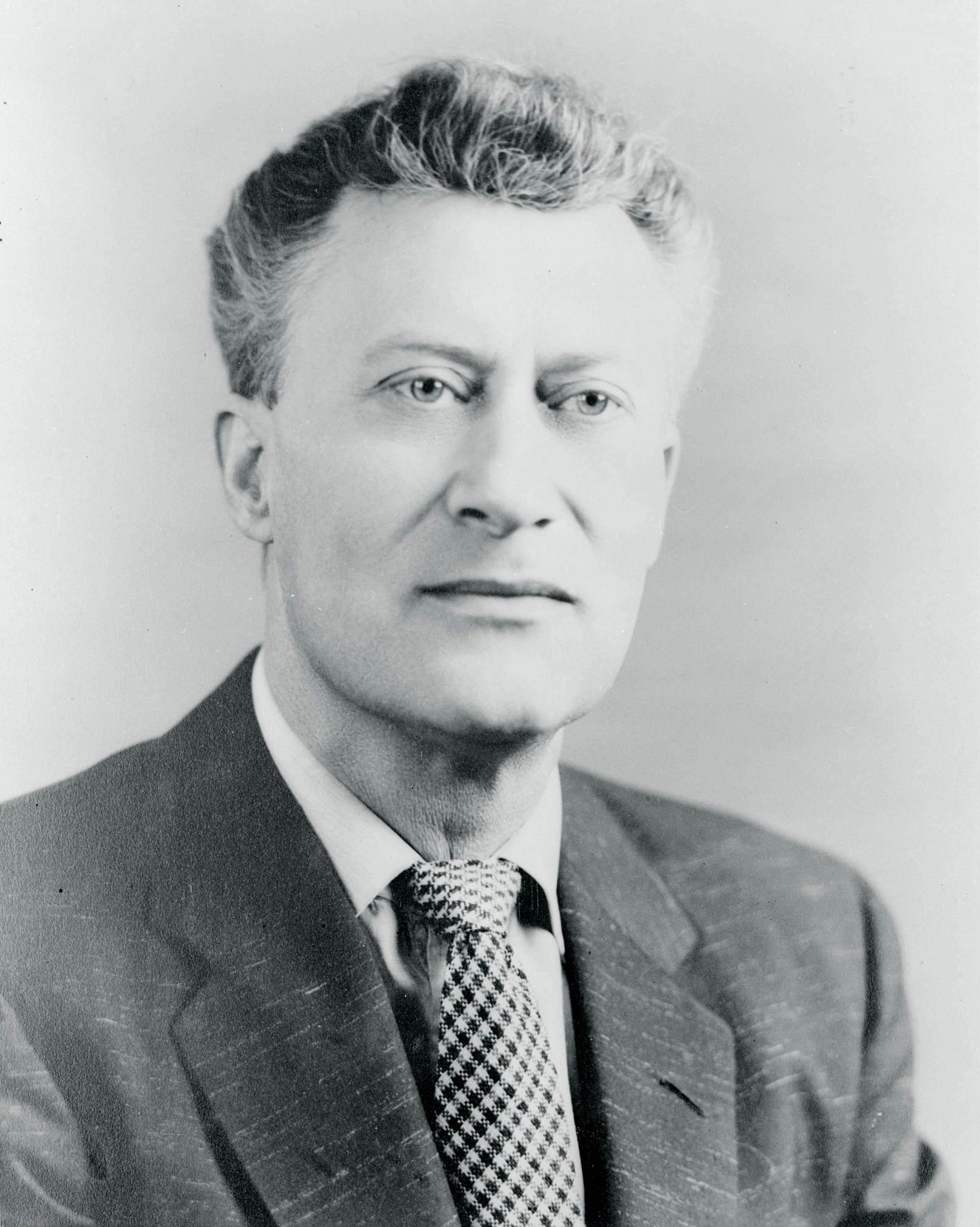
Nominee	John Thomas	Glen H. Taylor
Party	Republican	Democratic
Popular vote	73,353	68,989
Percentage	51.53%	48.47%
- County results Thomas: 50–60% 60–70% Taylor: 50–60% 60–70%
U.S. senator before election
John Thomas
Republican
Elected U.S. Senator
John Thomas
Republican

1942 United States Senate election in Idaho
Party	Candidate	Votes	%
Republican	John Thomas (Incumbent)	73,353	51.53%
Democratic	Glen H. Taylor	68,989	48.47%
Majority			
Turnout			
Republican hold			

== Illinois ==
1942 United States Senate election in Illinois
- November 3, 1942
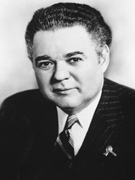

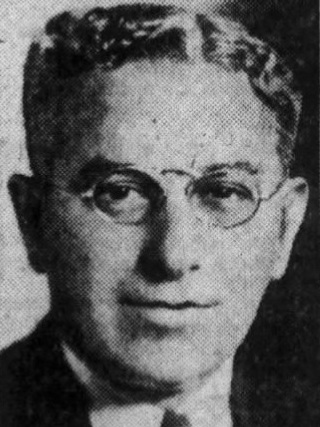
Nominee	Charles W. Brooks	Raymond S. McKeough
Party	Republican	Democratic
Popular vote	1,582,887	1,380,011
Percentage	53.24%	46.41%
- Results by county Brooks: 50–60% 60–70% 70–80% 80–90% McKeough: 50–60%
U.S. senator before election
Charles W. Brooks
Republican
Elected U.S. senator
Charles W. Brooks
Republican

Illinois election
Party	Candidate	Votes	%
Republican	Charles W. Brooks (Incumbent)	1,582,887	53.24%
Democratic	Raymond S. McKeough	1,380,011	46.41%
Prohibition	Enoch A. Holtwick	10,331	0.35%
Write-in	Others	32	0.00%
Majority		202,876	6.83%
Turnout		2,973,261	
Republican hold			

== Iowa ==
1942 United States Senate election in Iowa
- November 3, 1942
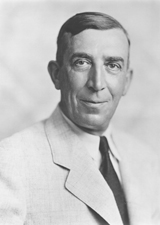

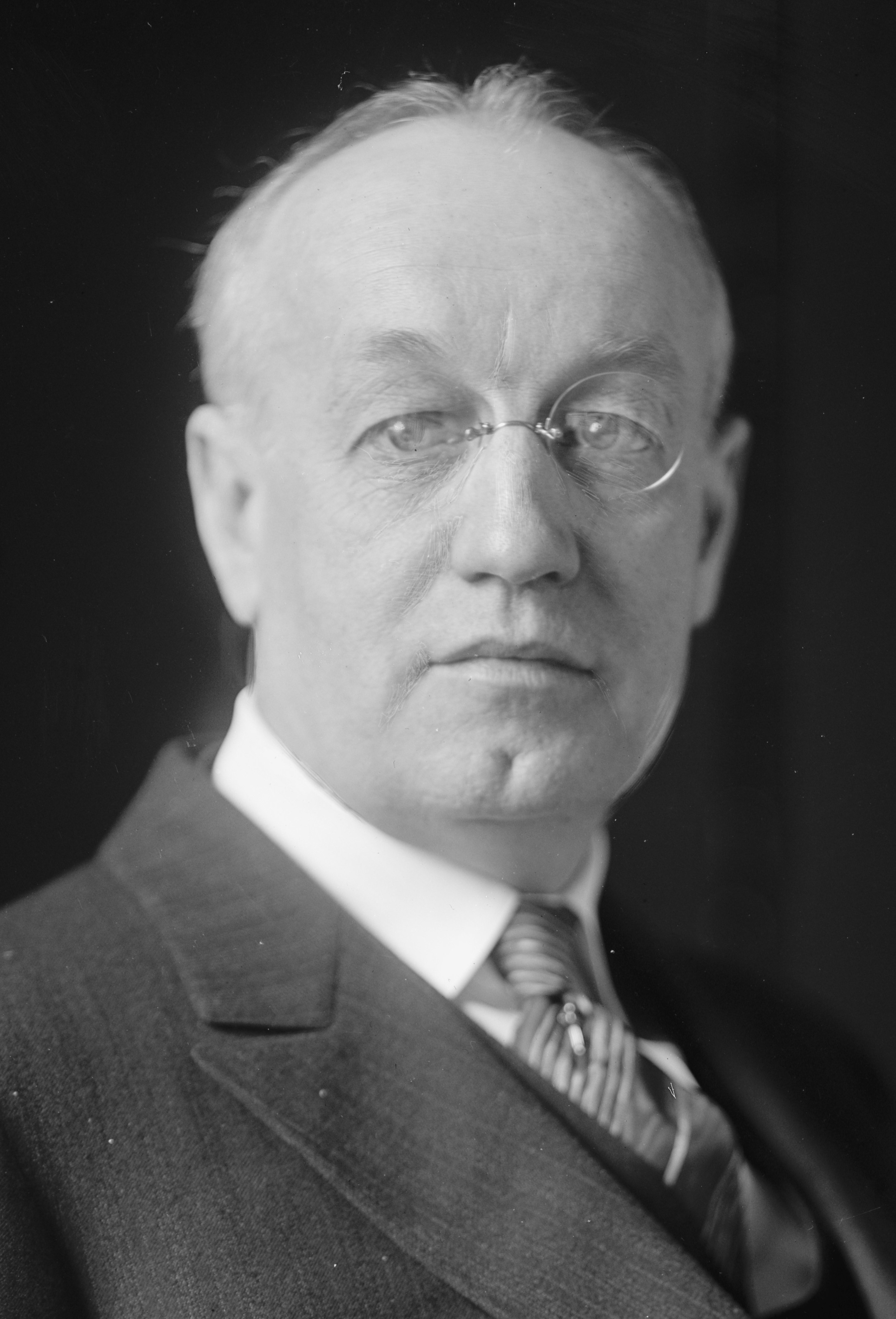
Nominee	George A. Wilson	Clyde Herring
Party	Republican	Democratic
Popular vote	410,383	295,194
Percentage	57.98%	41.70%
- County results Wilson: 50–60% 60–70% 70–80% Herring: 50–60%
U.S. senator before election
Clyde Herring
Democratic
Elected U.S. Senator
George A. Wilson
Republican

1942 United States Senate election in Iowa
Party	Candidate	Votes	%
Republican	George A. Wilson	410,383	57.97%
Democratic	Clyde L. Herring (Incumbent)	295,194	41.70%
Prohibition	M. M. Heptonstall	1,461	0.21%
Independent Progressive	Ernest J. Seeman	821	0.12%
None	Scattering	4	0.00%
Majority		115,189	16.27%
Turnout		707,863	
Republican gain from Democratic			

== Kansas ==
1942 United States Senate election in Kansas
- November 3, 1942
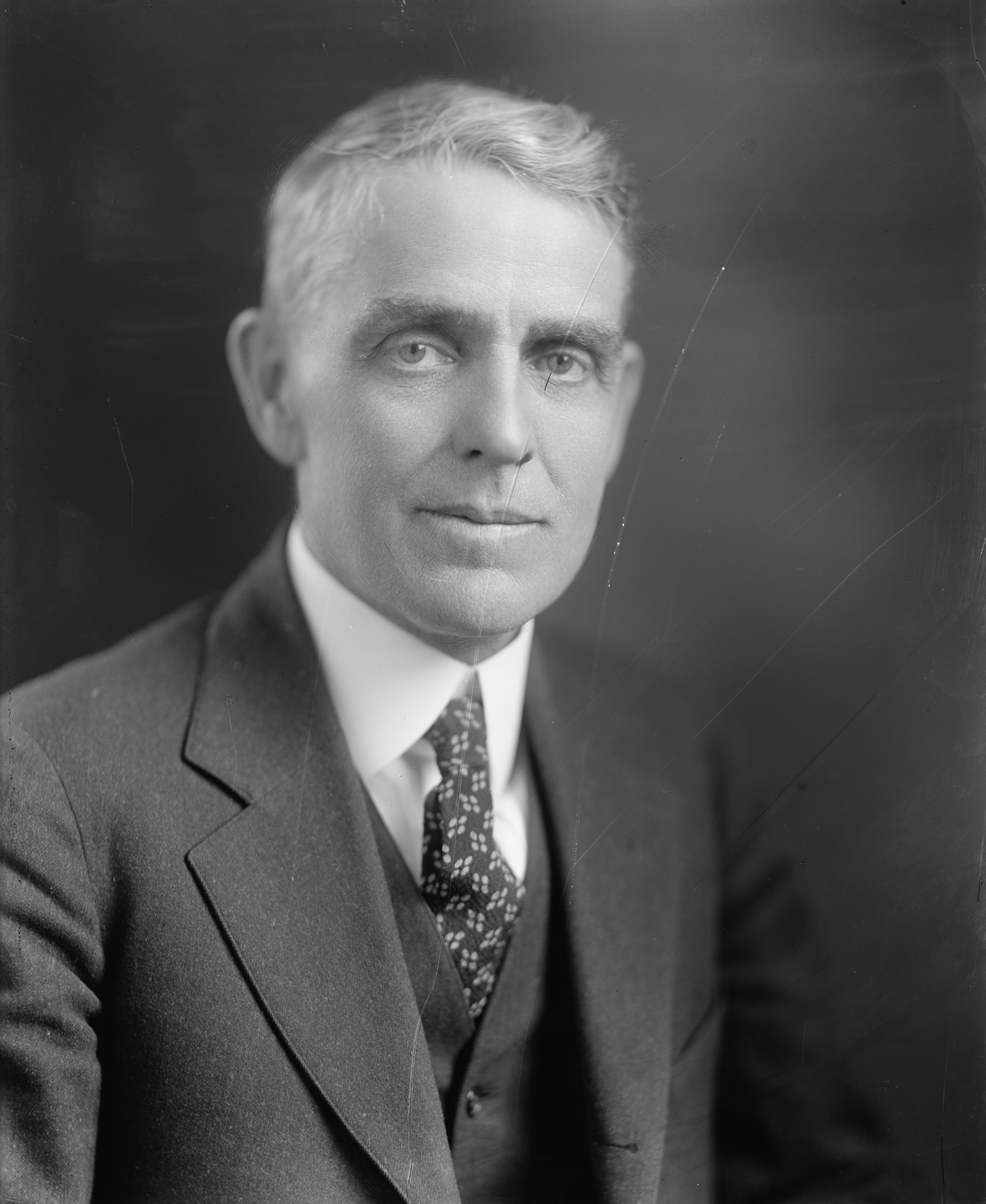

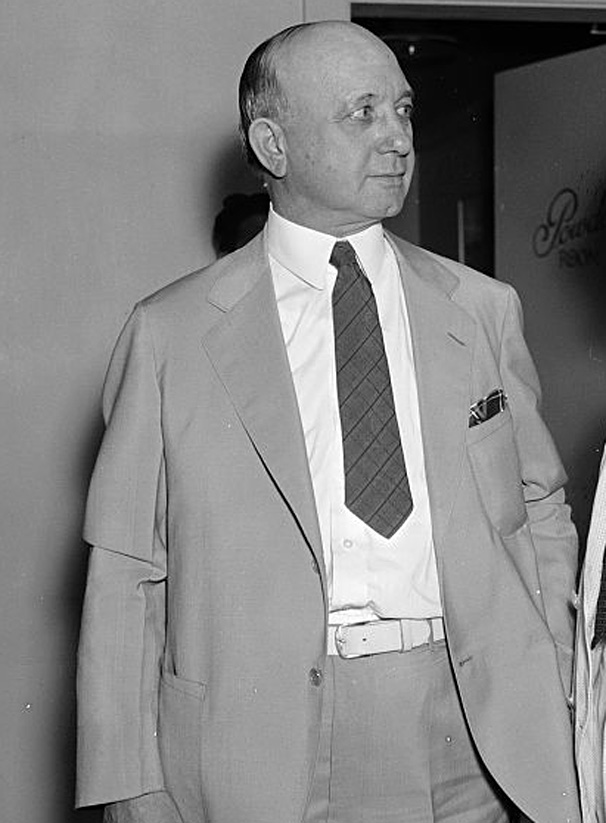
Nominee	Arthur Capper	George McGill
Party	Republican	Democratic
Popular vote	284,059	200,437
Percentage	57.11%	40.30%
- County results Capper: 40–50% 50–60% 60–70% 70–80% McGill: 40–50% 50–60%
U.S. senator before election
Arthur Capper
Republican
Elected U.S. Senator
Arthur Capper
Republican

1942 United States Senate election in Kansas
Party	Candidate	Votes	%
Republican	Arthur Capper (Incumbent)	284,059	57.11%
Democratic	George McGill	200,437	40.30%
Prohibition	C. Floyd Hester	12,863	2.59%
Majority		83,622	16.81%
Turnout		497,359	
Republican hold			

== Kentucky ==
1942 United States Senate election in Kentucky
- November 3, 1942
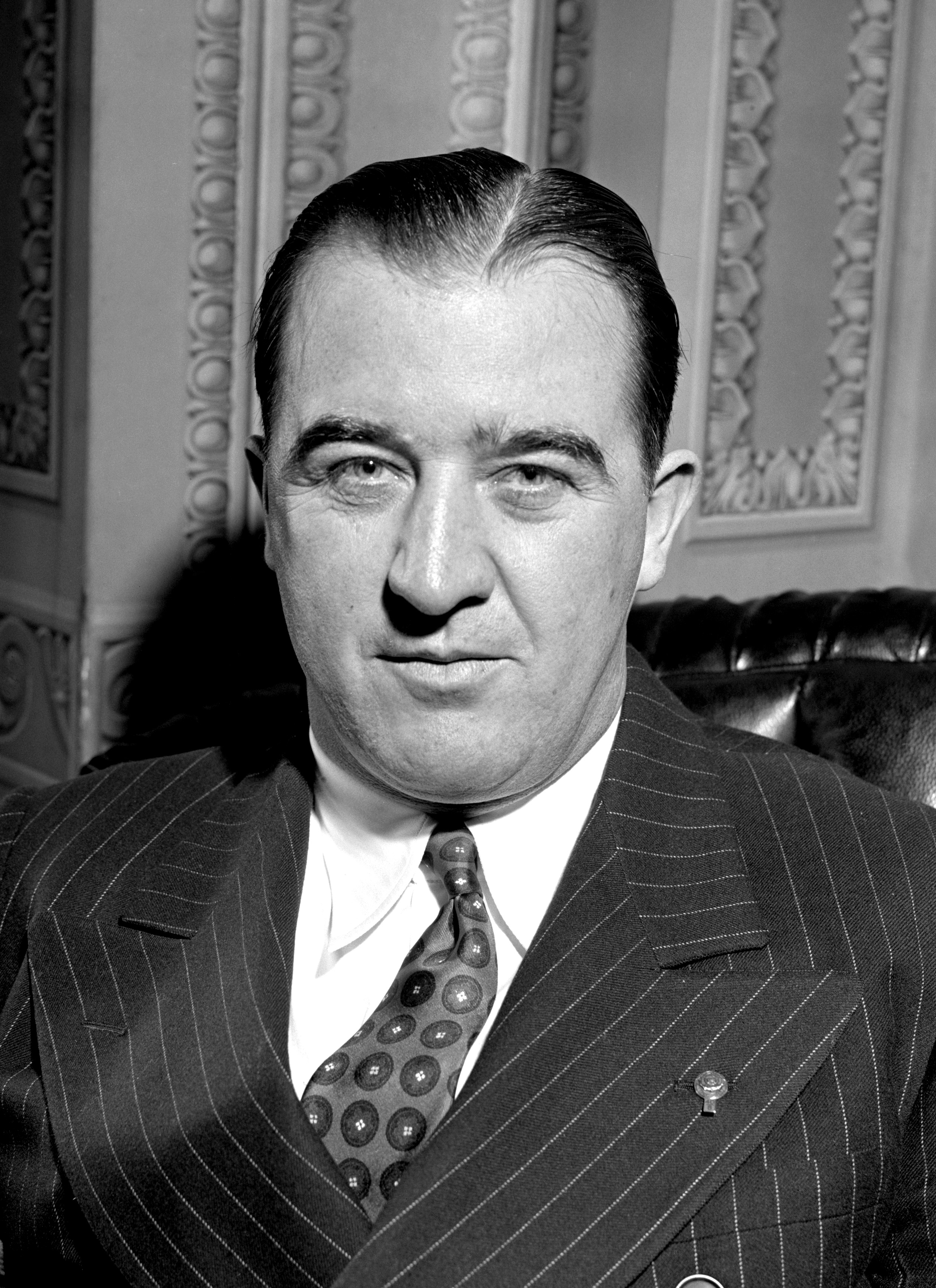

Nominee	Happy Chandler	Richard J. Colbert
Party	Democratic	Republican
Popular vote	216,958	175,081
Percentage	55.34%	44.66%
- County results Chandler: 50–60% 60–70% 70–80% 80–90% Colbert: 50–60% 60–70% 70–80% 80–90%
U.S. senator before election
Happy Chandler
Democratic
Elected U.S. Senator
Happy Chandler
Democratic

1942 United States Senate election in Kentucky
Party	Candidate	Votes	%
Democratic	Happy Chandler (Incumbent)	216,958	55.34%
Republican	Richard J. Colbert	175,081	44.66%
Majority		41,877	10.68%
Turnout		392,023	
Democratic hold			

== Louisiana ==
1942 United States Senate election in Louisiana
Party	Candidate	Votes	%
Democratic	Allen J. Ellender (Incumbent)	85,488	100.00%
Democratic hold			

== Maine ==
1942 United States Senate election in Maine
- September 14, 1942
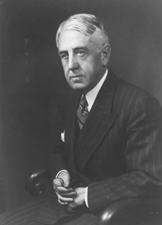
Nominee	Wallace White	Fulton J. Redman
Party	Republican	Democratic
Popular vote	111,520	55,754
Percentage	66.67%	33.33%
- County results White: 50–60% 60–70% 70–80%
U.S. senator before election
Wallace H. White Jr.
Republican
Elected U.S. Senator
Wallace H. White Jr.
Republican

1942 United States Senate election in Maine
Party	Candidate	Votes	%
Republican	Wallace H. White Jr. (Incumbent)	111,520	66.67%
Democratic	Fulton J. Redman	55,754	33.33%
Majority		65,766	33.34%
Turnout		167,274	
Republican hold			

== Massachusetts ==
1942 United States Senate election in Massachusetts
- November 3, 1942
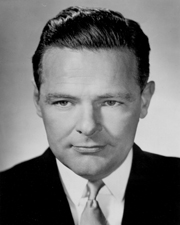

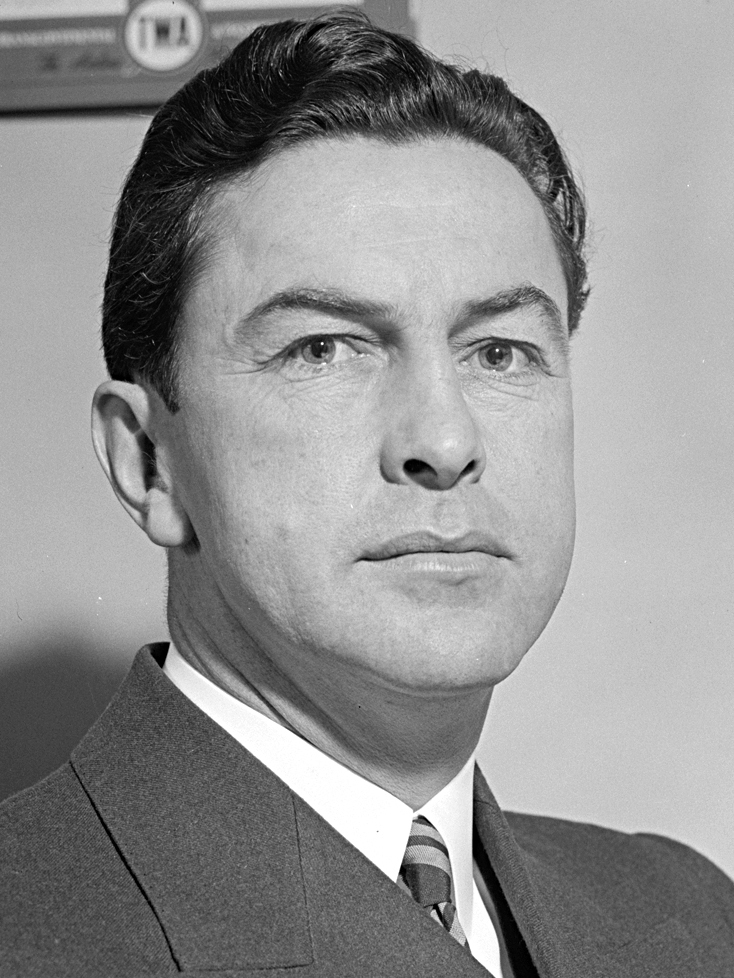
Nominee	Henry Cabot Lodge Jr.	Joseph E. Casey
Party	Republican	Democratic
Popular vote	721,239	641,042
Percentage	52.44%	46.61%
- Lodge: 40–50% 50–60% 60–70% 70–80% 80–90% 90–100% Casey: 40–50% 50–60% 60–70% 70–80%
Senator before election
Henry Cabot Lodge Jr.
Republican
Elected Senator
Henry Cabot Lodge Jr.
Republican

General election
Party	Candidate	Votes	%	±%
Republican	Henry Cabot Lodge Jr. (Incumbent)	721,239	52.44%	+3.91%
Democratic	Joseph E. Casey	641,042	46.61%	+5.62%
Socialist	George Lyman Paine	4,802	0.35%	−0.19%
Socialist Labor	Horace I. Hillis	4,781	0.35%	+0.35%
Prohibition	George L. Thompson	3,577	0.26%	+0.26%
Majority		80,197	5.83%	
Turnout		1,375,441		
Republican hold		Swing		

== Michigan ==
1942 United States Senate election in Michigan
- November 2, 1942
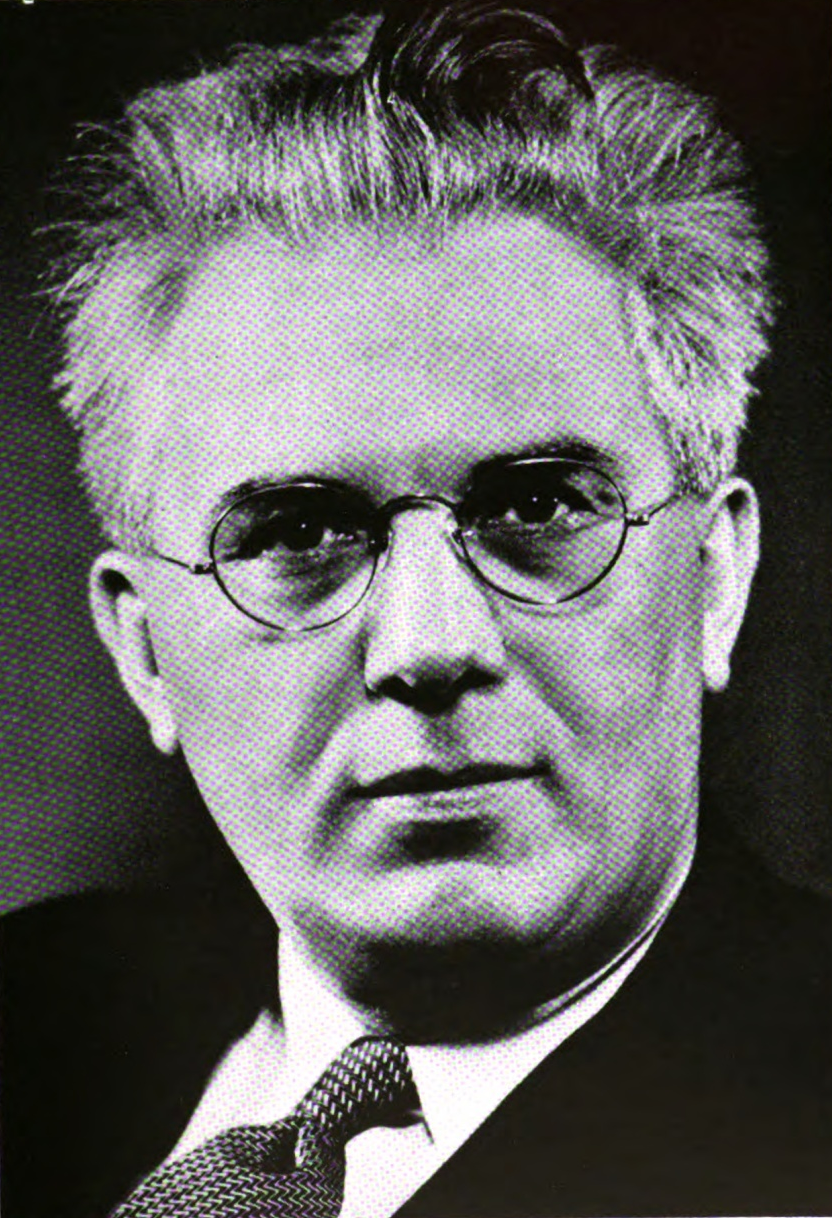

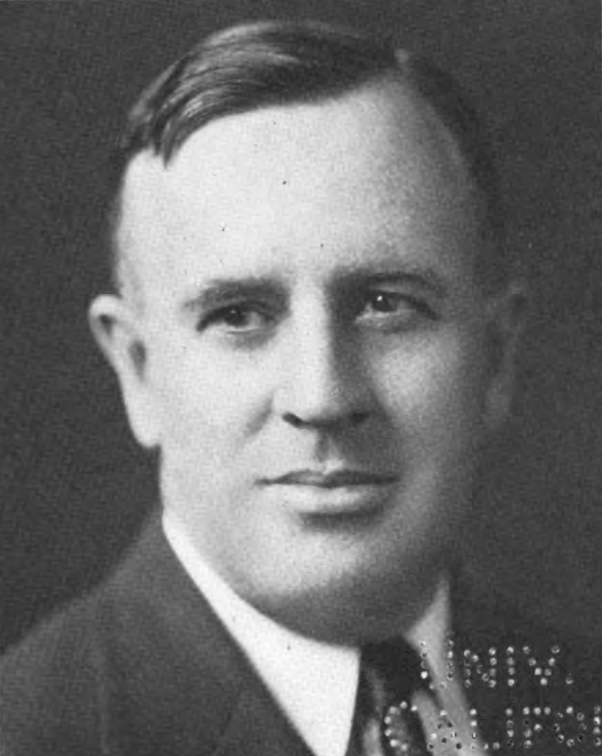
Nominee	Homer S. Ferguson	Prentiss M. Brown
Party	Republican	Democratic
Popular vote	589,652	561,595
Percentage	49.55%	47.20%
- County results Ferguson: 40–50% 50–60% 60–70% 70–80% Brown: 40–50% 50–60% 60–70%
U.S. senator before election
Prentiss M. Brown
Democratic
Elected U.S. Senator
Homer S. Ferguson
Republican

1942 United States Senate election in Michigan
Party	Candidate	Votes	%
Republican	Homer S. Ferguson	589,652	49.55%
Democratic	Prentiss M. Brown (Incumbent)	561,595	47.19%
Republican	Gerald L. K. Smith (sticker)	32,173	2.70%
Prohibition	Leroy M. Powell	6,526	0.55%
None	Scattering	20	0.00%
Majority		28,057	2.36%
Turnout		1,189,966	
Republican gain from Democratic			

== Minnesota ==
There were two elections to the same seat due to the August 31, 1940 death of Farmer–Laborite Ernest Lundeen. Republican Joseph H. Ball was appointed October 14, 1940 to continue the term, pending the special election. Ball was elected to the next term in the regular election, but not to finish the current term in the special election.

=== Minnesota (special) ===
1942 United States Senate special election in Minnesota
- November 3, 1942
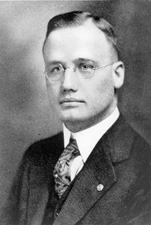

Nominee	Arthur E. Nelson	Al Hansen	John E. O'Rourke
Party	Republican	Farmer–Labor	Democratic
Popular vote	372,240	177,008	114,086
Percentage	56.12%	26.68%	17.20%
- County results Nelson: 40–50% 50–60% 60–70% 70–80% Hansen: 40–50% 60–70%
U.S. senator before election
Joseph H. Ball
Republican
Elected U.S. senator
Arthur E. Nelson
Republican

Minnesota special election
Party	Candidate	Votes	%
Republican	Arthur E. Nelson	372,240	56.12%
Farmer–Labor	Al Hansen	177,008	26.68%
Democratic	John E. O’Rourke	114,086	17.20%
Majority		195,232	29.44%
Turnout		663,334	
Republican hold			

=== Minnesota (regular) ===
1942 United States Senate election in Minnesota
- November 3, 1942
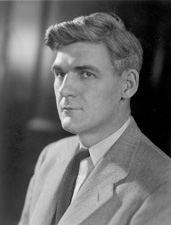

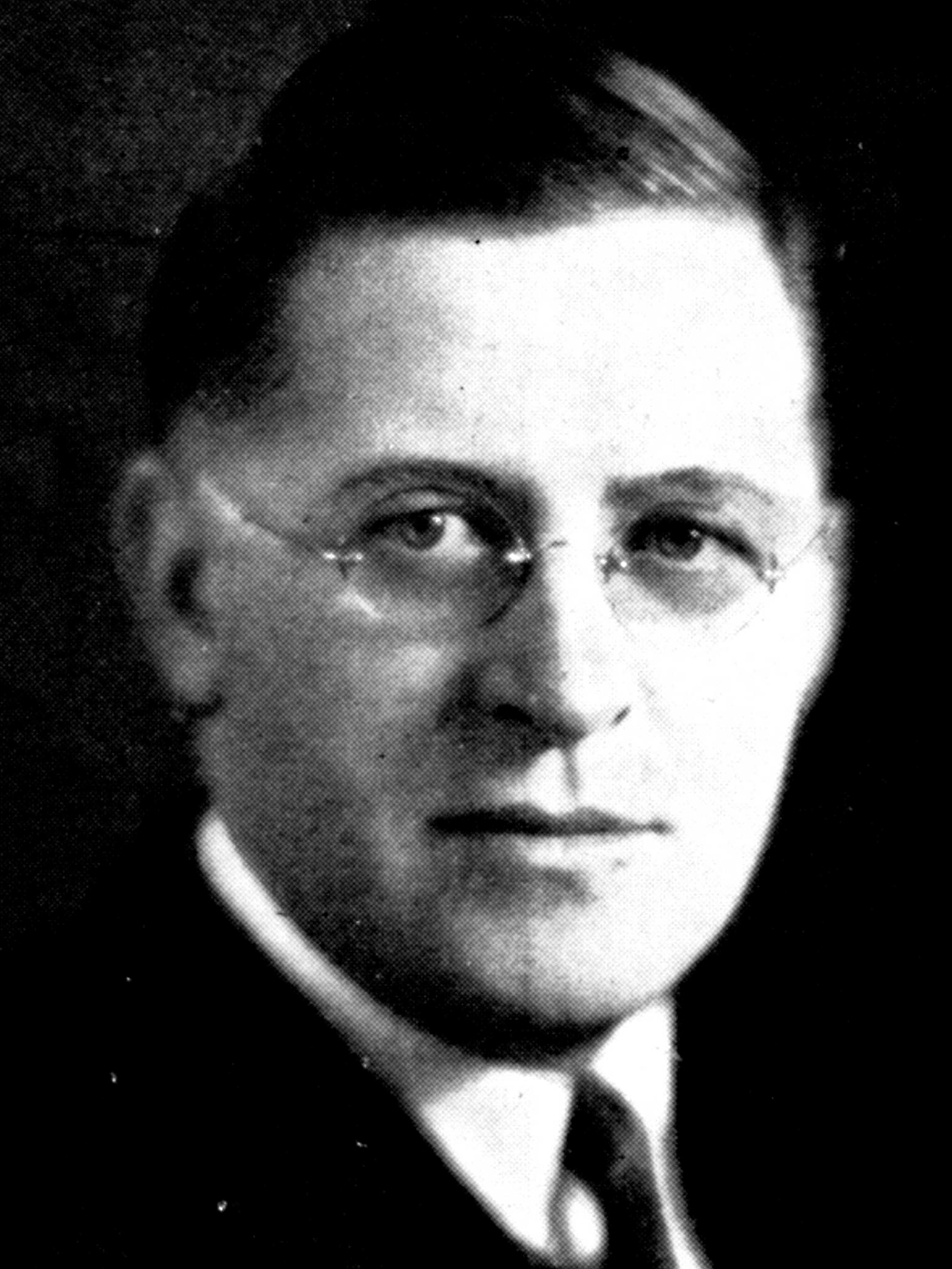

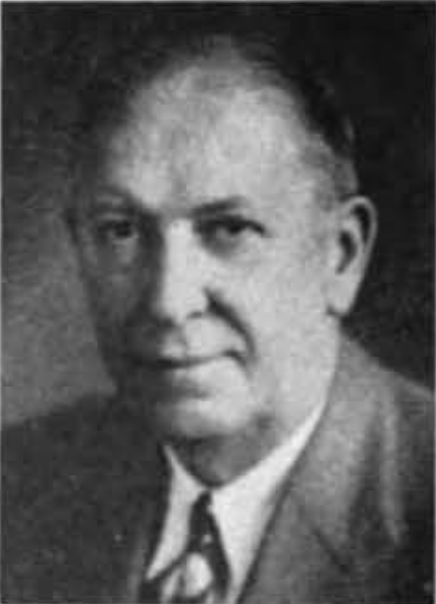
Nominee	Joseph H. Ball	Elmer A. Benson
Party	Republican	Farmer–Labor
Popular vote	356,297	213,965
Percentage	46.98%	28.21%
Nominee	Martin A. Nelson	Ed Murphy
Party	Independent	Democratic
Popular vote	109,226	78,959
Percentage	14.40%	10.41%
- County results Ball: 30–40% 40–50% 50–60% 60–70% Benson: 40–50% 50–60% Nelson: 30–40% 40–50%
U.S. senator before election
Joseph H. Ball
Republican
Elected U.S. Senator
Joseph H. Ball
Republican

Minnesota regular election
Party	Candidate	Votes	%
Republican	Joseph H. Ball (Incumbent)	356,297	46.98%
Farmer–Labor	Elmer A. Benson	213,965	28.21%
Independent	Martin A. Nelson	109,226	14.40%
Democratic	Ed Murphy	78,959	10.41%
Majority		142,232	18.77%
Turnout		758,447	
Republican hold			

== Mississippi ==
1942 U.S. Senate Democratic primary in Mississippi
- September 15, 1942
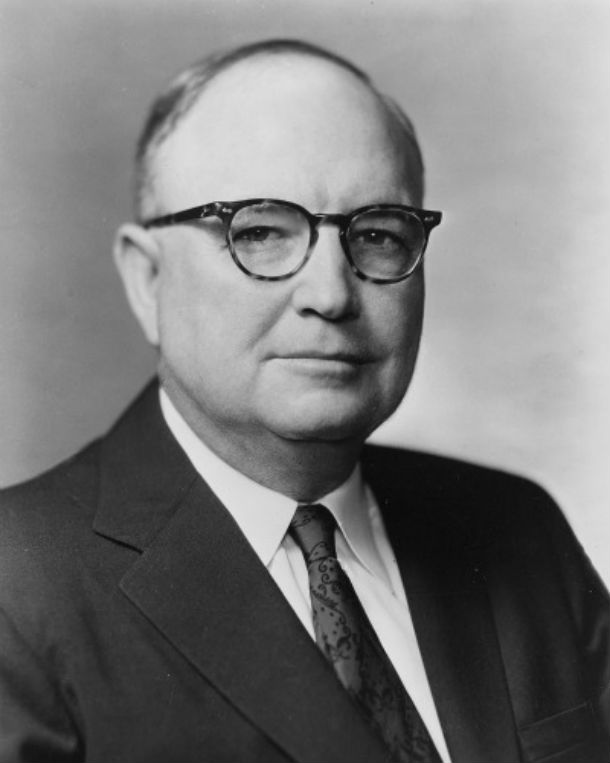

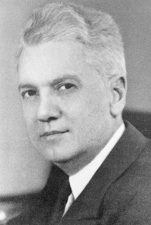
Nominee	James Eastland	Wall Doxey
Party	Democratic	Democratic
Popular vote	74,747	56,748
Percentage	56.84%	43.16%
- County results Eastland: 50–60% 60–70% 70–80% 80–90% >90% Doxey: 50–60% 60–70% 70–80% 80–90% Tie: 50%
U.S. senator before election
Wall Doxey
Democratic
Elected U.S. Senator
James Eastland
Democratic

1942 United States Senate election in Mississippi
Party	Candidate	Votes	%
Democratic	James Eastland	51,355	100.00%
Democratic hold			

== Montana ==
1942 United States Senate election in Montana
- November 3, 1942
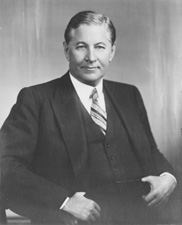

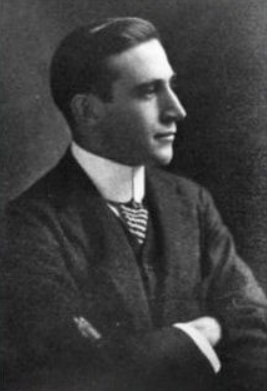
Nominee	James E. Murray	Wellington D. Rankin
Party	Democratic	Republican
Popular vote	83,673	82,461
Percentage	49.07%	48.36%
- County results Murray: 40–50% 50–60% Rankin: 40–50% 50–60% 60–70% 70–80%
U.S. senator before election
James E. Murray
Democratic
Elected U.S. Senator
James E. Murray
Democratic

1942 United States Senate election in Montana
Party	Candidate	Votes	%	±%
Democratic	James E. Murray (Incumbent)	83,673	49.07%	−5.91%
Republican	Wellington D. Rankin	82,461	48.36%	+21.25%
Prohibition	Charles R. Miller	2,711	1.59%	
Socialist	E. H. Helterbran	1,669	0.98%	
Majority		1,212	0.71%	−27.16%
Turnout		170,514		
Democratic hold		Swing		

== Nebraska ==
1942 United States Senate election in Nebraska
- November 3, 1942
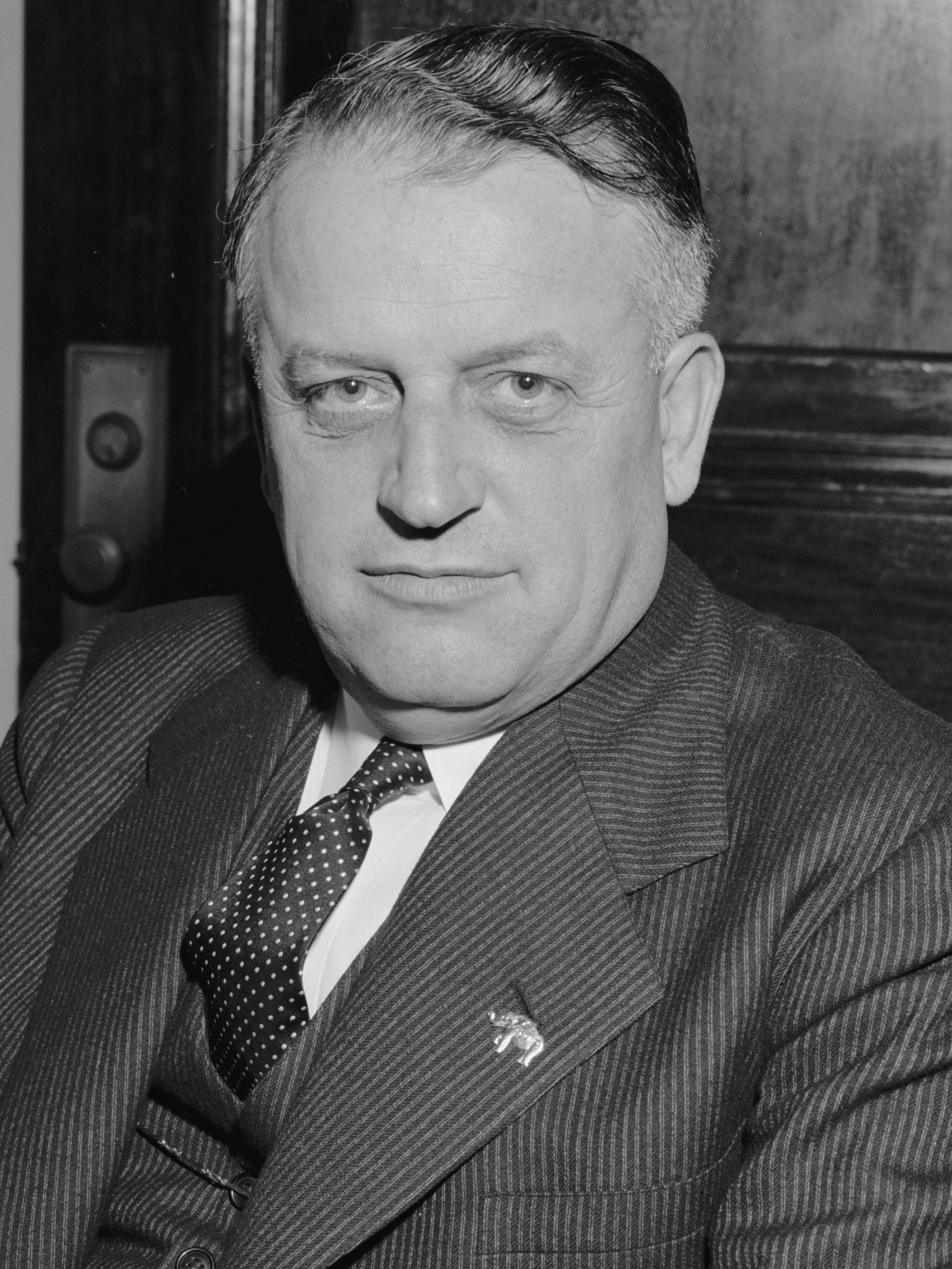

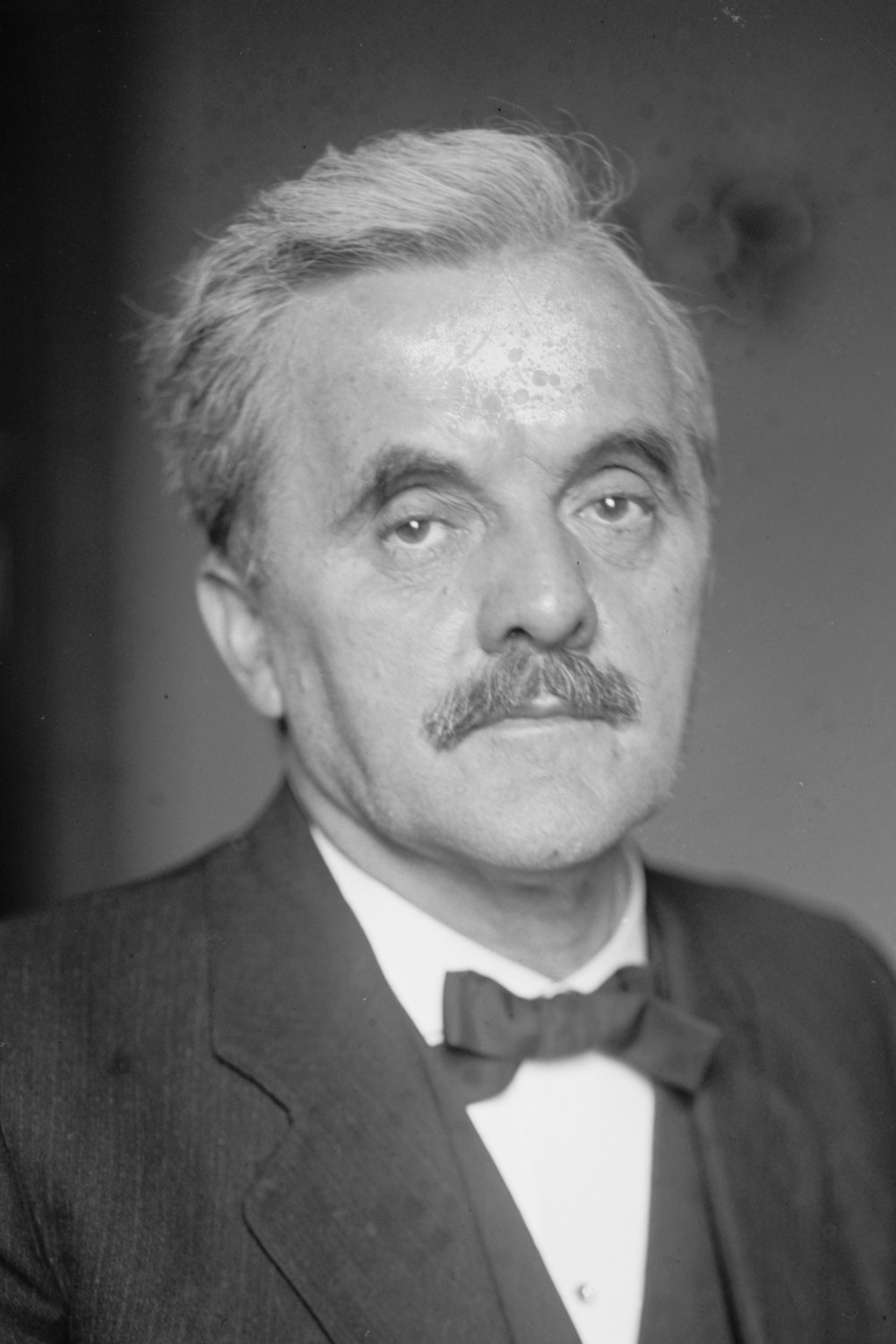

Nominee	Kenneth Wherry	George Norris	Foster May
Party	Republican	Independent	Democratic
Popular vote	186,207	108,899	83,763
Percentage	48.97%	28.64%	22.03%
- County results Wherry: 30–40% 40–50% 50–60% 60–70% 70–80% Norris: 30–40% 30–40% May: 30–40%
U.S. senator before election
George W. Norris
Independent
Elected U.S. Senator
Kenneth Wherry
Republican

1942 United States Senate election in Nebraska
Party	Candidate	Votes	%
Republican	Kenneth S. Wherry	186,207	48.97%
Independent	George W. Norris (Incumbent)	108,899	28.64%
Democratic	Foster May	83,768	22.03%
Independent	Albert F. Ruthven	1,348	0.35%
Majority		77,308	20.33%
Turnout		380,222	
Republican gain from Independent			

== Nevada (special) ==
1942 United States Senate special election in Nevada
- November 3, 1942
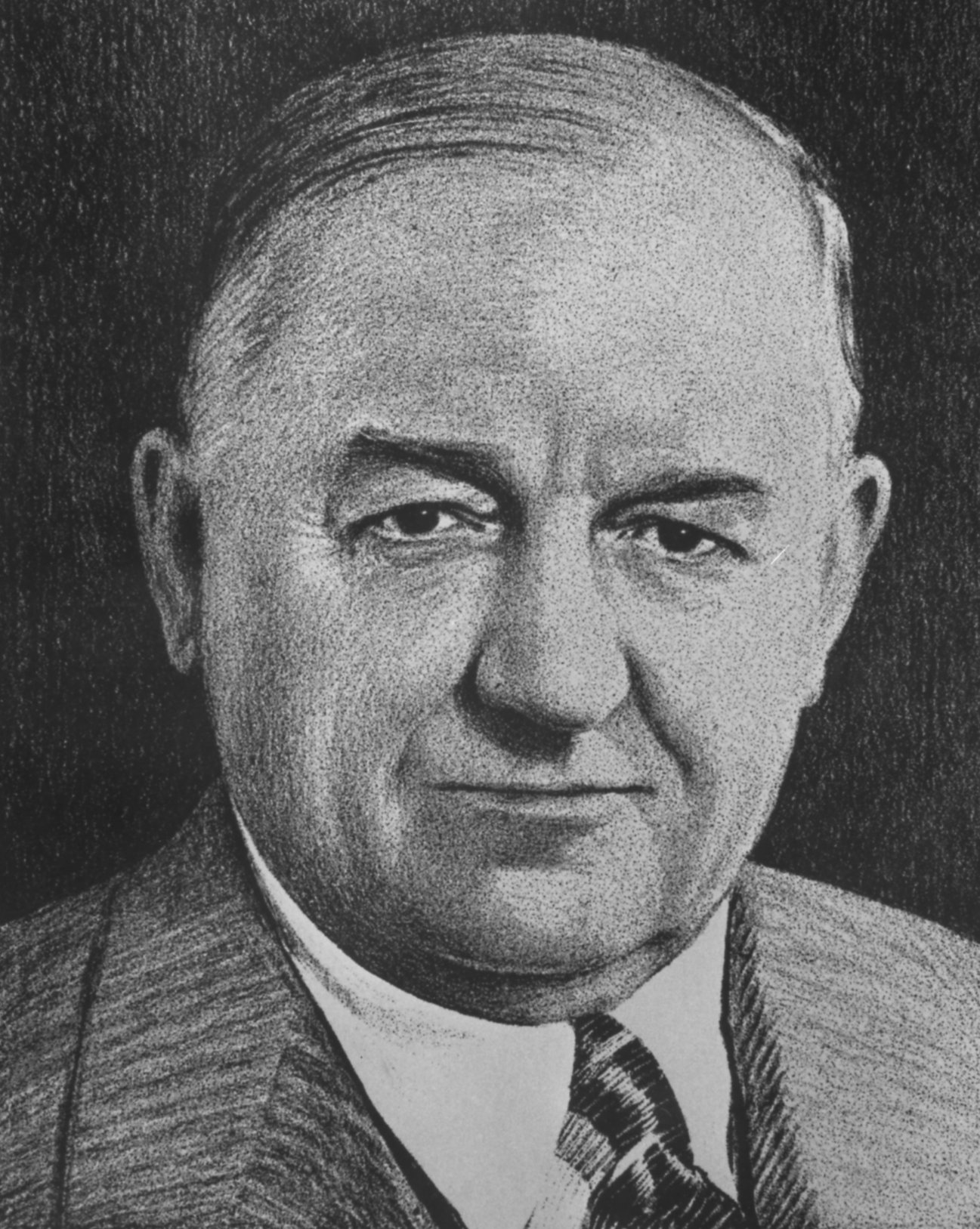
Nominee	James G. Scrugham	Cecil W. Creel
Party	Democratic	Republican
Popular vote	23,805	16,735
Percentage	58.72%	41.28%
- County results Scrugham: 50–60% 60–70% 70–80% Creel: 50–60% 60–70%
U.S. senator before election
Berkeley L. Bunker
Democratic
Elected U.S. Senator
James G. Scrugham
Democratic

1942 United States Senate special election in Nevada
Party	Candidate	Votes	%
Democratic	James G. Scrugham	23,805	58.72%
Republican	Cecil W. Creel	16,735	41.28%
Majority		7,070	17.44%
Turnout		40,540	
Democratic hold			

== New Hampshire ==
1942 United States Senate election in New Hampshire
- November 3, 1942
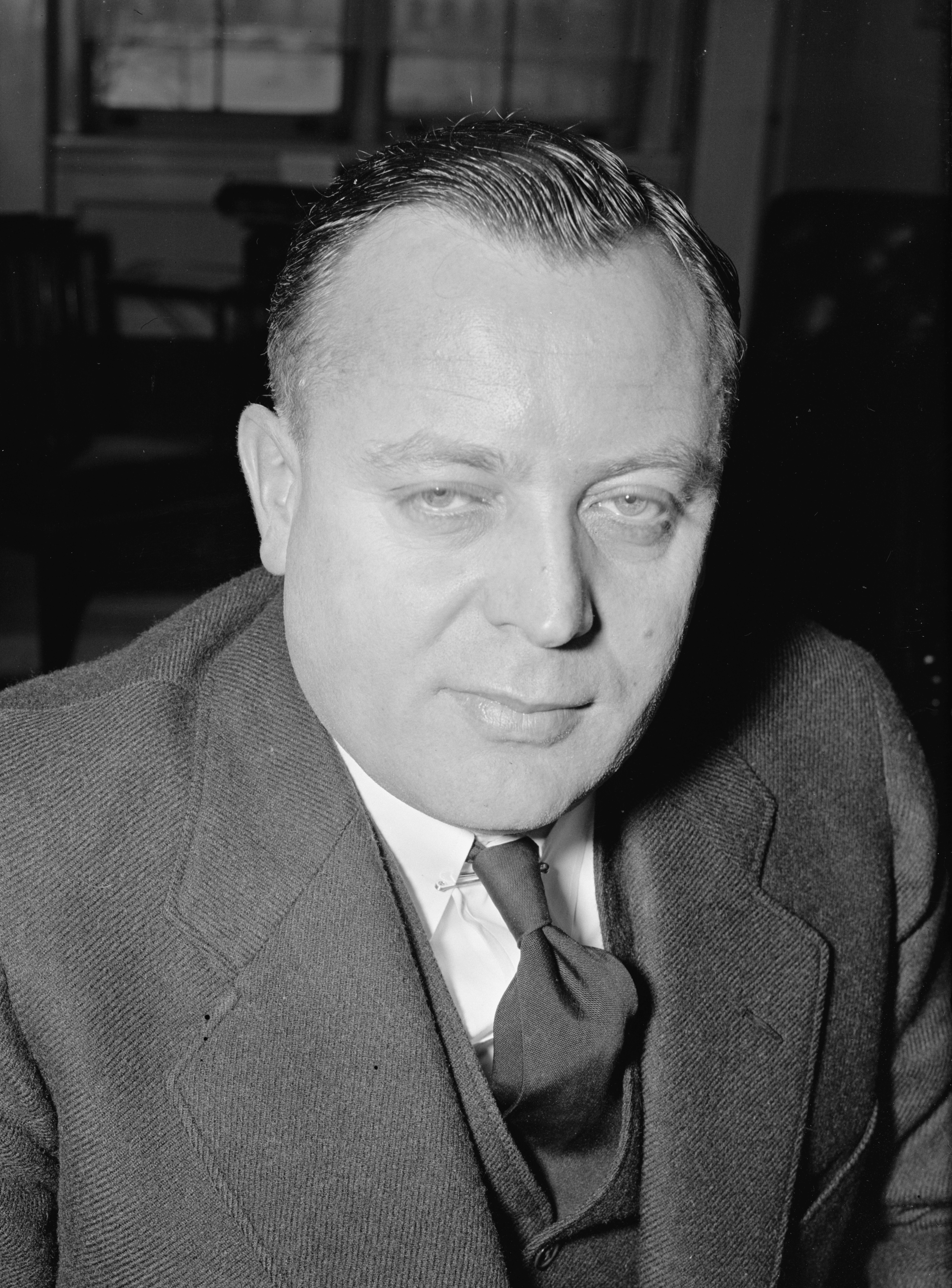

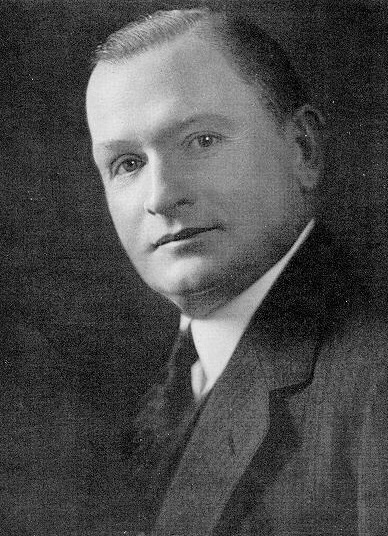
Nominee	Styles Bridges	Francis P. Murphy
Party	Republican	Democratic
Popular vote	88,601	73,656
Percentage	54.60%	45.40%
- Bridges: 50–60% 60–70% 70–80% 80–90% 90-100% Murphy: 50–60% 60–70% 70–80% 80–90% Tie: 50%
U.S. senator before election
Styles Bridges
Republican
Elected U.S. Senator
Styles Bridges
Republican

1942 United States Senate election in New Hampshire
Party	Candidate	Votes	%
Republican	Styles Bridges (Incumbent)	88,601	54.61%
Democratic	Francis P. Murphy	73,656	45.39%
Majority		14,945	9.22%
Turnout		162,257	
Republican hold			

== New Jersey ==
1942 United States Senate election in New Jersey
- November 3, 1942
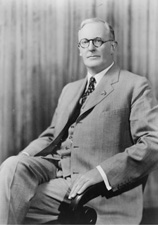

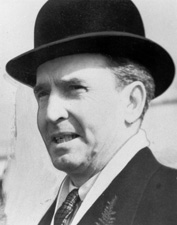
Nominee	Albert Hawkes	William Smathers
Party	Republican	Democratic
Popular vote	648,855	559,851
Percentage	53.09%	45.81%
- County results Hawkes: 50–60% 60–70% 70–80% Smathers: 50–60% 70–80%
Senator before election
William Smathers
Democratic
Elected Senator
Albert Hawkes
Republican

1942 United States Senate election in New Jersey
Party	Candidate	Votes	%
Republican	Albert W. Hawkes	648,855	53.09%
Democratic	William H. Smathers (Incumbent)	559,851	45.81%
Socialist	William L. Becker	6,775	0.55%
Independent Progressive	Lorenzo Harris	3,224	0.26%
Prohibition	Elmo L. Bateman	1,438	0.12%
Socialist Labor	John C. Butterworth	1,310	0.11%
Socialist Workers	George Breitman	679	0.06%
Majority		89,004	7.28%
Turnout		1,222,132	
Republican gain from Democratic			

== New Mexico ==
1942 United States Senate election in New Mexico
- November 3, 1942
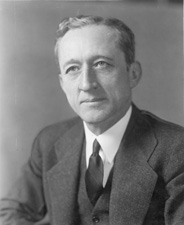
Nominee	Carl Hatch	J. Benson Newell
Party	Democratic	Republican
Popular vote	63,301	43,704
Percentage	59.16%	40.84%
- County results Hatch: 50–60% 60–70% 70–80% 80–90% Newell: 50–60%
U.S. senator before election
Carl Hatch
Democratic
Elected U.S. Senator
Carl Hatch
Democratic

1942 United States Senate election in New Mexico
Party	Candidate	Votes	%
Democratic	Carl Hatch (Incumbent)	63,301	59.16%
Republican	J. Benson Newell	43,704	40.84%
Majority		19,597	18.32%
Turnout		107,005	
Democratic hold			

== North Carolina ==
1942 United States Senate election in North Carolina
- November 3, 1942
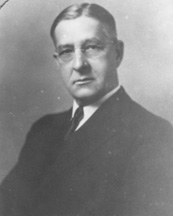

Nominee	Josiah Bailey	Sam J. Morris
Party	Democratic	Republican
Popular vote	230,427	119,165
Percentage	65.91%	34.09%
- County results Bailey: 50–60% 60–70% 70–80% 80–90% 90–100% Morris: 50–60% 60–70% 70–80%
Senator before election
Josiah Bailey
Democratic
Elected Senator
Josiah Bailey
Democratic

1942 United States Senate election in North Carolina
Party	Candidate	Votes	%
Democratic	Josiah Bailey (Incumbent)	230,427	65.91%
Republican	Sam J. Morris	119,165	34.09%
Majority		111,262	31.82%
Turnout		349,592	
Democratic hold			

== Oklahoma ==
1942 United States Senate election in Oklahoma
- November 3, 1942
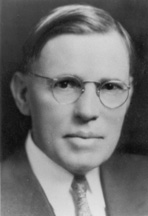

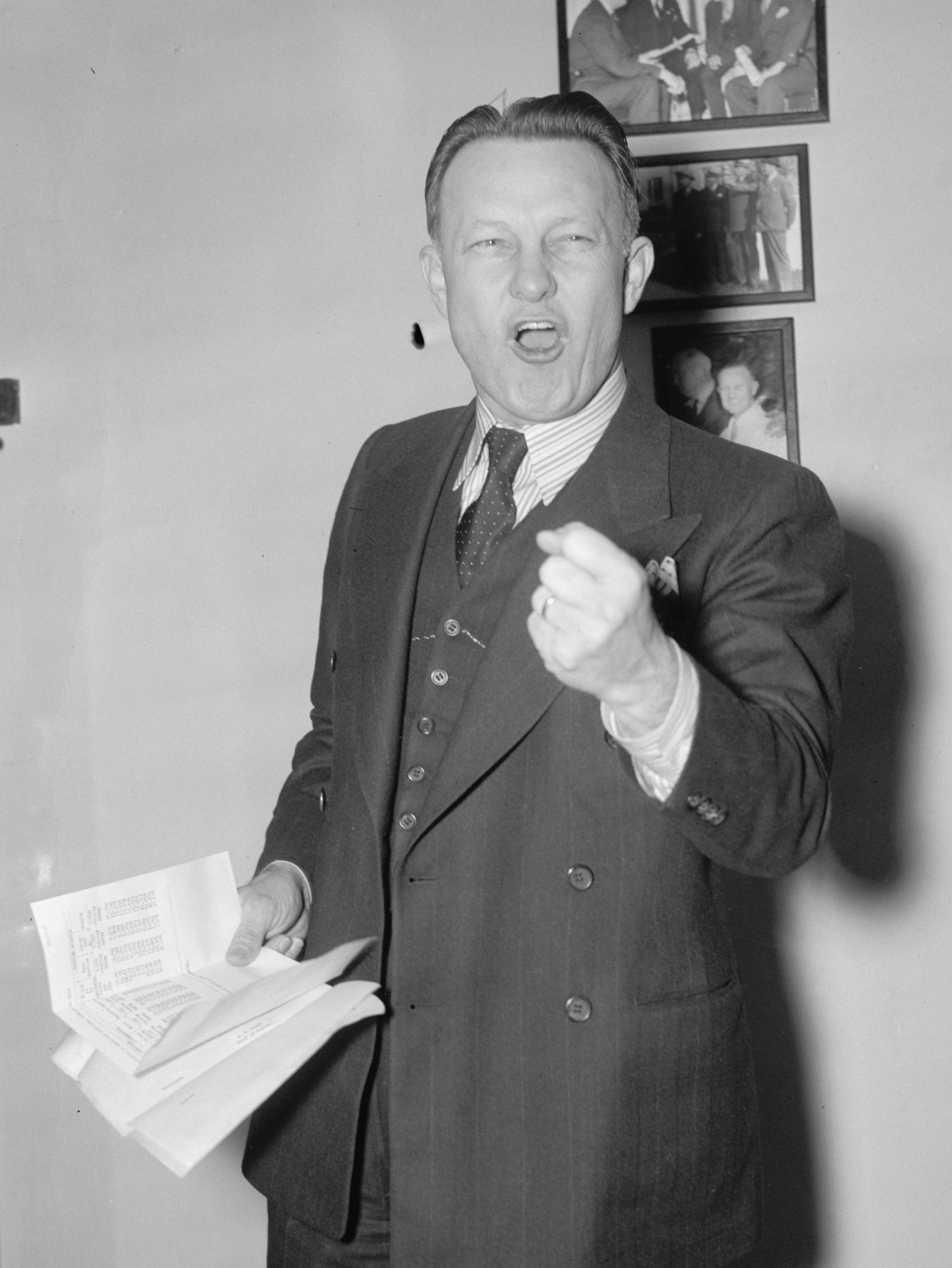
Nominee	Edward H. Moore	Joshua B. Lee
Party	Republican	Democratic
Popular vote	204,163	166,653
Percentage	54.83%	44.76%
- County results Moore: 50–60% 60–70% 70–80% Lee: 50–60% 60–70% 70–80% 80–90%
U.S. senator before election
Joshua B. Lee
Democratic
Elected U.S. Senator
Edward H. Moore
Republican

1942 United States Senate election in Oklahoma
Party	Candidate	Votes	%
Republican	Edward H. Moore	204,163	54.83%
Democratic	Joshua B. Lee (Incumbent)	166,653	44.76%
Prohibition	Oliver W. Lawton	1,549	0.42%
Majority		37,510	10.07%
Turnout		372,365	
Republican gain from Democratic			

== Oregon ==
1942 United States Senate election in Oregon
- November 3, 1942
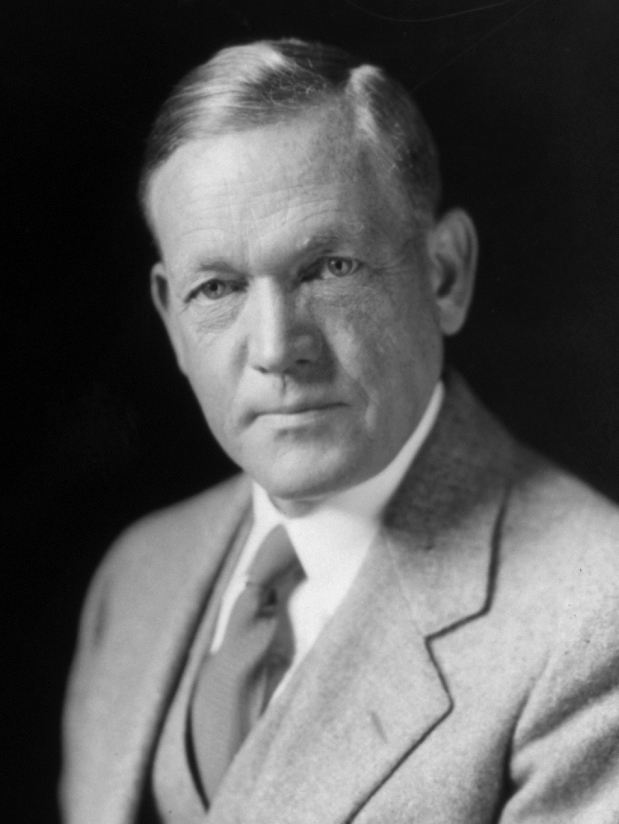
Nominee	Charles L. McNary	Walter W. Whitbeck
Party	Republican	Democratic
Popular vote	214,755	63,946
Percentage	77.06%	22.94%
- County results McNary: 70–80% 80–90%
Senator before election
Charles L. McNary
Republican
Elected Senator
Charles L. McNary
Republican

1942 United States Senate election in Oregon
Party	Candidate	Votes	%
Republican	Charles L. McNary (Incumbent)	214,755	77.06%
Democratic	Walter W. Whitbeck	63,946	22.94%
Majority		150,809	54.12%
Turnout		278,701	
Republican hold			

== Rhode Island ==
1942 United States Senate election in Rhode Island
Party	Candidate	Votes	%
Democratic	Theodore F. Green (Incumbent)	138,247	57.97%
Republican	Ira Lloyd Letts	100,240	42.03%
Majority		38,007	15.94%
Turnout			
Democratic hold			

== South Carolina ==
1942 Democratic Senate primary in South Carolina
- August 25, 1942
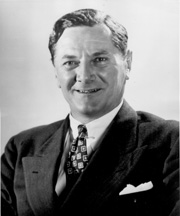

Nominee	Burnet R. Maybank	Eugene Blease
Party	Democratic	Democratic
Popular vote	120,731	114,241
Percentage	51.38%	48.62%
- County results Maybank: 50–60% 60–70% 80–90% Blease: 50–60% 60–70% 80–90%
U.S. senator before election
Burnet R. Maybank
Democratic
Elected U.S. Senator
Burnet R. Maybank
Democratic

South Carolina general election
Party	Candidate	Votes	%
Democratic	Burnet R. Maybank (Incumbent)	22,556	>99.9%
No party	Write-Ins	2	<0.1%
Majority		22,554	>99.9%
Turnout		22,558	
Democratic hold			

== South Dakota ==
1942 United States Senate election in South Dakota
- November 3, 1942
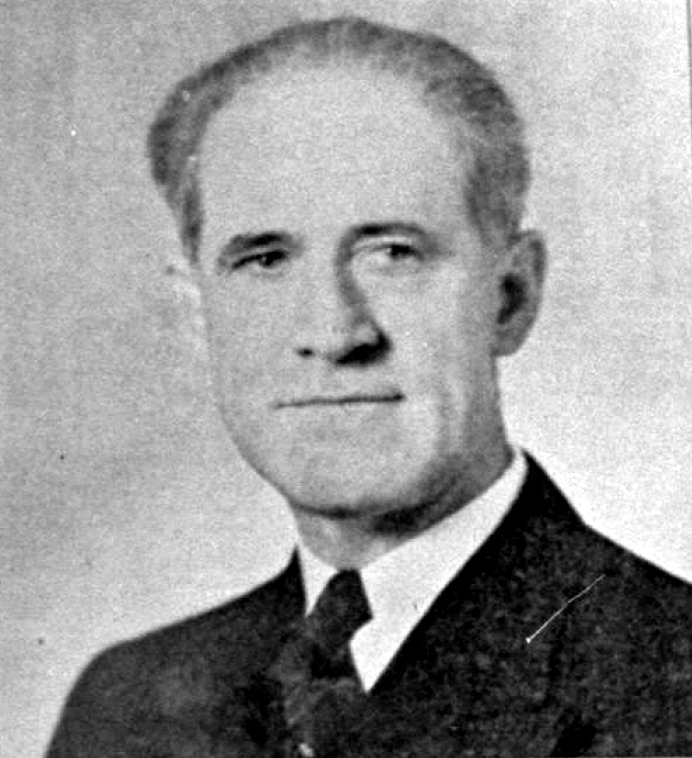

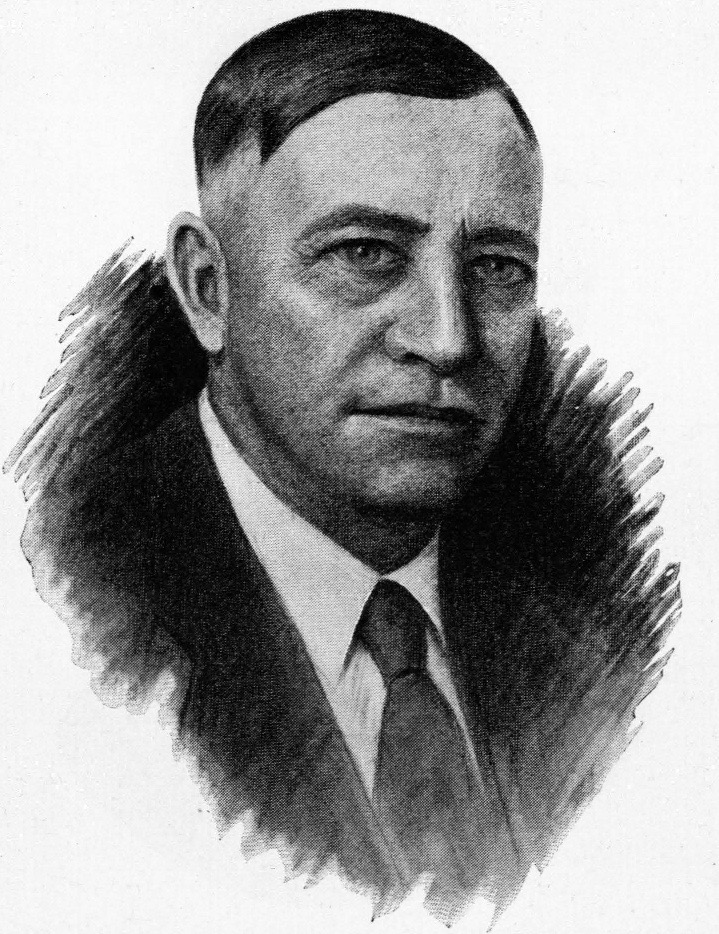
Nominee	Harlan J. Bushfield	Tom Berry
Party	Republican	Democratic
Popular vote	106,704	74,945
Percentage	58.74%	41.26%
- County results Bushfield: 50–60% 60–70% 70–80% 80–90% Berry: 50–60% 60–70% No Vote
U.S. senator before election
William J. Bulow
Democratic
Elected U.S. Senator
Harlan J. Bushfield
Republican

1942 United States Senate election in South Dakota
Party	Candidate	Votes	%
Republican	Harlan J. Bushfield	106,704	58.74%
Democratic	Tom Berry	74,945	41.26%
Majority		31,759	17.48%
Turnout		181,649	
Republican gain from Democratic			

== Tennessee ==
1942 United States Senate election in Tennessee
- November 3, 1942
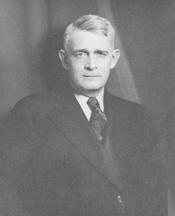

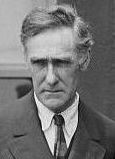
Nominee	Tom Stewart	F. Todd Meacham	John Randolph Neal Jr.
Party	Democratic	Republican	Independent
Popular vote	109,881	34,324	15,317
Percentage	68.88%	21.52%	9.60%
Senator before election
Tom Stewart
Democratic
Elected Senator
Tom Stewart
Democratic

1942 United States Senate election in Tennessee
Party	Candidate	Votes	%
Democratic	Tom Stewart (Incumbent)	109,881	68.88%
Republican	F. Todd Meacham	34,324	21.52%
Independent	John Randolph Neal Jr.	15,317	9.60%
Majority		75,557	47.36%
Turnout		159,522	
Democratic hold			

== Texas ==
Texas election
- November 3, 1942
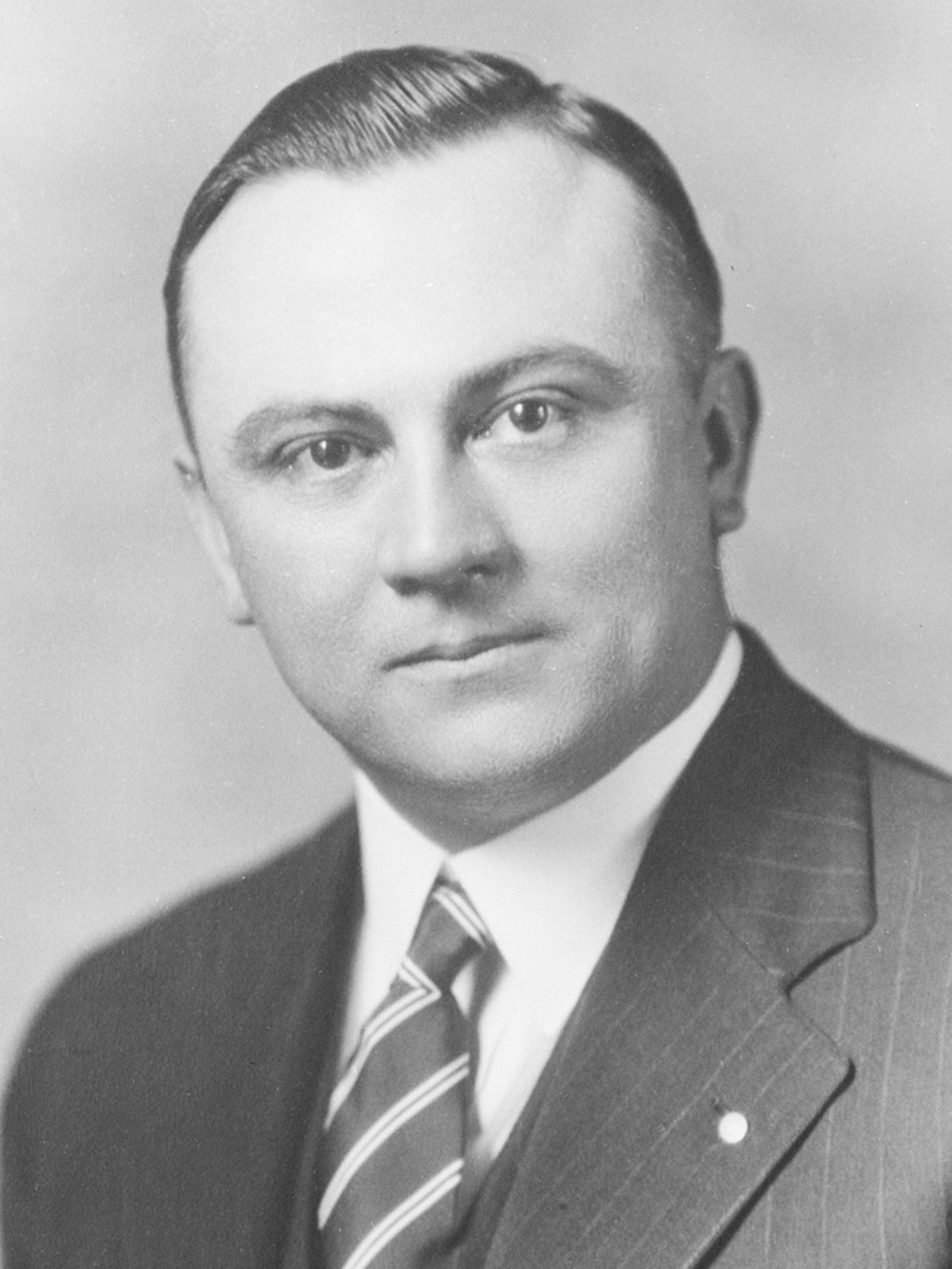
Nominee	Pappy O'Daniel	Dudley Lawson
Party	Democratic	Republican
Popular vote	260,629	12,064
Percentage	94.90%	4.39%
- County results. O'Daniel: 60–70% 70–80% 80–90% >90% No vote
U.S. senator before election
Pappy O'Daniel
Democratic
Elected U.S. Senator
Pappy O'Daniel
Democratic

1942 United States Senate election in Texas
Party	Candidate	Votes	%
Democratic	W. Lee O'Daniel (Incumbent)	260,629	94.90%
Republican	Dudley Lawson	12,064	4.39%
People’s Unity	Charles L. Somerville	1,934	0.70%
Majority		248,565	90.51%
Turnout		274,627	
Democratic hold			

== Virginia ==
1942 United States Senate election in Virginia
- November 3, 1942
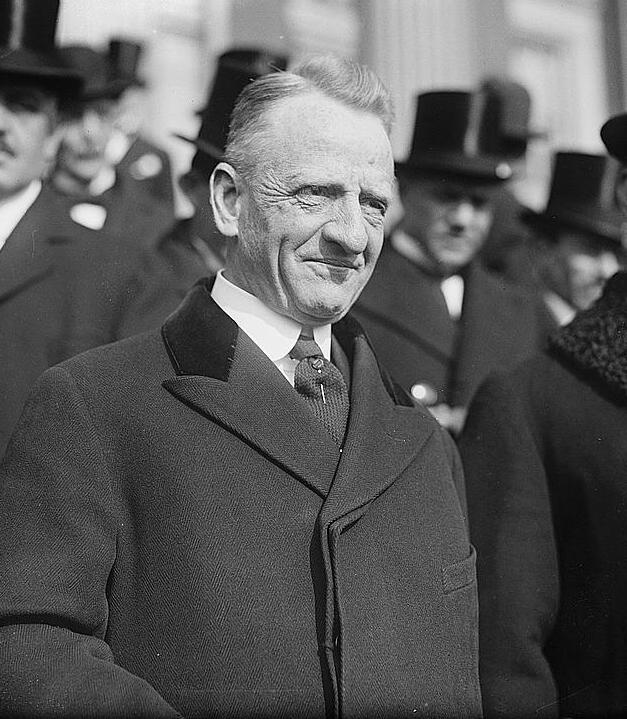

Nominee	Carter Glass	Lawrence S. Wilkes
Party	Democratic	Socialist
Popular vote	79,421	5,690
Percentage	91.08%	6.53%
- County and independent city results Glass: 80–90% 90–100% No Data/Vote
U.S. senator before election
Carter Glass
Democratic
Elected U.S. Senator
Carter Glass
Democratic

1942 United States Senate election in Virginia
Party	Candidate	Votes	%	±%
Democratic	Carter Glass (Incumbent)	79,421	91.08%	+0.58%
Socialist	Lawrence S. Wilkes	5,690	6.53%	+6.53%
Communist	Alice Burke	2,041	2.34%	−1.00%
Write-ins		48	<0.01%	−0.07%
Majority		73,731	84.55%	−2.40%
Turnout		87,200		
Democratic hold				

== West Virginia ==
There were 2 elections to the same seat due to the January 12, 1941 resignation of Democrat Matthew M. Neely who was elected Governor of West Virginia. Democrat Joseph Rosier was appointed January 13, 1941 to continue the term, pending the special election. Primaries for both races were held August 4, 1942.

=== West Virginia (special) ===
1942 United States Senate special election in West Virginia
- November 3, 1942
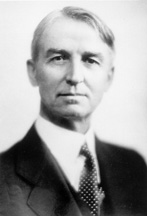

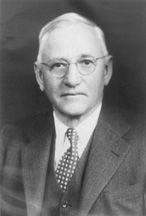
Nominee	Hugh Ike Shott	Joseph Rosier
Party	Republican	Democratic
Popular vote	227,469	207,678
Percentage	52.27%	47.73%
- County results Shott: 50–60% 60–70% 70–80% 80–90% Rosier: 50–60% 60–70%
U.S. senator before election
Joseph Rosier
Democratic
Elected U.S. Senator
Hugh Ike Shott
Republican

Interim Democrat Joseph Rosier easily won the primary, but lost the special election to finish the term that would end in January 1943 to former congressman and 1936 Senate nominee Hugh Ike Shott.

West Virginia special election, November 3, 1942
Party	Candidate	Votes	%
Republican	Hugh Ike Shott	227,469	52.27%
Democratic	Joseph Rosier (Incumbent)	207,678	47.73%
Majority		19,791	4.54%
Turnout		435,147	22.88%
Republican gain from Democratic			

=== West Virginia (regular) ===
1942 United States Senate election in West Virginia
- November 3, 1942
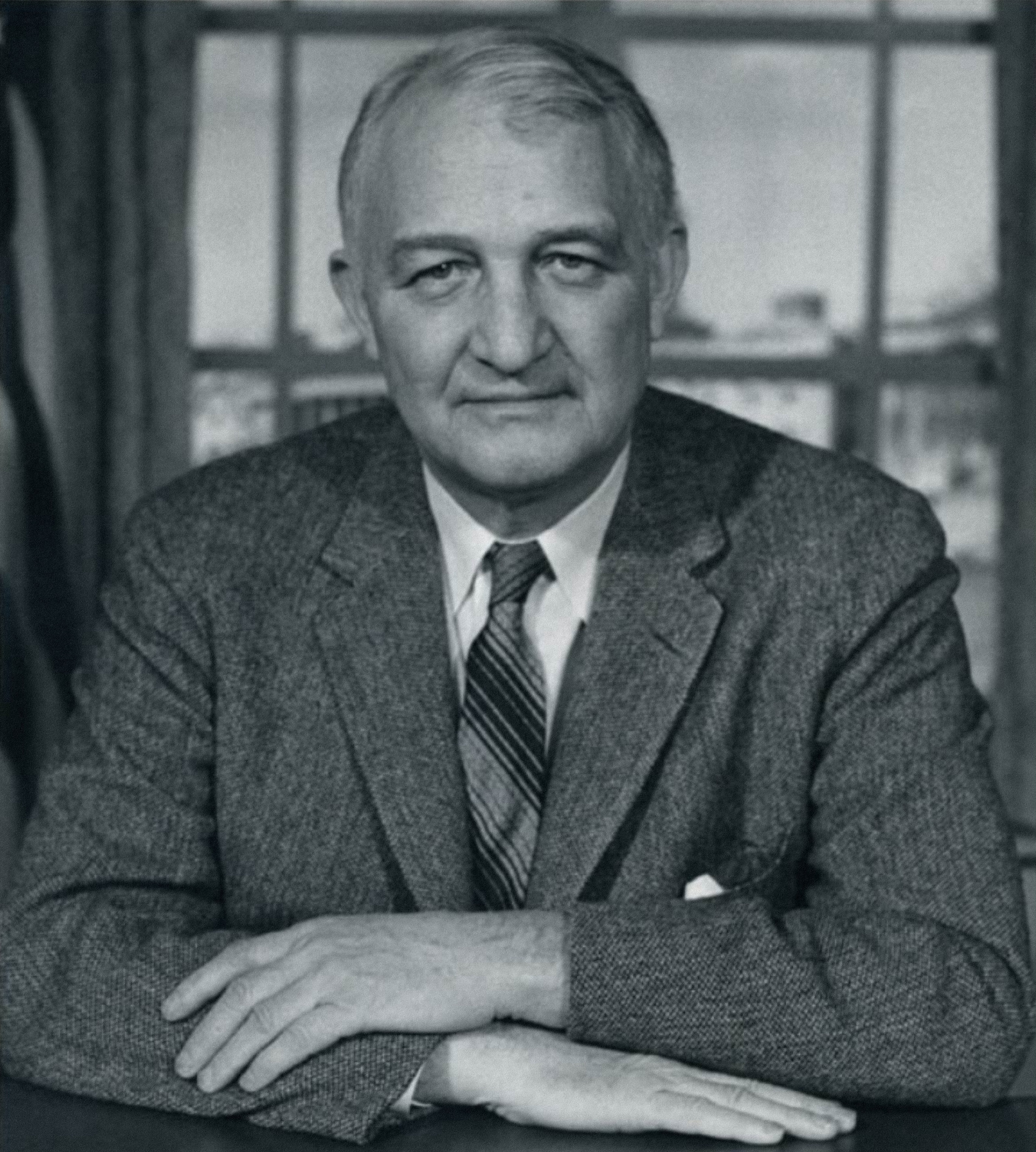

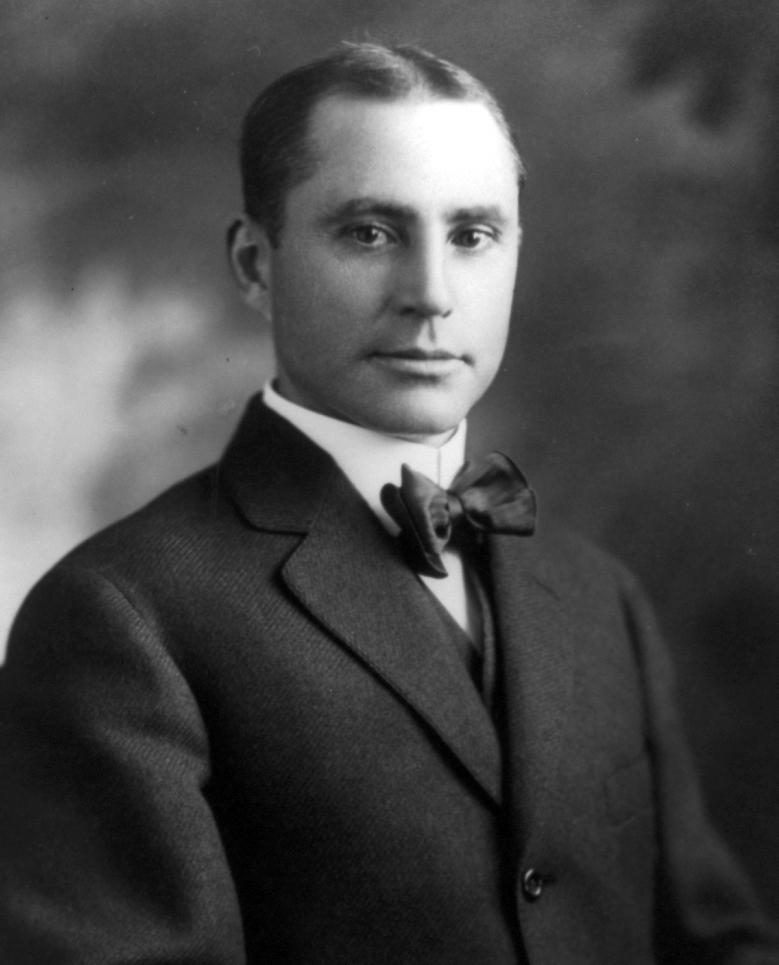
Nominee	Chapman Revercomb	Matthew M. Neely
Party	Republican	Democratic
Popular vote	256,816	207,045
Percentage	55.36%	44.64%
- County results Revercomb: 50–60% 60–70% 70–80% 80–90% Neely: 50–60% 60–70%
U.S. senator before election
Matthew M. Neely
Democratic
Elected U.S. Senator
Chapman Revercomb
Republican

Neither Shott nor Rosier were candidates in the regular election. Instead, governor (and former senator) Neely ran to reclaim his seat, having regretted leaving the Senate.

Neely won the Democratic primary but lost the regular election.

West Virginia regular election
Party	Candidate	Votes	%
Republican	Chapman Revercomb	256,816	55.36%
Democratic	Matthew M. Neely	207,045	44.64%
Majority		49,771	10.72%
Turnout		463,861	24.39%
Republican gain from Democratic			

At the end of the term, Revercomb would lose re-election to Neely in 1948. He then won a special election to the other seat in 1956.

== Wyoming ==
1942 United States Senate election in Wyoming
- November 3, 1942
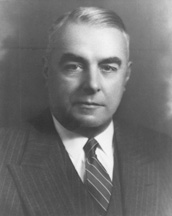

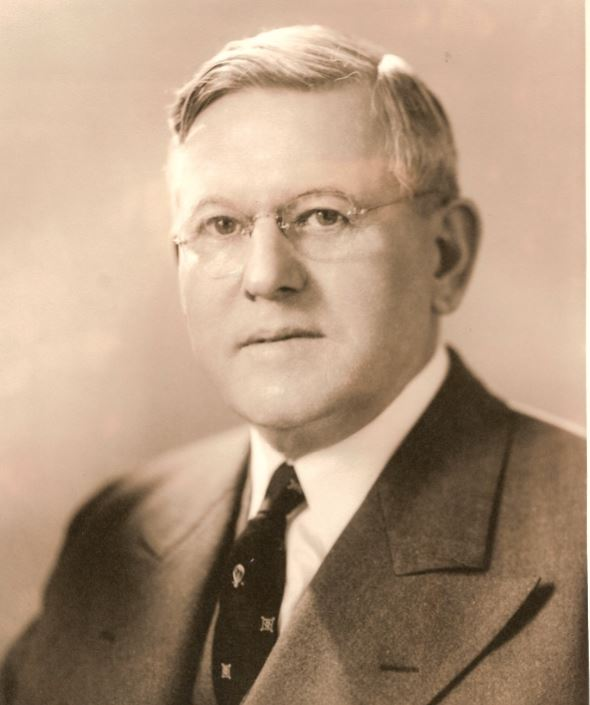
Nominee	Edward V. Robertson	Harry Schwartz
Party	Republican	Democratic
Popular vote	41,486	34,503
Percentage	54.59%	45.41%
- County results Robertson: 50–60% 60–70% 70–80% Schwartz: 50–60% 60–70%
U.S. senator before election
Harry Schwartz
Democratic
Elected U.S. Senator
Edward V. Robertson
Republican

1942 United States Senate election in Wyoming
Party	Candidate	Votes	%
Republican	Edward V. Robertson	41,486	54.59%
Democratic	Henry H. Schwartz (Incumbent)	34,503	45.41%
Majority		6,983	9.18%
Turnout		75,989	
Republican gain from Democratic			

== See also ==
- 1942 United States elections
  - 1942 United States gubernatorial elections
  - 1942 United States House of Representatives elections
- 77th United States Congress
- 78th United States Congress
