= 1942 Tennessee gubernatorial election =

- November 3, 1942
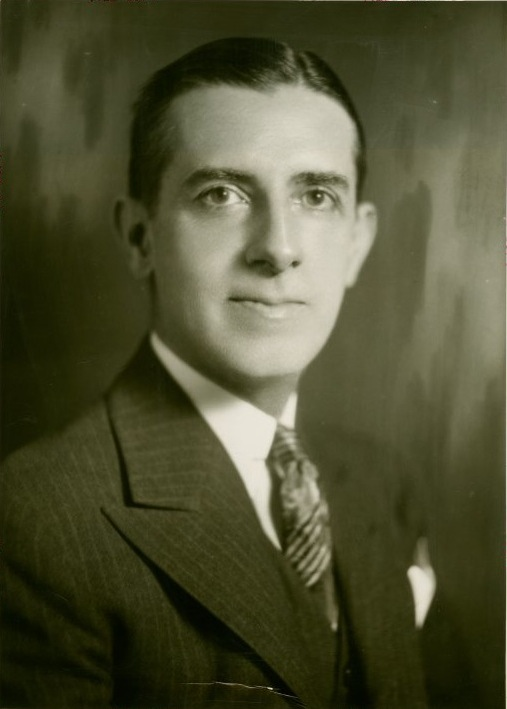

Nominee	Prentice Cooper	C. N. Frazier
Party	Democratic	Republican
Popular vote	120,148	51,120
Percentage	70.15%	29.85%
- County results Cooper: 50–60% 60–70% 70–80% 80–90% >90% Frazier: 50–60% 60–70% 70–80%
Governor before election
Prentice Cooper
Democratic
Elected Governor
Prentice Cooper
Democratic

The 1942 Tennessee gubernatorial election was held on November 3, 1942. Incumbent Democratic governor Prentice Cooper defeated Republican nominee C. N. Frazier with 70.2% of the vote.

In the Democratic primary, Judge John Ridley Mitchell, who despised Memphis political boss E. H. Crump, sought the party's nomination for governor but was defeated by Cooper, 171,259 votes to 124,037.

== Background ==
In 1942, the federal government appropriated land in what is now Oak Ridge, Tennessee, for the top secret Manhattan Project which was developing the world's first atomic bomb. Cooper was not informed of the purpose of the project. When Anderson Countians complained to Cooper of land appropriations, Cooper accused the federal government of stealing the land for a "socialist" project. When officially notified in July 1943 by an Army lieutenant of the presidential proclamation making the area a military district not subject to state control, he angrily ripped it to pieces. The new MED District Engineer Lieutenant Colonel Kenneth Nichols had to placate him.

Along with defense mobilization, Cooper increased funding for state schools and implemented a program that provided free textbooks for children in grades 1 through 3. He increased aid to the elderly, established a system of tuberculosis hospitals, and acquired land for state parks and state forests. He cut the state payroll and placed taxes on alcohol, and he managed to reduce the state debt by $21 million. In January 1941, a Cooper-supported bill calling for a repeal of the state's poll tax was introduced in the state legislature but was defeated. In 1943, the repeal passed but was thrown out by the Tennessee Supreme Court.

== Primary elections ==
Primary elections were held on August 6, 1942.

=== Democratic primary ===
==== Candidates ====
- Prentice Cooper, incumbent governor
- John Ridley Mitchell, former U.S. representative from Cookeville and former judge of the fifth circuit of Tennessee
- J. Bailey Wray

==== Results ====
Democratic primary results
Party	Candidate	Votes	%
Democratic	Prentice Cooper (incumbent)	171,259	57.63%
Democratic	John Ridley Mitchell	124,037	41.74%
Democratic	J. Bailey Wray	1,901	0.64%
Total votes		297,197	100.00%

== General election ==
=== Candidates ===
- Prentice Cooper, Democratic
- C. N. Frazier, Republican

=== Results ===
1942 Tennessee gubernatorial election
Party	Candidate	Votes	%	±%
Democratic	Prentice Cooper (incumbent)	120,148	70.15%	
Republican	C. N. Frazier	51,120	29.85%	
Majority		69,028		
Turnout				
Democratic hold		Swing		

== See also ==
- 1942 United States Senate election in Tennessee
