= 1942 United States Senate election in Tennessee =

- November 3, 1942
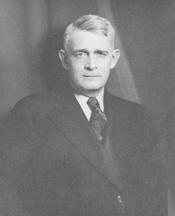

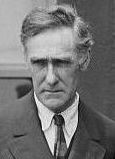
Nominee	Tom Stewart	F. Todd Meacham	John Randolph Neal Jr.
Party	Democratic	Republican	Independent
Popular vote	109,881	34,324	15,317
Percentage	68.88%	21.52%	9.60%
- Results by county Stewart: 30–40% 40–50% 50–60% 60–70% 70–80% 80–90% >90% Meacham: 40–50% 50–60%
Senator before election
Tom Stewart
Democratic
Elected Senator
Tom Stewart
Democratic

The 1942 United States Senate election in Tennessee took place on November 3, 1942, concurrently with United States Senate elections in other states as well as elections to the United States House of Representatives and various state and local elections. Incumbent Democratic Senator Tom Stewart won re-election to a full term, defeating Republican candidate F. Todd Meacham.

== Democratic primary ==
=== Candidates ===
- Edward W. Carmack Jr., son of Edward W. Carmack
- John Randolph Neal Jr., attorney, law professor, politician, and activist
- Tom Stewart, incumbent senator

Democratic Party primary results
Party	Candidate	Votes	%
Democratic	Tom Stewart (incumbent)	136,415	51.89%
Democratic	Edward W. Carmack Jr.	116,841	44.44%
Democratic	John Randolph Neal Jr.	9,653	3.67%
Total votes		262,909	100.00%

== General election ==
General election results
Party	Candidate	Votes	%
Democratic	Tom Stewart (incumbent)	109,881	68.88%
Republican	F. Todd Meacham	34,324	21.52%
Independent	John Randolph Neal Jr.	15,317	9.60%
Majority		75,557	47.36%
Turnout		159,522	
Democratic hold			

== See also ==
- 1942 United States Senate elections
- 1942 Tennessee gubernatorial election
