= 1938 United States Senate special election in Tennessee =

- November 8, 1938
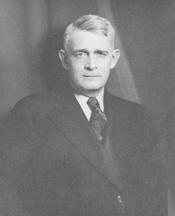

Nominee	Tom Stewart	Harley G. Fowler
Party	Democratic	Republican
Popular vote	194,028	72,098
Percentage	70.50%	26.20%
- County results Stewart: 40–50% 50–60% 60–70% 70–80% 80–90% >90% Fowler: 40–50% 50–60% 60–70% 70–80% 80–90%
Senator before election
George L. Berry
Democratic
Elected Senator
Tom Stewart
Democratic

The 1938 United States Senate special election in Tennessee took place on November 8, 1938, concurrently with other elections to the United States Senate as well as elections to the United States House of Representatives and various state and local elections. The special election came upon the death of incumbent Democratic Senator Nathan L. Bachman who had died in office.

Democratic Governor Gordon Browning appointed George L. Berry after Bachman's death. Berry ran for a full term but was defeated in the Democratic primary to Tom Stewart. In the general election, Tom Stewart defeated Republican candidate Harvey G. Fowler with 70.5% of the vote.

Eligible to begin serving immediately, Tom Stewart instead waited until the expiry of his term as district attorney on January 16, 1939, to take his Senate seat.

== Democratic primary ==
=== Candidates ===
- John Randolph Neal Jr., attorney, law professor, politician, and activist
- John Ridley Mitchell, U.S. Representative from Tennessee's 4th congressional district
- George L. Berry, incumbent senator
- Tom Stewart, district attorney for the 18th Circuit 1923–1939

=== Results ===
Democratic Party primary results
Party	Candidate	Votes	%
Democratic	Tom Stewart	174,940	49.26%
Democratic	George L. Berry (incumbent)	101,966	28.71%
Democratic	John Ridley Mitchell	70,393	19.82%
Democratic	John Randolph Neal Jr.	4,689	1.32%
Democratic	C. L. Powell	3,171	0.89%
Total votes		355,159	100.00%

== Republican primary ==
The Tennessee Republican Party chose to hold a convention instead of a primary election. Harley G. Fowler, a former president of the Tennessee Bar Association, of Knoxville was declared the party's nominee for U.S. Senate by its executive committee.

== General election ==
General election results
Party	Candidate	Votes	%
Democratic	Tom Stewart	194,028	70.50%
Republican	Harley G. Fowler	72,098	26.20%
Independent	John Randolph Neal Jr.	9,106	3.31%
Majority		21,930	44.30%
Turnout		275,232	
Democratic hold			

== See also ==
- 1938 Tennessee gubernatorial election
- 1938 United States Senate elections
