= Tom Stewart (politician) =

American politician (1892–1972)

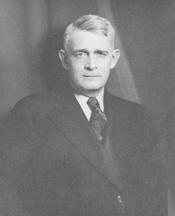
- Photo credited to the United States Senate Historical Office

United States Senator from Tennessee
- In office November 9, 1938 – January 3, 1949
- Preceded by: George L. Berry
- Succeeded by: Estes Kefauver

Personal details
- Born: January 11, 1892 Dunlap, Tennessee, U.S.
- Died: October 10, 1972 (aged 80) Nashville, Tennessee, U.S.
- Party: Democratic

Arthur Thomas Stewart (January 11, 1892 – October 10, 1972) was an American politician. A member of the Democratic, he served as a United States senator from Tennessee from 1938 to 1949. Stewart also served as chief prosecutor in the Scopes trial in 1925.

== Early life and education ==
Stewart was born in Dunlap, Tennessee. Stewart also had a sister called Lydia. He attended the former Pryor Institute, a private school, in Jasper, Tennessee and Emory College (now Emory University). He returned to Tennessee and attended Cumberland University's law school in Lebanon, Tennessee. Upon admission to the bar in 1913, he set up practice in Birmingham, Alabama. He moved back to Jasper, Tennessee in 1915 and practised there until 1919, then moved to Winchester, Tennessee.

== Legal career ==
In private practice in Winchester, he was elected district attorney for the former 18th Circuit for a term beginning in 1923. He served in this position until 1939. As a consequence, in 1925 Stewart was the chief prosecutor in the Scopes Trial. Stewart designed the prosecution's argument to preserve political control over the schools exclusively within the state legislature, thereby keeping the trial to the narrow, legal matters and forestalling attempts by the defense to introduce scientific testimony or to show there was not a conflict between evolution and the story of divine creation set forth in Genesis. Except for the willingness of William Jennings Bryan (hired by a Christian fundamentalist group to assist with the prosecution) to be cross-examined by Clarence Darrow, Stewart's positions controlled the trial and the Scopes defense had no recourse but to ask the jury to convict the defendant so the case could be appealed to the Tennessee Supreme Court (which overturned the conviction on a legal technicality but upheld the constitutionality of the Butler Act).

== Political career ==
In 1938 Stewart entered the race for the balance of the unexpired term of the late Senator Nathan L. Bachman, who had died in office. In the August Democratic primary he defeated labor union leader George L. Berry, who had been appointed to the seat upon Bachman's death by Governor Gordon Browning, and was elected Senator on November 8. Eligible to begin serving immediately, he instead waited until the expiry of his term as district attorney on January 16, 1939 to take his Senate seat.

Stewart was somewhat typical of the Democratic Party's Southern wing of that era. He has been considered to be at least somewhat an ally of Memphis political boss E. H. Crump, but less so than Tennessee's other Senator of the time, Memphian Kenneth McKellar. Unlike some of the other Southern Senators, however, Stewart was also a staunch pro-Roosevelt New Dealer and was the only successful Senator to win a primary and purge an incumbent Senator whom Roosevelt targeted in the 1938 midterm election "purge." Stewart was reelected in 1942. In that year, shortly after the beginning of Japanese internment, he introduced a bill in the Senate to revoke citizenship from all American-born persons of Japanese ancestry. In 1948, he was challenged for renomination by Estes Kefauver, a progressive East Tennessean who defeated him. Edward J. Meeman, the influential editor of the Memphis Press-Scimitar, supported Kefauver to undermine the Crump machine, with which Meeman had long been at odds. After he defeated Stewart, Kefauver then handily prevailed over the Republican nominee, B. Carroll Reece.

Stewart returned to the private practice of law. He died in Nashville and was interred at Winchester's Memorial Park Cemetery.

Party political offices
Preceded by Nathan L. Bachman	Democratic nominee for U.S. Senator from Tennessee (Class 2); 1938, 1942	Succeeded by Estes Kefauver
U.S. Senate
Preceded by George L. Berry	U.S. senator (Class 2) from Tennessee; November 9, 1938 – January 3, 1949; Served alongside: Kenneth McKellar	Succeeded by Estes Kefauver
