= John Ridley Mitchell =

American politician (1877–1962)

Member of the U.S. House of Representatives from Tennessee's 4th district
- In office March 4, 1931 – January 3, 1939
- Preceded by: Cordell Hull
- Succeeded by: Albert Gore, Sr.

Personal details
- Born: September 26, 1877 Livingston, Tennessee
- Died: February 26, 1962 (aged 84) Crossville, Tennessee
- Citizenship: United States
- Party: Democratic
- Spouse: Elmiley Mitchell
- Education: Peabody College of Teachers Cumberland School of Law
- Profession: Attorney; politician; judge

John Ridley Mitchell (September 26, 1877 – February 26, 1962) was an American politician and a U.S. Representative from Tennessee.

== Biography ==
Born in Livingston, Tennessee, Mitchell was the son of Isiah Winburn and Sophrona Winton Mitchell. attended the public schools. He was graduated from Peabody College of Teachers, Nashville, Tennessee, in 1896. He served as Private secretary to Representative C.E. Snodgrass from 1899 to 1903, and graduated from Cumberland School of Law at Cumberland University, Lebanon, Tennessee, in 1904. He was admitted to the bar the same year and commenced practice in Crossville, Tennessee.

== Career ==
A member of the State Democratic executive committee from 1910 to 1914, Mitchell also served as assistant attorney general of the fifth circuit of Tennessee from 1908 to 1918. He became attorney general of the same circuit from 1918 to 1925. He served as judge of the fifth circuit from 1925 until 1931, when he moved to Cookeville, Tennessee.

Mitchell was elected as a Democrat to the Seventy-second and to the three succeeding Congresses (March 4, 1931 – January 3, 1939). He was not a candidate for renomination in 1938, but was unsuccessful for the Democratic nomination for United States Senator and resumed the practice of law. In 1942, Mitchell was a candidate for the Democratic nomination for governor of Tennessee. Mitchell faced incumbent Prentice Cooper and ran a surprisingly strong campaign. He was an attorney in the office of Alien Property Custodian from January 1943 to September 1945. He served as special assistant to Attorney General in the Antitrust Division, at the United States Department of Justice, Washington, D.C., from 1945 to 1951.

== Death ==
Mitchell died in Crossville, Cumberland County, Tennessee, on February 26, 1962 (age 84 years, 153 days). He is interred at Green Acres Memorial Gardens, Crossville, Tennessee.

U.S. House of Representatives
Preceded by Cordell Hull	Member of the U.S. House of Representatives from Tennessee's 4th congressional district March 4, 1931 - January 3, 1939	Succeeded by Albert Gore, Sr.
