= 1948 United States Senate election in New Jersey =

- November 2, 1948
- Turnout: 83% (▲25pp)
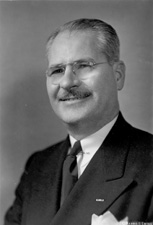

| Nominee | Robert C. Hendrickson | Archibald S. Alexander |
| Party | Republican | Democratic |
| Popular vote | 934,720 | 884,414 |
| Percentage | 49.99% | 47.30% |
- County results Hendrickson: 40–50% 50–60% 60–70% 70–80% Alexander: 40–50% 50–60% 60–70%
U.S. senator before election
Albert Hawkes
Republican
Elected U.S. Senator
Robert C. Hendrickson
Republican

The United States Senate election of 1948 in New Jersey was held on November 2, 1948.

Incumbent Republican Senator Albert Hawkes ran for re-election to a second term but withdrew from the Republican primary after facing overwhelming establishment opposition to his re-election. Republican State Treasurer Robert C. Hendrickson won the primary over Harry Harper and defeated Princeton attorney Archibald S. Alexander in a close general election.

== Republican primary ==
=== Candidates ===
==== Declared ====
- Harry Harper, Commissioner of Labor and Industry and former Major League Baseball pitcher
- Robert C. Hendrickson, New Jersey Treasurer

==== Withdrew ====
- Herbert F. Myers, member of the Hackensack Borough Council
- Albert Hawkes, incumbent Senator since 1943

==== Declined ====
- Alfred E. Driscoll, Governor of New Jersey
- David Van Alstyne, state senator for Bergen County and stockbroker

=== Campaign ===
Senator Hawkes announced his campaign for re-election in December 1947.

By 1948, Governor Alfred E. Driscoll emerged as the dominant force in the New Jersey Republican Party, having successfully reformed the state constitution in 1947 to expand the power of his office, and he sought to put forward a less conservative candidate for the seat in the April primary. In January 1948, Driscoll and other Republican leaders called for Hawkes to end his re-election campaign, arguing that he could not win a second term, and endorsed state senator and wealthy Englewood stockbroker David Van Alstyne for the nomination. In particular, Hawkes's critics pointed to a recent fundraising dinner speech as a fatal political blunder, in which he said, "I have never hated anyone in my life longer than overnight. There is one exception–and he [Franklin D. Roosevelt] lies buried in Hyde Park."

Hawkes responded sharply to the calls for his withdrawal,

"This choice has been made by whipping recalcitrant supporters into line and by utilizing other pressures of power politics–in short, by substituting one-man control for the right of the people to choose their own candidate. We are being treated to the emergence of a Republican oligarchy in New Jersey in which the titular head of the party becomes the state, not the representative of the people in the state."

Soon, it became clear that Van Alstyne would fail to unify the party establishment in opposition to Hawkes. On February 13, state treasurer Robert C. Hendrickson announced his campaign for the seat as a substitute for Van Alstyne, bringing the endorsements of 17 out of 21 county Republican leaders. Hawkes had no institutional support but reiterated that he would remain in the race. Only Bergen County endorsed another candidate, state labor commissioner and native son Harry Harper. Atlantic, Ocean, and Cape May counties remained neutral. Hendrickson, a close political ally of Governor Driscoll, was assured of his support. Nevertheless, Harper refused to withdraw from the race unless Driscoll himself came forward as a candidate.

Hawkes ended his campaign on March 5, 1948, bitterly denouncing Driscoll, whom he compared directly to notorious political bosses Frank Hague and Tom Pendergast, and other party leaders, including his Senate colleague H. Alexander Smith and party chair Lloyd B. Marsh, as "New Deal" Republicans. Hawkes also charged that he had been undermined by a conspiracy among the "South Jersey coalition" and said that he had been advised that his chances of victory were slim, given Driscoll's incredible control over state patronage under the new state constitution enacted in 1947. Driscoll responded that Hawkes's charges were "patently false" and made in "a spirit of jealousy," and denied that geographical considerations had played a role in Hendrickson's selection.

In the days leading up to his withdrawal, Hawkes held several meetings with Harper, who pledged he would remain in the race and sought Hawkes's endorsement.

In protest against pressure from Driscoll to support Hendrickson, Clifford Ross Powell endorsed Harper and submitted his resignation from the New Jersey Army National Guard in order to campaign actively for Harper.

=== Results ===
1948 Republican Senate primary
| Party | Candidate | Votes | % |
|---|---|---|---|
| Republican | Robert C. Hendrickson | 234,113 | 58.14% |
| Republican | Harry Harper | 168,553 | 41.86% |
| Total votes | | 402,666 | 100.00% |

== Democratic primary ==
=== Candidates ===
- Archibald S. Alexander, attorney and Army Lieutenant Colonel (ret.)

==== Withdrew ====
- Frank Kingdon, Newark activist and author

=== Results ===
Alexander was unopposed for the Democratic nomination. Frank Kingdon, the former president of the University of Newark who supported Henry A. Wallace for the presidency, withdrew from the race and left the Democratic Party in protest.

1948 Democratic Senate primary
| Party | Candidate | Votes | % |
|---|---|---|---|
| Democratic | Archibald Alexander | 152,401 | 100.00% |
| Total votes | | 152,401 | 100.00% |

== General election ==
=== Candidates ===
- Archibald S. Alexander (Democrat), attorney and Army Lieutenant Colonel (ret.)
- George E. Bopp (Socialist Labor)
- George Breitman (Socialist Workers), activist and editor of The Militant
- Robert C. Hendrickson (Republican), New Jersey Treasurer
- James Imbrie (Progressive)
- Rubye Smith (Socialist)
- George W. Rideout (Prohibition)

=== Results ===
1948 United States Senate election in New Jersey
| Party | Candidate | Votes | % |
|---|---|---|---|
| Republican | Robert C. Hendrickson | 934,720 | 49.99% |
| Democratic | Archibald S. Alexander | 884,414 | 47.30% |
| Progressive | James Imbrie | 22,658 | 1.21% |
| Socialist | Rubye Smith | 11,450 | 0.61% |
| Socialist Workers | George Breitman | 8,076 | 0.43% |
| Prohibition | George W. Rideout | 4,656 | 0.25% |
| Socialist Labor | George E. Bopp | 3,908 | 0.21% |
| Majority | | 50,306 | 2.69% |
| Turnout | | 1,869,882 | |
| Republican hold | | | |

== See also ==
- 1948 United States Senate elections
