= 1946 United States Senate election in New Jersey =

- November 5, 1946
- Turnout: 67% (▼16pp)
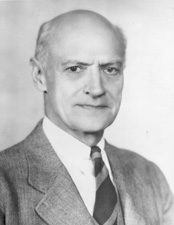

Nominee	H. Alexander Smith	George E. Brunner
Party	Republican	Democratic
Popular vote	799,808	548,458
Percentage	58.50%	40.12%
- County results Smith: 50–60% 60–70% 70–80% 80–90% Brunner: 50–60% 60–70%
Senator before election
H. Alexander Smith
Republican
Elected Senator
H. Alexander Smith
Republican

The 1946 United States Senate election in New Jersey was held on November 5, 1946.

Republican incumbent H. Alexander Smith, who had been elected in a 1944 special election to complete the unexpired term of the late William Warren Barbour, was re-elected over Democrat George Brunner, the mayor of Camden.

As of 2026, this is the most recent time New Jersey held multiple elections for statewide office on the same day; Alfred E. Driscoll was elected governor in a simultaneous election.

== Republican primary ==
=== Candidates ===
- H. Alexander Smith, incumbent Senator since 1944

=== Results ===
Senator Smith was unopposed for re-nomination.

1946 Republican Senate primary
Party	Candidate	Votes	%
Republican	H. Alexander Smith (incumbent)	369,157	100.0%
Total votes		369,157	100.0%

== Democratic primary ==
=== Candidates ===
- George E. Brunner, Mayor of Camden

=== Results ===
1946 Democratic U.S. Senate primary
Party	Candidate	Votes	%
Democratic	George E. Brunner	161,214	100.0%
Total votes		161,214	100.0%

== General election ==
=== Candidates ===
- George Breitman (Socialist Workers), activist and editor of The Militant
- George E. Brunner (Democrat), Mayor of Camden
- John C. Butterworth (Socialist Labor)
- Frederick W. Collins (Anti Medical Trust Federation)
- Mark M. Jones (Independent American)
- George W. Ridout (Prohibition)
- Arthur Riley (Socialist)
- H. Alexander Smith (Republican), incumbent Senator since 1944

=== Results ===
1946 United States Senate election in New Jersey
Party	Candidate	Votes	%
Republican	H. Alexander Smith (incumbent)	799,808	58.50%
Democratic	George E. Brunner	548,458	40.12%
Socialist Labor	John C. Butterworth	7,675	0.56%
Socialist Workers	George Breitman	4,976	0.36%
Socialist	Arthur Riley	2,226	0.16%
Prohibition	George W. Ridout	1,711	0.13%
Anti-Medical Trust Federation	Frederick W. Collins	1,676	0.12%
Independent American	Mark M. Jones	625	0.05%
Majority		251,350	18.38%
Turnout		1,367,155	
Republican hold			

== See also ==
- 1946 United States Senate elections
