= Scotten =

Scotten is an English surname. Notable people with the surname include:

- Hagan Scotten (fl. Since the late 1990s), American attorney
- Robert M. Scotten (1891–1968), American diplomat
- William E. Scotten (1904–1958), American diplomat
