= 1952 United States Senate election in New Jersey =

- November 4, 1952
- Turnout: 89% (▲22pp)
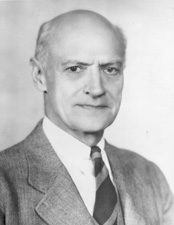

Nominee	H. Alexander Smith	Archibald S. Alexander
Party	Republican	Democratic
Popular vote	1,286,782	1,011,187
Percentage	55.51%	43.62%
- County results Smith: 50–60% 60–70% 70–80% Alexander: 50–60%
Senator before election
H. Alexander Smith
Republican
Elected Senator
H. Alexander Smith
Republican

The United States Senate election of 1952 in New Jersey was held on November 4, 1952.

Incumbent Republican Senator H. Alexander Smith was re-elected to a second term against Undersecretary of the Army Archibald S. Alexander. Both men were residents of Princeton.

As of the 2024 Senate election, this is the last time the Republicans won the Class 1 Senate seat in New Jersey.

== Republican primary ==
=== Candidates ===
==== Declared ====
- Carl E. Ring, candidate for U.S. Representative in 1950
- H. Alexander Smith, incumbent Senator

=== Results ===
1952 Republican Senate primary
Party	Candidate	Votes	%
Republican	H. Alexander Smith (incumbent)	419,376	86.52%
Republican	Carl E. Ring	65,330	13.48%
Total votes		484,706	100.00%

== Democratic primary ==
=== Candidates ===
- Archibald S. Alexander, United States Under Secretary of the Army and nominee for U.S. Senate in 1948

=== Results ===
1952 Democratic Senate primary
Party	Candidate	Votes	%
Democratic	Archibald S. Alexander	194,412	100.00%
Total votes		194,412	100.00%

== General election ==
=== Candidates ===
- Archibald S. Alexander (Democrat), United States Under Secretary of the Army and nominee for U.S. Senate in 1948
- George Breitman (Socialist Workers), activist and editor of The Militant
- Albert Ronis (Socialist Labor)
- H. Alexander Smith (Republican), incumbent Senator
- A. N. Smith (Prohibition)
- Katharine A. Van Orden (Progressive)

=== Results ===
1952 United States Senate election in New Jersey
Party	Candidate	Votes	%
Republican	H. Alexander Smith (Incumbent)	1,286,782	55.51
Democratic	Archibald S. Alexander	1,011,187	43.62
Progressive	Katharine A. Van Orden	7,195	0.31
Prohibition	A. N. Smith	6,815	0.29
Socialist Workers	George Breitman	5,088	0.22
Socialist Labor	Albert Ronis	1,165	0.05
Majority		275,595	11.89
Turnout		2,318,232	
Republican hold			

== See also ==
- 1952 United States Senate elections
