= Archibald S. Alexander =

American lawyer

Treasurer of New Jersey
- In office January 1954 – May 1957
- Governor: Robert B. Meyner
- Preceded by: Aaron Neeld
- Succeeded by: Walter Margetts

United States Under Secretary of the Army
- In office 1950–1952
- President: Harry S. Truman
- Preceded by: Tracy Voorhees
- Succeeded by: Karl R. Bendetsen

Personal details
- Born: Archibald Stevens Alexander; October 28, 1906 New York City, New York, U.S.
- Died: September 4, 1979 (aged 72) Bernardsville, New Jersey, U.S.
- Party: Democratic
- Spouses: Susan Dimock Tilton (m. 1929; died 1935); Jean Struthers Sears (m. 1937)
- Relations: Charles T. Barney (grandfather); Stevens family
- Children: 1
- Parent(s): Archibald Stevens Alexander (father); Helen Tracy Barney
- Education: Princeton University; Harvard Law School

Military service
- Branch/service: United States Army
- Years of service: 1942–1945
- Rank: Lieutenant Colonel

Archibald Stevens Alexander (October 28, 1906 – September 4, 1979) was an American lawyer, civil servant, and Democratic politician. He served as Under Secretary of the United States Army in the Truman Administration and as New Jersey State Treasurer.

== Early life ==
Alexander was born in New York City on October 28, 1906. He was the son of Archibald Stevens Alexander (1880–1912) and Helen Tracy (née Barney) Alexander (1882–1922). From his mother's second marriage to Frederic Newell Watriss, he had a younger half-brother, James Barney Watriss, a horse breeder and aviator.

Through his father, he was a great-grandson of John Stevens, who developed early versions of a screw-propelled steamboat and steam locomotive, and a great-grandson of John Stevens, a delegate in 1784 to the Continental Congress. Through his mother, he was a grandson of Lily (née Whitney) Barney (sister of William Collins Whitney) and Charles T. Barney, the former president of the Knickerbocker Trust Company, and great-grandson of Ashbel H. Barney, president of Wells Fargo & Company and Brig.-Gen. James Scollay Whitney, president of the Metropolitan Steamship Company.

Alexander received a B.A. degree from Princeton University (1928), where he competed in crew, and an LL.B. from Harvard Law School (1931).

== Career ==
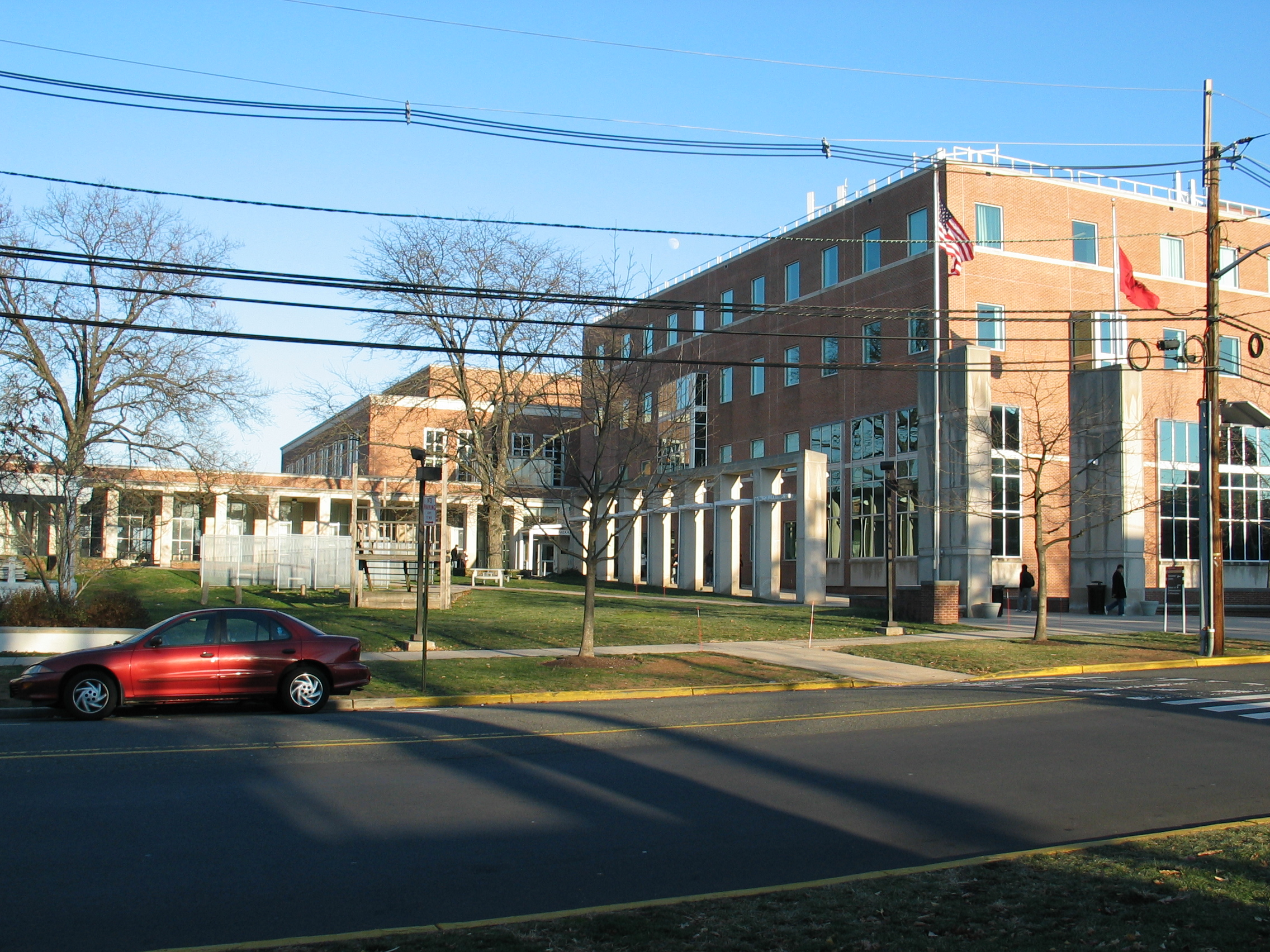
Archibald S. Alexander Library, Rutgers University, New Brunswick, New Jersey

After completing law school Alexander joined the New York firm of Carter, Ledyard & Milburn, where he was a partner from 1940 to 1949. During World War II Alexander served in the United States Army. He was commissioned as first lieutenant in 1942 and served in the European and Mediterranean Theatres. He was discharged from the Army in 1945, having risen to the rank of lieutenant colonel.

=== Political and civic career ===
In 1947 Alexander was appointed to the State Department's Foreign Service Selection Board and served as a consultant to the Atomic Energy Commission on security and personnel matters. He was Assistant Secretary of the Army from 1949 to 1950 and Under Secretary from 1950 to 1952.

Alexander was active in Democratic politics in New Jersey. In 1948 he was the Democratic candidate for United States Senate but lost to Robert C. Hendrickson. He was again the Democratic nominee in 1952, losing to Howard Alexander Smith. From 1954 to 1957 he served as Treasurer of the State of New Jersey. In 1956 he was director of volunteers for the presidential campaign of Adlai Stevenson.

Alexander was president of the Free Europe Committee from 1959 to 1963. In 1963 he was appointed assistant director of the Arms Control and Disarmament Agency, remaining in this position until 1969. From 1971 until his death he was president of the Arms Control Association.

Alexander had a long involvement with Rutgers University. As state treasurer, he was a public member of the university's board of trustees. In 1956 he was appointed to the newly created board of governors for Rutgers and also rejoined the board of trustees, serving on both until 1973. Alexander chaired the board of governors from 1959 to 1963 and again from 1971 to 1973. The central university library is named in his honor.

== Personal life ==
He married Susan Dimock Tilton (1907–1935) in New York City on June 24, 1929. She was a daughter of Benjamin Trowbridge Tilton and Anna Billings (née Griggs) Tilton and her elder sister, Harty Griggs Tilton, was the wife of James Jeremiah Wadsworth, the 4th United States Ambassador to the United Nations. Together, Susan and Archibald were the parents of:

- Archibald Stevens Alexander (1933–2016), a lawyer who taught at Rutgers Law School, where he created a seminar on providing civil legal services to state prison inmates.

After her death in 1935, he married Jean Struthers Sears (1907–1983) at Beverly, Massachusetts, on August 4, 1937; her sister was Emily Sears, who married Henry Cabot Lodge Jr.

Alexander died on September 4, 1979, at his home in Bernardsville, New Jersey, after a short illness.

== Notes ==
Government offices
Preceded by Tracy Voorhees	United States Under Secretary of the Army; 1950-1952	Succeeded by Karl R. Bendetsen
Party political offices
Preceded by William H. Smathers	Democratic Nominee for the U.S. Senate (Class 2) from New Jersey; 1948	Succeeded by Charles R. Howell
Preceded by George E. Brunner	Democratic Nominee for the U.S. Senate (Class 1) from New Jersey; 1952	Succeeded by Harrison A. Williams
