= Dana Library =

Dana Library may refer to:

- John Cotton Dana Library, research library at Rutgers University–Newark, New Jersey
- Dana Library and Research Centre, a section of the Science Museum, London
- Dana Library, a former name of the Cambridge Public Library in Cambridge, Massachusetts
