= George E. Brunner =

American politician

Mayor of Camden, New Jersey
- In office 1936–1959
- Preceded by: Frederick von Nieda
- Succeeded by: Alfred R. Pierce

Personal details
- Born: January 12, 1896 Newark, New Jersey, U.S.
- Died: February 8, 1975 (aged 79) Haddon Township, New Jersey, U.S.
- Party: Democratic

George Edward Brunner (January 12, 1896 – February 8, 1975) was an American Democratic Party politician from New Jersey who served as the Mayor of Camden, New Jersey from 1936 to 1959.

== Biography ==
Brunner was born in 1896 in Newark, New Jersey to Eugene and Bertha (Zehnder) Brunner, both natives of Switzerland. He attended parochial schools in West New York before serving as an apprentice in the plumbing and heating trade. He worked as a journeyman and eventually settled in Camden.

Brunner took an interest in Democratic politics in Camden and in 1931 he was elected to the Camden County Board of Chosen Freeholders. He served until 1935, when he was elected to the Camden City Board of Commissioners as part of a coalition ticket. He became Mayor of Camden, New Jersey that same year when his coalition defeated the Republican organization of the previous mayor, Frederick Von Neida.

Brunner consolidated Democratic power in the city of Camden and its surrounding county, and he would go on to serve six four-year terms as mayor before his organization lost control of the city government in 1959. He was defeated by Alfred R. Pierce and his "Save Our City" ticket, a coalition supported by much of the Hispanic community.

Brunner also became prominent in statewide politics, running unsuccessfully for United States Senate against H. Alexander Smith in 1946 and serving as chairman of the New Jersey Democratic State Committee from 1954 until 1961. He assisted in the careers of two Governors of New Jersey, Robert B. Meyner and Richard J. Hughes, as well as Harrison A. Williams the United States Senator, and William F. Hyland the New Jersey Attorney General.

Brunner died at his home in Haddon Township in 1975 at the age of 79.

Political offices
| Preceded by Frederick Von Neida | Mayor of Camden, New Jersey; 1936 – 1959 | Succeeded by Alfred R. Pierce |
Party political offices
| Preceded by Elmer H. Wene | Democratic Nominee for the U.S. Senate (Class 1) from New Jersey; 1946 | Succeeded by Archibald S. Alexander |
| Preceded by Charles R. Howell | Chairman of the New Jersey Democratic State Committee; 1954 – 1961 | Succeeded by Thorn Lord |
