= Robert C. Hendrickson =

American politician

Robert Clymer Hendrickson
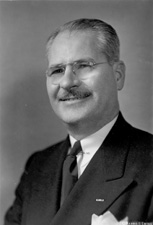

United States Ambassador to New Zealand
- In office February 16, 1955 – November 20, 1956
- President: Dwight D. Eisenhower
- Preceded by: Robert M. Scotten
- Succeeded by: Francis H. Russell

United States Ambassador to Samoa
- In office February 16, 1955 – November 20, 1956
- President: Dwight D. Eisenhower
- Preceded by: Robert M. Scotten
- Succeeded by: Francis H. Russell

United States Senator from New Jersey
- In office January 3, 1949 – January 3, 1955
- Preceded by: Albert W. Hawkes
- Succeeded by: Clifford P. Case

Treasurer of New Jersey
- In office 1942–1949
- Governor: Charles Edison; Walter Evans Edge; Alfred E. Driscoll
- Preceded by: Albert Middleton
- Succeeded by: John J. Dickerson

Member of the New Jersey Senate from Gloucester County
- In office 1934–1940
- Preceded by: William H. Albright
- Succeeded by: Roy V. Wright

Personal details
- Born: August 12, 1898 Woodbury, New Jersey, U.S.
- Died: December 7, 1964 (aged 66) Woodbury, New Jersey, U.S.
- Party: Republican
- Education: Woodbury Junior-Senior High School; Temple University Beasley School of Law

Military service
- Branch/service: United States Army
- Years of service: 1918; 1943-1946; 1951
- Rank: Colonel
- Unit: Fifth Army
- Battles/wars: World War One; Western Front; World War Two; Allied invasion of Italy; Korean War

Robert Clymer Hendrickson Sr. (August 12, 1898 – December 7, 1964) was an American attorney, Republican Party politician, and diplomat who represented New Jersey in the United States Senate from 1949 to 1955. He also served in local and county offices in Gloucester County, which he represented in the New Jersey Senate from 1934 to 1940, and served as New Jersey Treasurer from 1942 to 1949. After his term as United States Senator expired, President Dwight D. Eisenhower appointed him as United States Ambassador to New Zealand and Samoa from 1955 to 1956.

He was a key ally of Governor Alfred E. Driscoll, who managed Hendrickson's campaign for governor in 1940 and supported his campaign for the Senate in 1948. He won the nomination for Senate by gaining establishment support from local and county Republican leaders, which forced incumbent Albert W. Hawkes out of the race ahead of the primary. However, involvement in such intraparty fighting led to his withdrawal from the 1954 campaign, and he was succeeded by Clifford Case.

== Early life, military service and education ==
Robert Clymer Hendrickson was born in Woodbury, New Jersey on August 12, 1898.

He attended Woodbury High School before leaving to enlist in the United States Army in 1918. Since he left for war before his senior year of high school ended, Hendrickson received his diploma while he was deployed in France. While there, he served as an ambulance driver and private.

He graduated from Temple University Law School in 1922. After graduating from law school, Hendrickson was admitted to the New Jersey bar, commencing practice in Woodbury.

== Political and diplomatic career ==
=== State politics ===
Hendrickson was a member of the Gloucester County Board of Chosen Freeholders from 1929 to 1934 and was city solicitor of Woodbury in 1931.

In 1933, he was elected to represent Gloucester County in the New Jersey Senate. He served two three-year terms from 1934 to 1940. He was named vice chair of the Commission on the Delaware River Basin in 1936 and served in that role until 1951. In 1939, he was President of the Senate.

In 1940, Hendrickson ran for governor. He defeated former governor Harold G. Hoffman in the Republican primary but lost the general election to former United States Secretary of the Navy Charles Edison by roughly 64,000 votes out of 1,900,000 cast. His unsuccessful campaign was managed by Camden County senator Alfred E. Driscoll. Although Hendrickson's defeat represented a setback for the Republican Party, which also lost seats in the legislature, it elevated Driscoll to senate majority leader, which he later parlayed into an election as governor himself in 1946.

Also in 1940, Hendrickson became a member of the board of managers of the Council of State Governments, which he chaired in 1941.

==== State treasurer and World War II service ====
Hendrickson was appointed by his opponent, Governor Edison, to serve as state treasurer in 1942. He remained in that office until 1949, serving under two additional governors, Walter E. Edge and Driscoll.

While serving as state treasurer in 1943, Hendrickson rejoined the Army, received a commission as a major, and served as the chief legal officer of the Fifth Army during the Allied invasion of Italy. In that role, he worked on the re-establishment of civil rights and local courts, the implementation of denazification programs, and the care of displaced persons. He left the service as a colonel in 1946. While in the Senate, he was called back into active duty for the Korean War in 1951.

He served on the New Jersey Constitutional Revision Commission.

=== United States Senate ===
In the 1948 United States Senate election, Governor Driscoll and other Republican leaders sought to replace incumbent Albert W. Hawkes with a candidate who was more moderate and ostensibly electable, particularly after Hawkes expressed his "hatred" for the late President Franklin D. Roosevelt at a private fundraiser. After their initial choice, David Van Alstyne, failed to unify establishment support against Hawkes, Hendrickson entered the race on February 13, 1948, with the support of 17 out of 21 county Republican leaders. Hawkes, facing an uphill battle against Driscoll and Hendrickson, ended his campaign on March 5, bitterly denouncing Driscoll, Hendrickson, and the "South Jersey coalition" which had beaten him.

In the April primary, Hendrickson defeated state labor commissioner Harry Harper. In the November general election, he narrowly defeated Archibald S. Alexander, a Princeton attorney with the Wall Street firm of Carter Ledyard & Milburn.

While in the Senate, Hendrickson was one of a few Republicans to oppose Joseph McCarthy of Wisconsin, signing the committee report censuring McCarthy for his conduct. From 1953 to 1955, Hendrickson also headed a subcommittee of the Committee on the Judiciary to study juvenile delinquency; the resulting report was published in 1956 as a book written with investigative journalist Fred J. Cook titled, "Youth in Danger".

=== Ambassador ===
Following his retirement from the Senate in 1955, President Dwight D. Eisenhower appointed Hendrickson as Ambassador to New Zealand and Samoa; he resigned on November 20, 1956, to return to his law practice in Woodbury.

== Personal life and death ==
Hendrickson married Olga Bonsai of Woodbury in 1919. They had at least one son and four daughters and twenty-two grandchildren as of his death in 1964.

Hendrickson died at his home in Woodbury on December 7, 1964, following a major surgery. He was buried in Eglington Cemetery in Clarksboro, New Jersey.

U.S. Senate
Preceded by Albert W. Hawkes	U.S. senator (Class 2) from New Jersey; January 3, 1949 – January 2, 1955; Served alongside: Howard Alexander Smith	Succeeded by Clifford P. Case
Political offices
Preceded by Charles E. Loizeaux	President of the New Jersey Senate; 1939	Succeeded by Arthur F. Foran
Preceded by Albert Middleton	Treasurer of New Jersey; 1942–1949	Succeeded by John J. Dickerson
Party political offices
Preceded by Lester H. Clee	Republican Nominee for Governor of New Jersey; 1940	Succeeded by Walter Evans Edge
Preceded by Albert W. Hawkes	Republican Nominee for the U.S. Senate (Class 2) from New Jersey; 1948	Succeeded by Clifford P. Case
Diplomatic posts
Preceded by Robert M. Scotten	United States Ambassador to New Zealand; February 16, 1955 – November 20, 1956	Succeeded by Francis H. Russell
Preceded by Robert M. Scotten	United States Ambassador to Samoa; February 16, 1955 – November 20, 1956	Succeeded by Francis H. Russell
