= 1938 United States Senate special election in New Jersey =

1938 United States Senate election in New Jersey
- November 8, 1938
- Turnout: 74% (▲3pp)
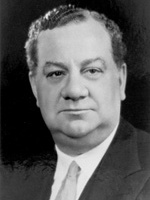

Nominee	William Warren Barbour	William H. J. Ely
Party	Republican	Democratic
Popular vote	816,667	704,159
Percentage	52.98%	45.68%
- County results Barbour: 50–60% 60–70% 70–80% Ely: 50–60% 70–80%
U.S. senator before election
John Gerald Milton
Democratic
Elected U.S. senator
W. Warren Barbour
Republican

The United States Senate special election of 1938 in New Jersey was held on November 8, 1938.

The vacancy was created when incumbent Senator A. Harry Moore resigned to become Governor of New Jersey. Interim appointee John Gerald Milton did not run in the election.

Former Republican U.S. Senator William Warren Barbour returned to the Senate after defeating Democrat William H. J. Ely, the state administrator of the Works Progress Administration.

== Democratic primary ==
=== Candidates ===
- William H. J. Ely, administrator of the New Jersey WPA and former State Senator from Bergen County

=== Results ===
1938 Democratic U.S. Senate special primary
Party	Candidate	Votes	%
Democratic	William H. J. Ely	286,625	100.0%
Total votes		286,625	100.0%

== Republican primary ==
=== Candidates ===
- William Warren Barbour, former U.S. Senator (1931–37)
- C. Dan Coskey, candidate for Senate in 1936
- George O. Pullen, supporter of Francis Townsend

==== Declined ====
- Joseph Frelinghuysen, former U.S. Senator (1917–23) (endorsed Barbour)

=== Results ===
1938 Republican Senate special primary
Party	Candidate	Votes	%
Republican	William Warren Barbour	309,967	89.83%
Republican	George O. Pullen	21,645	6.27%
Republican	C. Dan Coskey	13,444	3.90%
Total votes		345,056	100.00%

== General election ==
=== Candidates ===
- William Warren Barbour (Republican), former U.S. Senator (1931–37)
- John C. Butterworth (Socialist Labor)
- William H. J. Ely (Democrat), administrator of the New Jersey WPA
- Louis H. Kelley (Prohibition)
- William Norman (Communist)
- John Palangio (Socialist)
- Fred Turner (Townsend)

=== Results ===
1938 United States Senate special election in New Jersey
Party	Candidate	Votes	%
Republican	William Warren Barbour	816,667	52.98%
Democratic	William H. J. Ely	704,159	45.68%
Prohibition	Louis H. Kelley	8,201	0.53%
Socialist	John Palangio	3,671	0.24%
Townsend Pension-Labor	Fred Turner	3,521	0.23%
Communist	William Norman	3,515	0.23%
Socialist Labor	John C. Butterworth	1,873	0.12%
Majority		112,508	7.30%
Turnout		1,541,607	
Republican gain from Democratic			

== See also ==
- 1938 United States Senate elections
