= William H. J. Ely =

American politician

Member of the New Jersey Senate from Bergen County
- In office 1932–1935
- Preceded by: Ralph W. Chandless (1930)
- Succeeded by: Winant Van Winkle

Personal details
- Born: September 8, 1891 Rutherford, New Jersey
- Died: March 2, 1942 (aged 50) Rutherford, New Jersey
- Party: Democratic

William Harvey Johnson Ely (September 8, 1891 – March 2, 1942) was an American jurist and Democratic Party politician from New Jersey who served as a State Senator and the state administrator for the Works Progress Administration. He was the Democratic candidate for the United States Senate in 1938.

== Early life and family ==
Ely was born in Rutherford, New Jersey, the son of Captain Addison Ely and Emily Johnson. His father was a leading lawyer and Democratic politician in Rutherford who had moved from Westfield, Massachusetts, where the family had long-standing ties. Ely was the second cousin of Massachusetts Governor Joseph B. Ely, since they shared a great-grandfather, Rev. Elihu Ely (1777-1839), son of Captain Levi Ely (1732-1780).

He attended the University of Michigan and New York University Law School, receiving his LL.B. degree in 1913. He served as a lieutenant in the National Guard on the Mexican border in 1916 and was with the United States Army Motor Transport Corps during World War I. He married Mary E. Rogers of Paterson, New Jersey on April 30, 1917, and they had three sons and two daughters.

== Career ==
In 1924 Ely was named a district judge in the Second Judicial District of Bergen County, and he served on the bench for five years. He began his political career in 1926 as a member of the Rutherford Borough Council. He was elected to the New Jersey Senate in 1931, defeating Harry Harper, becoming the first Democrat from Bergen County to serve in the Senate in sixteen years. He was defeated for reelection in 1934.

In 1935 he was appointed the State WPA Administrator. He resigned two years later to run for the open seat in the United States Senate created by the resignation of A. Harry Moore. In the 1938 election he faced Republican William Warren Barbour, who had served in the Senate from 1931 to 1937. Ely campaigned as a "100 per cent" supporter of the Roosevelt administration. He was seen as in the pocket of notorious political boss Frank Hague of Jersey City, and a few days before the election referred to Hague as "my leader." Ely lost to Barbour by a margin of 112,508 votes.

== Death ==
Ely died at the age of 50 in 1942 at his home in Rutherford after suffering a stroke.

Party political offices
Preceded by A. Harry Moore	Democratic Nominee for the U.S. Senate (Class 1) from New Jersey; 1938	Succeeded by James H. R. Cromwell
