= Senator Van Winkle (disambiguation) =

Peter G. Van Winkle (1808–1872) was a U.S. Senator from West Virginia from 1863 to 1869. Senator Van Winkle may also refer to:

- Kevin Van Winkle (born 1981), Colorado State Senate
- Winant Van Winkle (1879–1943), New Jersey State Senate
