= Francisco Becerra Posada =

Mexican researcher

Francisco Becerra Posada, a Mexican researcher, is the former Assistant Director of the Pan American Health Organization. He has been an advocate for the strengthening of health research and for the use of research for decision making by politicians and donors, with a focus on Latin American countries.

== Education and career ==
Becerra Posada has a doctorate in public health from the National Institute of Public Health in Mexico, a master's in Public Health from Johns Hopkins University (US) and studied medicine at the National Autonomous University of Mexico. His work has given him the opportunity to work and publish with colleagues from Africa, the Americas, Asia, Europe and the Middle East.

He worked as a Head of Projects and Programmes at the Council on Health Research for Development (COHRED). He was also Director General of Health Services of Morelos, Mexico and Deputy Director General of Federal Hospitals of Mexico's Secretariat of Health. He has written many articles on public health and research and contributed to several scientific journals. While in COHRED he was the coordinator of the European Union Framework Programme 7 funded project MASCOT (Multilateral Association for Studying Health inequalities and enhancing North-South and South-South Cooperation), managing a €2 million budget. He also represented COHRED as a partner in the EULAC Health, coordinated by the Carlos III Institute in Madrid, Spain.

Prior to joining COHRED, Dr Becerra Posada worked in several positions at the Secretariat of Health Mexico, as Deputy Director General for Federal Hospitals, Director for Academic Linkage and Dissemination. He has had experience at the Federal, State and local levels. During his Social Service (mandatory for one year) in the Health Center of Comonfort, in the State of Guanajuato, he was named Director and managed to improve services and quality of care, consolidating a working team and making it the center with best financial management. He then got a fellowship from PAHO through the then Pan American Health and Education Foundation to study the MPH at the then called Johns Hopkins School of Hygiene and Public Health in Baltimore, MD.

While at Hopkins, Dr Becerra Posada was President to the Student Assembly, where he coordinated the student body and had an active participation with the School through bringing the public health perspective on key issues such as Apartheid and the Invasion of Grenada by the US. His remarks at the Convocation ceremony in May 1984, brought a personal comment of recognition by Dean DA Henderson. He was also a member of the School's Ethics Committee.

After graduation he traveled through Africa, visiting Morocco, Liberia, Benin, Kenya, and Tanzania. He then worked for Save the Children USA in a refugee cam in Umgargur and Karkora in Sudan with Eritrean refugees, as well as nomads suffering from the 1984 draught in Africa. Here he was the only physician and together with two nurses, detected a cholera epidemic in the camp. They implemented preventive and curative measures and received the support from several organizations (MSF, International Rescue Committee and Oxfam) to alleviate the problem. Finishing his tenure, he returned to Mexico.

In Mexico he was part of a PAHO-Secretariat of Health initiative called Programa Impacto, designed to support the first stage of the decentralization process by then Minister of Health, Dr Guillermo Soberón Acevedo. Dr Becerra Posada was assigned the State of Morelos. The role of the six states consultants was to facilitate the decentralization process and improve communications and coordination between states and federal level. Later he was named Assistant Director for Medical Services of the Morelos State Health Secretariat. He coordinated technical services such as first and second level of care, prevention, epidemiology and health promotion. He was in charge of the state level coordination of the first National Vaccination Day of Mexico, aiming to vaccinate all children on a single day with polio vaccine, a contributing effort to eliminate Polio from the Americas.

As PAHO's Assistant Director he was responsible for the supervision of all technical programs that provide cooperation in public health to the 35 Member States of PAHO, the world's oldest international public health agency. PAHO also serves as the Regional Office for the Americas of the World Health Organization.
