= William H. Smathers =

American politician

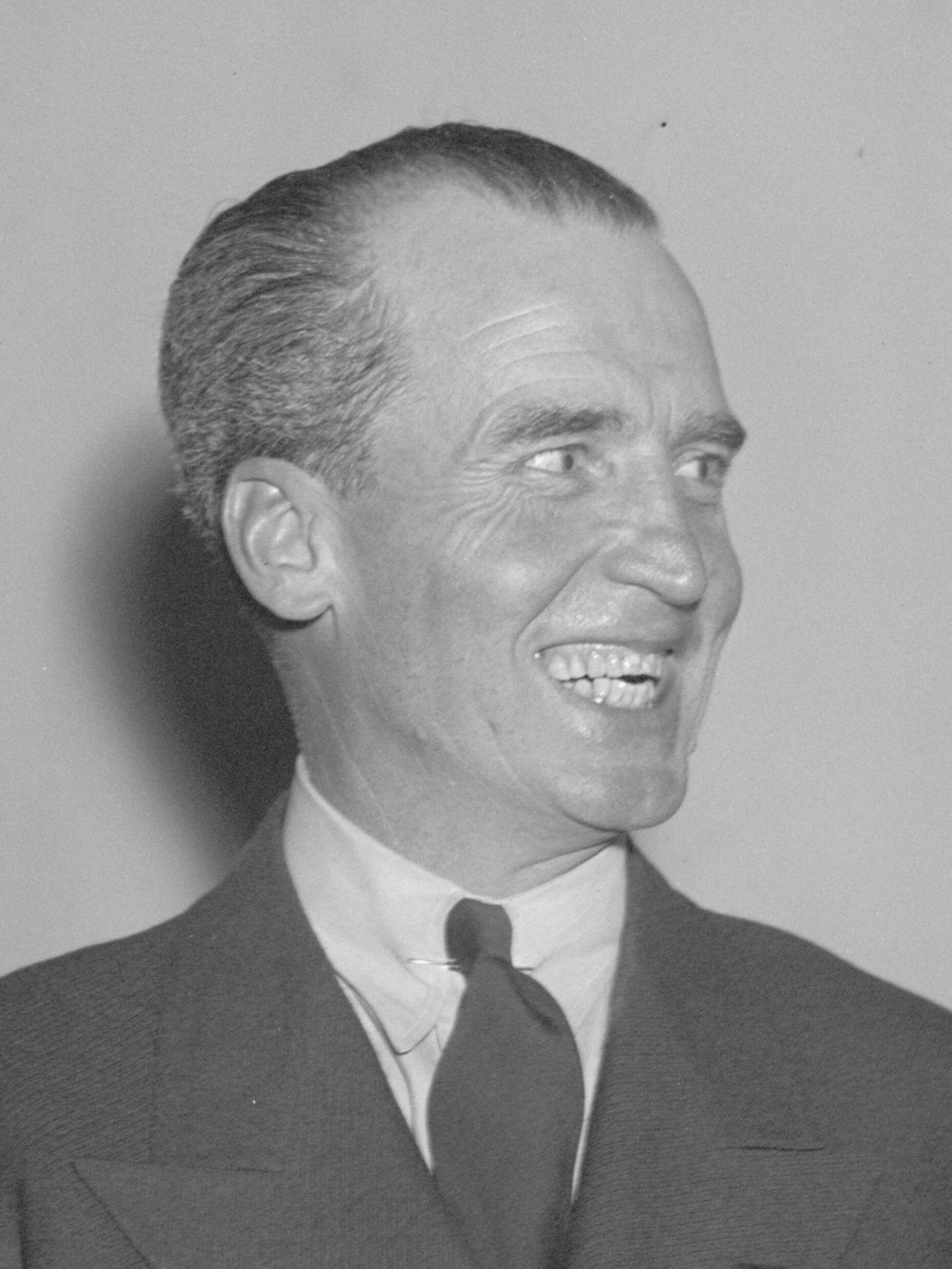
- Smathers in 1937

United States Senator from New Jersey
- In office January 3, 1937 – January 3, 1943
- Preceded by: William W. Barbour
- Succeeded by: Albert W. Hawkes

Member of the New Jersey Senate from Atlantic County
- In office 1935 – April 15, 1937
- Preceded by: Emerson Lewis Richards
- Succeeded by: Thomas D. Taggart

Personal details
- Born: William Howell Smathers; January 7, 1891 Haywood County, North Carolina, U.S.
- Died: September 24, 1955 (aged 64) Asheville, North Carolina, U.S.
- Party: Democratic

William Howell Smathers (January 7, 1891 – September 24, 1955) was a Democratic United States Senator from New Jersey, serving from 1937 to 1943. (Note: He was installed late on April 15, 1937, remaining until then a member of the state Senate, but that does not affect when his service in the U.S. Senate begins, as there is no prohibition in concurrent service in both federal and state legislatures.)

== Biography ==
Smathers was born on January 7, 1891, on a plantation near Waynesville, North Carolina.

He attended public school and Washington and Lee University in Lexington, Virginia. Smathers was graduated from the law department of the University of North Carolina at Chapel Hill in 1911 and was admitted to the bar in 1912, commencing practice in Atlantic City, New Jersey, where he served as a judge of the common pleas court of Atlantic City from 1922 to 1932. Additionally, he served as the first assistant Attorney General of New Jersey, from 1934 to 1936. Smathers was elected to the New Jersey Senate in 1935. He served one term in the U.S. Senate, losing his bid for reelection in 1942. He returned to his law practice in Atlantic City until his retirement to Waynesville.

He died on September 24, 1955, in Asheville, North Carolina.

== Legacy ==
He was the uncle of Florida Senator George Smathers.

== Notes ==
Party political offices
Preceded by Percy H. Stewart	Democratic Nominee for the U.S. Senate (Class 2) from New Jersey; 1936, 1942	Succeeded by Archibald S. Alexander
U.S. Senate
Preceded by W. Warren Barbour	U.S. senator (Class 2) from New Jersey; January 3, 1937 – January 3, 1943; Served alongside: A. Harry Moore, John G. Milton, W. Warren Barbour	Succeeded by Albert W. Hawkes
