= Alistair Cooke =

British-American journalist and broadcaster (1908–2004)

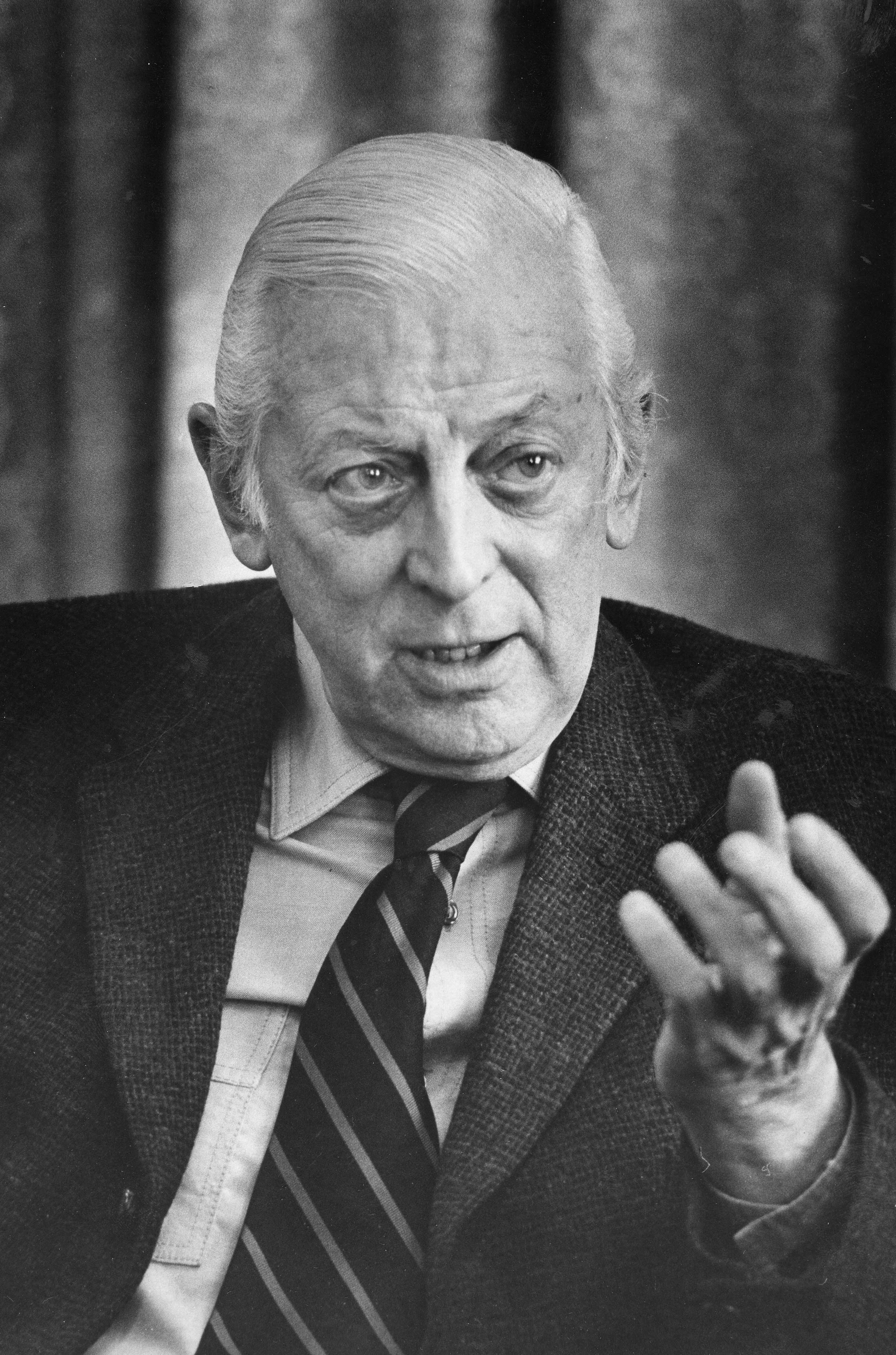
- Cooke during an interview in 1974
- Born: Alfred Cooke; 20 November 1908; Salford, Lancashire, England
- Died: 30 March 2004 (aged 95); New York City, US
- Citizenship: United Kingdom (until 1941); United States (from 1941)
- Education: Jesus College, Cambridge; Yale University; Harvard University
- Occupations: Journalist; broadcaster
- Notable credits: Letter from America; America: A Personal History of the United States
- Spouses: Ruth Emerson (m. 1934; div. 1944); Jane White Hawkes (m. 1946)
- Children: 2, including John Byrne
- Awards: Honorary Knight Commander of the Order of the British Empire

Alistair Cooke, KBE (né Alfred Cooke; 20 November 1908 – 30 March 2004) was a British-American writer whose work as a journalist, television personality and radio broadcaster was done primarily in the United States. Outside his journalistic output, which included Letter from America and America: A Personal History of the United States, he was well known in the United States as the host of PBS Masterpiece Theatre from 1971 to 1992. After holding the job for 22 years, and having worked in television for 42 years, Cooke retired in 1992, although he continued to present Letter from America until shortly before his death. He is the father of author and folk singer John Byrne Cooke.

== Early life ==
He was born Alfred Cooke in Salford, Lancashire, England, the son of Mary Elizabeth (Byrne) and Samuel Cooke. His father was a Methodist lay preacher and metalsmith by trade; his mother's family were of Irish Protestant origin.

He was educated at Blackpool Grammar School, and won a scholarship to Jesus College, Cambridge, where he gained an honours degree (2:1) in English. He was heavily involved in the arts, was editor of Granta, and set up the Mummers, Cambridge's first theatre group open to both sexes, from which he notably rejected a young James Mason, telling him to stick to architecture.

Cooke changed his name to Alistair when he was 22, in 1930.

== Career ==
=== Media beginnings ===
Cooke's first visit to the United States was in 1932 on a two-year Commonwealth Fund Fellowship (now Harkness Fellowship) to Yale and Harvard, where his acting and music skills came to the fore with visits to Hollywood.

Cooke saw a newspaper headline stating that Oliver Baldwin, the Prime Minister Stanley Baldwin's son, had been sacked by the BBC as film critic. Cooke sent a telegram to the Director of Talks, asking if he would be considered for the post. He was invited for an interview and took a Cunard liner back to Britain, arriving twenty-four hours late for his interview. He suggested typing out a film review on the spot, and a few minutes later, he was offered the job, which he took over on 8 October 1934 and gave his first BBC broadcast: "I declare that I am a critic trying to interest a lot of people into seeing interesting films", he told his audience. "I have no personal interest in any company. As a critic I am without politics and without class." He sat on a BBC Advisory Committee headed by George Bernard Shaw for correct pronunciation.

In 1935, Cooke also became London Correspondent for NBC. Each week, he recorded a 15-minute radio dialogue for American listeners on life in Britain, under the series title of London Letter. In 1936, he intensively reported on the Edward VIII abdication crisis for NBC. He delivered several talks on the topic each day to listeners in many parts of the United States. He calculated that in ten days he spoke 400,000 words on the subject. During the crisis, he was aided by a twenty-year-old Rhodes Scholar, Walt Rostow, who would become Lyndon B. Johnson's national security advisor.

=== Move to the United States ===
Cooke stated that, on a visit to New York in 1936, he had been impressed at how freely newspapers and journals were able to report on the abdication crisis whilst all comment was still censored in London. Very soon, in 1937, he immigrated. He became a United States citizen and swore the Oath of Allegiance on 1 December 1941, six days before Pearl Harbor was attacked. Shortly after immigrating, Cooke suggested to the BBC the idea of doing the London Letter in reverse: a 15-minute talk for British listeners on life in America. A prototype, Mainly About Manhattan, was broadcast intermittently from 1938, but the idea was shelved with the outbreak of World War II in 1939.

During this time, as well, Cooke undertook a journey through the whole United States, recording the lifestyle of ordinary Americans during the war and their reactions to it. The manuscript was published as The American Home Front: 1941–1942 in the United States (and as Alistair Cooke's American Journey: Life on the Home Front in the Second World War in the UK) in 2006.

The first American Letter was broadcast on 24 March 1946 (Cooke said this was at the request of Lindsey Wellington, the BBC's New York Controller); the series was initially commissioned for only 13 instalments. The series came to an end 58 years later in March 2004, after 2,869 instalments and less than a month before Cooke's death. Along the way, it picked up a new name (changing from American Letter to Letter from America in 1950) and an enormous audience, being broadcast not only in Britain and in many other Commonwealth countries, but throughout the world by the BBC World Service.

=== Journalist ===
In 1947, Cooke became a foreign correspondent for the Manchester Guardian newspaper (later The Guardian), for which he wrote until 1972. It was the first time he had been employed as a staff reporter; all his previous work had been freelance.

In reporting on the Montgomery bus boycott, begun by Rosa Parks and led by Martin Luther King, Cooke expressed sympathy for the economic costs imposed on the city bus company and referred to Mrs. Parks as "the stubborn woman who started it all ... to become the Paul Revere of the boycott." Martin Luther King complained about Cooke's "biased and hostile reports", which motivated philosopher Michael Dummett to write his own refuting report, which The Guardian refused to publish.

In 1968, while living in San Francisco, Cooke was near Sirhan Sirhan and later, only yards away from Robert F. Kennedy when he was assassinated, witnessing the events that followed.

=== Omnibus ===
In 1952, Cooke became the host of CBS's Omnibus, the first U.S. commercial network television series devoted to the arts. It featured appearances by such personalities as Hume Cronyn, Jessica Tandy, Gene Kelly and Leonard Bernstein. Jonathan Winters was the first comic to appear on the show.

=== Mid to later years ===
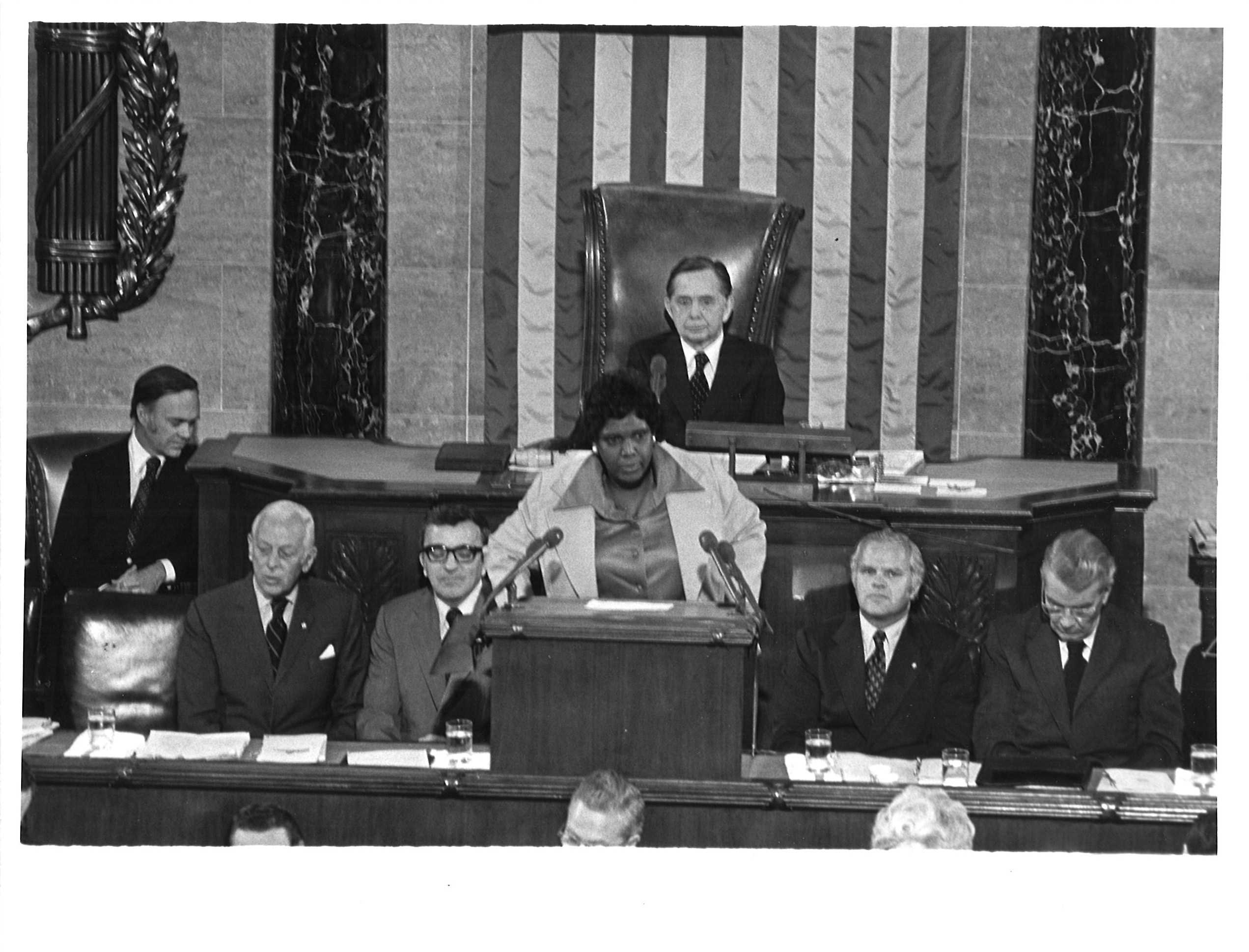
Alistair Cooke (front row, left) at the bicentennial of the First Continental Congress, September 25, 1974; Barbara Jordan addresses the joint Houses of Congress.

In 1966 he was invited to deliver the MacMillan Memorial Lecture to the Institution of Engineers and Shipbuilders in Scotland. He chose the subject "The Jet Age and the Habits of Man".

In 1971, he became the host of the new Masterpiece Theatre, PBS's showcase of quality British television. He presented several shows for the program including The Moonstone (1972), Strangers and Brothers (1984), The Bretts (1987-1989), and many others. He remained its host for 22 years, before retiring from the role in 1992.

He achieved his greatest popularity in the United States in this role, becoming the subject of many parodies, including "Alistair Cookie" in Sesame Street ("Alistair Cookie" was also the name of a clay animated cookie-headed spoof character created by Will Vinton as the host of a video trailer for The Little Prince and Friends), and Alistair Quince, portrayed by Harvey Korman, who introduced many episodes in the early seasons of Mama's Family.

America: A Personal History of the United States (1972), a 13-part television series about the United States and its history, was first broadcast in both the United Kingdom and the United States in 1973, and was followed by a book of the same title. It was a great success in both countries, and resulted in Cooke's being invited to address the joint Houses of the United States Congress as part of Congress's bicentenary celebrations. After the series was broadcast in Ireland, Cooke won a Jacob's Award, one of the few occasions when this award was made to the maker of an imported programme.

=== Final years ===
On 2 March 2004, at the age of 95, following advice from his doctors, Cooke announced his retirement from Letter from America—after 58 years, the longest-running speech radio show in the world.

Cooke died at midnight on 30 March 2004, at his home in New York City. He had been ill with heart disease, but he died of lung cancer, which had spread to his bones. He was cremated, and his ashes were clandestinely scattered by his family in Central Park.

=== Theft of bones ===
On 22 December 2005, the New York Daily News reported that several of Cooke's bones, and those of many other people, had been surgically removed before cremation by employees of Biomedical Tissue Services of Fort Lee, New Jersey, a tissue-recovery firm. The thieves sold the bones for use as medical-grade bone grafts. The cancer from which Cooke was suffering had spread to his bones, making them unsuitable for grafts. Reports indicated the people involved in selling the bones altered his death certificate to hide the cause of death and reduce his age from 95 to 85. Michael Mastromarino, a former New Jersey–based oral surgeon, and Lee Cruceta agreed to a deal that resulted in their imprisonment. Mastromarino was sentenced on 27 June 2008, in the New York Supreme Court, to 18 to 54 years' imprisonment. The entire story of the theft was featured in a documentary aimed at educating the public about modern-day grave robbery. On the morning of 7 July 2013, at the age of 49, Michael Mastromarino died at St. Luke's Hospital, having been suffering from liver cancer.

== Personal life ==
=== Marriages and children ===
In 1932, Cooke became engaged to Henrietta Riddle, the daughter of the English actor Henry Ainley and the Baroness von Hütten, but she broke off the engagement the following year, while he was in America on a Commonwealth Fund Fellowship. He met Ruth Emerson, a great-grandniece of Ralph Waldo Emerson, in 1933, and they married on 24 August 1934. Their son, John Byrne Cooke, was born on 5 October 1940 in New York City, New York.

Alistair Cooke divorced Ruth in 1944, and married Jane White Hawkes, a portrait painter and the widow of neurologist A. Whitfield Hawkes, the son of Albert W. Hawkes, on 30 April 1946. Their daughter, Susan, was born on 22 March 1949.

=== Recreation and interests ===
Cooke took up golf in his mid-fifties, developing a fascination with the game, despite never attaining an extraordinary level of skill. He was driven by his love of golf to devote many of his Letter from America episodes to the topic, speaking once of the thrill of learning "how much more awesome was the world of golf than the world of politics." Cooke became close friends with many of the leading golfers of the era: Jack Nicklaus, in the introduction to a compilation of Cooke's writing on golf, recounts his many notable achievements, but describes him as "most of all ... a friend".

== Honours and awards ==
In 1973, Cooke was awarded an honorary knighthood (KBE) for his "outstanding contribution to Anglo-American mutual understanding". Cooke was reportedly happy to accept, because in the words of Thomas Jefferson, it did not involve "the very great vanity of a title." Having relinquished his British citizenship during World War II, he could not be called "Sir Alistair".

After Cooke's death, the Fulbright Alistair Cooke Award in Journalism was established as a tribute to the man and his life and career achievements. The award supports students from the United Kingdom to undertake studies in the United States, and for Americans to study in the United Kingdom.

== Bibliography ==
- (As editor). Garbo and the Night Watchmen: A Selection from the Writings of British and American Film Critics (1937). London: Jonathan Cape. OCLC 475654840.
- (As editor). Garbo and the Night Watchmen: A Selection Made in 1937 from the Writings of British and American Film Critics (1971). London: Secker & Warburg. ISBN 0-436-10665-5. OCLC 490094134. Reprinted.
- Douglas Fairbanks: The Making of a Screen Character (1940)
- A Generation on Trial: The USA v. Alger Hiss (1950). Alfred A. Knopf (1982). ISBN 0-313-23373-X.
- Mencken (1955)
- A William March Omnibus: with an introduction by Alistair Cooke (1956)
- (As editor). The Bedside Guardian 8: A Selection from the Manchester Guardian 1958-1959 (1959)
- Around the World in Fifty Years: A Political Travelogue (1966). Field Enterprises Educational Corporation. ASIN B0000CN5PS.
- The Patient Has the Floor (1986). ISBN 1-55504-214-7.
- Six Men (1977). The Bodley Head. ISBN 0-370-30056-4. (1995). ISBN 1-55970-317-2.
- Fun & Games with Alistair Cooke: On Sport and Other Amusements (1996). ISBN 1-55970-327-X.
- Memories of the Great and the Good (2000). ISBN 1-55970-545-0.
- The American Home Front: 1941–1942 (2006). ISBN 0-87113-939-1.
- Alistair Cooke's American Journey: Life on the Home Front in the Second World War (2006). ISBN 0-7139-9879-2.

=== "America" books ===
- Letters from America (1951). Rupert Hart-Davis, London – with introduction "To the British Reader"
- One Man's America (1952). Alfred A Knopf, New York – same chapters as 'Letters from America' (1951), with introduction "To the American Reader"
- Talk about America: Letters from America, 1951–1968 (1968). The Bodley Head (1981), Penguin Books. ISBN 0-14-005764-1.
- Letter from America: The Early Years, 1946–1968
- Alistair Cooke's America (22 November 1973). BBC Books, London. ISBN 0-563-12182-3 (13 November 2003). Phoenix. ISBN 1-84188-229-1. – updated edition with new introduction and final chapter written by Alistair Cooke
- The Americans: Fifty Talks on our Lives and Times, 1969–1979 (Nov. 1979). Alfred A Knopf, New York. ISBN 0-394-50364-3.
- America Observed: The Newspaper Years of Alistair Cooke/selected and edited by Ronald A. Wells (1988) Penguin. ISBN 0-14-011509-9.
- Letters from America: The Americans, Letters from America and Talk About America
- Letter from America: (1946–2004) (2004). ISBN 1-4000-4402-2.
- The Marvelous Mania: Alistair Cooke on Golf (2007). ISBN 978-0-7139-9996-9.
- Reporting America: The Life of the Nation, 1946–2004. Allen Lane. 2008. ISBN 978-1-84614-047-1.
  - Review: Saunders, Alan (March 2009). "Last Man Standing". The Monthly. 43: 50–52. Review of Reporting America: The Life of the Nation, 1946–2004.

=== Biography ===
- Alistair Cooke: The biography by Nick Clarke (1999). ISBN 0-297-64378-9.

== Media ==
- America: A Personal History of the United States has been released on DVD, with an additional feature where Cooke talks about his life.
- An Evening With Alistair Cooke at the Piano, an LP record first released in 1955, later re-released in 1973 by Columbia Special Products (catalogue number B00110SXCK).

The album features Cooke playing jazz standards on piano with accompanying whistle and speaking about his life in America.

Preceded by none	Host of Masterpiece Theatre; 1971–1992	Succeeded by Russell Baker
