= Save the Children USA =

American humanitarian organization

- Founded: 1932
- Founder: John Voris; Frank Kingdon
- Type: NGO
- Location: 501 Kings Highway East, Suite 400, Fairfield, Connecticut 06825, United States
- Region served: United States and Worldwide
- Key people: Janti Soeripto (President & CEO)
- Website: www.savethechildren.org

Save the Children Federation, Inc., more commonly known as Save the Children USA, is a non-profit organization in the United States. Its stated goal is to improve the lives of children in the U.S. and around the world. Its headquarters is in Fairfield, Connecticut.

The organization was established in 1932 by two East Coast clergymen, Dr. John Voris and Dr. Frank Kingdon, to help children in the Appalachian Mountains during the Great Depression. It was modeled on the Save the Children Fund which had been established in Britain in 1919.

Save the Children USA is part of Save the Children International, which operates in over 120 countries. It was rated 4-stars by the Charity Navigator from 2001 to 2014, 3-stars from 2015 to 2017, and 4-stars in 2018 and 2019.

== Global operations ==
Save the Children operates internationally to respond to global emergencies and conflicts which affect children. The organization claims to be capable of assembling a team of skilled health professionals anywhere in the world within 72 hours of a crisis.

The charity works in over 200 of the poorest communities in rural America. Programs are focused on ensuring children are kindergarten-ready, reading by third grade, have safe places to go after school, and maintain reading and math skills over the summer. It also provides relief for natural disasters in the U.S.

Internationally, Save the Children has significant presence in Yemen, Syria, Bangladesh, and on both sides of the U.S. Southern border. It also provided international relief during the COVID-19 pandemic.

== Ambassadors ==
Save the Children identifies its ambassadors as high-profile individuals that are widely-recognized as prominent members of their field and demonstrate a commitment to the organization's mission. Ambassadors promote the organization's work, raise funds, and advocate to create lasting change for children in need. As of July 2023, ambassadors for the organization include Camila Cabello, Dakota Fanning, Jennifer Garner, Enrique Iglesias, and Olivia Wilde.

== Research papers ==
As part of its advocacy role, Save the Children USA commissions research to support its mission. Amongst the reports are a 2016 paper on International Development and Early Learning Assessment (IDELA), a method for direct assessment of child development. Stop the War reports, which discuss war crimes against children, were published in 2019, 2020, and 2021. The organization also published a report on how COVID-19 has affected children's lives.

Save the Children USA published an annual End of Childhood Report and an End of Childhood Index that evaluates countries against a common set of life-changing events which can signal the disruption of childhood.

== Controversies ==
=== Sponsorship scandal ===
In March 1998, the Chicago Tribune reported that the organization had mishandled donation funds; The investigation revealed that two dozen donors were making contributions to sponsor dead children. In one instance, an American family with the surname "Dixon" had been sending $20/month to a child by the name of Abdoul Kone who died in a donkey cart accident nearly 3 years prior. The scandal resulted in the dismissal of a Mali-based employee. Three additional employees were reprimanded for allowing the deaths to go unreported.

=== Traces of lead in mugs ===
In October 1998, Save the Children USA recalled approximately 2,000 mugs when it was revealed that their lead content, while in compliance with Federal guidelines, exceeded the levels of a voluntary standard to be instituted in California the following year.

=== QAnon attempt to co-opt #SaveTheChildren ===
In 2020 proponents of the unproven far-right conspiracy theory QAnon attempted to co-opt the hashtag #SaveTheChildren, leading to a temporary block of the hashtag on Facebook. On August 7, Save the Children issued a statement on the unauthorized use of its name in campaigns.
