= Jane White Cooke =

American painter

- Born: Frances Jane White; January 10, 1913; Montclair, New Jersey, United States
- Died: May 8, 2011 (aged 98); Shelburne, Vermont, United States
- Occupation: Painter

Jane White Cooke (January 10, 1913 – May 8, 2011) was an American portrait painter.

Cooke was born Frances Jane White in Montclair, New Jersey on January 10, 1913. She attended the National Academy of Design, where she was awarded several prizes (alongside classmate and friend Robert McCloskey), including a traveling scholarship to study in Europe. In 1937, she married A. Whitfield Hawkes, son of Albert W. Hawkes who later served in the U.S. Senate, but her husband, a neurologist, died in the South Pacific in late 1943. In 1946 she remarried to journalist and broadcaster Alistair Cooke, a marriage that lasted until his death in 2004.

She was interested in art from an early age, and as an adult created hundreds of paintings, mostly portraits and also still lifes and landscapes, including of the north fork of Long Island. Her portraits of Nathan Milstein and Alistair Cooke are in the collection of the National Portrait Gallery in Washington, DC. she died in 2011 at 98.
