= 1942 United States Senate election in New Jersey =

- November 3, 1942
- Turnout: 58% (▼27pp)
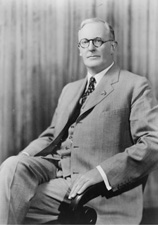

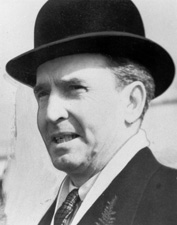
Nominee	Albert Hawkes	William Smathers
Party	Republican	Democratic
Popular vote	648,855	559,851
Percentage	53.09%	45.81%
- County results Hawkes: 50–60% 60–70% 70–80% Smathers: 50–60% 70–80%
Senator before election
William Smathers
Democratic
Elected Senator
Albert Hawkes
Republican

The United States Senate election of 1942 in New Jersey was held on November 3, 1942. Incumbent Democratic Senator William Smathers ran for re-election to a second term, but was defeated by Republican businessman Albert Hawkes.

As of 2026, this is the last time an incumbent U.S. Senator from New Jersey lost re-election, although in 2002 incumbent Senator Robert Torricelli dropped out in late September while trailing in the polls.

== Democratic primary ==
=== Candidates ===
- William Smathers, incumbent Senator

=== Results ===
Senator Smathers was unopposed for re-nomination.

1942 Democratic Senate primary
Party	Candidate	Votes	%
Democratic	William Smathers (incumbent)	170,621	100.00%
Total votes		170,621	100.00%

== Republican primary ==
=== Candidates ===
==== Declared ====
- George Biehl
- Joseph A. Bower, banker and treasurer of the Republican State Committee
- Albert Hawkes, director of the United States Chamber of Commerce
- Franklin W. Kielb, attorney from North Plainfield
- George O. Pullen, candidate for Senate in 1938 and 1940
- Gill Robb Wilson, Presbyterian minister and founder of the Civil Air Patrol

=== Results ===
1942 Republican Senate primary
Party	Candidate	Votes	%
Republican	Albert W. Hawkes	130,885	43.97%
Republican	Gill Robb Wilson	127,390	42.80%
Republican	Joseph A. Bower	16,097	5.41%
Republican	George Biehl	11,588	3.89%
Republican	George O. Pullen	6,311	2.12%
Republican	Franklin W. Kielb	5,384	1.81%
Total votes		297,655	100.00%

== General election ==
=== Candidates ===
- Elmo L. Bateman (Prohibition)
- William L. Becker (Socialist)
- George Breitman (Socialist Workers), activist and editor of The Militant
- John C. Butterworth (Socialist Labor)
- Lorenzo Harris (Progressive Independent)
- Albert W. Hawkes (Republican), director of the United States Chamber of Commerce
- William H. Smathers (Democrat), incumbent Senator since 1937

=== Results ===
1942 United States Senate election in New Jersey
Party	Candidate	Votes	%
Republican	Albert W. Hawkes	648,855	53.09%
Democratic	William H. Smathers (incumbent)	559,851	45.81%
Socialist	William L. Becker	6,775	0.55%
Independent Progressive	Lorenzo Harris	3,224	0.26%
Prohibition	Elmo L. Bateman	1,438	0.12%
Socialist Labor	John C. Butterworth	1,310	0.11%
Socialist Workers	George Breitman	679	0.06%
Majority		89,004	7.28%
Turnout		1,222,132	
Republican gain from Democratic			

== See also ==
- 1942 United States Senate elections
