= Archibald S. Alexander Library =

Coordinates: 40.504649°N 74.452597°W

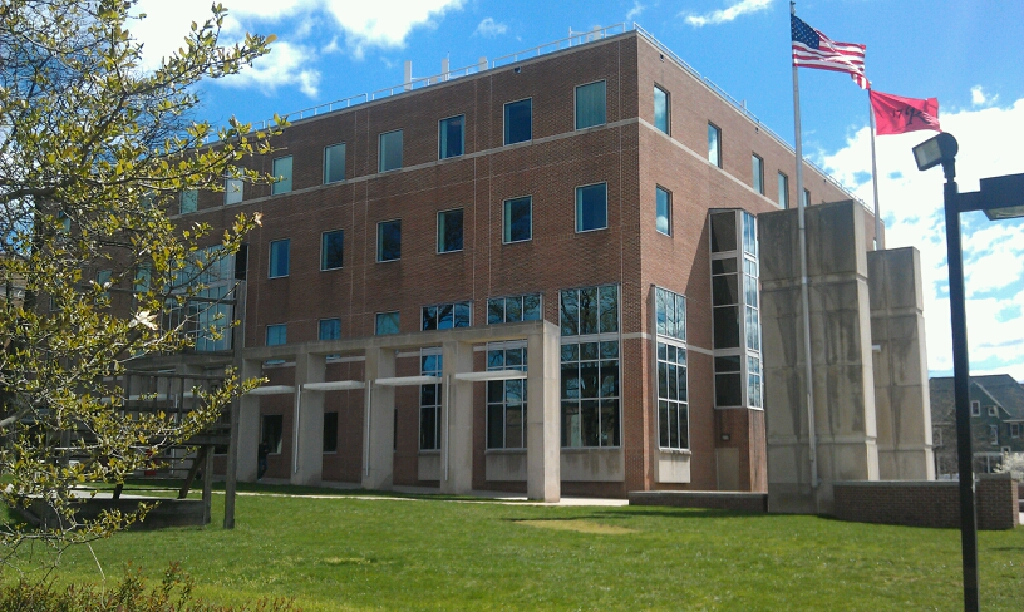
- Type: Public
- Established: 1956
- Location: 169 College Avenue, New Brunswick, New Jersey, USA
- Campus: Rutgers University–New Brunswick
- Website: www.libraries.rutgers.edu/alexander

Archibald S. Alexander Library is the oldest and main university library for Rutgers University–New Brunswick. It houses an extensive humanities and social science collection and also supports the work of faculty and staff at four professional schools: the Edward J. Bloustein School of Planning and Public Policy, the Graduate School of Education, the Graduate School of Social Work, and the School of Communication and Information. In addition, Alexander supports major interdisciplinary programs in African studies, Latin American studies, medieval studies, and South Asian Studies.

The Alexander Library is also a Federal Depository Library, maintaining a large collection of government documents, which contains United States, New Jersey, foreign, and international government publications.

The library is named after Archibald S. Alexander, an American lawyer, civil servant, and politician who was for several years on the university's board of trustees.

== History ==
Construction for the library began in 1953. The building was originally designed to house one-half million books and 12,000 people. Alexander became the main library of Rutgers University when it opened in 1956, replacing Voorhees Hall.

The library was awarded $16 million in funds for renovations and expansion in 1988. The Scholarly Communication Center (SCC) was one of the additions made from this project. Rutgers librarians created the initial concept for the SCC.

From 2011 to 2013, the library housed the a cafe known as the "Scarlet Latte Cafe". The cafe closed due to low sales and was replaced by vending machines for food and drinks.

== Special collections ==
The library contains the diary of Dinah Van Bergh, who was wife to the founder of Rutgers University (originally known as Queen's College). Jacob Rutsen Hardenbergh, Rutger's founder, married Dinah Van Bergh on 18 March 1756 at Raritan, New Jersey. Born in Amsterdam, Dinah was the daughter of Louis Van Bergh, a wealthy merchant who was "engaged in East India trade." Her diary, dating from February 1746 to late 1747, is held by Special Collections and University Archives, at the Archibald S. Alexander Library.

== See also ==
- John Cotton Dana Library
