= 1940 New Jersey gubernatorial election =

- November 5, 1940
- Turnout: 85.52% (▲15.32%)
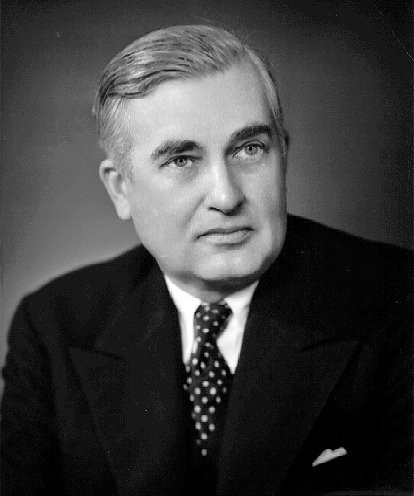

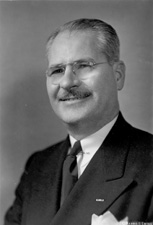
Nominee	Charles Edison	Robert C. Hendrickson
Party	Democratic	Republican
Popular vote	984,407	920,512
Percentage	51.38%	48.04%
- County results Edison: 50–60% 60–70% Hendrickson: 40–50% 50–60% 60–70%
Governor before election
A. Harry Moore
Democratic
Elected Governor
Charles Edison
Democratic

The 1940 New Jersey gubernatorial election was held on November 5, 1940. Democratic nominee Charles Edison defeated Republican nominee Robert C. Hendrickson with 51.38% of the vote.

== Primary elections ==
Primary elections were held on May 21, 1940.

=== Democratic primary ===
==== Candidates ====
- Charles Edison, former United States Secretary of the Navy

==== Results ====
Democratic primary results
Party	Candidate	Votes	%
Democratic	Charles Edison	257,008	100.00
Total votes		257,008	100.00

=== Republican primary ===
==== Candidates ====
- Robert C. Hendrickson, State Senator for Gloucester County from Woodbury
- Harold G. Hoffman, former Governor

==== Results ====
Republican Party primary results
Party	Candidate	Votes	%
Republican	Robert C. Hendrickson	283,942	53.46
Republican	Harold G. Hoffman	247,221	46.54
Total votes		531,163	100.00

== General election ==
=== Candidates ===
Major party candidates

- Charles Edison, Democratic
- Robert C. Hendrickson, Republican

Other candidates

- Marion Douglas, Socialist Party of America
- Manuel Cantor, Communist Party USA
- John C. Butterworth, Socialist Labor Party of America
- Elmo L. Bateman, Prohibition Party

=== Results ===
New Jersey gubernatorial election, 1940
Party	Candidate	Votes	%	±%
Democratic	Charles Edison	984,407	51.38%	
Republican	Robert C. Hendrickson	920,512	48.04%	
Socialist	Marion Douglas	7,607	0.40%	
Communist	Manuel Cantor	1,544	0.08%	
Socialist Labor	John C. Butterworth	1,411	0.07%	
Prohibition	Elmo L. Bateman	584	0.03%	
Majority				
Turnout				
Democratic hold		Swing		
