= 1936 United States Senate election in New Jersey =

- November 3, 1936
- Turnout: 85% (▲2pp)
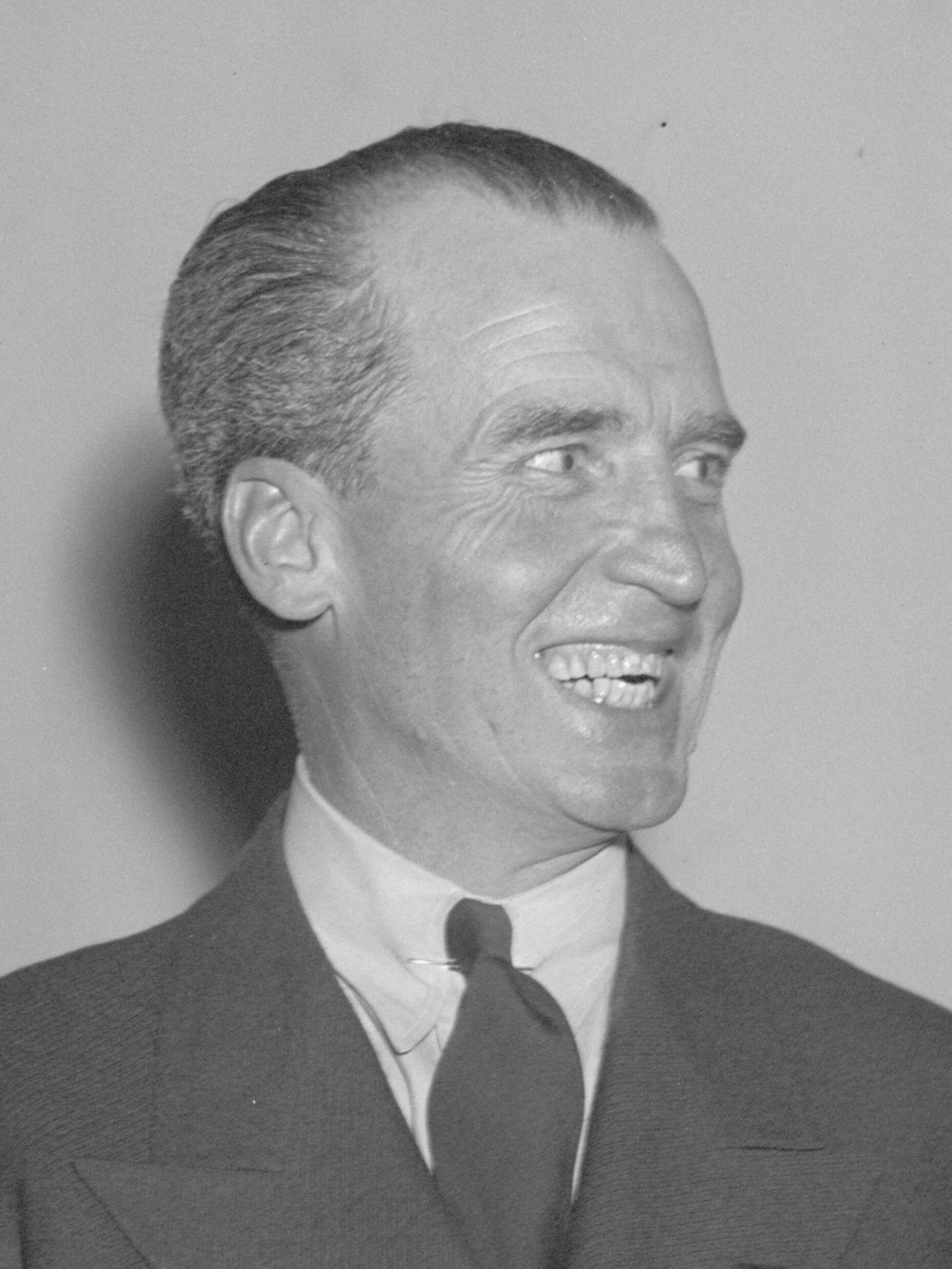

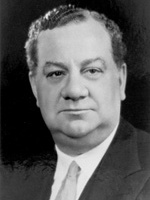
Nominee	William H. Smathers	William Warren Barbour
Party	Democratic	Republican
Popular vote	916,414	740,088
Percentage	54.90%	44.34%
- County results Smathers: 40–50% 50–60% 60–70% 70–80% Barbour: 50–60% 60–70%
U.S. senator before election
William Warren Barbour
Republican
Elected U.S. Senator
William H. Smathers
Democratic

The United States Senate elections of 1936 in New Jersey was held on November 3, 1936.

Incumbent Republican William W. Barbour, who was appointed and then elected to succeed Dwight Morrow, ran for a full term in office but was defeated by State Senator William H. Smathers. Democrats would not win this seat again until 1978, and would not win either seat until 1958.

== Republican primary ==
=== Candidates ===
- David J. Allen, Jersey City resident ("Borah-National Union Social Justice")
- William Warren Barbour, incumbent Senator ("Regular Republican")
- C. Dan Coskey, Jersey City resident and Townsend Plan advocate

=== Results ===
1936 Republican Senate primary
Party	Candidate	Votes	%
Republican	William Warren Barbour (incumbent)	367,021	81.47%
Republican	David J. Allen	49,335	10.95%
Republican	C. Dan Coskey	34,131	7.58%
Total votes		450,487	100.00%

== Democratic primary ==
=== Candidates ===
- Theron McCampbell, Assemblyman from Holmdel and candidate for Governor in 1934
- William H. Smathers, State Senator for Atlantic County

=== Results ===
1936 Democratic Senate primary
Party	Candidate	Votes	%
Democratic	William H. Smathers	225,322	86.88%
Democratic	Theron McCampbell	34,042	13.13%
Total votes		259,364	100.00%

== General election ==
=== Candidates ===
- William Warren Barbour, incumbent Senator (Republican)
- George E. Bopp (Socialist Labor)
- Herbert Coley (Communist)
- Herman F. Niessner (Socialist)
- William H. Smathers, State Senator for Atlantic County (Democratic)
- Malcolm G. Thomas (National Prohibition)
- Fred Turner (For Townsend Plan)

=== Results ===
1936 United States Senate election in New Jersey
Party	Candidate	Votes	%
Democratic	William H. Smathers	916,414	54.90%
Republican	William Warren Barbour (incumbent)	740,088	44.34%
Townsend	Fred Turner	6,651	0.40%
Socialist	Herman F. Niessner	3,309	0.20%
Communist	Herbert Coley	1,414	0.08%
Prohibition	Malcolm G. Thomas	967	0.06%
Socialist Labor	George E. Bopp	448	0.03%
Majority		176,326	10.56%
Turnout		1,669,291	
Democratic gain from Republican			

== See also ==
- 1936 United States Senate elections
