= Francis H. Russell =

American diplomat

Francis Henry Russell
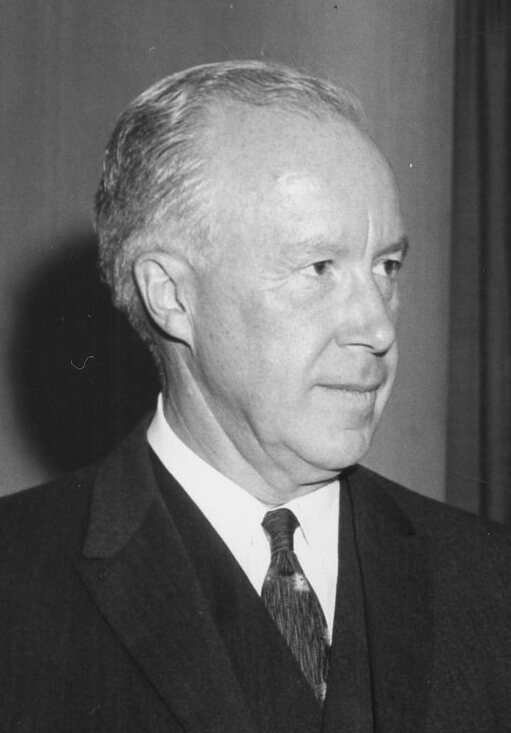

3rd United States Ambassador to Tunisia
- In office October 16, 1962 – July 18, 1969
- President: John F. Kennedy; Lyndon B. Johnson; Richard Nixon
- Preceded by: Walter N. Walmsley
- Succeeded by: John A. Calhoun

2nd United States Ambassador to Ghana
- In office January 23, 1961 – March 13, 1962
- President: John F. Kennedy
- Preceded by: Wilson C. Flake
- Succeeded by: William P. Mahoney Jr.

8th United States Ambassador to New Zealand
- In office June 5, 1957 – November 28, 1960
- President: Dwight D. Eisenhower
- Preceded by: Robert C. Hendrickson
- Succeeded by: Anthony B. Akers

Personal details
- Born: October 1, 1904 Cambridge, Massachusetts
- Died: March 31, 1989 (aged 84) St. Petersburg, Florida

Francis H. Russell (October 1, 1904 – March 31, 1989) was an American diplomat who served as the United States Ambassador to New Zealand from 1957 to 1960, the United States Ambassador to Ghana from 1961 to 1962 and the United States Ambassador to Tunisia from 1962 to 1969. He was the father of sociologist Arlie Russell Hochschild.

He died of a heart attack on March 31, 1989, in St. Petersburg, Florida at age 84.

Russell graduated from Tufts University and Harvard Law School.
