= Arthur Walsh (U.S. senator) =

American politician (1896–1947)

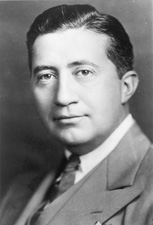

United States Senator from New Jersey
- In office November 26, 1943 – December 7, 1944
- Appointed by: Charles Edison
- Preceded by: W. Warren Barbour
- Succeeded by: H. Alexander Smith

Personal details
- Born: February 26, 1896 Newark, New Jersey, U.S.
- Died: December 13, 1947 (aged 51) New York City, New York, U.S.
- Party: Democratic

Arthur Walsh (February 26, 1896 – December 13, 1947) was an American civil servant, businessman, soldier and World War I veteran, who served as the junior United States senator from New Jersey from November 26, 1943 to December 7, 1944. He was a member of the Democratic Party.

== Biography ==
Born in Newark, New Jersey, Walsh was educated in public schools, by a private tutor, and at the New York University School of Commerce. He began his career as a recording violinist for Thomas Edison in 1915 and later held executive positions with the Edison Enterprises. From 1917 to 1919 he served as a sergeant in the United States Marine Corps, participating in World War I. He later served as a lieutenant in the United States Naval Reserve from 1929 to 1932, and had the rank of colonel in the New Jersey National Guard from 1941 to 1943.

A member of the New Jersey Workmen's Compensation Investigating Commission from 1932 to 1933, he served as New Jersey Director of the Federal Housing Administration from 1934 to 1935, and as Deputy and later as Assistant Administrator at the Washington, D.C. head office from 1935 to 1938. A presidential elector in 1940 on the Democratic ticket, he also was a member of the New Jersey State Board of Regents in 1941 and 1942 and served on the board of directors of the American-Russian Chamber of Commerce in 1943.

He became commissioner of the Port of New York Authority in 1943 but was appointed on November 26, 1943 as a Democrat to the United States Senate to fill the vacancy caused by the death of W. Warren Barbour and served until December 7, 1944, when a duly elected successor qualified. He was not a candidate for election to the vacancy in 1944. He served as chairman of the Committee on Naval Affairs in the 78th United States Congress.

After he left office, he resumed his former business pursuits, becoming an executive vice president at Thomas A. Edison, Inc. He was admitted to Memorial Hospital in Manhattan on December 2, 1947. He underwent an operation on December 8 for an abdominal growth that his family suspected was cancerous, and he died at the hospital on December 13. He was interred in Gate of Heaven Cemetery in East Hanover Township, New Jersey.

U.S. Senate
Preceded by W. Warren Barbour	U.S. senator (Class 1) from New Jersey; 1943–1944; Served alongside: Albert W. Hawkes	Succeeded by H. Alexander Smith
