= Writings of Leon Trotsky =

Writings of Leon Trotsky is a 14-volume set collection of the writings of Leon Trotsky between the years 1929 and 1940, published by Pathfinder Press. This collection was put together in the 1960s and 1970s by initiative of the Socialist Workers Party. Most volumes were edited by George Breitman. Many of the texts were translated to English for the first time.
