= William E. Scotten =

American diplomat

William Everett Scotten (24 August 1904, in Detroit, Michigan – 27 November 1958) was an American diplomat who was the author of the Scotten Report about the Mafia in Sicily during World War II.

== Career ==
The son of William E. Scotten of the Scotten Tobacco Company and Florence Scotten (née Fleming), Scotten attended the University of Southern California where he earned a Bachelor of Arts in Latin in 1925. He then attended the University of Paris from 1926 to 1927 where he studied Art History. His first United States Foreign Service posting was as the U.S. vice consul in Ciudad Juarez in 1929. He then served as consul in Saigon from 1931 to 1932. Later he went to Hong Kong where he married Josephine Bryant in 1933.

In 1938 he served in Palermo as the American vice-counsel for three years. In 1939 he was serving as the Second Secretary of the American Legation at Bucharest.

== World War II ==
During the Second World War he was posted to the Tangier International Zone as the consul and second secretary in Tangier in March 1942. He was later commissioned in the United States Army.

Based on his experience in Palermo, Captain Scotten was called upon by the Commissioner of Public Safety of the Allied Military Government Headquarters to write a report on the Mafia in Sicily and its effect on the Allied Occupation. Scotten wrote a six page report The Problem of the Mafia in Sicily in October 29, 1943.

Scotten's report detailed the history of the Mafia and concluded with three possible actions.

1) Direct and prompt action to bring the Mafia under control
2) A negotiated truce with Mafia leaders
3) Abandonment of any attempt to control the Mafia

Scotten finished the war as a Major in Vienna. He was made a Knight of the Order of the Crown of Italy and awarded the Bronze Star Medal.

== Retirement ==
He retired in Orange County, California, where he died in on 27 November 1958.
