= Robert M. Scotten =

American diplomat

Robert McGregor Scotten (1891–1968) was an American ambassador to Costa Rica, Ecuador, and New Zealand.

Born in Detroit, Michigan on August 18, 1891, his father was Oren Scotten and his mother was Mary Clarke (McGregor) Scotten. Scotten served as Foreign Service officer; U.S. Consul in Asuncion from 1926 to 1927. He was ambassador to the Dominican Republic from 1940 to 1942, later he served as ambassador to Costa Rica from 1942 to 1943, Ecuador from 1943 to 1947, New Zealand first as minister from 1947 to 1948 and then as ambassador (reaccredited) 1948 to 1955. He died in 1968.

Diplomatic posts
| Preceded by Boaz Walton Long | United States Ambassador to Ecuador; 1943–1947 | Succeeded by John F. Simmons |
| Preceded by post created | United States Ambassador to New Zealand; 1948–1955 | Succeeded by Robert C. Hendrickson |
| Preceded by post created | United States Ambassador to Samoa; 1948–1955 | Succeeded by Robert C. Hendrickson |
