= John Milton (New Jersey politician) =

American politician (1881–1977)

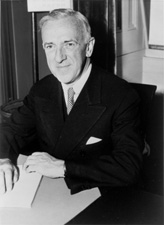

United States Senator from New Jersey
- In office January 18, 1938 – November 8, 1938
- Appointed by: A. Harry Moore
- Preceded by: A. Harry Moore
- Succeeded by: William W. Barbour

Personal details
- Born: January 21, 1881 Jersey City, New Jersey, U.S.
- Died: April 14, 1977 (aged 96) Jersey City, New Jersey, U.S.
- Party: Democratic

John Gerald Milton (January 21, 1881 – April 14, 1977) was a Democratic United States Senator from New Jersey.

== Biography ==
Born in Jersey City, New Jersey he attended the public schools. He then studied law and was admitted to the bar in 1903 and commenced practice in Jersey City, N.J. He was appointed on January 18, 1938, as a Democrat to the United States Senate, to fill the vacancy caused by the resignation of A. Harry Moore and served from January 18, 1938, to November 8, 1938, when a successor was elected. He was not a candidate to fill the vacancy. He then resumed the practice of law. He resided in Jersey City, New Jersey where he died and was interred in Holy Cross Cemetery, North Arlington, New Jersey.

U.S. Senate
| Preceded by A. Harry Moore | U.S. senator (Class 1) from New Jersey; January 18, 1938 – November 8, 1938; Served alongside: William H. Smathers | Succeeded by William W. Barbour |
Honorary titles
| Preceded by George Radcliffe | Oldest living U.S. senator July 29, 1974 – April 14, 1977 | Succeeded by Hall Lusk |
