= John Cotton Dana Library =

Research library

Coordinates: 40.741811°N 74.174963°W

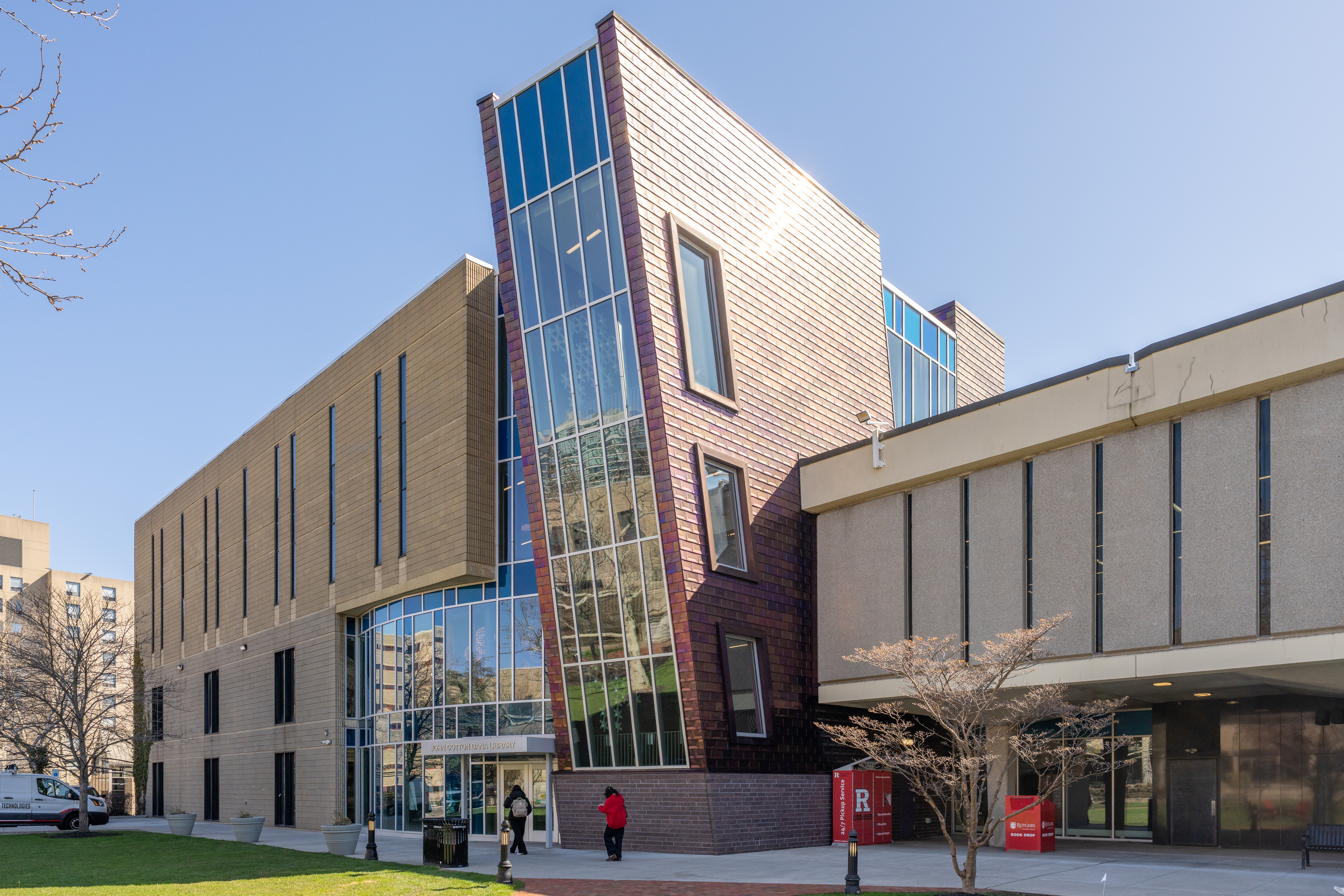
- Type: Public
- Established: 1967
- Location: 185 University Avenue; Newark, New Jersey, USA
- Campus: Rutgers–Newark
- Website: www.libraries.rutgers.edu/dana

The John Cotton Dana Library, referred to simply as the Dana Library, is the third largest library of Rutgers University and the main library on its Newark campus. The library collections focus on business, management, and nursing. The fourth floor houses the Institute of Jazz Studies, the world's largest jazz library and archive. The library also includes the Dana Digital Media lab for digitizing library collections and the Booth Ferris multimedia rooms. The library serves approximately 9,000 students, faculty, and staff.

== History ==
The library is named after John Cotton Dana, library director of the Newark Public Library, founder and director of The Newark Museum of Art, and Newark's "First Citizen." The current building was erected in 1967 although the library was named for Mr. Dana in 1929.

== Institute of Jazz Studies ==
The Institute of Jazz Studies (IJS) is the largest and most comprehensive library and archives of jazz and jazz-related materials in the world. The archival collection contains more than 100,000 sound recordings and 6,000 books. It also houses over 30 instruments used by famous jazz musicians.

In 2013, the institute was designated a Literary Landmark by New Jersey's Center for the Book in the National Registry of the Library of Congress. It is the fifth place in New Jersey to be given this designation, after the Newark Public Library, Paterson Public Library, the Walt Whitman House and the Joyce Kilmer Tree, which is also at Rutgers University.

== See also ==
- Archibald S. Alexander Library
