= Albert W. Hawkes =

United States Senator from New Jersey

Albert Wahl Hawkes
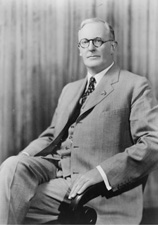

United States Senator from New Jersey
- In office January 3, 1943 – January 3, 1949
- Preceded by: William H. Smathers
- Succeeded by: Robert C. Hendrickson

Personal details
- Born: November 20, 1878 Chicago, Illinois, U.S.
- Died: May 9, 1971 (aged 92) Palm Desert, California, U.S.
- Party: Republican

Albert Wahl Hawkes (November 20, 1878 – May 9, 1971) was an American businessman and Republican Party politician who represented New Jersey in the United States Senate from 1943 to 1949. During and after his term in office, he was a leading figure in the conservative wing of the New Jersey Republican Party. He dropped out of his race for re-election after facing a primary challenge from the moderate wing, led by Governor Alfred E. Driscoll, with whom he had a running dispute.

== Early life and education ==
Albert Wahl Hawkes was born in Chicago on November 20, 1878.

Hawkes left school at the age of 15 to work as an office boy for a chemical company and studied law at night classes at Chicago College of Law. He graduated at the age of 21 in 1900, gaining admission to the bar the same year.

Hawkes studied chemistry at Lewis Institute (now the Illinois Institute of Technology) for two years and engaged in the chemical business.

== Business career ==
During the First World War, Hawkes served as director of the Chemical Alliance in Washington, D.C. (1917–1918).

In 1926, Hawkes was serving as executive vice president of General Chemical Company when he was elected president of Congoleum-Nairn, Inc. in Kearny, New Jersey. He assumed chairmanship of the corporation board in 1937.

In 1941, Hawkes became president of the United States Chamber of Commerce. President Franklin D. Roosevelt also named him to the National War Labor Board in 1942. He was also a member of the Newark Labor Board and a member of the Board to Maintain Industrial Peace in New Jersey from 1941 to 1942.

After leaving the Senate, he returned to Congoleum-Nairn before retiring in 1951.

== Political career ==
In 1942, following his appointment to the National War Labor Board, Hawkes ran for United States Senate. He defeated Gill Robb Wilson in the Republican primary and Democratic incumbent William H. Smathers in the general election.

As Senator, Hawkes was an ardent conservative, particularly on economic issues. Early in Hawkes's term, Senate Minority Leader Charles L. McNary remarked of him, "His economic thinking goes back to B.C." Hawkes supported the wartime measures taken by the Roosevelt administration but was a consistent advocate for a return to "free enterprise" policies once the war ended. In June 1946, he said that the federal government had corrected monopoly in capital and should also correct monopoly by labor leaders, "who apparently have the power without restraint of law to bring the nation to its knees."

=== 1948 re-election campaign and retirement ===
During Hawkes's term in office, Governor of New Jersey Alfred E. Driscoll emerged as the dominant force in the New Jersey Republican Party, and Driscoll sought to put forward a less conservative candidate for Hawkes's seat in the April 1948 primary. In January 1948, Driscoll and other Republican leaders in the state called for Hawkes to end his re-election bid and endorsed state senator and wealthy Englewood stockbroker David Van Alstyne Jr. for the Senate nomination, arguing that Hawkes could not win re-election. In particular, critics pointed to a recent fundraising dinner speech in which Hawkes said, "I have never hated anyone in my life longer than overnight. There is one exception–and he [Franklin D. Roosevelt] lies buried in Hyde Park" as a fatal political blunder.

Hawkes responded sharply to the calls for his withdrawal,

"This choice has been made by whipping recalcitrant supporters into line and by utilizing other pressures of power politics–in short, by substituting one-man control for the right of the people to choose their own candidate. We are being treated to the emergence of a Republican oligarchy in New Jersey in which the titular head of the party becomes the state, not the representative of the people in the state."

Soon, it became clear that Van Alstyne would fail to unify the party establishment in opposition to Hawkes. On February 13, state treasurer Robert C. Hendrickson announced his campaign for the seat, bringing the endorsements of 17 out of 21 county Republican leaders. Only Bergen County endorsed another candidate, state labor commissioner and native son Harry Harper. Atlantic, Ocean, and Cape May counties remained neutral. Hawkes had no institutional support, but reiterated that he would remain in the race.

Hawkes ended his campaign on March 5, 1948, denouncing "Boss Driscoll" and other party leaders as "New Deal Republicans". Hendrickson went on to win the nomination and general election.

=== 1952 Republican National Convention ===
At the 1952 Republican National Convention, Hawkes supported his former colleague, Senator Robert A. Taft of Ohio, for the presidential nomination over General Dwight D. Eisenhower. He continued to speak out for a more conservative Republican position.

== Personal life and death ==
Hawkes had a son, A. Whitfield Hawkes and a daughter, Morgan.

- A. Whitfield Hawkes attended Montclair Academy, Phillips Academy Andover, Princeton University, and Columbia University College of Physicians and Surgeons. He became a neurologist in New York City and married Jane White in 1937. In 1942, Whitfield died from a tick-borne disease while stationed in the South Pacific as a major in the United States Army Medical Corps. Jane White remarried to Alistair Cooke, the host of Masterpiece Theatre.
- Morgan Hawkes Paddelford lived in Pasadena, California.

Hawkes was a trustee of the Freedoms Foundation at Valley Forge, Pennsylvania, where the Hawkes Library was named after him.

Hawkes died on May 9, 1971, in Palm Desert, California. He was interred in Mount Hebron Cemetery, in Montclair, New Jersey.

U.S. Senate
| Preceded by William H. Smathers | U.S. senator (Class 2) from New Jersey; 1943–1949; Served alongside: W. Warren Barbour, Arthur Walsh, Howard Smith | Succeeded by Robert C. Hendrickson |
Party political offices
| Preceded by W. Warren Barbour | Republican Nominee for the U.S. Senate (Class 2) from New Jersey; 1942 | Succeeded by Robert C. Hendrickson |
