= Winant Van Winkle =

American politician (1879–1943)

Member of the New Jersey Senate from the Bergen County district
- In office 1935–1940
- Preceded by: William H. J. Ely
- Succeeded by: Lloyd L. Schroeder

Personal details
- Born: March 17, 1879 Rutherford, New Jersey, U.S.
- Died: 1943 (aged 63–64)
- Party: Republican
- Spouse: Jessie Van Winkle
- Relations: Daniel Van Winkle (grandfather)
- Profession: Politician

Winant Van Winkle (March 17, 1879–1943) was an American politician who served in the New Jersey Senate from 1935 to 1940, representing Bergen County as a Republican.

== Early life ==
Winkle was born and raised in Rutherford, New Jersey.

== Career ==
Winkle served in the New Jersey Senate from 1935 to 1940, representing Bergen County as a Republican.

== Personal life and death ==
Winkle was married.

Winkle was part of the eighth generation of his family in Bergen County. His grandfather, Daniel Van Winkle, served as the leader of the Republican Party of Bergen.

Winkle died in 1943.

New Jersey Senate
Preceded by William H. J. Ely	Member of the New Jersey Senate from the Bergen County district 1935–1940	Succeeded by Lloyd L. Schroeder
