= W. Warren Barbour =

American politician (1888–1943)

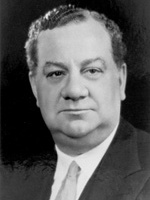

United States Senator from New Jersey
- In office December 1, 1931 – January 3, 1937
- Preceded by: Dwight Morrow
- Succeeded by: William H. Smathers
- In office November 9, 1938 – November 22, 1943
- Preceded by: John G. Milton
- Succeeded by: Arthur Walsh

4th Mayor of Rumson
- In office 1924–1929
- Preceded by: William H. Mahoney
- Succeeded by: Van R. Halsey

Personal details
- Born: July 31, 1888 Monmouth Beach, New Jersey, U.S.
- Died: November 22, 1943 (aged 55) Washington, D.C., U.S.
- Party: Republican

William Warren Barbour (July 31, 1888 – November 22, 1943) was an American Republican Party politician who represented New Jersey in the United States Senate from 1931 to 1937 and again from 1938 until his death in office in 1943. He was also a business leader and amateur heavyweight boxing champion in both the United States (1910) and Canada (1911).

== Family background and early life ==
W. Warren Barbour, the third of four brothers, was born in 1888 to Colonel William Barbour and his wife, Julia Adelaide Sprague, in Monmouth Beach, Monmouth County, New Jersey. His eldest brother, Thomas Barbour, a general naturalist and herpetologist, served as director of the Museum of Comparative Zoology at Harvard. His father, Colonel William Barbour, was founder and president of the Linen Thread Company, Inc., a thread manufacturing enterprise having much business on both sides of the Atlantic.

W. Warren Barbour attended the public schools, but ultimately graduated from the Browning School, New York City, in 1906. He also entered Princeton University but left after one semester to join The Linen Thread Company, of which his father was president. W. Warren Barbour became president of the company in 1917 when his father, "The Colonel", died.

As a teenager, Barbour suffered from tuberculosis, which he overcame by intensive exercise and participation in sports. These athletic pursuits included boxing, which eventually led to his becoming amateur heavyweight boxing champion of the United States in 1910, when he defeated Joseph Burke, and Canada in 1911.

Around this time, both Theodore Roosevelt and "Gentleman Jim" Corbett wanted him to take up the mantle of "the great white hope" and fight Jack Johnson, the reigning professional heavyweight champion. While the idea apparently appealed to Barbour and his father, his mother was adamantly opposed and firmly quashed the plan. While Barbour never continued with a professional boxing career, he did serve as timekeeper for the Jess Willard vs. Jack Dempsey fight in 1919.

Militarily, he served as a member of the New York National Guard for ten years, being stationed on the Mexican border in 1916, and attaining the rank of captain. In 1921, he married Elysabeth Cochran Carrere, a union which gave rise to three children and ten grandchildren. Soon after his marriage, Barbour entered the political arena, serving as a member of the Rumson Borough Council in 1922 and as mayor of Rumson from 1923 to 1928.

== Political career and opposition to the Holocaust ==
By 1930, Barbour and his family took their house in Locust Point, Monmouth County, N.J., as their official residence, while also maintaining a home in New York City. Barbour continued his work in various industrial enterprises, primarily including the family thread manufacturing business, of which he was president. On December 1, 1931, New Jersey Governor Morgan F. Larson appointed Barbour, a Republican, to the United States Senate to fill the vacancy created by the death of Dwight W. Morrow.

The appointment was confirmed the following year when he was narrowly elected to the U.S. Senate on November 8, 1932, with 49% of the vote, in a year when more than half of the Republican incumbents running for the Senate were defeated when Franklin Roosevelt and the Democratic Party won in a landslide. He served in the Senate until January 3, 1937. After completing Morrow's unfinished term, Barbour was unsuccessful in his 1936 reelection bid. For the next two years, he resumed his former pursuits, including service as a member of the New Jersey unemployment compensation commission in 1937. Barbour regained his Senate seat on November 8, 1938, when he was elected to fill the vacancy caused by the resignation of A. Harry Moore. Popularly elected to the office in 1940 after completing Moore's term, he served as U.S. Senator from New Jersey until his death in 1943.

The plight of victims of Nazi genocide stirred Barbour deeply. In April 1943, along with many other Congressmen and Senators, Barbour may have attended a performance of We Will Never Die, a pageant written by Ben Hecht and produced by the Bergson Group to commemorate two million European Jews who had already been murdered. In the fall of 1943, he was one of a small group of senators and congressmen who, together with the vice president, met with 400 rabbis who marched with the Bergson Group in Washington in 1943, shortly before Yom Kippur, the Jewish Day of Atonement. It was hoped their march would encourage the United States government to take a formal stand against the Holocaust. While President Franklin D. Roosevelt did not meet with the rabbis, Senator Barbour, along with a handful of Congressional colleagues, met them on the steps of the United States Capitol and expressed his commitment to their cause.

On October 14, 1943, barely a week after meeting with the rabbis, and despite strong public and political opinion against allowing further immigration to the United States, Barbour introduced a bill that would have permitted as many as 100,000 victims of the Holocaust "who are now being persecuted either because of racial or religious belief" to come to America and to remain in the United States as visitors for the duration of the war. This would have been a significant change from the existing policy limiting immigration to only 2% of the number of their countrymen who had been in the United States as of the 1890 Census.

Barbour's death just a few weeks later in November 1943, prevented him from working toward passage of the bill. His support of the rabbis, however, and his subsequent actions in the Senate did much to increase political and public awareness of and compassion for the victims of the Nazi genocide.

== Death and burial ==
Senator Barbour died of a cerebral hemorrhage on November 22, 1943, at age 55 at his home in Washington, D.C.

He is buried with his parents and a brother, Robert Barbour, at Cedar Lawn Cemetery in Paterson, New Jersey.

Divorced at the time of his death from Elysabeth Cochran (née Carrere) Barbour (who married, in 1947, Sir William Lawrie Welsh), he was survived by three children and, subsequently, ten grandchildren.

== See also ==
- List of members of the United States Congress who died in office (1900–1949)

== Notes ==
U.S. Senate
Preceded by Dwight W. Morrow	U.S. senator (Class 2) from New Jersey; 1931–1937; Served alongside: Hamilton Fish Kean, A. Harry Moore	Succeeded by William H. Smathers
Preceded by John G. Milton	U.S. senator (Class 1) from New Jersey; 1938–1943; Served alongside: William H. Smathers, Albert W. Hawkes	Succeeded by Arthur Walsh
Party political offices
Preceded by Dwight W. Morrow	Republican Nominee for the U.S. Senate (Class 2) from New Jersey; 1932, 1936	Succeeded by Albert W. Hawkes
Preceded by Hamilton Fish Kean	Republican Nominee for the U.S. Senate (Class 1) from New Jersey; 1938, 1940	Succeeded by Howard Alexander Smith
