= Frank Kingdon =

American activist and educator

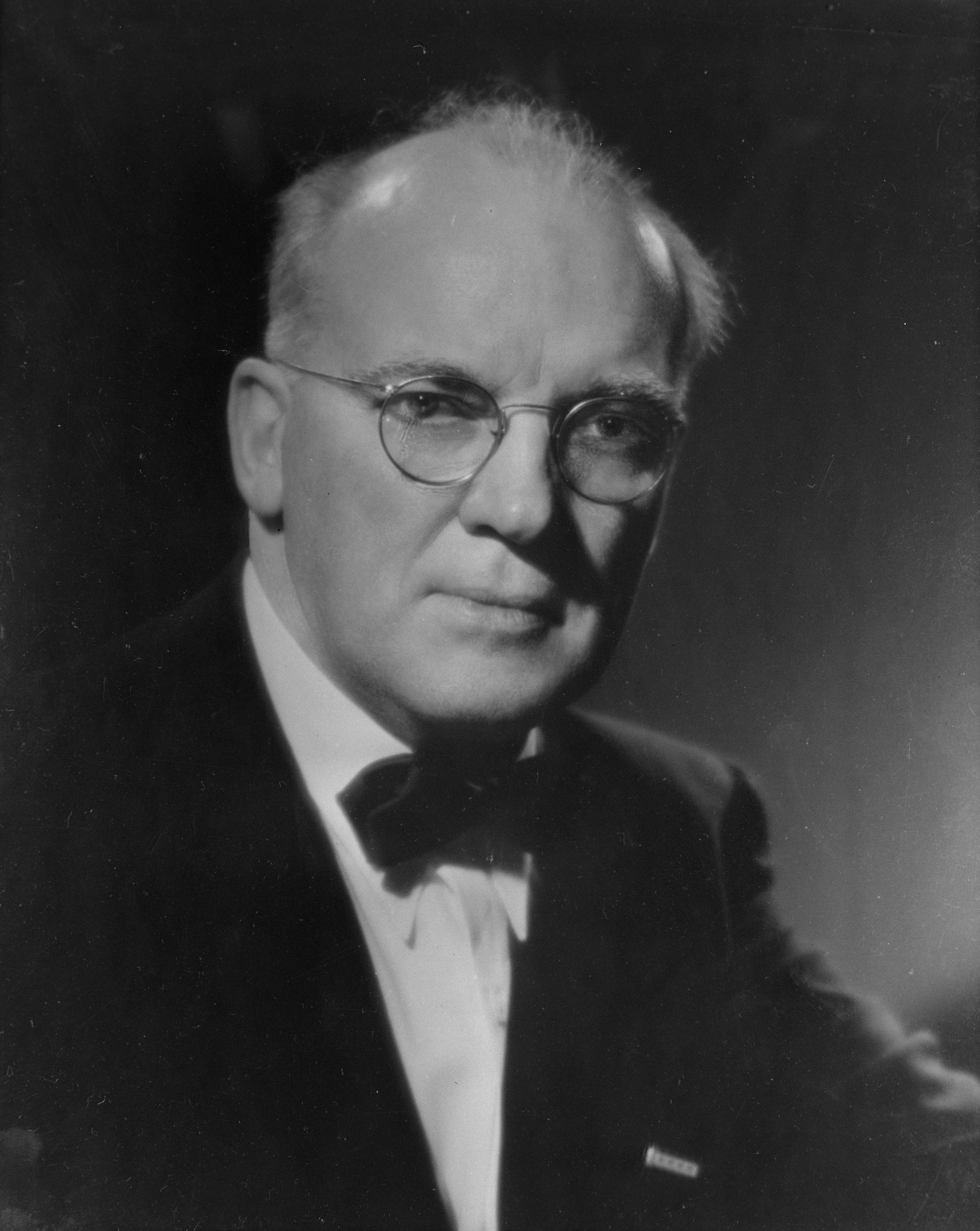
- Kingdon c. 1946
- Born: Frank Kingdon; February 27, 1894; London, United Kingdom
- Died: February 25, 1972 (aged 77); Manhattan, New York, U.S.
- Education: University College London; Boston University; Harvard University; Albion College; Ohio Northern University
- Occupations: Educator, Author and Commentator
- Known for: Emergency Rescue Committee; Progressive Citizens of America
- Spouses: Gertrude Littlefield; Marcella Markham
- Children: John, Frank, David, Gertrude, Barrie, Tom

Frank Kingdon was an English-born American journalist, activist, and academic administrator. Kingdon was the first chairman of the Emergency Rescue Committee, which rescued approximately 2,000 people from the Holocaust. He also served as president of Dana College and the University of Newark (now Rutgers). Kingdon was also a civil rights advocate, columnist for the New York Post, a minister, radio commentator, and co-chair of the Progressive Citizens of America.

== Early life and career ==
He came alone to the United States in 1912 as a youth of seventeen and was ordained a minister of the Methodist Church. Four years later he transferred to the pastorate of Hull, Massachusetts,. This transfer made it possible for him to continue his education. During his pastorates in Hull, East Weymouth, and Boston, he earned his A.B. degree from Boston University, and won a Jacob Sleeper Fellowship at Harvard working in philosophy and religion. In 1925 he accepted the pastorate of the Central Church, Lansing, Michigan. While in Michigan he did graduate work in social psychology at Michigan State College, and received a degree of D.D. from Albion College.

In 1922 Kingdon became the pastor of Calvary Church in East Orange, New Jersey. He resigned from this pastorate in October 1934 to accept the Presidency of Dana College, Newark, which was later merged with other Newark institutions to form the University of Newark. Kingdon became the first President of the University. He was the Campaign Chairman of the Newark Community Chest and President of the Newark Welfare Federation for three years. Kingdon resigned from the Presidency of the University of Newark in June, 1940 to devote himself to interpreting democracy and to assist all agencies at work in the United States to safeguard against anti-democratic forces.

During World War II he served as the first Chairman of the Emergency Rescue Committee raising funds that sent Varian Fry into NAZI controlled Vichy France helping rescue between two and four thousand anti-NAZI and Jewish refugees from the Holocaust. He also served as Special Consultant in the Office of Civilian Defense during the period of its organization, a member of the Executive Committee of the United States Committee for the Care of European Children, and Chairman of the Executive Committee of the Committee for Refugee Education in New York City. He has been a special lecturer at Town Hall, New York, at the Institute of Public Affairs' of the University of Virginia, and the Williamstown Institute of Human Relations. Frank Kingdon was a well-known radio commentator in the 1930s and 1940s with a daily program of news-comment at WMCA (AM).

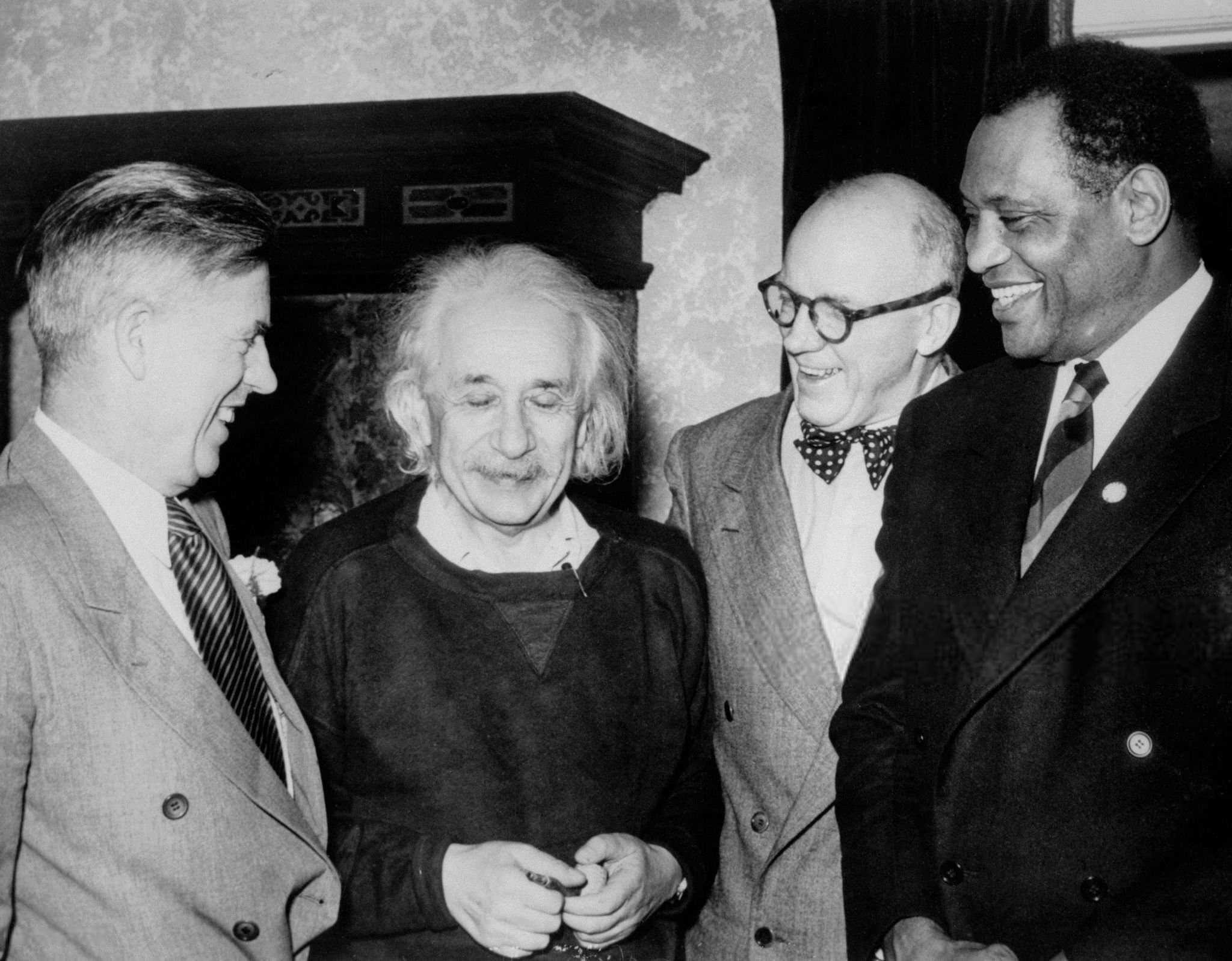
Kingdon (second from right) with Henry A. Wallace, Albert Einstein and Paul Robeson at Einstein's home in Princeton, New Jersey, September 21, 1947

Following World War II and the abandonment of equal rights advocate Henry Wallace on the 1944 Presidential ticket in favor of known racist and pro-segregationist Harry S. Truman. Kingdon left the Democratic party and served as Co-Chair of the Progressive Citizens of America. Kingdon left the group in 1947 because he felt a third-party race for President by Henry Wallace would prove futile. In the late 1950's with Michael Gore, he started a publication called the American Salesman, a digest-type magazine with ideas and techniques on selling, advertising, promoting, marketing, and merchandizing.

He also authored several books including "Humane Religion," 1930; "When Half Gods Go," 1933; Jersey Joads: the Story of the Cranberry Case (1940); "Life of John Cotton Dana,' 1940; "1776 and Today," 1941; "Our Second War of Independence," 1942; "Jacob's Ladder," 1943; "That Man in the White House," 1944; "An Uncommon Man: Or, Henry Wallace and 60 Million Jobs," 1945, and "Architects of the Republic," 1947.

== Emergency Rescue Committee ==
In 1936 Reinhold Niebuhr founded an informal organization called the American Friends of German Freedom (AFGF) with a mission of preparing "the way for a peace which will give German democracy a new opportunity". In June 1940, France fell to NAZI Germany. The Armistice of 22 June 1940 called for the French to surrender on demand any Germany refugees who had fled to France. Following this the AFGF held a large fundraising luncheon at Hotel Commodore on June 25, 1940. Presiding over the luncheon Kingdon became the chairman with the new organization with it taking approximately 3 weeks to formalize. The ERC setup its offices in the Chanin Building, New York City.

The Original Officers of the Emergency Rescue Committee included:

- Chairman: Frank Kingdon
- Vice-chairman: L. Hollingsworth Wood, founding member [ACLU]
- Treasurer: David F. Seiferheld
- Secretary: Mildred Adams
- Assistant to the President: Ingrid Warburg Spinelli

Committee:

- Emmons Blaine
- Elmer Davis
- Robert Maynard Hutchins, President, University of Chicago
- Alvin Saunders Johnson, President, New School for Social Research
- Henry Goodard Leach, philanthropist
- William Allan Neilson, President, Smith College
- Charles Seymour, President, Yale University
- George Shuster, Editor, The Commonweal
- Raymond Gram Swing, news commentator
- Dorothy Thompson, journalist

The first task of the ERC was then to find a representative to send across the Atlantic to carry out operations. The second task being to create a list of priority refugees who were in grave danger. Those who were already well-known such as famous writers, artists, musicians, and famous intellectuals were the first selected both because their notoriety put them in danger but also because they were known to the committee. Thomas Mann compiled a list of writers and poets. Alfred Barr of the Museum of Modern Art submitted a list of artists; Max Ascoli provided names of Italian anti-Fascists; Jan Masaryk covered the Czech refugees; Alvarez del Vayo and Joseph Buttinger covered the Spanish anti-Fascists; Alvin Saunders Johnson listed intellectuals, scientists and composers; Jacques Maritain and Jules Romains contributed more names in the field of literature. The only disqualifier for a candidate being communist sympathies. Once a refugees political affiliation was verified the group would allot $300-$350 for their rescue.

The ERC's first official luncheon was held at the Hotel Ambassador on August 14, 1940, raising $4,526 ($94,525 in 2022 dollars) or enough to rescue about 15 refugees. Speakers included Genevieve Tabouis, political opponent of Mussolini Carlo Sforza, Elmer Davis, and of course Frank Kingdon. By December 1941 the ERC raised over $215,000 and would recue almost a thousand people by end of 1941. Located out of the Hôtel Splendide in Marseilles the ERC led in Europe by Varian Fry in France provided financial support and visas to refugees to escape France. This was a major challenge for the ERC as most countries in 1940-1941 had closed its borders.

With Varian Fry in Europe and enough money to fund the endeavor the major problem facing the ERC became getting visas. Kingdon had won the support of Eleanor Roosevelt but the state department visas were under control of anti-Semitic assistant secretary of state Breckinridge Long. To further the issue Varian Fry's exploits and opposition to Vichy Law became an issue as Fry argued for more pressure on the state department to get visas while the ERC's backers such as Reinhold Niebuhr called to reign Fry in as he was seen as jeopardizing the entire mission of the ERC. Varian Fry demanding himself more of the ERC leadership in pressuring the state department. Foreign correspondent Jay Allen and member of the ERC located in Europe put pressure on Kingdon to recall Fry as well. With the divisions in Europe apparent as pressure from both abroad and home Kingdon sent a series of letters attempting to reign Fry in and eventually asking for his return.

Eventually, Fry's exploits caught up to him as Vichy police put him under surveillance and expelled him from France in September 1941 returning to New York on November 2, 1941. Jay Allen replaced Fry but too much attention had been brought to bear and he was arrested by NAZI authorities in occupied France and held for four months. On December 7, 1941, the Japanese attacked Pearl Harbor and by December 11 Germany entered the war against the US effectively bringing to an end the mission of the ERC having rescued nearly 2,000 refugees from NAZI Europe.

== International Rescue Committee ==
Kingdon announced on February 5, 1942, that the ERC would merge with the International Relief Agency (IRA) as the IRA had continued to function under Karel Sternberg until his arrest by the Gestapo in 1942. In order to maintain the mission of the IRC all the "troublesome" members were removed from the new organization which included Kingdon himself, as well as, Fry.

== World War II ==
Kingdon working to fight the influences of Hitler's Mein Kampf was also the honorary founder and chairmanof the laymen's bible association sponsored by 200 leading American citizens declaring a "Bible Week" to take place from December 8 to 14, 1941. The bible association had been asked to visit the White House on December 10 and read the Bible on national radio a few days before the White House visit on December 7, 1941. Due to the attack on Pearl Harbor, Kingdon voluntarily withdrew their invitation to the White House and send the following telegram to President Roosevelt:

"At this time a national crisis with the whole nation looking to you for guidance and leadership, the Laymen's National Committee sponsoring (the) first annual Bible week in America, scheduled to meet with you on Wednesday December 10th to present you with a Holy Bible in commemoration of this important event, do in consideration of the many problems confronting you hereby waive that privilege. May God bless and guide you in this great emergency. Rest assured this organization will do everything in its power to urge the people of this country to unite and hold steadfast to faith in God and pray that liberty and justice under your guidance will not perish from this earth."

However, the Laymen's Bible Association received a phone call asking if they will still read the Bible on air to comfort the American public. Eleanor Roosevelt herself thought it significant that the war started at the beginning of the first annual national bible week led by Kingdon.

During the war Frank Kingdon was hired as a spokesman for the war effort by the Office of Emergency Management in early 1942. For this position he was investigated by the FBI finding him to be an anti-communist. In mid-1942 Kingdon started a position as a new commentator on WMCA (AM). By January 1942 Kingdon would host a weekday program on world news in terms of democratic achievements. He was also hired by radio station WOR to review the week's events on Sunday morning. Kingdon was a famed public speaker as a minister who started at an early age, where he would recite sermons on the street corner under the supervision of his mother in London. This lent well to his entrance into radio. Kingdon in 1943 published his autobiography, Jacob's Ladder. In 1944, Kingdon was featured in the New York Post praising his contributions. The post reported that his liberal views were not popular with conservatives and that the House Un-American Committee (the Dies Committee) was characterizing Kingdon as a communist tool. He won the Newspaper Guild of New York's "Page One Award" for his war efforts on radio and for outstanding liberal commentary. His second book, That Man in the White House, written about President Roosevelt to help secure his reelection, sold over 100,000 copies. President Roosevelt even offered to back Kingdon for a Senate seat in New Jersey, but Kingdon could not come to an agreement with New Jersey political broken Frank Hague and therefore decided not to run for office.

== Post-war ==
It is stated that Kingdon considered himself a man of principle above all else. Due to of his refusal to back down on his more controversial opinions by 1947 Kingon's radio commentaries drew the ire of conservative veterans' groups and pressure from the dies committee. While Kingdon maintained high ratings on his radio programs so many sponsors pulled out that both radio stations fired him. In the summer of 1947, Kingdon was hired on as an editorial page columnist for the New York Post where he wrote his own column "To be Frank" until 1952. In one of his first Columns at the post he criticized President Truman and FBI director J. Edgar Hoover over their unconstitutional loyalty boards that had the power to fire federal employees for said disloyalty. When Hoover sent a letter confronting Kingdon for undermining confidence in the FBI a veil for being personally offended Kingdon responded that he thought the loyalty boards were an assault on civil liberties. Thus for the rest of his career at the New York Post Kingdon found himself under FBI surveillance.

Kingdon opposing President Harry S. Truman's assaults on civil liberties and his avowed racism left the Democratic Party to take up the cause of Henry Wallace's Progressive Party. He attended rallies on his behalf with other famous activists like Alfred Drake, Paul Robeson, and actor and future president Ronald Reagan, wrote a book Henry Wallace and 60 Million Jobs and filed to run for a Senate seat in New Jersey. He had a falling out however with the Progressive Party and withdrew his support.

Kingdon was also an early advocate for Israel often speaking at United Jewish Appeal events. The Joint Distribution Committee asked Kingdon to go to Germany to visit refugee camps in the American zone in December 1948. Because of his politics the State Department refused him a visa. However, the Jewish community according to his granddaughter Jill Dempsey embraced Kingdon and in turn he continued speaking engagements for the community to raise money to establish the new State of Israel.

In 1952 Kingdon was fired from The New York Post by Dolly Schiff due to McCarthyite pressure. At age 57 Kingdon found himself blacklisted by the FBI and unable to find work in the industry. The last FBI report on Kingdon being in 1963 for his continued involvement in civil rights and his membership on the "Committee of 100" in support of the NAACP Legal Defense and Educational Fund. He spent the later part of his years lecturing at The New School and Stephen Wise Free Synagogue, as well as, some ghost writing. The New School even named a lecture hall on the 12th Street Building in Manhattan. Kingdon was also knighted in 1946 by the King of Denmark receiving the Christian Medal for his assistance in the Dutch Resistance. He served for many years on the Conference of Christians and Jews and a supported the United Jewish Appeal.
