= David Van Alstyne =

American politician

Member of the New Jersey Senate from Bergen County
- In office 1943–1953
- Preceded by: Lloyd L. Schroeder
- Succeeded by: Walter H. Jones

Member of the New Jersey General Assembly from the Bergen district
- In office 1940–1941

Personal details
- Born: January 3, 1897 Louisville, Kentucky, U.S.
- Died: October 10, 1985 (aged 88) Englewood, New Jersey, U.S.
- Party: Republican
- Relatives: Leah Ayres (granddaughter)

David Van Alstyne (January 3, 1897 – October 10, 1985) was an American politician who served in the New Jersey General Assembly from 1940 to 1941 and in the New Jersey Senate from 1943 to 1953.

He died of a heart attack on October 10, 1985, at his home in Englewood, New Jersey at age 88.
