= George Breitman =

American political activist (1916–1986)

- Breitman as he appeared at the time of his 1942 campaign for U.S. Senate
- Born: February 28, 1916; Newark, New Jersey, U.S.
- Died: April 19, 1986 (aged 70); New York City, U.S.
- Occupations: Political activist; author; publisher
- Years active: 1935–1986
- Political party: Workers Party of the United States (1935–1936); Socialist Party of America (1936–1937); Socialist Workers Party (1938–1984)
- Spouse: Dorothea Katz (m. 1940)

George Breitman (February 28, 1916 – April 19, 1986) was an American political activist, author, and publisher affiliated with the Trotskyist movement. He was a founding member of the Socialist Workers Party (SWP) and a long-time editor of its weekly newspaper The Militant. He ran unsuccessfully four times as the SWP candidate for the U.S. Senate from New Jersey. In addition to managing the SWP publishing house in the 1960s and '70s, Breitman edited and wrote over a dozen books, and became known as an authority on the life and speeches of Malcolm X.

== Biography ==
=== Early years ===
George Breitman was born February 28, 1916, into a Jewish family in a working-class neighborhood of Newark, New Jersey. His father Benjamin Breitman was an iceman, and his mother Pauline Trattler Breitman worked as a maid. George attended public school in Newark. When his father died at age 40, George's older sister Celia quit school to help support the family. She was in the Young Communist League and was a key influence on her brother's political education. When he was 11, she brought him to a protest against the executions of Sacco and Vanzetti. He graduated from Newark Central High School during the Great Depression, and found work initially in the New Deal's Civilian Conservation Corps, and then in the Works Progress Administration.

=== Political activist ===
Breitman returned to Newark in 1935 and joined the Trotskyist movement as a member of the Spartacus Youth League section within the Workers Party of the United States (WPUS). Later that year he joined the adult WPUS. As an activist in the Workers Alliance of America, an organization of the unemployed, he was elected state secretary of the New Jersey chapter.

In 1936, Breitman followed the WPUS when it merged into the Socialist Party of America (SPA). He then left the SPA in December 1937 to become a founding member of the Socialist Workers Party (SWP). He was elected to the SWP's governing National Committee for the first time in 1939 and served continuously in that position until 1981. He was frequently a member of the SWP's Political Committee, which oversaw the organization's day-to-day operations.

Breitman was a political candidate ten times on the SWP ticket. He ran for offices ranging from New Jersey State Assembly to the United States Senate to presidential elector for Michigan. His four unsuccessful bids to be U.S. Senator from New Jersey occurred in 1940, 1942, 1948, and 1954.

Following the departure of Max Shachtman and his political associates to form a new Workers Party, Breitman was named editor of the SWP's weekly paper, The Militant. He held that post from 1941 until 1943 when he was drafted into the U.S. Army and sent to France. In 1945, the French government recognized Breitman's wartime contributions, awarding him the Croix de Guerre avec Etoile de Bronze (War Cross with Bronze Star) for exceptional service rendered during the liberation of France.

After the war, Breitman was once again named editor of The Militant, handling those duties from 1946 to 1954. In March 1946, he participated in the first post-war conference of the Fourth International, held in Paris. He was arrested at the meeting along with other participants but was quickly released, owing to his American citizenship. He wrote prolifically during his tenure as editor of The Militant, supplying over 500 articles for the paper from 1947 to 1955.

In 1954, Breitman and his wife Dorothea moved to Detroit, where for the next 13 years they served as SWP District Organizers. They helped set up the "Friday Night Socialist Forum" (later called the "Militant Labor Forum"), a weekly lecture series that attracted activists from labor, radical, and black liberation groups. To pay the bills, Breitman worked as a printer and proofreader for the Detroit Free Press. As such, he was a member of the International Typographical Union.

Although he came of age politically in the 1930s, Breitman was enthusiastic about the New Left ferment of the 1960s, which he saw as a harbinger of a coming social upheaval. He predicted it would have a "combined character" (a term coined by SWP member Jack Barnes), that merged a socialist revolution of the working class with the equality struggles of "specially oppressed" groups such as Blacks, Latinos, women, and gays. Breitman characterized the political movements of the 1960s as constituting a "New Radicalization"—the title of a pamphlet he wrote in 1971—that was deeper and broader than America's previous radical movements such as Civil War-era Abolitionism and the industrial worker militancy of the 1930s.

Beginning in 1981, Breitman became embroiled in a factional dispute within the SWP. In his view, there was an unhealthy trend in the SWP toward "a politics focused on Castro's leadership of the Cuban Communist Party." This dispute ultimately led in 1984 to Breitman's expulsion from the SWP on charges of "disloyalty".

While battling illness in the mid-1980s, he played a leading role in founding the Fourth Internationalist Tendency, which sought to unify U.S. supporters of the Fourth International. He was a contributing editor of the group's journal, Bulletin in Defense of Marxism.

=== Author and publisher ===
Breitman wrote and edited over a dozen books and pamphlets. He often used pseudonyms, choosing names such as "Albert Parker", "Philip Blake", "Chester Hofla", "Anthony Massini", and "John F. Petrone". Despite the various names used, there were repeating themes in Breitman's writing, one of which was advocacy for African-American equality. He was particularly interested in Malcolm X and the "revolutionary implications of Black nationalism in the U.S." Breitman was instrumental in bringing the slain leader's ideas to the reading public and in shaping his legacy. Shortly after the February 1965 assassination, Breitman edited a selection of speeches delivered in the last eight months of Malcolm's life. The book, Malcolm X Speaks (1965), was an attempt, as Breitman stated in his foreword:

to present...the major ideas Malcolm expounded and defended during his last year. Convinced that Malcolm will be the subject of much study and many controversies in the years to come – by activists in the black freedom struggle as well as historians, scholars and students – we believe that the present book will serve as an invaluable source of material for their studies and disputes, and that it will correct, at least partially, some misconceptions about one of the most misunderstood and misrepresented men of our time.

Breitman continued his focus on Malcolm's late political development in a follow-up 1967 book, The Last Year of Malcolm X: The Evolution of a Revolutionary. Eric Cummins writes in his history of California's radical prison movement that The Last Year of Malcolm X was smuggled into San Quentin State Prison, where it influenced men such as George Jackson and Eldridge Cleaver:

Breitman's Malcolm X was a very different leader than the one portrayed in the final pages of Alex Haley's best-selling Autobiography of Malcolm X. Whether his portrait was more or less accurate than Haley's, for San Quentin readers the effect of the Breitman book was like a lightning strike. No longer would Muslims or other groups of radical black San Quentin inmates petition for collective civil rights within the prison or the American system. There was nothing to be gained in trying to fit in. The very structure of the society would have to be razed and rebuilt along socialist lines.

In the late 1960s, Breitman relocated from Detroit to New York to take the helm of the SWP's publishing arm, Pathfinder Press. In that capacity, he edited a 14-volume collection entitled Writings of Leon Trotsky, 1929–1940, which was published in installments from 1969 to 1979. Breitman was also involved in publishing the writings of SWP leader James P. Cannon.

=== Personal life ===
In 1940, Breitman married Dorothea Katz (1914–2004).

In his later decades, he suffered from numerous ailments, including rheumatoid arthritis, ulcers, and cancer. While in his sixties, he had stomach surgery as well as treatment for a life-threatening abscess. To maintain his active correspondence, he would sometimes dictate letters from a hospital bed.

=== Death and legacy ===
George Breitman died of a heart attack on April 19, 1986, at Beekman Downtown Hospital in New York City. He was 70.

The Tamiment Library at New York University holds the Breitman papers. They consist of 30 linear feet of material collected in 63 archival boxes, and are open for use by scholars without restriction.

== Selected works ==
- The Trenton Siege by the Army of Unoccupation. Introduction by John Spain Jr. Trenton, NJ: Workers Alliance of America, n.d. [1936].
- The Fight Against Hagueism: A Program of Action. (Unsigned.) Newark, NJ: Socialist Workers Party, New Jersey District, 1938.
- Defend the Negro Sailors on the U.S.S. Philadelphia. As "Albert Parker." New York: Pioneer Publishers, 1940.
- New Jersey in the 1940 Elections. (Unsigned.) Newark, NJ: Socialist Workers Party, 1940.
- The March on Washington One Year After. As "Albert Parker." New York: Pioneer Publishers, 1942.
- The Struggle for Negro Equality. As "Albert Parker," with John Saunders. New York: Pioneer Publishers, 1943.
- Wartime Crimes of Big Business. New York: Pioneer Publishers, 1943.
- The Jim Crow Murder of Mr. and Mrs. Harry T. Moore. New York: Pioneer Publishers, 1952.
- Anti-Negro Prejudice: When It Began, When It Will End. New York: Pioneer Publishers, 1960.
- How a Minority Can Change Society: The Real Potential of the Afro-American Struggle. New York: Young Socialist Forum, 1964. —Reissued 1971 by Pathfinder Press.
- Malcolm X Speaks: Selected Speeches and Statements. New York: Merit Publishers, 1965.
- Malcolm X: The Man and His Ideas. New York: Pioneer Publishers, 1965.
- Marxism and the Negro Struggle: Articles by Harold Cruse, George Breitman, Clifton DeBerry. With Harold Cruse and Clifton DeBerry. New York: Monad Press, 1965.
- The Last Year of Malcolm X: The Evolution of a Revolutionary. New York: Merit Publishers, 1967.
- Black Nationalism and Socialism. New York: Merit Publishers, 1968.
- Myths About Malcolm X: Two Views. With Albert Cleage. New York: Merit Publishers, 1968.
- The New Radicalization: compared with those of the past. New York: Pathfinder Press, 1971.
- The Rocky Road to the Fourth International, 1933-38. New York: Pathfinder Press, 1979.
- Malcolm X and the Third American Revolution: The Writings of George Breitman. Anthony Marcus, ed. New York: Humanity Books, 2005.

== See also ==
- Bibliography of Malcolm X
- Bibliography of Martin Luther King Jr.
