= H. Alexander Smith =

American politician (1880–1966)

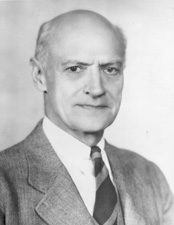

United States Senator from New Jersey
- In office December 7, 1944 – January 3, 1959
- Preceded by: Arthur Walsh
- Succeeded by: Harrison A. Williams

Personal details
- Born: January 30, 1880 New York City, New York, U.S.
- Died: October 27, 1966 (aged 86) Princeton, New Jersey, U.S.
- Party: Republican
- Spouse: Helen Dominick
- Children: 3 (including Helen)
- Education: Princeton University (BA); Columbia University (LLB)

Howard Alexander Smith (January 30, 1880 – October 27, 1966) was an American lawyer and politician. A member of the Republican Party, Smith served as a United States Senator from New Jersey from 1944 to 1959.

== Early life and education ==
H. Alexander Smith was born in New York City to Abram Alexander and Sue Lehn (née Bender) Smith. His father was a physician and teacher. Smith attended the Cutler School in New York, and then enrolled at Princeton University in New Jersey. At Princeton, Smith studied jurisprudence, political science, and English common law under Woodrow Wilson. He graduated with a Bachelor of Arts degree in 1901, and later received a Bachelor of Laws degree from Columbia Law School in 1904.

== Early career ==
In 1904, Smith was admitted to the New York State Bar Association and commenced his practice in New York City, working for the Legal Aid Society. Due to poor health, he moved to Colorado Springs, Colorado, where he continued to practice law until 1917. During World War I, he worked for the United States Food Administration in Colorado and afterwards in Washington, D.C. He moved to New Jersey in 1919, and served as executive secretary (assistant to the president) of Princeton University from 1920 to 1927. He then served as a lecturer in Princeton's department of politics (1927–1930), teaching international relations and foreign policy.

While continuing to live in New Jersey, Smith resumed his practice of law in New York City. He became active in state politics, helping establish the New Jersey Republican Policy Council in 1933 and being appointed treasurer of the New Jersey Republican State Committee in 1934. He was later elected chairman of the Republican State Committee, and served as a member of the Republican National Committee (1942–1943).

== U.S. Senate ==
On November 7, 1944, Smith was elected as a Republican to the United States Senate to fill the vacancy caused by the death of W. Warren Barbour.

Smith was reelected in 1946 and 1952 and served from December 7, 1944 to January 3, 1959. He served as chairman of the Senate Committee on Labor and Public Welfare (1953–1955), and co-authored the Smith–Mundt Act to specify the terms in which the United States government can engage in public diplomacy. He was not a candidate for renomination in 1958, but served as a special consultant on foreign affairs to the US Secretary of State from 1959 to 1960. Smith voted in favor of the Civil Rights Act of 1957.

== Personal life and death ==
Smith married Helen Dominick, whom he met during his time at Columbia, in 1902; the couple had two daughters and a son.

Smith was the uncle of Peter H. Dominick, who was a U.S. Senator from Colorado from 1963 to 1975.

Smith died in Princeton at age 86. He is buried in Princeton Cemetery.

U.S. Senate
| Preceded by Arthur Walsh | U.S. senator (Class 1) from New Jersey; 1944–1959; Served alongside: Albert W. Hawkes, Robert C. Hendrickson, Clifford P. Case | Succeeded by Harrison A. Williams |
Party political offices
| Preceded by Clayton E. Freeman | Chairman of the New Jersey Republican State Committee; 1941–1943 | Succeeded by Lloyd B. Marsh |
| Preceded by W. Warren Barbour | Republican Nominee for the U.S. Senate (Class 1) from New Jersey; 1944, 1946, 1952 | Succeeded by Robert Kean |
