= 1954 United States Senate election in New Jersey =

- November 2, 1954
- Turnout: 71% (▼12pp)
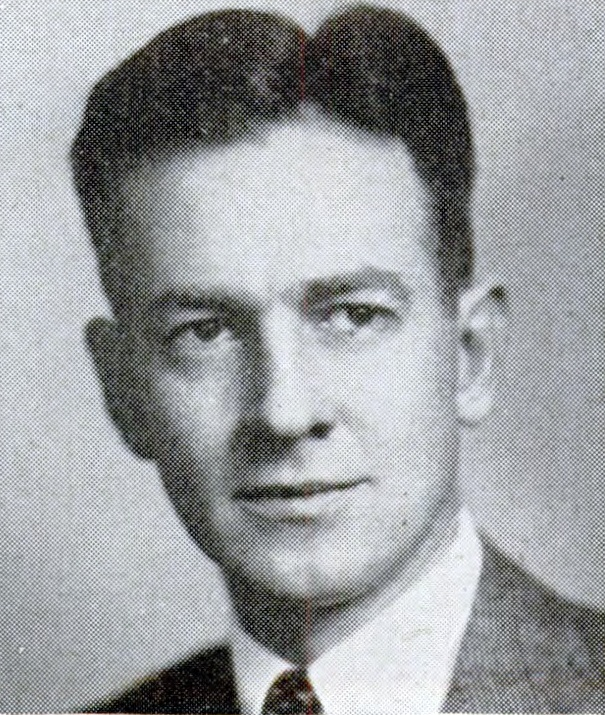

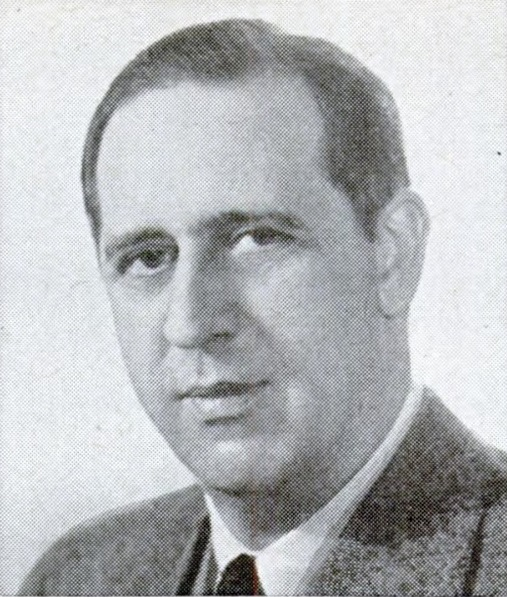
Nominee	Clifford P. Case	Charles R. Howell
Party	Republican	Democratic
Popular vote	861,528	858,158
Percentage	48.66%	48.47%
- County results Case: 50–60% 60–70% Howell: 40–50% 50–60% 60–70%
U.S. senator before election
Robert C. Hendrickson
Republican
Elected U.S. Senator
Clifford P. Case
Republican

The 1954 United States Senate election in New Jersey was held on November 2, 1954. Republican U.S. Representative Clifford P. Case defeated Democratic U.S. Representative Charles R. Howell with 48.66% of the vote.

This election was decided by the fewest votes (3,507) and narrowest percentage margin (0.19%) in New Jersey history.

== Background ==
During the 1950s, New Jersey was considered a political battleground and microcosm of national politics. As a heavily industrialized state with a substantial organized labor movement, the state tended to favor the Democratic Party, which centered on the declining political machine which had been led for many years by Jersey City boss Frank Hague. However, in the 1952 election of President Dwight D. Eisenhower, the professional class of New York City and Philadelphia commuters scored a major victory for the Republican Party. A smaller element of Republicans, who supported Senator Joseph McCarthy of Wisconsin in his crusade against communism, centered on Hudson County.

In 1953, the Republican Party lost the New Jersey gubernatorial election for the first time since 1940.

== Republican primary ==
=== Candidates ===
- Clifford Case, director of the Ford Foundation Fund for the Republic and former U.S. representative from Rahway

==== Withdrew ====
- Robert C. Hendrickson, incumbent Senator since 1949 (withdrew March 10, 1954)
- Walter Margetts Jr., former New Jersey Treasurer (withdrew March 17, 1954)

==== Declined ====
- Malcolm Forbes, state senator for Somerset County and candidate for governor in 1953
- Peter Frelinghuysen Jr., U.S. representative from Morristown
- Robert W. Kean, U.S. representative from Livingston
- Bruce Palmer, Newark insurance executive
- Bernard M. Shanley, advisor to President Dwight D. Eisenhower
- David Van Alstyne, former state senator for Bergen County (declined in January 1954)

=== Campaign ===
Incumbent Robert C. Hendrickson announced his campaign for a second term in office on December 31, 1953, frankly admitting that he sought to preempt a potential primary challenge. However, party leaders soon began exerting pressure on Hendrickson to withdraw in favor of a stronger candidate. Many favored U.S. Representative Robert Kean of Livingston, the scion of New Jersey's most eminent political family, and he publicly claimed he had been assured of "a great deal of support throughout North Jersey" against Hendrickson, a South Jersey native. Another potential challenger, Malcolm Forbes, had made a strong primary campaign for governor in 1953 but was unable to gain party support and preferred to focus on his goal of becoming governor.

By mid-February, Hendrickson appeared to be the underdog for his own seat, as party leaders met to determine a replacement and agreed to secure Hendrickson a state or federal appointment in exchange for his withdrawal. Kean had been surpassed in the race for establishment support by former U.S. representative Clifford P. Case, who had resigned from his Democratic-leaning seat to join the Ford Foundation after a failed run for governor in 1953. Case's proven record in winning a Democratic seat made him an attractive nominee to party insiders in the wake of the party's 1953 defeat. The Essex County organization continued to favor Kean, who was endorsed by state senator Mark Anton and Speaker of the U.S. House Joseph W. Martin Jr. at the party's annual Lincoln Day dinner in February. Other Republican leaders put forward former state treasurer Walter Margetts Jr. of Passaic.

The three potential challengers were expected to defer to party leadership, with only one actually entering the race against Hendrickson. However, on February 24, Margetts entered the race unilaterally, declaring that Hendrickson's record was "open to serious challenge". Party chair Samuel L. Bodine expressed concern on behalf of the Eisenhower administration that a contested primary would harm Republican chances in the general election, but Margetts rejected the suggestion; while Case and Kean remained non-committal, allies of each man expected them to join the campaign within the week.

Case finally announced his candidacy on March 5, resigning from the Fund for the Republic. His announcement was met with opposition from his own Union County organization, where Assembly speaker G. Clifford Thomas and state senator Kenneth Hand said they had not been consulted, and both indicated they favored Hendrickson.

On March 10, the day before the primary filing deadline, Hendrickson withdrew from the race only hours after his office said he would remain a candidate. He attributed his decision to "a feeling that I have neglected the political fences and failed to fulfill the necessary speaking engagements which are expected of one in public office. I am charged with neglect in spite of my deep conviction that my first duty to the people was to stay on the job here in Washington, attending to my official responsibilities." Margetts withdrew hours before the March 17 withdrawal deadline, reversing his previous position and leaving Case unopposed for the nomination.

=== Results ===
Case was unopposed for the Republican nomination.

1954 Republican Senate primary
Party	Candidate	Votes	%
Republican	Clifford Case	336,514	100.00%
Total votes		336,514	100.00%

== Democratic primary ==
=== Candidates ===
- Charles R. Howell, U.S. Representative from Pennington

==== Withdrew ====
- Salvatore A. Bontempo, Newark City Commissioner (withdrew March 15, 1954)

==== Declined ====
- Archibald S. Alexander, New Jersey Treasurer and nominee for U.S. Senate in 1948 and 1952
- Dwight R. G. Palmer, Short Hills industrialist and president of General Cable Corporation

=== Campaign ===
Archibald S. Alexander, the Democratic nominee in each of New Jersey's prior two elections for U.S. Senator, was initially expected to be unopposed for a third nomination. However, on the expectation that Republicans would nominate the moderate Clifford Case or Robert Kean in lieu of Hendrickson, the party sought a stronger candidate. Initially, party leaders appeared to unanimously support Dwight R. G. Palmer of Short Hills, but Palmer said he would not oppose Alexander if the latter wanted the nomination. By February 22, with less than three weeks remaining before the March 11 filing deadline, neither the Republican nor Democratic party could decide on a candidate, each waiting for the other to move first in what The New York Times described as a "Gaston-Alphonse act".

By March, with a contested primary appearing likely on the Republican side and Alexander and Palmer refusing to be candidates, the party settled on U.S. representative Charles R. Howell.

Newark city commissioner Salvatore Bontempo briefly challenged Howell for the nomination but withdrew on March 15, following a two-hour conference with Governor Robert B. Meyner, leaving Howell unopposed for the nomination.

=== Results ===
Howell was unopposed for the Democratic nomination.

1954 Democratic Senate primary
Party	Candidate	Votes	%
Democratic	Charles R. Howell	230,250	100.00%
Total votes		230,250	100.00%

== General election ==
=== Candidates ===
- George Breitman (Socialist Workers)
- Clifford P. Case, director of the Ford Foundation Freedom Fund and former U.S. Representative from Rahway (Republican)
- Fred A. Hartley Jr., former U.S. Representative from Kearney (write-in)
- Charles R. Howell, U.S. Representative from Pennington (Democratic)
- Henry B. Krajewski, pig farmer and candidate for president in 1952 and governor in 1953 (American Third Party)
- Albert Ronis (Socialist Labor)

=== Campaign ===
Since Case and Howell were each unopposed in their respective primaries following the March withdrawal deadline, each candidate focused on the November general election.

In the first weeks of the campaign, Case's car was sideswiped near Vineland and he was knocked unconscious.

Corruption scandals played a major role in the campaign, as they had in the 1953 race for governor. While traditionally, Republicans and reformers had joined forces against the Frank Hague machine in Jersey City as the seat of corruption in New Jersey, recent scandals in the Republican Party and the reform reputation of Governor Robert B. Meyner had flipped the issue on Case.

During the campaign, Case openly criticized Senator Joseph McCarthy, and pledged to vote against seating McCarthy on any committee with investigative functions. McCarthy's supporters called him "a pro-Communist Republicrat" and "Stalin's choice for Senator." The Newark Star-Ledger quoted former Communist Party leader Bella Dodd as saying that Case's sister Adelaide was "an active member of several Communist front groups." It was later revealed, however, that the Adelaide Case in question was not the candidate's sister but a college professor who had died in 1948.

In September, a conservative faction within the Republican Party led by James P. Selvage, a former press agent for the National Association of Manufacturers, unsuccessfully appealed to President Eisenhower and Senator H. Alexander Smith to force Case off the ballot, charging that he was both a weak candidate and too liberal for the Republican Party, citing his associations with the Congress of Industrial Organizations and the Americans for Democratic Action. In response, however, Eisenhower and Vice President Richard M. Nixon endorsed Case at a visit to the White House. The Selvage faction proposed a write-in campaign for former U.S. Representative Fred A. Hartley, Jr., co-author of the Taft-Hartley Act.

=== Results ===
1954 United States Senate election in New Jersey
Party	Candidate	Votes	%	±%
Republican	Clifford P. Case	861,528	48.66%	▼1.33
Democratic	Charles R. Howell	858,158	48.47%	▲1.17
Independent	Henry B. Krajewski	35,421	2.00%	N/A
Independent	Fred A. Hartley, Jr. (write-in)	7,025	0.40%	N/A
Socialist Labor	Albert Ronis	4,832	0.27%	▲0.06
Socialist Workers	George Breitman	3,590	0.20%	▼0.23
Republican hold		Swing		
Total votes		1,770,554	100.00%	
