= Paul J. Krebs =

American politician

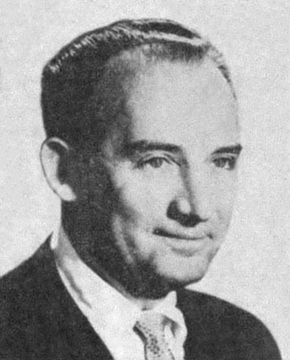

Member of the U.S. House of Representatives from New Jersey's 12th district
- In office January 3, 1965 – January 3, 1967
- Preceded by: George M. Wallhauser
- Succeeded by: Florence P. Dwyer

New Jersey Director of Consumer Affairs
- In office 1967–1970
- Appointed by: Richard J. Hughes
- Succeeded by: Millicent Fenwick

Personal details
- Born: May 26, 1912 New York City, New York, U.S.
- Died: September 17, 1996 (aged 84) Hallandale, Florida, U.S.
- Party: Democratic

Paul Joseph Krebs (May 26, 1912 – September 17, 1996) was an American labor organizer and Democratic Party politician from New Jersey who represented Newark and suburban Essex County in the United States House of Representatives from 1965 to 1967. He was the Democratic nominee for United States Senate in 1972, but he lost to incumbent Clifford P. Case.

== Labor organizer (1950–54) ==
Krebs served as political director of the New Jersey United Auto Workers (UAW) from 1950 to 1954.

In 1954, Carl Holderman resigned as president of the New Jersey Congress of Industrial Organizations (CIO) to become New Jersey Commissioner of Labor. Krebs outmaneuvered Joel Jacobson, president of the Essex-West Hudson CIO and a more militant advocate for social causes, to succeed Holderman. Governor Robert Meyner later appointed Holderman to the Rutgers University board of governors over Krebs.

After the merger of the national CIO with the American Federation of Labor to form the AFL-CIO, Krebs and Jacobson again competed to serve as vice president of the organization under former AFL president Louis Marciante and Vincent J. Murphy. The inaugural New Jersey AFL-CIO election became so contentious that George Meany threatened to seize control of the New Jersey organization and appoint its leadership himself. The merger was ultimately postponed, with Jacobson usurping Krebs as CIO president, and Krebs leading the UAW in a walkout. Krebs would serve as UAW president from 1961 to 1965.

== Political career ==
=== U.S. House of Representatives (1965–67) ===
In 1964, Krebs leveraged his friendship with Essex County Democratic organization chair Dennis Carey to secure the Democratic nomination for Congress in New Jersey's 12th congressional district. The district had been represented by retiring incumbent George M. Wallhauser, a Republican, for three terms and consisted of parts of Newark and suburban towns in Essex County. Krebs faced David Wiener, the Essex County surrogate and popular county politician, in the general election. He defeated Wiener by ten thousand votes on the coattails of Lyndon B. Johnson, who received over 70 percent of the vote in Essex.

Although Krebs had won a seat in Congress, his tenure was short-lived. To comply with the 1964 Supreme Court ruling in Wesberry v. Sanders, the New Jersey legislature drew new districts ahead of the 1966 elections. In order to equalize the population between the state's districts, a new district was added to Camden County in South Jersey, and Krebs's district was eliminated. His hometown of Livingston was moved to the neighboring Union County-based district of incumbent Florence P. Dwyer; Krebs declined to run for re-election.

=== New Jersey Director of Consumer Affairs ===
After retiring from Congress, Krebs was appointed as New Jersey Director of Consumer Affairs by Richard J. Hughes. He also served as a consultant to municipal governments and had a contract with the Essex County board of chosen freeholders.

=== 1972 U.S. Senate campaign ===
In 1972, Krebs ran as the party-endorsed candidate in the race for United States Senator. He defeated advertising executive Daniel Gaby, a supporter of George McGovern, in the primary. In the general election against popular incumbent Clifford P. Case, Krebs had little support, and even his former union endorsed Case. Krebs only received 35 percent of the vote; as of 2026, he is the most recent Democratic nominee to lose a race for United States Senate in New Jersey.

=== 1974 U.S. House campaign ===
Krebs made his final run for office in 1974, when ran for the House again, seeking the open seat of Republican incumbent Peter Frelinghuysen Jr. In the Democratic primary, he faced former Lyndon B. Johnson aide and television broadcaster Frederick Bohen, who had been the party nominee against Frelinghuysen in 1972. Krebs attacked Bohen as a moderate who had canceled a broadcast critical of Johnson. Although Krebs had the Essex County organization's endorsement, Bohen won the primary with 49 percent of the vote to Krebs's 18 percent. Krebs only narrowly carried Livingston. Bohen lost the general election to Millicent Fenwick.

In 1978, Krebs endorsed John Cryan for Essex County Executive. He served as an early mentor to Livingston mayor David Wildstein, a Republican.

== Personal life and death ==
Krebs died in September 1996 in Hallandale, Florida.

Party political offices
Preceded by Warren W. Wilentz	Democratic Nominee for the U.S. Senate (Class 2) from New Jersey; 1972	Succeeded by Bill Bradley
