= Holleran =

Holleran is a surname. Notable people with the surname include:

- Andrew Holleran, pseudonym of Eric Garber (born 1943), writer
- Demer Holleran, American squash player
- Thomas J. Holleran (1906–1984), American politician
- Tommy Holleran (1897-1930), American footballer
