= 1972 New Jersey Democratic presidential primary =

1972 New Jersey Democratic presidential primaries
- June 6, 1972
- Presidential delegate primary

109 Democratic National Convention delegates

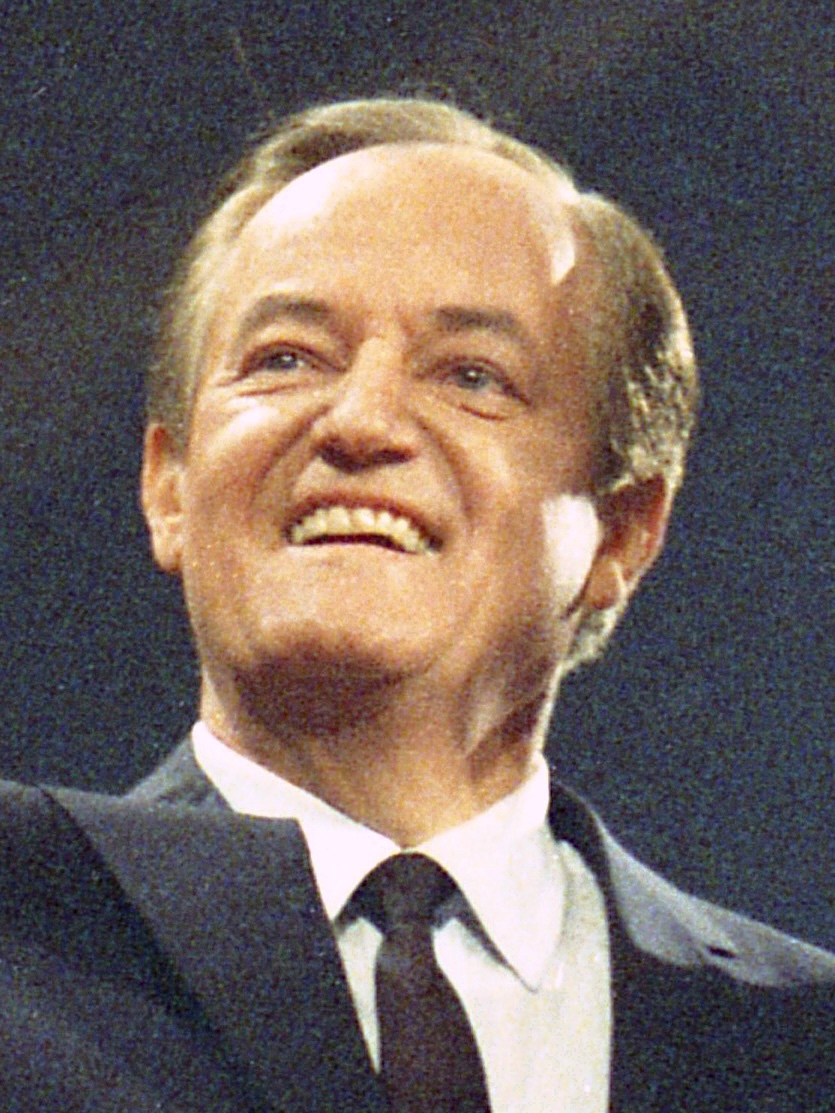
Candidate	George McGovern	Uncommitted	Hubert Humphrey
Home state	South Dakota		Minnesota
Delegate count	73	27	9
Popular vote	211,771	90,544	172,383
Percentage	53.3%	3.3%	43.4%
- Presidential preference primary (non-binding)

No Democratic National Convention delegates
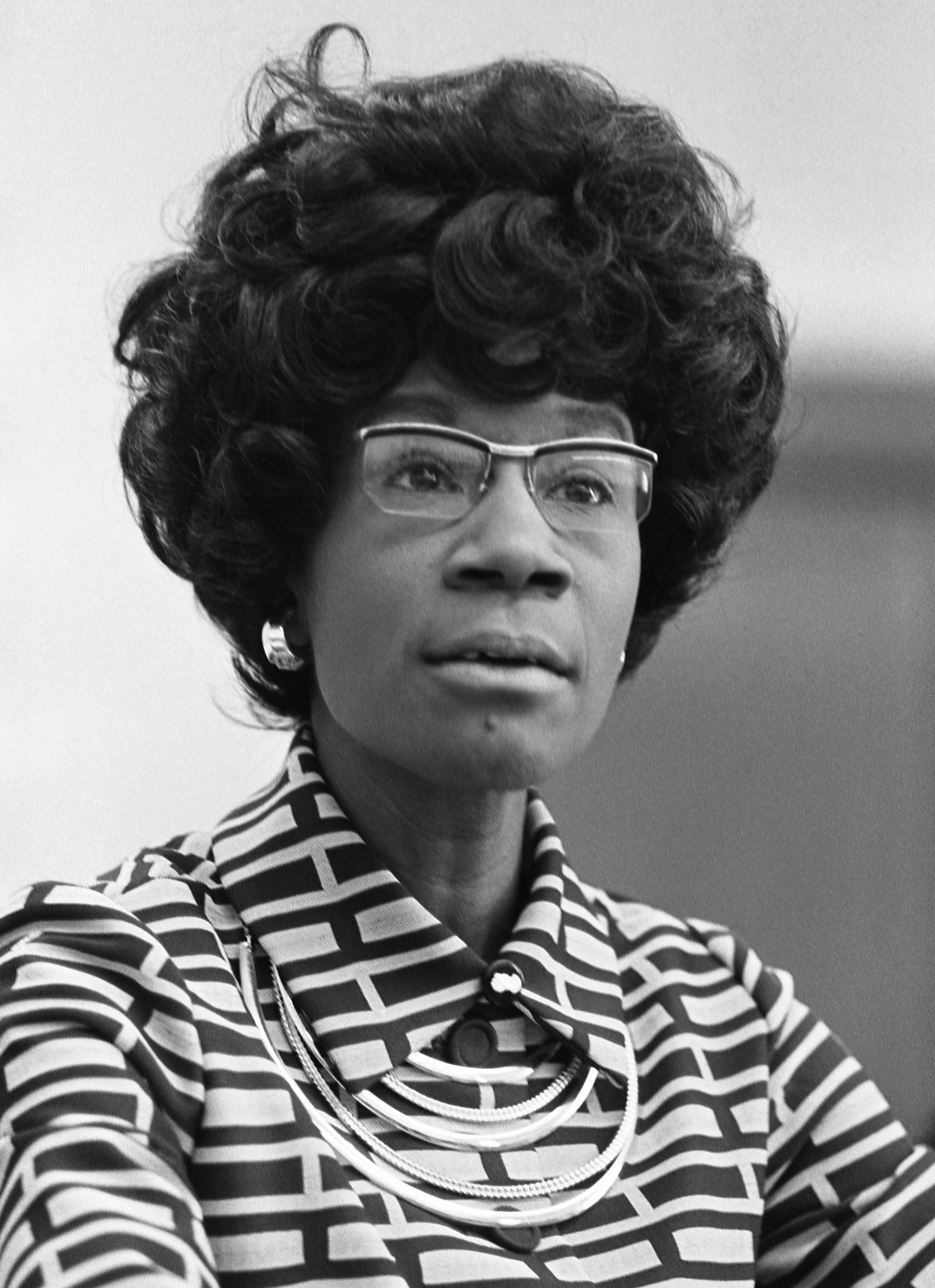

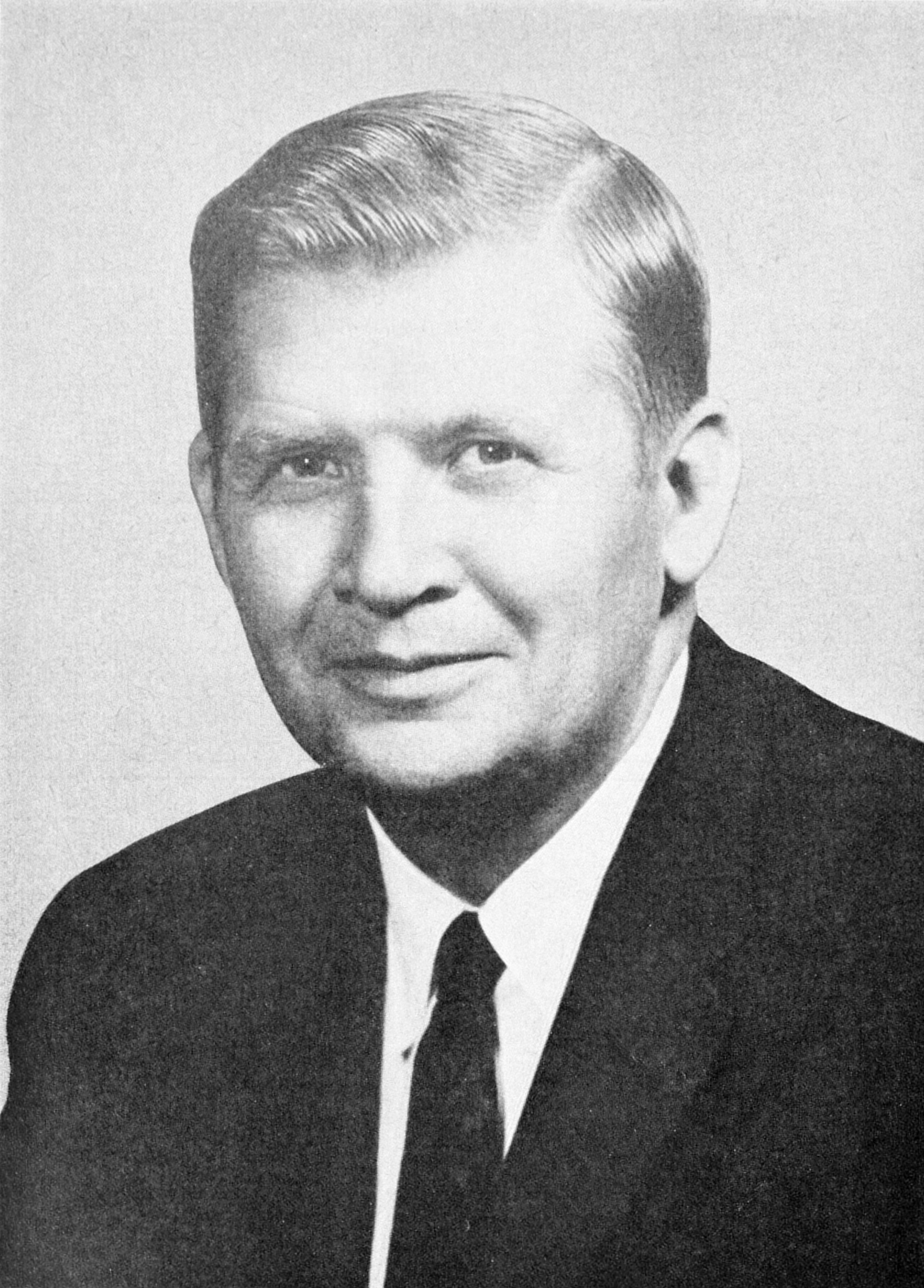
Candidate	Shirley Chisholm	Terry Sanford
Home state	New York	North Carolina
Popular vote	51,433	25,401
Percentage	66.9%	33.1%
- Results by county Chisholm: 50–60% 60–70% 70–80% 80–90% Sanford: 60–70%

The 1972 New Jersey Democratic presidential primary was held on June 6, 1972, in New Jersey as one of the Democratic Party's statewide nomination contests ahead of the 1972 United States presidential election.

In the binding delegate primary, candidates pledged to support George McGovern at the 1972 Democratic National Convention won contests for delegates at-large and most of the county races. Delegates pledged to support Hubert H. Humphrey carried Camden and Ocean counties, while slates of delegates not committed to any candidate won in Atlantic, Essex, Hudson, Salem and Warren counties.

In the non-binding preference primary, only Shirley Chisholm and Terry Sanford appeared on the ballot. Chisholm won the contest, becoming the first woman to win a statewide presidential nominating contest for a major party, as well as being the second African-American winner after Walter Fauntroy's win in the Washington D.C. contest of the same year. Neither of the candidates in the preference primary won delegates from the contest, although Chisholm fielded delegate candidates in several counties, and it was largely ignored by New Jersey voters, with the combined total vote for Chisholm and Sanford well below that cast for McGovern or Humphrey alone in the statewide delegate contest.

Over 575,078 ballots were cast, the highest recorded for a Democratic presidential primary in New Jersey at the time, and in combination with the Republican primary held the same day, a higher percentage of eligible voters (26.2%) cast a ballot in the 1972 primaries than in any presidential year since 1952 (39%). Turnout was highest in Essex (37.5%) and Hudson (37.8%) counties, where the primary presented voters a referendum on local party machine leaders.

== Candidates ==
=== Binding delegate primary ===
- Shirley Chisholm, U.S. Representative from New York's 12th district (1969–1983)
- Hubert Humphrey, U.S. Senator from Minnesota and former Vice President of the United States
- George McGovern, U.S. Senator from South Dakota
- Edmund Muskie, U.S. Senator from Maine
- George Wallace, Governor of Alabama

=== Non-binding preference primary ===
- Shirley Chisholm, U.S. Representative from New York's 12th district (1969–1983)
- Terry Sanford, Governor of North Carolina (1961–1965)

== Endorsements ==
Shirley Chisholm

Individuals

- Donald Kofi Tucker, Air Force veteran and civil rights activist (ran for county delegate)
Hubert Humphrey

U.S. executive branch officials

- John T. Connor, chairman and CEO of Allied Chemical and former U.S. Secretary of Commerce (ran for county delegate)

U.S. congressmembers

- Charles R. Howell, former U.S. representative for New Jersey's 4th congressional district (ran for county delegate)

State legislators

- William J. Bate, state senator (ran for delegate at-large)
- William F. Kelly Jr., state senator (ran for delegate at-large)
- Joseph A. Maressa, state senator (ran for county delegate)
- John J. Sinsimer, assemblyman (ran for county delegate)

Local officials

- Philip N. Gumbs, member of the Aberdeen Township council (ran for county alternate)

Party officials

- Salvatore A. Bontempo, chair of the New Jersey Democratic Party (ran for delegate at-large)

Individuals

- Carol Norcross, wife of labor leader George Norcross Jr. and matriarch of the Norcross political family (ran for county delegate)
George McGovern

State legislators

- Ann Klein, assemblywoman (ran for county delegate)

Local officials

- Anne Elise Thompson, Lawrence municipal prosecutor (ran for county delegate)

Party officials

- Anne Clark Martindell, vice chair of the New Jersey Democratic State Committee (ran for county delegate)
- Loretta Weinberg, chair of the District 13B Democratic Party (ran for county delegate)

Individuals

- Frank Askin, Rutgers Law School professor (ran for county delegate)
- Jim Bouton, author and former New York Yankees pitcher (ran for county delegate)
- Abby Rubenfeld, Princeton University student (ran for county alternate)
- Eli Sagan, businessman and political financier (ran for delegate at-large)
- Gerald Stockman, Trenton attorney (ran for county delegate)
Edmund Muskie

Local officials

- Daniel Joseph O'Hern, mayor of Red Bank (ran for county delegate)
- Bucky Leggett, member of the Trenton city council (ran for county delegate)
- Anthony Scardino, mayor of Lyndurst (ran for county delegate)

Individuals

- Garret Hobart IV, Morristown attorney and great-grandson of Vice President of the United States Garret Hobart (ran for county delegate)
Uncommitted

U.S. congressmembers

- Dominick V. Daniels, U.S. representative for New Jersey's 14th congressional district (ran for county delegate)
- James J. Howard, U.S. representative for New Jersey's 3rd congressional district (ran for county delegate)

State legislators

- James P. Dugan, state senator (ran for county delegate)
- David Friedland, assemblyman (ran for county delegate)
- Christopher Jackman, assemblyman (ran for county delegate)
- Joseph McGahn, state senator (ran for county delegate)
- Wynona Lipman, state senator (ran for county delegate)
- Robert Wilentz, former assemblyman (ran for county delegate)

Local officials

- Angelo Cifelli, Hudson County Freeholder (ran for county delegate)
- Bernard J. Dwyer, mayor of Edison
- Kenneth A. Gibson, mayor of Newark (ran for county delegate)
- Sharpe James, member of the Newark City Council (ran for county delegate)
- Paul T. Jordan, mayor of Jersey City (ran for county delegate)
- Barbara Kalik, member of the Willingboro Township council (ran for county delegate)
- Philip Keegan, Essex County Freeholder and executive director of the Young Democrats of America (ran for county delegate)
- Paul Kiernan, former mayor of Long Branch (ran for county delegate)
- Raymond Zane, Gloucester County Freeholder (ran for county delegate)

Party officials

- Steve Adubato Sr., chair of the Newark North Ward Democratic Party (ran for county delegate)
- George W. Lee, chair of the Burlington County Democratic Committee (ran for county delegate)

Individuals

- Leonard E. Baum, mathematician (ran for county delegate)
- John P. Caufield, former Newark Fire Department director and candidate for mayor in 1970 (ran for county delegate)
- Thomas F. Cowan, Jersey City laborer and union organizer (ran for county delegate)
- Lewis B. Kaden, anti-war activist and candidate for U.S. House in 1970 (ran for county delegate)
- Patrick McGahn, Atlantic City attorney (ran for county delegate)
- Thomas H. Paterniti, Edison dentist (ran for county alternate)
- Ariel A. Rodriguez, Rutgers Law School student (ran for county delegate)
- John F. Russo, assistant Ocean County prosecutor (ran for county delegate)

== Results ==
=== Preference primary results ===
1972 New Jersey presidential preference primary
Party	Candidate	Votes	%
Democratic	Shirley Chisholm	51,433	66.94%
Democratic	Terry Sanford	25,401	33.06%
Total votes		76,834	100.00%

=== Delegate primary results ===
Delegate slate	Candidate	Delegate candidates		Delegates		Aggregate votes	
Delegate slate	Candidate	State	County	Total	Of total (%)	Total	Of total (%)
McGovern for President	George McGovern	7	102	73	66.97	3,084,328	48.27
Humphrey for President	Hubert Humphrey	7	85	9	8.26	1,712,124	26.80
Other/Uncommitted		4	110	27	24.77	1,415,068	22.15
Chisholm for President	Shirley Chisholm	0	79	0	0.0	125,339	1.96
Muskie for President	Edmund Muskie	0	37	0	0.0	47,665	0.75
Committed to Alabama Governor	George Wallace	0	5	0	0.0	4,632	0.07
Total		18	418	109	100.0	6,389,156	100.00
Registered voters, and turnout							

==== Delegate primary results by contest ====
1972 New Jersey Democratic primary
Contest	Delegates and popular vote							Total
Contest	McGovern	Uncommitted (Note: Uncommitted totals in the county elections are the totals of the top slate of uncommitted delegate candidates. Additional delegate candidates are listed under "other".)	Humphrey	Chisholm	Muskie	Wallace	Other	Total
Delegates at-large	7; 1,482,398 (53.31%)	90,544 (3.26%)	1,206,685 (43.41%)	—N/a	—N/a	—N/a	—N/a	2,779,627
Atlantic	6,658 (31.67%)	3; 11,377 (54.11%)	—N/a	922 (4.39%)	—N/a	—N/a	2,067 (9.83%)	21,024
Bergen	13; 420,080 (66.78%)	—N/a	169,590 (26.87%)	28,545 (4.54%)	8,049 (1.28%)	—N/a	2,817 (0.45%)	629,081
Burlington	4; 27,560 (51.83%)	24,629 (46.32%)	—N/a	—N/a	—N/a	—N/a	984 (1.85%)	53,173
Camden	80,835 (46.72%)	—N/a	7; 92,172 (53.28%)	—N/a	—N/a	—N/a	—N/a	173,007
Cape May	1; 910 (49.48%)	464 (25.23%)	—N/a	—N/a	—N/a	—N/a	465 (25.29%)	1,839
Cumberland	2; 3,984 (43.96%)	1,659 (18.31%)	3,420 (37.74%)	—N/a	—N/a	—N/a	—N/a	9,063
Essex	1; 427,403 (42.69%)	13; 489,521 (48.89%)	—N/a	45,034 (4.50%)	—N/a	—N/a	39,293 (3.92%) (Note: 35,747 votes for "Independent Uncommitted Democrats", a slate led by Newark mayor Kenneth A. Gibson, and 3,546 for "For a United Democratic Party", a partial slate led by Julius Schechter.)	1,001,251
Gloucester	2; 6,321 (49.16%)	5,822 (45.28%)	—N/a	—N/a	—N/a	—N/a	715 (5.56%)	12,858
Hudson	92,851 (12.94%)	6; 296,053 (41.26%)	—N/a	16,417 (2.29%)	21,619 (3.01%)	—N/a	3; 290,557 (40.50%) (Note: 285,476 votes (39.79%) and 3 delegates for "Regular Democratic Organization", a slate led by Dominick V. Daniels, and 5,081 (0.71%) for "Action Democrats".)	717,497
Hunterdon	1; 1,642 (47.96%)	1,168 (34.11%)	614 (17.93%)	—N/a	—N/a	—N/a	—N/a	3,424
Mercer	5; 54,751 (64.40%)	2,619 (3.08%)	17,834 (20.98%)	6,502 (7.65%)	3,307 (3.89%)	—N/a	—N/a	85,013
Middlesex	8; 134,035 (45.72%)	98,855 (33.72%)	60,303 (20.56%)	—N/a	—N/a	—N/a	—N/a	293,193
Monmouth	6; 60,476 (48.56%)	29,561 (23.74%)	26,499 (21.28%)	4,203 (3.37%)	3,327 (2.67%)	—N/a	477 (0.38%)	124,543
Morris	5; 51,655 (58.84%)	2,739 (3.12%)	18,097 (20.61%)	4,804 (5.47%)	5,867 (6.68%)	4,632 (5.28%)	—N/a	87,794
Ocean	1; 10,314 (35.14%)	6,445 (21.96%)	2; 11,214 (38.21%)	—N/a	—N/a	—N/a	1,375 (4.69%) (Note: 906 votes for a slate without a slogan led by Margaret Zinkin, 246 for Gaetano J. Alaimo, running with the slogan "Uncommitted Demeocrat for Draft," and 221 for Jo Ann Pietro, running with the slogan "Fresh Hope Through the New Democrats".)	29,348
Passaic	6; 46,949 (49.89%)	5,505 (5.85%)	28,836 (30.64%)	3,994 (4.24%)	5,158 (5.48%)	—N/a	3,658 (3.89%) (Note: All 3,658 votes cast for Walter F. Hoffmann running with the slogan, "Democrat for a Stronger United Nations".)	94,100
Salem	858 (36.78%)	1; 1,475 (63.22%)	—N/a	—N/a	—N/a	—N/a	—N/a	2,333
Somerset	2; 11,035 (65.24%)	736 (4.35%) (Note: All 736 votes for a slate running with the slogan "The John F. Kennedy Tradition".)	3,928 (23.22%)	1,215 (7.18%)	—N/a	—N/a	—N/a	16,914
Sussex	1; 1,792 (53.65%)	—N/a	1,048 (31.38%)	162 (4.85%)	338 (10.12%)	—N/a	—N/a	3,340
Union	8; 160,102 (64.81%)	—N/a	71,884 (29.10%)	13,541 (5.48%)	—N/a	—N/a	1,503 (0.61%)	247,030
Warren	1,719 (46.41%)	1; 1,985 (53.59%)	—N/a	—N/a	—N/a	—N/a	—N/a	3,704
County subtotal (Note: Because counties with larger populations were allotted multiple delegates, elected individually, each voter in those counties cast multiple ballots. The subtotal is therefore disproportionately skewed in favor of those counties.)	66 1,601,930 (44.38%)	24 980,613 (27.17%)	9 505,439 (14.00%)	125,339 (3.47%)	47,665 (1.32%)	4,632 (0.13%)	3 343,911 (9.53%)	3,609,529
