= Wilentz =

Wilentz may refer to:

== People ==
- Amy Wilentz, American author
- Sean Wilentz (b. 1951), Sidney and Ruth Lapidus Professor of History at Princeton University
- Robert Wilentz (1927–1996), Chief Justice of the New Jersey Supreme Court from 1979 to 1996
- David T. Wilentz (1894–1988), Attorney General of New Jersey from 1934 to 1944
- Warren W. Wilentz (1924-2010) an American lawyer and Democratic politician from New Jersey
