= John W. Suling =

American lawyer

John William Suling (December 8, 1880 - June 16, 1966) was an American Democratic Party politician who was twice the Democratic nominee for the U.S. House of Representatives in New Jersey's 12th congressional district.

Suling was a 1900 graduate of City College of New York and received his law degree from Columbia University Law School in 1902. He spent 48 years as a lawyer for the Folsom Corporation, a New York City insurance and real estate firm. A resident of Montclair, New Jersey, he was a member of the Essex County Democratic Committee.

He became involved in politics in 1932 when he served as Campaign Manager for W.I. Lincoln Adams, who was elected Montclair Town Commissioner.

In 1934, Suling became a candidate for Congress in the 12th district of New Jersey, seeking to challenge Republican incumbent Frederick R. Lehlbach. All three candidates in the Democratic primary used the name of President Franklin D. Roosevelt in their ballot slogans: Suling ran as "Regular Roosevelt Democrat"; Charles P. McCann ran as "Roosevelt Democrat"; and William A. Hughes ran with "Back the Man Who Backs Roosevelt". McCann won the Democratic nomination, but lost the General Election to Lehlbach.

Suling ran again for Congress in 1944, this time against Republican incumbent Robert Kean. Endorsed by the Essex County Democratic Committee, he was unopposed in the Democratic primary. Nationally, Americans rallied behind Allied success in World War II, and in turn voted favorably for the administration's course of action. Running on a ticket with President Roosevelt, Sulig gave Kean the closest re-election campaign of his 20-year career in Congress. Kean won by just 4,593 votes, 67,680 (50.59%) to 63,087 (47.16%).
