= 1972 United States Senate election in New Jersey =

- November 7, 1972
- Turnout: 84% (▲13pp)
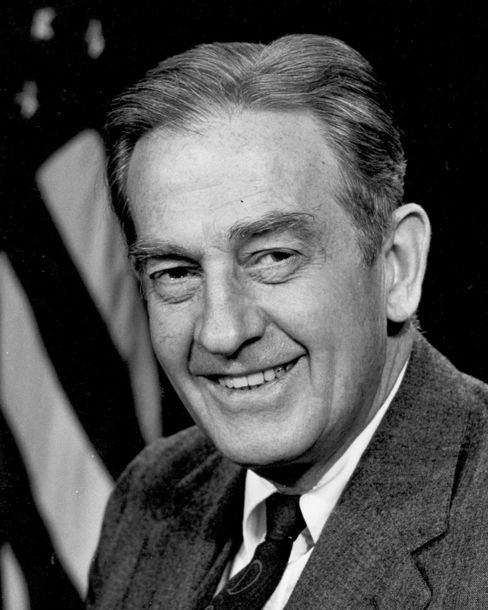

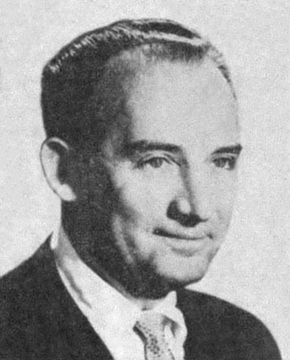
Nominee	Clifford P. Case	Paul J. Krebs
Party	Republican	Democratic
Popular vote	1,743,854	963,573
Percentage	62.46%	34.51%
- County results Case: 50–60% 60–70% 70–80%
U.S. senator before election
Clifford P. Case
Republican
Elected U.S. Senator
Clifford P. Case
Republican

The 1972 United States Senate election in New Jersey was held on November 7, 1972. Incumbent Republican Clifford P. Case defeated Democratic nominee Paul J. Krebs with 62.46% of the vote.

Primary elections were held on June 6. Case turned away a challenge from conservative doctor James Ralph. Krebs won a large plurality in the Democratic primary over Daniel Gaby and Joseph Karcher.

As of 2026, this was the last time the Republicans won a U.S. Senate election in New Jersey, (Note: Nicholas F. Brady was appointed in the Class 1 seat in 1982, following the resignation of Harrison A. Williams, while Jeffrey Chiesa was appointed in this same Class 2 seat in 2013, following the death of Frank Lautenberg.) the second longest such drought for Republicans in any state after Hawaii (since 1970).

Case outperformed Richard Nixon's vote share in the concurrent presidential election by 0.89%.

== Republican primary ==
=== Candidates ===
- Clifford P. Case, incumbent U.S. senator
- James W. Ralph, Bergen County physician and candidate for state senate in 1971

=== Results ===
Republican primary results
Party	Candidate	Votes	%
Republican	Clifford P. Case (incumbent)	187,268	70.13%
Republican	James W. Ralph	79,766	29.87%
Total votes		267,034	100.00%

== Democratic primary ==
=== Candidates ===
- Daniel M. Gaby, Somerset County advertising executive and chair of the Democratic Policy Council
- Joseph T. Karcher, Sayreville borough attorney and former state assemblyman
- Henry Kielbasa, Linden railroad worker
- Paul J. Krebs, former U.S. representative from Livingston

==== Withdrawn ====
- Patrick McGahn, chair of the Atlantic County Democratic Committee

==== Declined ====
- Edward Crabiel, minority leader of the New Jersey Senate

=== Campaign ===
Krebs ran with the support of organized labor and the Hubert Humphrey presidential campaign, as well as the party establishment in Essex, Hudson and Passaic counties, while Gaby ran as a reform candidate and aligned himself with George McGovern's campaign.

=== Results ===
Although McGovern won the state's presidential delegate primary easily over Hubert Humphrey, Krebs defeated Gaby by roughly 50,000 votes.

Democratic primary results
Party	Candidate	Votes	%
Democratic	Paul J. Krebs	135,000	43.16%
Democratic	Daniel M. Gaby	86,213	27.56%
Democratic	Joseph T. Karcher	51,321	16.41%
Democratic	Henry Kielbasa	40,235	12.86%
Total votes		312,769	100.00%

== General election ==
=== Candidates ===
- Clifford Case, incumbent senator since 1955 (Republican)
- A. Howard Freund, Roselle Park resident (American)
- Paul J. Krebs, former U.S. representative from Livingston (Democratic)
- Jules Levin, candidate for U.S. Senate in 1966 (Socialist Labor)
- Charles W. Wiley (Independent)

=== Campaign ===
From the start of the post-primary campaign, Krebs faced "virtually insurmountable political odds."

=== Results ===
1972 United States Senate election in New Jersey
Party	Candidate	Votes	%	±%
Republican	Clifford P. Case (incumbent)	1,743,854	62.46%	▲2.44
Democratic	Paul J. Krebs	963,573	34.51%	▼2.47
American	A. Howard Freund	40,980	1.47%	N/A
Independent	Charles W. Wiley	33,442	1.20%	N/A
Socialist Labor	Jules Levin	10,058	0.36%	▼0.12
Majority		780,281		
Turnout		2,791,907		
Republican hold		Swing		

==== By county ====
County	Case %	Case votes	Krebs %	Krebs votes	Other %	Other votes
Atlantic	65.6%	46,780	32.6%	23,219	1.8%	1,280
Bergen	64.4%	265,008	32.5%	133,449	3.1%	12,773
Burlington	68.6%	73,019	29.8%	31,674	1.6%	1,672
Camden	62.8%	112,303	35.4%	63,369	1.7%	3,096
Cape May	74.4%	21,564	23.4%	6,790	2.2%	644
Cumberland	66.1%	28,182	33.1%	14,133	0.9%	347
Essex	52.5%	163,583	44.2%	137,821	3.3%	10,359
Gloucester	66.1%	45,000	32.9%	22,403	1.0%	668
Hudson	54.7%	116,766	43.1%	92,076	2.2%	4,749
Hunterdon	68.9%	19,973	27.4%	7,934	3.7%	1,087
Mercer	62.6%	74,504	35.0%	41,697	2.4%	2,906
Middlesex	60.3%	138,524	35.6%	81,827	4.1%	9,390
Monmouth	66.0%	116,251	31.4%	55,233	2.6%	4,615
Morris	67.2%	104,216	28.8%	44,704	3.9%	6,128
Ocean	69.1%	69,621	27.4%	27,643	3.4%	3,483
Passaic	61.3%	97,304	35.1%	55,741	3.6%	5,768
Salem	65.3%	15,780	33.8%	8,164	1.0%	217
Somerset	65.1%	52,475	29.0%	23,384	5.9%	4,708
Sussex	70.1%	23,648	26.8%	9,029	3.1%	1,044
Union	62.8%	140,625	33.1%	74,010	4.1%	9,242
Warren	66.2%	18,728	32.8%	9,273	1.1%	304

Counties that flipped from Democratic to Republican

- Hudson
