= Thorn Lord =

American lawyer and politician (1906–1965)

Balfour Bowen Thorn Lord

U.S. Attorney for the District of New Jersey
- In office 1943–1945
- President: Franklin D. Roosevelt
- Preceded by: Charles M. Phillips
- Succeeded by: Edgar H. Rossbach

Personal details
- Born: August 24, 1906 Plainfield, New Jersey, U.S.
- Died: June 16, 1965 (aged 58)
- Party: Democratic
- Spouse(s): Margret Twinning Eastburn (married 1934; divorced ? ) Nina Walton Underwood Lord (married 1943; divorced 1965 )
- Children: 2
- Education: The University of the South
- Profession: Lawyer; Politician

Balfour Bowen Thorn Lord (August 24, 1906 – June 16, 1965) was an American lawyer and Democratic politician from New Jersey.

== Biography ==
Lord was born on August 24, 1906, in Plainfield, New Jersey, to Carroll P. Lord, a New England cotton merchant, and Frances E. Troy of Asheville, North Carolina. The family moved South two years later. He graduated from The University of the South in Sewanee, Tennessee, and received a law degree from the University of North Carolina in 1931.

In 1932, he set up a law practice in Trenton, New Jersey. He served as Assistant United States Attorney and then as U.S. Attorney for the District of New Jersey from 1943 to 1945.

Lord became active in Mercer County politics, first elected to the Lawrence Township committee in 1947. The following year, he took control of the Mercer County Democratic organization and became a powerful force in state Democratic politics. He was credited with masterminding the election of Robert B. Meyner as Governor of New Jersey in 1953, after a decade of Republican rule. Meyner appointed Lord to the board of the Port Authority.

In 1960, Lord was the Democratic nominee for United States Senate to face incumbent Clifford P. Case, but he was defeated by a large margin, despite the fact that John F. Kennedy narrowly won New Jersey in that year's presidential election. After the defeat Lord was elected chairman of the New Jersey Democratic State Committee. He continued to play the role of Democratic kingmaker, helping his former law partner Richard J. Hughes win the gubernatorial election of 1961.

Lord and his first wife Margaret Eastburn had one child, Thorn Jr. After a divorce, he married Nina Underwood, ex-wife of David Hunter McAlpin, Jr. They had a daughter, also named Nina. By 1965, the Lords were separated. Apparently depressed by the estrangement, Lord killed himself by garroting with an electric shaver cord at the home of a friend in Princeton.

Party political offices
Preceded by Charles R. Howell	Democratic Nominee for the U.S. Senate (Class 2) from New Jersey; 1960	Succeeded by Warren W. Wilentz
Preceded by George E. Brunner	Chairman of the New Jersey Democratic State Committee; 1961–1965	Succeeded by Robert J. Burkhardt
