= Robert J. Burkhardt =

American politician (1916–1999)

Robert James Burkhardt (June 10, 1916 – December 30, 1999) was an American Democratic Party politician who served as Secretary of State of New Jersey and chairman of the New Jersey Democratic State Committee.

== Biography ==
Burkardt was born in 1916 and was raised in Chicago. He attended Purdue University and worked as an engineer before becoming involved in New York Democratic politics. In 1949 he headed the New York State Young Democrats and went on to work for Democratic campaigns on the state and national levels, beginning with Adlai Stevenson's 1952 presidential campaign.

In New Jersey, Burkhardt rose in influence first as executive secretary to Governor Robert B. Meyner from 1954 to 1962 and then as Secretary of State under Governor Richard J. Hughes from 1962 to 1970. He also served as gubernatorial campaign director for both Meyner and Hughes. After the death of Thorn Lord in 1965 he was selected as chairman of the New Jersey Democratic State Committee where he played a significant role in planning the 1967 Glassboro Summit Conference between President Lyndon B. Johnson and Soviet Union Premier Alexei Kosygin.

Burkhardt also served as co-director of Citizens for Kennedy in 1960 along with Rep. Frank Thompson of New Jersey. Burkhardt then became Executive Director of Kennedy's inauguration and was appointed Assistant Postmaster General for Facilities, where he served for six months before returning to New Jersey to manage the gubernatorial campaign of Richard Hughes.

His political career came to an end in 1972 when he pleaded guilty in Federal Court to a charge of accepting $30,000 in bribes to 'fix' a bridge construction contract in 1964, when he was serving as Secretary of State to Governor Hughes. He was given a suspended sentence and three years' probation.

Burkhardt resided in Trenton, New Jersey and Central Valley, New York and died in 1999 at Arden Hill Hospital in Goshen, New York at the age of 83 after complications from Parkinson's disease.

Political offices
Preceded by Edward J. Patten	Secretary of State of New Jersey; 1962 – 1970	Succeeded by Paul J. Sherwin
Party political offices
Preceded by Thorn Lord	Chairman of the New Jersey Democratic State Committee; 1965 – 1969	Succeeded by Salvatore A. Bontempo
