= Florence P. Dwyer =

American politician (1902–1976)

Florence Dwyer
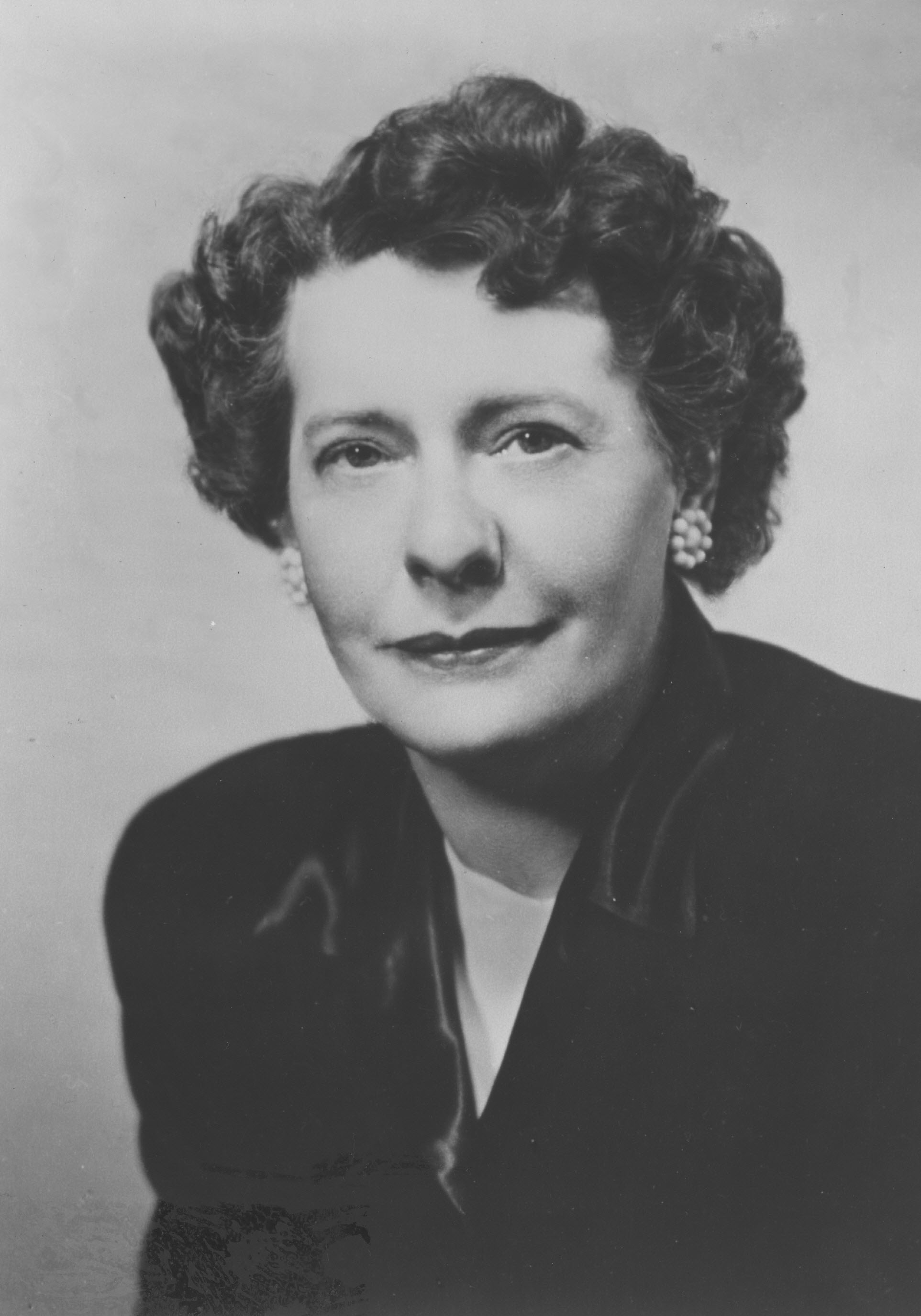

Member of the U.S. House of Representatives from New Jersey
- In office January 3, 1957 – January 3, 1973
- Preceded by: Harrison Williams
- Succeeded by: Matt Rinaldo
- Constituency: 6th district (1957–1967); 12th district (1967–1973)

Personal details
- Born: Florence Louise Price; July 4, 1902 Reading, Pennsylvania, U.S.
- Died: February 29, 1976 (aged 73) Elizabeth, New Jersey, U.S.
- Party: Republican
- Education: University of Toledo (B.A.); Rutgers University, Newark (J.D.)

Florence Price Dwyer (July 4, 1902 – February 29, 1976) was an American Republican Party politician who represented much of Union County, New Jersey in the United States House of Representatives from 1957 to 1973. From 1967 to 1973, she also represented parts of Essex County, New Jersey.

She was the second woman to be elected to the United States House of Representatives from New Jersey. She was the first woman Republican from New Jersey elected to the House. Dwyer was an advocate for women's rights throughout her political career.

== Early life and education ==
Dwyer was born Florence Louise Price in Reading, Pennsylvania. She went to public school in Reading and Toledo, Ohio after moving there. Dwyer later moved to Elizabeth, New Jersey. She took courses at Rutgers Law School and became State Legislation Chairman of the New Jersey Federation of Business and Professional Women.

== Political career ==
Dwyer served as an alternate delegate to the Republican National Convention in 1944 and 1948. She was then elected to the New Jersey General Assembly, where she served from 1950 to 1956. Assemblywoman Dwyer introduced the Equal Pay for Equal Work bill, which was passed in 1952. The bill criminalized "discrimination in the rate of wages on the basis of sex" and later became a model for federal legislation.

In 1956, Dwyer was elected to the United States House of Representatives for the first of eight terms. In 1962, she co-sponsored the Equal Pay Act, which was passed the following year. In 1970, she helped Representative Martha W. Griffiths to bring the Equal Rights Amendment to the floor of the House after it had stalled in committee decades earlier. The amendment, originally drafted by Alice Paul in 1923, passed in the House and Senate, but its deadline for ratification passed without approval by the required number of state legislatures. The ERA has since been reintroduced dozens of times without success.

Dwyer described herself as a "progressive and moderate Republican", who supported civil rights legislation, women's rights, Social Security benefit increases, housing renewal, mass transportation, food stamps, medical care for the aged and anti-poverty programs, making her one of the most liberal Republicans in the House of Representatives. Whenever she voted with the Democrats, Dwyer wore pink clothes, and white or black when voting with Republicans. Dwyer voted in favor of the Civil Rights Acts of 1957, 1960, 1964, and 1968, as well as the 24th Amendment to the U.S. Constitution and the Voting Rights Act of 1965. She was also a supporter of Medicare and Medicaid, the Equal Rights Amendment and was one of 20 House Republicans to support the repeal of the right-to-work law in the Taft-Hartley Act. Dwyer supported the ERA as far back as her first term in Congress in 1957. Dwyer supported Pennsylvania Governor William Scranton in the 1964 Republican presidential primaries. Dwyer was one of thirty-one Republicans in the House to vote in favor of the Comprehensive Child Development Act of 1971.

Dwyer was not a candidate for reelection in 1972. She retired to Elizabeth where she died in 1976. Her body is interred at St. Gertrude's Cemetery, Colonia, New Jersey.

== See also ==
- Women in the United States House of Representatives

U.S. House of Representatives
Preceded by Harrison Williams	Member of the U.S. House of Representatives from New Jersey's 6th congressional district 1957–1967	Succeeded by William Cahill
Preceded by Paul Krebs	Member of the U.S. House of Representatives from New Jersey's 12th congressional district 1967–1973	Succeeded by Matt Rinaldo
