= 1960 United States Senate election in New Jersey =

- November 8, 1960
- Turnout: 91% (▼20pp)
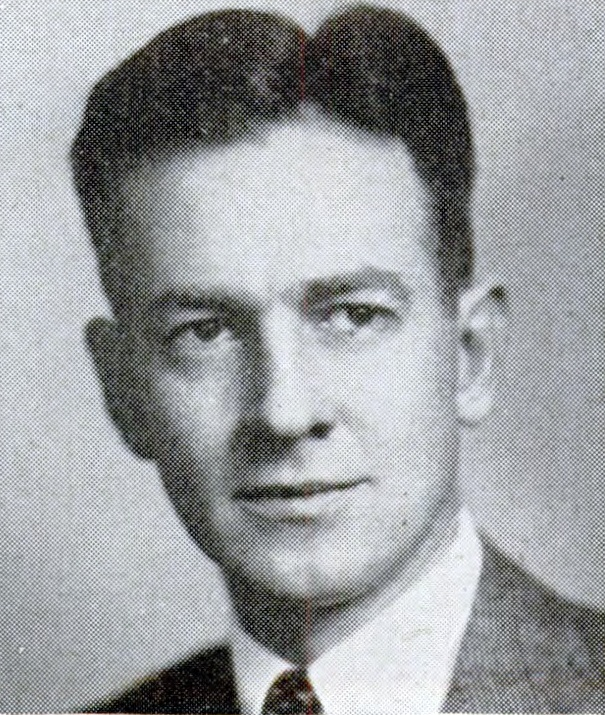

Nominee	Clifford P. Case	Thorn Lord
Party	Republican	Democratic
Popular vote	1,483,832	1,151,385
Percentage	55.69%	43.21%
- County results Case: 50–60% 60–70% 70–80% Lord: 50–60%
U.S. senator before election
Clifford P. Case
Republican
Elected U.S. Senator
Clifford P. Case
Republican

The 1960 United States Senate election in New Jersey was held on November 8, 1960. Incumbent Republican Clifford P. Case defeated Democratic nominee Thorn Lord with 55.69% of the vote. This election was the first time since 1924 where an incumbent Republican Senator was re-elected to this seat.

== Primary elections ==
Primary elections were held on April 19, 1960.

=== Democratic primary ===
==== Candidates ====
- Thorn Lord, chair of the Mercer County Democratic Party and former United States Attorney for the District of New Jersey
- Richard M. Glassner, Newark attorney

==== Results ====
Democratic primary results
Party	Candidate	Votes	%
Democratic	Thorn Lord	177,429	81.55
Democratic	Richard M. Glassner	40,134	18.45
Total votes		217,563	100.00

=== Republican primary ===
==== Candidates ====
- Clifford P. Case, incumbent United States Senator
- David Dearborn, Union County businessman
- Robert J. Morris, anti-communist activist

==== Results ====
Republican primary results
Party	Candidate	Votes	%
Republican	Clifford P. Case (incumbent)	230,802	63.72
Republican	Robert J. Morris	120,729	33.33
Republican	David Dearborn	10,687	2.95
Total votes		362,218	100.00

== General election ==
=== Candidates ===
- Clifford P. Case, incumbent U.S. Senator (Republican)
- Gladys Grauer (Socialist Workers)
- Thorn Lord, chair of the Mercer County Democratic Party and former United States Attorney for the District of New Jersey (Democratic)
- Winifred O. Perry, insurance broker and former Verona councilman (Conservative)
- Albert Ronis (Socialist Labor)

=== Results ===
1960 United States Senate election in New Jersey
Party	Candidate	Votes	%	±%
Republican	Clifford P. Case (incumbent)	1,483,832	55.69%	▲7.03
Democratic	Thorn Lord	1,151,385	43.21%	▼5.26
Conservative	Winifred O. Perry	13,756	0.52%	
Socialist Workers	Gladys Grauer	11,784	0.44%	
Socialist Labor	Albert Ronis	3,599	0.14%	
Majority		332,447		
Turnout		2,664,356	12.48%	
Republican hold		Swing		

==== By county ====
County	Case %	Case votes	Lord %	Lord votes	Other %	Other votes
Atlantic	58.2%	41,746	39.7%	28,486	2.2%	1,520
Bergen	63.8%	233,814	35.6%	130,328	0.6%	2,361
Burlington	58.2%	45,895	41.7%	32,896	0.2%	127
Camden	52.6%	92,366	47.1%	82,756	0.4%	600
Cape May	65.2%	16,200	34.7%	8,631	0.01%	9
Cumberland	56.9%	24,521	43.0%	18,556	0.1%	48
Essex	50.7%	190,888	47.1%	177,163	2.3%	8,436
Gloucester	58.0%	35,288	41.9%	25,455	0.01%	54
Hudson	42.9%	121,775	56.0%	159,021	1.0%	2,975
Hunterdon	66.1%	15,732	33.5%	7,957	0.3%	98
Mercer	46.9%	54,715	52.8%	61,579	0.4%	355
Middlesex	48.8%	95,157	50.8%	99,204	0.4%	749
Monmouth	63.4%	86,497	36.1%	49,301	0.5%	639
Morris	70.4%	79,699	29.2%	33,070	0.4%	490
Ocean	64.7%	31,335	34.5%	16,736	0.8%	390
Passaic	50.7%	87,850	45.0%	77,996	4.3%	7,477
Salem	54.7%	14,133	45.2%	11,673	0.2%	40
Somerset	62.2%	37,869	37.1%	22,628	0.7%	420
Sussex	71.4%	16,403	28.5%	6,553	0.1%	21
Union	61.3%	145,445	37.7%	89,398	1.1%	2,509
Warren	57.9%	16,504	42.1%	11,998	0.1%	21

Counties that flipped from Democratic to Republican

- Burlington
- Camden
- Essex
- Passaic
- Warren
