= Harry Dudkin =

American judge

Harry Dudkin (June 25, 1908 – March 5, 1987) was an American Democratic Party politician and judge who served as Clerk of the New Jersey General Assembly.

== Early life ==
Dudkin was born in Newark, New Jersey on June 25, 1908. He graduated in 1929 from New Jersey Law School (now Rutgers School of Law–Newark). He was a member of the McClellan Law Club, a debating society, and won the Chester Sherman Prize for legal research. He was admitted to the New Jersey State Bar Association in 1931. He was also a 1951 graduate of the New Jersey Institute of Fire, Casualty and Life Underwriters.

== Background ==
From 1941 to 1949, Dudkin served as an Acting Judge of the Criminal Courts for the City of Newark. From 1949 to 1956, he served as the Secretary of the Newark Insurance Fund Commission. He later served as an Assistant Essex County Prosecutor.

In 1948, Dudkin was the Democratic nominee for the U.S. House of Representatives in New Jersey's 12th district against five-term Republican Congressman Robert Kean. Kean defeated Dudkin by 4,737 votes, 63,232 (50.8%) to 58, 495 (47.0%). President Harry Truman, campaigning in Newark on October 6, endorsed Dudkin, saying: "That means that here in Newark you're going to send Peter Rodino to the Congress, and Hugh Addonizio and Harry Dudkin to the House of Representatives. Every one of these men deserves your support. They will fight your battle in Washington, and how that fight needs to be made nobody knows better than I do. They will fight your battle there, and men like them all over the Nation will be fighting that battle--and will win that battle if you're behind us--the battle for the people, a fight which started with Jefferson, continued with Jackson, was won by Franklin Roosevelt in 1934."

Dudkin ran again in 1950, and lost by 8,598 votes, 54,123(53.1% to 45,525 (44.7%).

Dudkin was married to Hanna Levitin (1910–1993) of Norfolk, Virginia. They had one daughter, Gail Elizabeth, who married Ronald Merson.

== Death ==
On March 5, 1987, Dudkin was murdered while working at his family stationery store in East Orange, New Jersey. "At first, detectives theorized that he had fallen and hit his head, but an autopsy the next day uncovered a .38-caliber slug in his head," the (Newark) Star-Ledger wrote in a story about cold cases. "By the time detectives canvassed the neighborhood, the crime was two days old." Only then did investigators realize that the store's daily receipts were missing." Dudkin was 79. His murder remains unsolved.

== See also ==
- Crime in New Jersey
- List of unsolved murders (1980–1999)
