= Thomas J. Holleran =

American judge (1906–1984)

Thomas J. Holleran (1906–1984) was an American Democratic Party politician and jurist from New Jersey who once banned Nazi sympathizers from holding rallies during the 1930s. He served as a Municipal Court Judge in Irvington, New Jersey for eighteen years. He was a graduate of Seton Hall University and Rutgers University Law School. He was the Democratic nominee for Congress in 1940 against freshman U.S. Rep. Robert Kean, losing 67,996 (53.68%) to 53,677 (42.38%). When Kean ran for the U.S. Senate in 1959, Holleran again ran for Congress. He lost to Republican George M. Wallhauser by 8,048 votes, 57,510 (52.68%) to 49,463 (45.30%).

In 1934, Judge Holleran received national attention when he banned Nazi sympathizers from holding public meetings in Irvington. Holleran's ruling came after a May riot occurred between a group of 40-50 Nazi supporters came to Irvington by bus to participate in a pro-Hitler rally. More than 60 people were hospitalized as a result of the rally. Irvington had been called a "hotbed of Nazi activity."

Holleran was the choice of Essex County Democratic Chairman Dennis Carey to become the Essex County Prosecutor in 1958, but Governor Robert Meyner declined to nominate him.
