= Warren W. Wilentz =

American lawyer

Warren W. Wilentz (March 29, 1924 – March 18, 2010) was an American lawyer and Democratic politician from New Jersey. He was the son of New Jersey Attorney General David T. Wilentz, who prosecuted Bruno Hauptmann in the Lindbergh kidnapping trial, and the brother of New Jersey Supreme Court Chief Justice Robert Wilentz.

Wilentz was born in 1924 in Perth Amboy, New Jersey, to David and Lena (Goldman) Wilentz and graduated from Perth Amboy High School. He attended University of Virginia and New York University, and he received an LL.B from Rutgers University in 1949. He served as Prosecuting Attorney for Middlesex County from 1956 to 1960 and County Attorney from 1960 to 1967. He also became a partner of the Woodbridge firm founded by his father, Wilentz, Goldman & Spitzer.

In 1966, Wilentz was the Democratic nominee for the United States Senate to oppose Republican incumbent Clifford P. Case. He was recruited after several other potential candidates, including former New Jersey Governor Robert Meyner, declined to run. Wilentz was soundly defeated by a margin of 60%-37%.

In 1975, Wilentz pleaded guilty to failing to file tax returns for four consecutive years on income totaling over $885,000. During the same year, he appeared as defense counsel for George Katz, a Fort Lee garbage contractor who was indicated with New Jersey secretary of state J. Edward Crabiel on bid-rigging charges.

Wilentz was paralyzed in an automobile collision in December 2002. He received treatment at the Kessler Institute for Rehabilitation in West Orange, New Jersey.

He died on March 18, 2010, at the age of 85.

Party political offices
Preceded by Thorn Lord	Democratic Nominee for the U.S. Senate (Class 2) from New Jersey; 1966	Succeeded by Paul J. Krebs
