= Joseph Siegler =

American politician and jurist (1889-1957)

Member of the New Jersey General Assembly for Essex County
- In office 1919–1920

Judge of the Essex County Juvenile and Domestic Relations Court
- In office 1927–1938

Personal details
- Born: September 6, 1889 Newark, New Jersey, U.S.
- Died: May 17, 1957 (aged 67) Newark, New Jersey
- Party: Democratic
- Education: New York University School of Law
- Occupation: Lawyer

Joseph Siegler (September 6, 1889 – May 17, 1957) was an American Democratic politician and jurist from Newark, New Jersey who served in the New Jersey General Assembly.

== Biography ==
Siegler was born in Newark, New Jersey on September 6, 1889. He was the son of Louis and Bertha Siegler. From age nine until entering law school, Siegler worked as a paperboy. He was a 1909 graduate of New York University Law School, and was admitted to the bar in 1910. He was married on March 25, 1913 to Edith R. Unterman. His brother-in-law was William Untermann, a Newark Police Court Judge and a Newark Democratic leader.

He was elected to the New Jersey General Assembly in 1918, and was re-elected in 1919.

In 1927, Governor A. Harry Moore appointed Siegler to serve as a Judge of the Essex County Juvenile and Domestic Relations Court. A 1937 ruling that parents could not provide home instruction for children equivalent to their training in school as members of a social group received national attention. "It is almost impossible for a child to be adequately taught in his home," he ruled. Siegler argued that juvenile delinquency was mostly a result of domestic unhappiness. He advocated that jurisdiction of the juvenile court be extended from 16 to 21; it was later extended to 19. He retired from the bench in 1938.

Siegler ran for the U.S. House of Representatives in 1942, challenging two-term Republican Robert Kean. He was defeated by 17,754 votes, 43,942 (60.82%) to 26,188 (36.25%).

He died of a heart ailment in 1957 at age 67.
