= George M. Wallhauser Jr. =

American politician

George Marvin Wallhauser Jr.

Chairman of the New Jersey Highway Authority
- Appointed by: William Thomas Cahill
- Preceded by: John P. Gallagher

Personal details
- Born: April 4, 1927 Newark, New Jersey
- Died: August 7, 2011 (aged 84) Rossmoor, New Jersey
- Education: Columbia High School; Wharton School of the University of Pennsylvania

George Marvin Wallhauser Jr. (April 4, 1927 – August 7, 2011) was an American Republican Party politician who served as the Chairman of the Essex County Republican Organization and was a candidate for the United States House of Representatives in 1968. He served on the New Jersey Public Utilities Commission and was an insurance consultant for the North Jersey Water Supply Commission. He served as chairman of East Orange General Hospital. He served as Chairman of the New Jersey Highway Authority.

== Biography ==
He was born on April 4, 1927, in Newark, New Jersey, to George M. Wallhauser, who represented New Jersey in the U.S. House of Representatives from 1959 to 1965. His family then moved to East Orange, New Jersey, until he was three, then his family moved to Maplewood, New Jersey, where he attended Columbia High School. He attended the Wharton School of the University of Pennsylvania where he was a member of the Delta Tau Delta fraternity. During World War II he served in the United States Army Air Corps on the Aleutian Islands.

In positions with Aetna early in his career, he was appointed editor of the monthly Life Aetna-izer in 1955, and after Hawaii became a state, in 1960, he opened an agency there. He was Chairman of the East Orange General Hospital for seventeen years.

In 1968, Wallhauser sought the Republican nomination for United States House of Representatives in New Jersey's 11th congressional district against three-term Democratic incumbent Joseph Minish. He won the Republican primary over Donald MacArt of East Orange and Jack Hastings Burmeister of Maplewood, (66%-33%-1%). He lost the general election to Minish, 91,496 (66%) to 46,426 (33%). In that campaign, Wallhauser proposed federal subsidies to urban areas to pay police officers and firefighters.

He was the Essex County Republican Chairman from 1971 to 1973. He did not seek re-election after William T. Cahill lost the Republican gubernatorial nomination to conservative Charles Sandman.

Wallhauser served as a Commissioner of the New Jersey Board of Public Utilities under Governor Cahill.

In 1972 he was appointed as the chairman of the New Jersey Highway Authority by Governor Cahill. He replaced John P. Gallagher, Gallagher, resigned to become the Garden State Parkway's executive director. In 1975 Wallhauser voted against lifting the ban on motorcycles on the Garden State Parkway.

He served as the Chairman of People for Bateman during the 1977 gubernatorial campaign of Raymond Bateman.

He died on August 7, 2011, in Rossmoor, New Jersey.
