= 1966 United States Senate election in New Jersey =

- November 8, 1966
- Turnout: 71% (▼20pp)
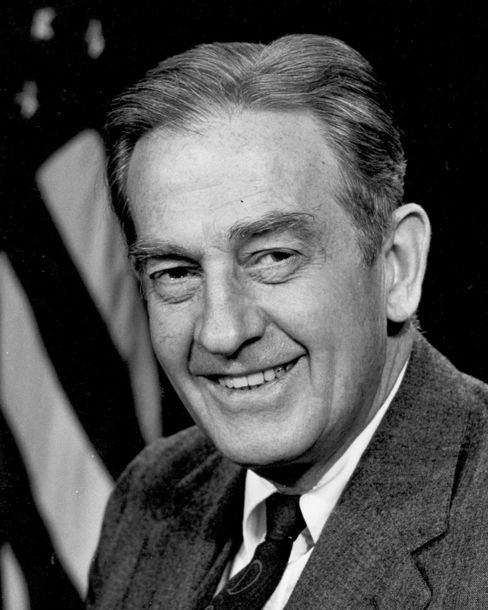

Nominee	Clifford P. Case	Warren W. Wilentz
Party	Republican	Democratic
Popular vote	1,278,843	788,021
Percentage	60.02%	36.98%
- County results Case: 50–60% 60–70% Wilentz: 50–60%
U.S. senator before election
Clifford P. Case
Republican
Elected U.S. Senator
Clifford P. Case
Republican

The 1966 United States Senate election in New Jersey was held on November 8, 1966. Incumbent Republican Clifford P. Case defeated Democratic nominee Warren W. Wilentz with 60.02% of the vote.

Primary elections were held on September 13, 1966. Case was unopposed, while Wilentz easily won his primary over Dr. David Frost, who opposed the Vietnam War, and John J. Winberry, who ran on opposition to the state sales tax.

== Republican primary ==
=== Candidates ===
- Clifford P. Case, incumbent United States Senator

=== Results ===
Republican primary results
Party	Candidate	Votes	%
Republican	Clifford P. Case (incumbent)	202,484	100.00
Total votes		202,484	100.00

== Democratic primary ==
=== Candidates ===
- Jerry Charles Burmeister, patent development executive
- Clarence Coggins, Jersey City resident
- David Frost, research biologist and peace activist
- Warren W. Wilentz, former Middlesex County Attorney
- John J. Winberry, former Deputy Attorney General of New Jersey

=== Results ===
Democratic primary results
Party	Candidate	Votes	%
Democratic	Warren W. Wilentz	197,428	72.73%
Democratic	David Frost	31,289	11.53%
Democratic	John J. Winberry	19,745	7.27%
Democratic	Clarence Coggins	16,775	6.18%
Democratic	Jerry Charles Burmeister	6,205	2.29%
Total votes		271,442	100.00

== General election ==
=== Candidates ===
- Clifford P. Case, incumbent Senator since 1955 (Republican)
- Jules Levin (Socialist Labor)
- Robert Lee Schlachter (Independent)
- Warren W. Wilentz, former Middlesex County Attorney (Democratic)

=== Results ===
1966 United States Senate election in New Jersey
Party	Candidate	Votes	%	±%
Republican	Clifford P. Case (incumbent)	1,278,843	60.02%	▲4.33
Democratic	Warren W. Wilentz	788,021	36.98%	▼6.23
Independent	Robert Lee Schlachter	53,605	2.52%	
Socialist Labor	Jules Levin	10,218	0.48%	
Majority		490,822		
Turnout		2,130,687		
Republican hold		Swing		

==== By county ====
County	Case %	Case votes	Wilentz %	Wilentz votes	Other %	Other votes
Atlantic	61.5%	37,458	34.6%	21,040	3.9%	2,391
Bergen	63.7%	194,978	33.5%	102,390	2.8%	8,551
Burlington	63.5%	41,850	34.0%	22,407	2.5%	1,676
Camden	58.7%	78,068	38.7%	51,491	2.6%	3,420
Cape May	66.7%	14,688	30.6%	6,732	2.6%	588
Cumberland	60.5%	20,907	38.4%	13,250	1.2%	387
Essex	59.1%	152,761	37.5%	96,970	3.4%	8,744
Gloucester	62.6%	32,284	35.1%	17,823	1.2%	628
Hudson	40.4%	83,196	56.0%	115,239	3.6%	7,398
Hunterdon	66.1%	13,164	31.3%	6,241	2.6%	515
Mercer	59.3%	51,402	38.9%	33,696	1.8%	1,615
Middlesex	58.8%	100,204	39.2%	66,894	2.0%	3,339
Monmouth	64.7%	80,622	32.9%	66,894	2.4%	2,985
Morris	69.0%	68,107	27.1%	26,725	2.9%	3,913
Ocean	66.6%	35,116	31.3%	16,503	2.1%	1,122
Passaic	56.8%	77,005	39.3%	53,378	3.9%	5,270
Salem	56.4%	11,702	42.7%	8,870	0.9%	189
Somerset	67.6%	39,062	27.7%	15,986	4.7%	2,739
Sussex	64.7%	13,424	33.1%	6,872	2.1%	445
Union	65.7%	121,403	30.1%	55,639	4.2%	7,624
Warren	56.7%	11,942	42.0%	8,848	1.4%	285

Counties that flipped from Democratic to Republican

- Mercer
- Middlesex
