= Martin S. Fox =

American publisher (1924–2020)

Martin Stanford Fox (June 7, 1924 – April 8, 2020) was an American publisher who served as President of the Jewish Telegraphic Agency, the oldest and largest international news agency and wire service serving Jewish community newspapers and media around the world.

== Early life and education ==
Fox was born in Newark, New Jersey, in June 1924, the oldest son of Mae Fox and of Jacob Fox (1898–1992), who was the longtime attorney for the Newark Board of Education. He attended Weequahic High School, was a graduate of Amherst College and received his law degree from Harvard Law School in 1949. He served as a lieutenant in the U.S. Army during World War II. He served as vice chairman of the Essex County, New Jersey Chapter of Americans for Democratic Action. He was a partner at the Newark firm of Fox and Fox, with his father and brother.

== Career ==
=== Politics ===
In 1952, at age 28, Fox won the Democratic nomination for the U.S. House of Representatives in New Jersey's 12th congressional district. President Harry Truman's low approval ratings and the election of Dwight Eisenhower as the first Republican president in twenty years, helped Republicans win control of the House. Given the national political climate, Fox surprised local Democrats with a stronger than expected showing. He lost by 14,903 votes to the seven-term incumbent, Republican Robert Kean, 84,949 (54.81%) to 70,046 (45.19%).

Democrats viewed their chances as better in 1954, Eisenhower's mid-term election. Republicans were facing a fallout from the McCarthy hearings. Fox was again nominated as Kean's Democratic opponent. He ran as an unabashed liberal, calling himself "essentially New Dealish." He attacked Kean for voting against "socially important measures," and called for the repeal of the Taft-Hartley Act. While Democrats regained control of the House, picking up 18 seats, Kean beat Fox in a close race, 59,151 (53.07%) to 52,314 (46.93%), a margin of just 6,837 votes.

Governor Robert B. Meyner appointed him to serve as a member of the New Jersey State Board of Education in 1960. He was reappointed by Governor Richard J. Hughes and served until his replacement by Governor William Cahill in 1970.

=== Writing career ===
In 1979, he was elected President of the Jewish Telegraphic Agency. Fox was President of the Jewish Community Federation of Metropolitan New Jersey, and after his term as president continued to be active with its charities into his nineties. He served as a United Jewish Appeal campaign chairman, and on the Board of the Council of Jewish Federations. He also served as a board member on HIAS.

== Personal life and death ==
Fox's wife is Muriel Kaplan Fox. They have two daughters. Fox was an avid fisherman and won first place in the Martha's Vineyard Fishing Derby for shore Albacore in 1991 and came in second place twice for shore Bonito.

Fox died from COVID-19 complications in Millburn, New Jersey, on April 8, 2020, during the COVID-19 pandemic in New Jersey. He was 95 years old.
