= Edgar H. Rossbach =

American lawyer

U.S. Attorney for the District of New Jersey
- In office 1945–1948
- President: Harry Truman
- Preceded by: Thorn Lord
- Succeeded by: Isiah Matlack

Personal details
- Born: August 20, 1903 Newark, New Jersey
- Died: November 11, 1952 (aged 49)
- Education: Colgate University (1925); South Jersey Law School (1932)
- Profession: Lawyer

Edgar Hilary Rossbach (August 20, 1903 — November 11, 1952) was an American lawyer who served as U.S. Attorney for the District of New Jersey from 1945 to 1948.

== Biography ==
Rossbach was born in Newark, New Jersey in 1903, the son of Adam J. and Rhoda Rossbach. He attended Colgate University, graduating in 1925, and South Jersey Law School (now Rutgers School of Law–Camden), graduating in 1932. He was admitted to the New Jersey bar in 1935 and joined his father's law practice. He was made partner in Rossbach & Rossbach in 1936.

In 1942, he was named Assistant U.S. Attorney for the District of New Jersey. He was promoted to U.S. Attorney in September 1945 following the resignation of Thorn Lord. Among the figures prosecuted during Rossbach's tenure were labor leader Joseph S. Fay, charged with income tax evasion, and former New Jersey Attorney General Walter D. Van Riper, charged in a check kiting scheme. Both Fay and Van Riper were subsequently acquitted. He resigned from office in May 1948.

Rossbach resided with his wife Ann in East Orange. He died in 1952 at the age of 49 at Saint Barnabas Hospital in Newark after a major operation.

Legal offices
| Preceded by Thorn Lord | United States Attorney for the District of New Jersey; 1945 – 1948 | Succeeded by Isaiah Matlack |
