= McGovern–Hatfield Amendment =

Proposed amendment to an appropriations bill in 1970

The McGovern–Hatfield Amendment (alternately, Hatfield–McGovern Amendment) was a proposed amendment to an appropriations bill in 1970 during the Vietnam War that, if passed, would have required the end of United States military operations in the Republic of Vietnam by December 31, 1970, and a complete withdrawal of American forces halfway through the next year. It was the most outstanding defiance of executive power regarding the war prior to 1971. The amendment was proposed by Senators George McGovern (D-SD) and Mark Hatfield (R-OR), and was known as the "amendment to end the war."

The amendment was heavily opposed by the administration of President Richard Nixon. A revision of the amendment intended to gain more widespread support extended the deadline for withdrawal to the end of 1971. Nevertheless, the amendment was opposed by Nixon and his backers in the Congress, who argued that a withdrawal deadline would devastate the American position in negotiations with North Vietnam. On September 1, 1970, the amendment failed by a 55–39 margin.

A second version of the amendment was reintroduced in 1971 with only minor revisions. In light of Nixon's interventions in Cambodia and Laos the year prior, public and Congressional enthusiasm for the legislation indicated the 1971 amendment could fare better than the original. McGovern, along with Senate allies, appeared on nationwide broadcasts and at protests to lobby for the amendment's passage. Ultimately, the 1971 revised amendment would be defeated by a margin of 55–42, gaining three additional sponsors.

== McGovern's speech ==
Minutes before the voting began, McGovern appealed for support with the strongest and most emotional language he had ever used regarding the war:

Every senator in this chamber is partly responsible for sending 50,000 young Americans to an early grave. This chamber reeks of blood. Every Senator here is partly responsible for that human wreckage at Walter Reed and Bethesda Naval and all across our land—young men without legs, or arms, or genitals, or faces or hopes.

There are not very many of these blasted and broken boys who think this war is a glorious adventure. Do not talk to them about bugging out, or national honor or courage. It does not take any courage at all for a congressman, or a senator, or a president to wrap himself in the flag and say we are staying in Vietnam, because it is not our blood that is being shed. But we are responsible for those young men and their lives and their hopes. And if we do not end this damnable war those young men will some day curse us for our pitiful willingness to let the Executive carry the burden that the Constitution places on us.

So before we vote, let us ponder the admonition of Edmund Burke, the great parliamentarian of an earlier day: "A conscientious man would be cautious how he dealt in blood."

According to historian Robert Mann, McGovern's brief, passionate speech shocked his Senate colleagues. As McGovern took his seat, most senators sat in stunned silence. "You could have heard a pin drop," recalled John Holum, McGovern's principal staff advisor on Vietnam. As the Senate prepared to begin voting on the amendment, one senator approached McGovern and indignantly told him that he had been personally offended by the speech. McGovern replied, "That's what I meant to do."

== Text of the amendment ==
McGovern–Hatfield Amendment, H.R. 17123

(a) In accordance with public statements of policy by the President, no funds authorized by this or any other act may be obligated or expended to maintain a troop level of more than 280,000 armed forces of the United States in Vietnam after April 30, 1971.

(b) After April 30, 1971, funds herein authorized or hereafter appropriated may be expended in connection with activities of American Armed Forces in and over Indochina only to accomplish the following objectives:

(1) the orderly termination of military operations there and the safe and systematic withdrawal of remaining armed forces by December 31, 1971;

(2) to secure the release of prisoners of war;

(3) the provision of asylum for Vietnamese who might be physically endangered by withdrawal of American forces; and

(4) to provide assistance to the Republic of Vietnam consistent with the foregoing objectives; provided however, that if the President while giving effect to the foregoing paragraphs of this section, finds in meeting the termination date that members of the American armed forces are exposed to unanticipated clear and present danger, he may suspend the application of paragraph 2(a) for a period not to exceed 60 days and shall inform the Congress forthwith of his findings; and within 10 days following application of the suspension the President may submit recommendations, including (if necessary) a new date applicable to subsection b(1) for Congressional approval.

== 1970 Amendment Vote Total ==
Senate vote on the Amendment to End the War
September 1, 1970	Party		Total votes
September 1, 1970	Democratic	Republican	Total votes
Nay	21	34	55
Yea	32	7	39
Result: Failed
Roll call vote: Senator / Party / State / Vote; George Aiken / R / Vermont / Nay; James Allen / D / Alabama / Nay; Gordon Allott / R / Colorado / Nay; Howard Baker / R / Tennessee / Nay; Birch Bayh / D / Indiana / Yea; Henry Bellmon / R / Oklahoma / Nay; Wallace F. Bennett / R / Utah / Nay; Alan Bible / D / Nevada / Nay; J. Caleb Boggs / R / Delaware / Nay; Edward Brooke / R / Massachusetts / Yea; Quentin Burdick / D / North Dakota / Yea; Harry F. Byrd / D / Virginia / Nay; Robert Byrd / D / West Virginia / Nay; Clifford P. Case / R / New Jersey / Yea; Frank Church / D / Idaho / Yea; Marlow Cook / R / Kentucky / Nay; John Sherman Cooper / R / Kentucky / Nay; Norris Cotton / R / New Hampshire / Nay; Alan Cranston / D / California / Yea; Carl Curtis / R / Nebraska / Nay; Thomas J. Dodd / D / Connecticut / Nay; Bob Dole / R / Kansas / Nay; Peter H. Dominick / R / Colorado / Nay; Thomas Eagleton / D / Missouri / Yea; James Eastland / D / Mississippi / Nay; Allen J. Ellender / D / Louisiana / Nay; Sam Ervin / D / North Carolina / Nay; Paul Fannin / R / Arizona / Nay; Hiram Fong / R / Hawaii / Nay; J. William Fulbright / D / Arkansas / Yea; Barry Goldwater / R / Arizona / Nay; Charles Goodell / R / New York / Yea; Albert Gore Sr. / D / Tennessee / Nay; Mike Gravel / D / Alaska / Yea; Robert P. Griffin / R / Michigan / Nay; Edward Gurney / R / Florida / Nay; Clifford Hansen / R / Wyoming / Nay; Fred R. Harris / D / Oklahoma / Yea; Philip Hart / D / Michigan / Yea; Vance Hartke / D / Indiana / Yea; Mark Hatfield / R / Oregon / Yea; Spessard Holland / D / Florida / Nay; Ernest F. Hollings / D / South Carolina / Nay; Roman Hruska / R / Nebraska / Nay; Harold Hughes / D / Iowa / Yea; Daniel Inouye / D / Hawaii / Yea; Henry M. Jackson / D / Washington / Nay; Jacob Javits / R / New York / Yea; B. Everett Jordan / D / North Carolina / Nay; Len Jordan / R / Idaho / Nay; Ted Kennedy / D / Massachusetts / Yea; Warren Magnuson / D / Washington / Yea; Mike Mansfield / D / Montana / Yea; Charles Mathias / R / Maryland / Yea; Eugene McCarthy / D / Minnesota / Yea; John L. McClellan / D / Arkansas / Nay; Gale W. McGee / D / Wyoming / Nay; George McGovern / D / South Dakota / Yea; Thomas J. McIntyre / D / New Hampshire / Yea; Lee Metcalf / D / Montana / Yea; Jack Miller / R / Iowa / Nay; Walter Mondale / D / Minnesota / Yea; Joseph Montoya / D / New Mexico / Yea; George Murphy / R / California / Nay; Edmund Muskie / D / Maine / Yea; Gaylord Nelson / D / Wisconsin / Yea; John Pastore / D / Rhode Island / Yea; James B. Pearson / R / Kansas / Nay; Claiborne Pell / D / Rhode Island / Yea; Charles H. Percy / R / Illinois / Nay; Winston L. Prouty / R / Vermont / Nay; William Proxmire / D / Wisconsin / Yea; Jennings Randolph / D / West Virginia / Nay; Abraham Ribicoff / D / Connecticut / Yea; Richard Russell Jr. / D / Georgia / Nay; William B. Saxbe / R / Ohio / Nay; Hugh Scott / R / Pennsylvania / Nay; Richard Schweiker / R / Pennsylvania / Yea; Ralph T. Smith / R / Illinois / Nay; Margaret Chase Smith / R / Maine / Nay; Ted Stevens / R / Alaska / Nay; John Sparkman / D / Alabama / Nay; William Spong Jr. / D / Virginia / Nay; John C. Stennis / D / Mississippi / Nay; Stuart Symington / D / Missouri / Yea; Herman Talmadge / D / Georgia / Nay; Strom Thurmond / R / South Carolina / Nay; John Tower / R / Texas / Nay; Joseph Tydings / D / Maryland / Yea; John J. Williams / R / Delaware / Nay; Harrison A. Williams / D / New Jersey / Yea; Ralph Yarborough / D / Texas / Yea; Milton Young / R / North Dakota / Nay; Stephen M. Young / D / Ohio / Yea

Six Senators did not vote, but all made clear their feelings regarding the legislation. Democratic Senators Russell Long of Louisiana, Howard Cannon of Nevada, and Clinton Anderson of New Mexico expressed they opposed the amendment, while Frank Moss of Utah said he would have voted in favor.

On the Republican side of the aisle, Robert Packwood of Oregon was recorded as being against the amendment, as well as Karl Mundt of South Dakota.

== 1971 Amendment Vote Total ==
Senate vote on the Amendment to End the War
June 16, 1971	Party		Total votes
June 16, 1971	Democratic	Republican	Total votes
Nay	19	36	55
Yea	34	8	42
Result: Failed
Roll call vote: Senator / Party / State / Vote; George Aiken / R / Vermont / Nay; James Allen / D / Alabama / Nay; Gordon Allott / R / Colorado / Nay; Clinton P. Anderson / D / New Mexico / Yea; Howard Baker / R / Tennessee / Nay; Birch Bayh / D / Indiana / Yea; J. Glenn Beall Jr. / R / Maryland / Nay; Henry Bellmon / R / Oklahoma / Nay; Wallace F. Bennett / R / Utah / Nay; Lloyd Bentsen / D / Texas / Nay; Alan Bible / D / Nevada / Nay; J. Caleb Boggs / R / Delaware / Nay; Bill Brock / R / Tennessee / Nay; Edward Brooke / R / Massachusetts / Yea; James L. Buckley / C / New York / Nay; Quentin Burdick / D / North Dakota / Yea; Harry F. Byrd / D / Virginia / Nay; Robert Byrd / D / West Virginia / Nay; Howard Cannon / D / Nevada / Nay; Clifford P. Case / R / New Jersey / Yea; Lawton Chiles / D / Florida / Yea; Frank Church / D / Idaho / Yea; Marlow Cook / R / Kentucky / Nay; John Sherman Cooper / R / Kentucky / Nay; Norris Cotton / R / New Hampshire / Nay; Alan Cranston / D / California / Yea; Carl Curtis / R / Nebraska / Nay; Bob Dole / R / Kansas / Nay; Peter H. Dominick / R / Colorado / Nay; Thomas Eagleton / D / Missouri / Yea; James Eastland / D / Mississippi / Nay; Allen J. Ellender / D / Louisiana / Nay; Sam Ervin / D / North Carolina / Nay; Paul Fannin / R / Arizona / Nay; Hiram Fong / R / Hawaii / Nay; David H. Gambrell / D / Georgia / Nay; Barry Goldwater / R / Arizona / Nay; Mike Gravel / D / Alaska / Yea; Robert P. Griffin / R / Michigan / Nay; Edward Gurney / R / Florida / Nay; Clifford Hansen / R / Wyoming / Nay; Fred R. Harris / D / Oklahoma / Yea; Philip Hart / D / Michigan / Yea; Vance Hartke / D / Indiana / Yea; Mark Hatfield / R / Oregon / Yea; Ernest F. Hollings / D / South Carolina / Nay; Roman Hruska / R / Nebraska / Nay; Harold Hughes / D / Iowa / Yea; Hubert Humphrey / D / Minnesota / Yea; Daniel Inouye / D / Hawaii / Yea; Henry M. Jackson / D / Washington / Nay; Jacob Javits / R / New York / Yea; B. Everett Jordan / D / North Carolina / Yea; Len Jordan / R / Idaho / Nay; Ted Kennedy / D / Massachusetts / Yea; Russell B. Long / D / Louisiana / Nay; Warren Magnuson / D / Washington / Yea; Mike Mansfield / D / Montana / Yea; Charles Mathias / R / Maryland / Yea; John L. McClellan / D / Arkansas / Nay; Gale W. McGee / D / Wyoming / Nay; George McGovern / D / South Dakota / Yea; Thomas J. McIntyre / D / New Hampshire / Yea; Lee Metcalf / D / Montana / Yea; Jack Miller / R / Iowa / Nay; Walter Mondale / D / Minnesota / Yea; Joseph Montoya / D / New Mexico / Yea; Frank Moss / D / Utah / Yea; Edmund Muskie / D / Maine / Yea; Gaylord Nelson / D / Wisconsin / Yea; Bob Packwood / R / Oregon / Nay; John Pastore / D / Rhode Island / Yea; James B. Pearson / R / Kansas / Nay; Claiborne Pell / D / Rhode Island / Yea; Charles H. Percy / R / Illinois / Yea; Winston L. Prouty / R / Vermont / Nay; William Proxmire / D / Wisconsin / Yea; Jennings Randolph / D / West Virginia / Nay; Abraham Ribicoff / D / Connecticut / Yea; William Roth / R / Delaware / Nay; William B. Saxbe / R / Ohio / Nay; Hugh Scott / R / Pennsylvania / Nay; Richard Schweiker / R / Pennsylvania / Yea; Margaret Chase Smith / R / Maine / Nay; John Sparkman / D / Alabama / Nay; John C. Stennis / D / Mississippi / Nay; Ted Stevens / R / Alaska / Nay; Adlai Stevenson III / D / Illinois / Yea; Stuart Symington / D / Missouri / Yea; Robert Taft Jr. / R / Ohio / Nay; Herman Talmadge / D / Georgia / Nay; Strom Thurmond / R / South Carolina / Nay; John Tower / R / Texas / Nay; John V. Tunney / D / California / Yea; Lowell Weicker / R / Connecticut / Nay; Harrison A. Williams / D / New Jersey / Yea; Milton Young / R / North Dakota / Yea

Not voting on the amendment but announced as opposed were Karl Mundt of South Dakota, and William Spong of Virginia. Not voting but announced in favor was William Fulbright of Arkansas.
