= W. I. Lincoln Adams =

American politician, banker and soldier (1865-1946)

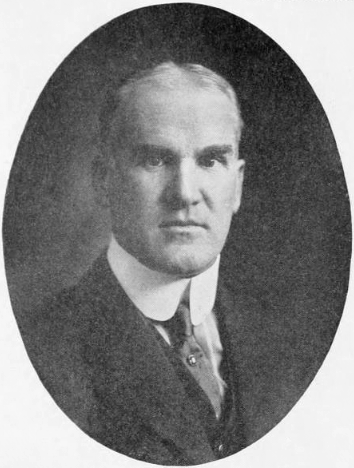
- Born: Washington Irving Lincoln Adams; February 22, 1865; New York, New York, US
- Died: January 20, 1946 (aged 80); Montclair, New Jersey, US
- Burial place: Arlington National Cemetery
- Political party: Republican
- Spouse: Grace Wilson Adams
- Children: 3

Washington Irving Lincoln Adams (February 22, 1865 – January 20, 1946) was an American printing and photography businessman, banker, soldier, and Republican Party politician from Montclair, New Jersey.

He was a leading businessman in the printing and photography industry, founding Ansco and leading the development of celluloid film. In 1912, he ran unsuccessfully for New Jersey's 10th congressional district.

== Early life and education ==
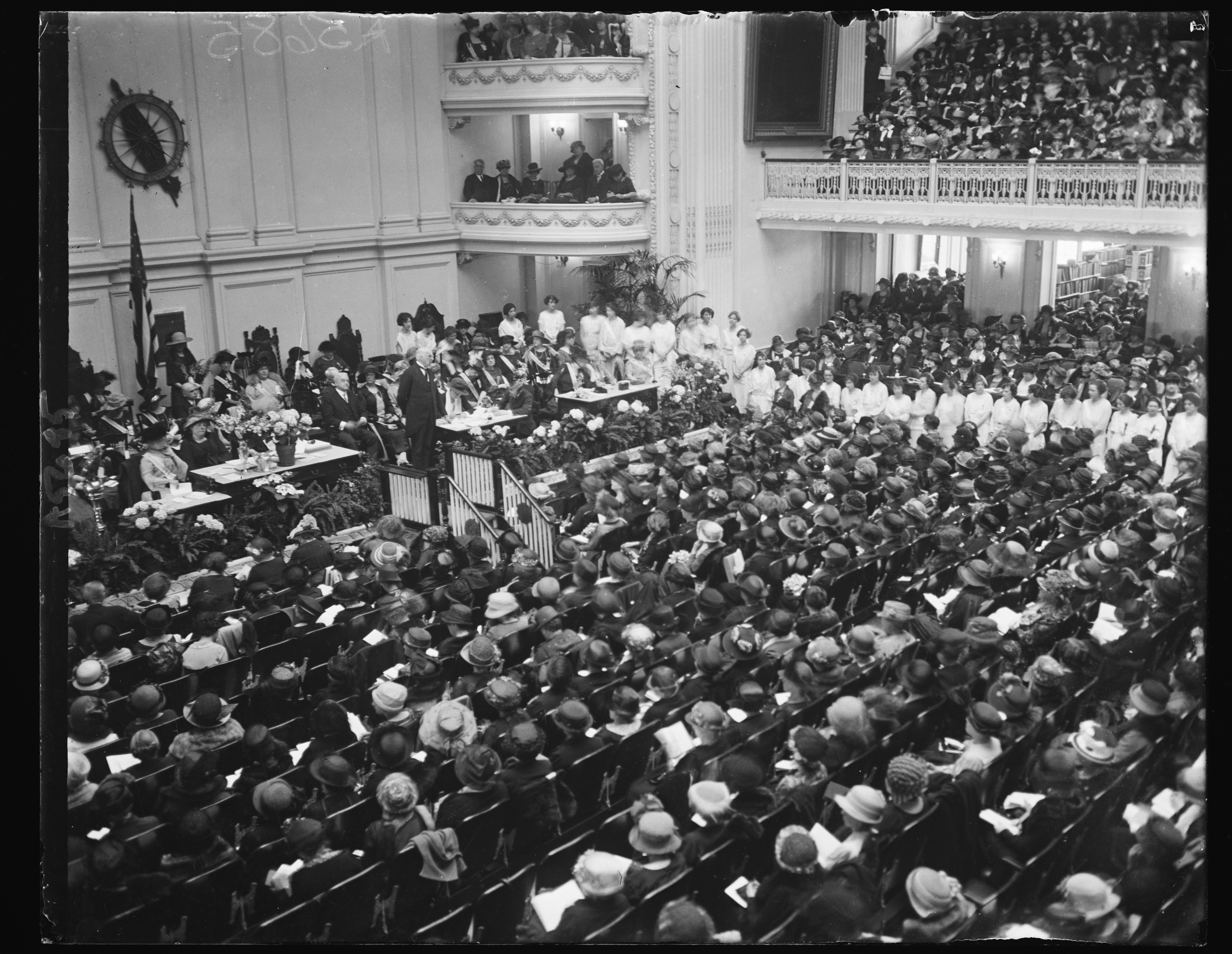
Adams at the D.A.R. congress

Washington Irving Lincoln Adams was born on February 22, 1865 in New York City to Washington Irving Adams and Marian Lydia (née Briggs) Adams. He was a direct descendant of Henry Adams, who settled in Braintree, Massachusetts in 1636, and through him, related to the Adams political family.

In 1868, the family moved to Montclair, New Jersey, where he was educated and graduated from Montclair High School in 1883.

== Business career ==
After graduating high school, Adams joined his father at The Photographic Times, a leading photographic magazine, as an editor. He also wrote a number of books on photographic subjects, which remained authoritative well into the next century. In 1894, he succeeded his father as president of the Scovill & Adams Company, manufacturers of photographic goods, which he later merged with the Anthony Company to form Ansco. In 1914, Ansco successfully won a lengthy litigation with Eastman Kodak to establish their patent for the celluloid film developed by Hannibal Goodwin of Newark, which was crucial to the growing film industry.

In 1900, Adams became treasurer of Styles & Cash, a prominent printing house, and succeeded Samuel D. Styles as its president a few years later. In 1914, banking and financial interests asked Adams to lead the reorganization of the large printing and lithography company Sackett & Wilhelms. He succeeded and was named its president, serving in that role until February 1916. Having restored the credit of the company and its standing in the industry, he resigned.

He was a founder and president of the Montclair Trust Company, the Murray Hill Trust Company, and the West Side Bank of New York. He also served as treasurer of the Montclair Holding Company, a real estate corporation. He joined the board of the Bloomfield Trust Company in 1910.

== Political career ==
Adams was a member of the Republican Party. He served as a delegate to the 1908 Republican National Convention.

Woodrow Wilson appointed Adams to the Interstate Pure Food Convention.

=== 1912 congressional campaign ===
In 1912, he was the Republican nominee for the United States House of Representatives in New Jersey's 10th congressional district, which included parts of Essex County. He challenged Democratic incumbent Edward W. Townsend, who had been elected in the 1910 Democratic landslide. Adams finished third behind Townsend and former assemblymember William F. Morgan, who ran on the Bull Moose Party ticket.

In 1916, Adams served as a presidential elector, casting his vote for the Republican ticket of Charles Evans Hughes and Charles W. Fairbanks. He was an unsuccessful candidate for elector in 1932.

In 1932, Adams was elected to the Montclair town commission and served until 1936.

== Military service ==
In 1916, Adams was active in organizing a battalion of volunteers for World War I in Montclair. He attended the citizens' training camp at Plattsburgh, New York. He completed a course as a member of Company F, Seventh Regiment and successfully passed the War Department examinations for a commission as a U.S. Army major in the reserve corps. He was called to active duty from August 18 to 20, 1918.

During the war, he was the Officer In Charge of Finance for the Eastern Division, Quartermaster Corps.

== Personal life and death ==
Adams married Grace Wilson on November 21, 1887. She was the descendant of American founding father James Wilson. They had five children, including Briggs Kilburn Adams, who graduated from Harvard College and was killed in action in France in 1918:

- Wilson Irving Adams (b. 1890, m. Helen Elizabeth Morrison)
- Marian Elizabeth Adams (b. 1891, m. David Oswald Pfaelzer)
- Briggs Kilburn Adams (b. 1893, d. 1918)
- Carolyn Styles Adams (b. 1896, d. 1910)
- Washington Irving Lincoln Adams Jr. (b. 1898)

In addition to their home in Montclair, the family maintained a country house near Littleton, New Hampshire.

Adams was a member of the Sons of the American Revolution and served as its New Jersey president from 1915 to 1917 and its national president general from 1922 until 1923. He was also a member of the Huguenot Society of America, the Society of the War of 1812, the Order of the Founders and Patriots of America, the New England Society, the St. Nicholas Society, the General Society of Colonial Wars, the New York City Republican Club, the Freemasons, and the Union League Club. Locally, he was a charter member of the Outlook Club of Montclair, senior trustee of the First Congregational Church of Montclair, a director of the Montclair YMCA, and a trustee of the New Jersey Historical Society.

He died from pneumonia at Mountainside Hospital in Montclair on January 20, 1946, and was buried at Arlington National Cemetery.
