= Charles R. Howell =

American politician (1904–1973)

Charles Robert Howell
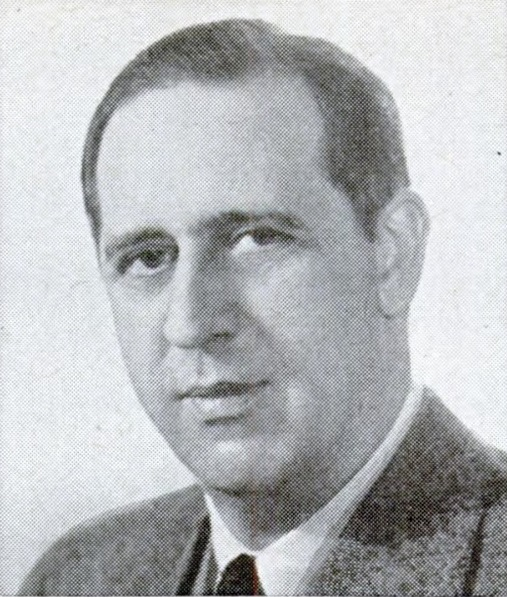
- Howell in 1953

Member of the U.S. House of Representatives from New Jersey's 4th district
- In office January 3, 1949 – January 3, 1955
- Preceded by: Frank A. Mathews, Jr.
- Succeeded by: Frank Thompson

Member of the New Jersey General Assembly
- In office 1944-1947

Personal details
- Born: April 23, 1904 Trenton, New Jersey, US
- Died: July 5, 1973 (aged 69) Trenton, New Jersey, US
- Party: Democratic

Charles Robert Howell (April 23, 1904 in Trenton, New Jersey – July 5, 1973 in Trenton, New Jersey) was an American Democratic Party politician who represented New Jersey's 4th congressional district in the United States House of Representatives for three terms from 1949 to 1955.

== Early life and career ==
Howell was born in Trenton, New Jersey on April 23, 1904. He attended the Trenton Public Schools and graduated from Hoosac School in Hoosick, New York. He was a student at Princeton University in 1923 and 1924 and took special courses at the University of Pennsylvania in 1936 and 1937.

Howell worked as an insurance broker in Trenton from 1928 to 1954. He was elected to the New Jersey General Assembly in 1944, reelected in 1945, and served until 1947.

== Congress ==
Howell was elected as a Democrat to the Eighty-first and to the two succeeding Congresses, serving in office from January 3, 1949 to January 3, 1955. He was not a candidate for renomination in 1954, but was an unsuccessful candidate for election to the United States Senate, losing by a narrow margin to Clifford P. Case. He was appointed New Jersey State Commissioner of Banking and Insurance in February 1955, serving until March 1, 1969. He was a delegate-at-large to the 1956 Democratic National Convention.

== Death ==
Howell died in Trenton on July 5, 1973. His remains were cremated, and the ashes scattered at sea off Point Pleasant Beach, New Jersey.

U.S. House of Representatives
Preceded by Frank A. Mathews, Jr.	Member of the U.S. House of Representatives from New Jersey's 4th congressional district January 3, 1949-January 3, 1955	Succeeded by Frank Thompson
Party political offices
Preceded by Edward J. Hart	Chairman of the New Jersey Democratic State Committee; 1953 – 1954	Succeeded by George E. Brunner
Preceded by Archibald S. Alexander	Democratic Nominee for the U.S. Senate (Class 2) from New Jersey; 1954	Succeeded by Thorn Lord
