= Robert Kean =

American politician (1893–1980)

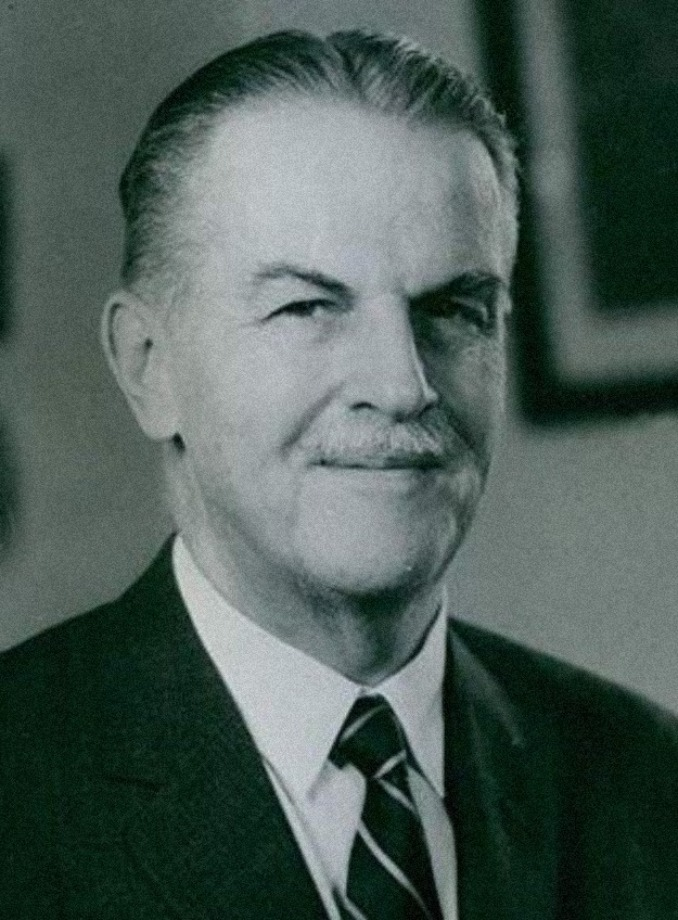
- Kean while serving

Member of the U.S. House of Representatives from New Jersey's 12th district
- In office January 3, 1939 – January 3, 1959
- Preceded by: Frank William Towey, Jr.
- Succeeded by: George M. Wallhauser

Personal details
- Born: Robert Winthrop Kean; September 28, 1893 Elberon, New Jersey, U.S.
- Died: September 21, 1980 (aged 86) Livingston, New Jersey, U.S.
- Party: Republican
- Spouse: Elizabeth Stuyvesant Howard (m. 1920)
- Relations: See Kean family
- Children: 6, including Thomas
- Education: Harvard University (BA)
- Occupation: Banker

Robert Winthrop Kean (September 28, 1893 – September 21, 1980) was an American Republican Party politician from the state of New Jersey. Kean represented parts of Essex County, New Jersey in the United States House of Representatives from 1939 to 1959. He retired from the House to run for United States Senate in 1958, but was defeated by Harrison A. Williams.

Kean was known for his expertise in the areas of taxation and Social Security. A member of the prestigious Kean family, Kean was the son of a U.S. senator (Hamilton Fish Kean) and the father of a governor of New Jersey (Thomas Kean).

== Early life, education, and military service ==
Kean was born September 28, 1893, in Elberon, New Jersey. His father, Hamilton F. Kean (1862–1941), was a United States Senator from New Jersey. Kean was a member of the Kean family, one of the nation's oldest political families.

Kean became involved in politics at a young age. In 1905, his uncle assisted in having him appointed as a U.S. Senate page so he could observe the Inauguration of President Theodore Roosevelt. Kean attended the 1912 Republican National Convention, where he was escorted by his uncle's secretary, Donald H. McLean, with whom he would later serve in Congress. Young Kean was a Roosevelt supporter, although his uncle and father had publicly endorsed the incumbent President, William Howard Taft.

Kean was a 1911 graduate of St. Mark's School and a 1915 graduate of Harvard University. He served in the National Guard and later in the United States Army during World War I earning the rank of lieutenant, the Silver Star, and the Distinguished Service Cross. He served under the command of General John J. Pershing.

== Career ==
After World War I, Kean worked in investment banking in New Jersey and New York City, heading a firm known as Kean, Taylor & Company. He was a founder of the Livingston National Bank. He also took on campaign responsibilities on behalf of his father, who was the Republican National Committeeman from New Jersey from 1918 to 1928. He was heavily involved in his father's successful campaign for the U.S. Senate in 1928 and his unsuccessful 1934 re-election bid.

=== U.S. Representative ===
Kean became a candidate for the U.S. House of Representatives in 1938, running in New Jersey's 12th congressional district, which was based in Essex County. Republicans had held the seat from 1914 until 1936, when Democrat Frank W. Towey, Jr. won it on the coattails of President Franklin Roosevelt's re-election. The seat was viewed as likely to return Republican, and six Republicans sought the nomination in the September 20 primary. Kean won by a narrow 713 vote margin, 13,923 to 13,210 over Montclair Town Commissioner Dallas S. Townsend. Kean was endorsed by the "Clean Government" faction of the Essex GOP, while Townsend had the backing of the "Suburban Republican" faction. In the General Election, Kean defeated Towey by 12,118 votes, 48,854 (55%) to 36,736 (41%).

Kean was re-elected in 1940 (54%), 1942 (61%), 1944 (51%), 1946 (64%), 1948 (51%), 1950 (53%), 1952 (55%), 1954 (53%), and 1956 (60%). He was not a candidate for re-election to an 11th term in 1958 and was succeeded by Republican George M. Wallhauser.

During his 20 years as a Congressman, Kean was the Ranking Minority Member of the House Ways and Means Committee and served on the House Banking and Currency Committee. He was considered an expert on Social Security and tax law, and was sometimes referred to as "Mr. Social Security" in Washington, D.C. Kean voted in favor of the Civil Rights Act of 1957.

=== U.S. Senate ambitions ===
Kean considered running for United States Senate in 1954. By early 1954, New Jersey Republican leaders had decided to withdraw party support for the incumbent senator, Robert C. Hendrickson. Kean had secured commitments of endorsements from several key GOP leaders, but he declined to announce his own campaign until Hendrickson declared his intentions publicly. Hendrickson waited until the day before the filing deadline to say he was retiring, and Kean did not run.

==== 1958 U.S. Senate campaign ====
U.S. Senator H. Alexander Smith decided not to seek re-election in 1958, and Kean became a candidate for the open seat in the United States Senate. He won the Republican primary by 23,894 votes over Bernard M. Shanley, who had served as Deputy Chief of Staff to President Dwight Eisenhower. Kean received 152,884 votes (43.00%) to Shanley's 128,990 (36.28%). Robert J. Morris, who had served as Chief Counsel to the United States Senate Subcommittee on Internal Security, finished third with 73,658 votes (20.72%). Kean lost the general election to Democrat Harrison A. Williams, 966,832 votes (51.39%) to 882,287 votes (46.90%).

=== Essex County Republican Chairman ===
Kean made a political comeback in 1959, challenging incumbent William Yeomans for Republican Chairman in Essex County. Essex County Republicans were divided into two factions. Kean organized a slate of reform candidates opposed to Yeomans headed by Alfred C. Clapp, a popular former state senator and judge. Yeomans backed Essex County Prosecutor Charles V. Webb, Jr. for the State Senate, but Clapp won the nomination by a massive 20,000 vote margin (72%-28%). All twelve Assembly candidates running on the Kean/Clapp line won their primaries. Yeomans dropped his re-election bid, clearing the way for Kean to take over.

Kean had a difficult time as a party leader. Democrats performed well in the 1959 and 1961 elections. Kean backed Bergen County State Senator Walter H. Jones, the losing candidate in the 1961 Republican gubernatorial primary. A Kean rival, former U.S. Attorney William F. Tompkins, challenged Kean for re-election in 1961 after Tompkins' candidate, former U.S. Secretary of Labor, James P. Mitchell, won the gubernatorial nomination. Kean defeated Tompkins, 409 to 268.

Kean stepped down as county chairman in 1962.

== Personal life and death ==
Kean married Elizabeth Stuyvesant Howard on October 18, 1920, in New York City. Following the death of his uncle, Alexander Kean, in 1922, Kean inherited an estate and mansion in Livingston, New Jersey, where they moved in 1924. They had six children: three sons, Robert, Hamilton, and Thomas, and three daughters, Elizabeth, Rose, and Katharine.

Kean's son, Thomas Kean, served as speaker of the New Jersey General Assembly, as governor of New Jersey, and as chairman of the 9/11 Commission following the September 11 attacks.

Kean's grandchildren include politician Thomas Kean Jr. and author Leslie Kean.

Kean died in Livingston on September 21, 1980, aged 86, at Saint Barnabas Medical Center following a heart attack.

== Honors ==
Kean University is named in honor of Robert Kean and the Kean family, and its Liberty Hall Campus houses the historic property and home of the Kean family.

== Electoral history ==
=== General elections ===
Office	Year	Republican	Votes	Democrat	Votes
U.S. House of Representatives	1938	Robert W. Kean	48,854	Frank W. Towey, Jr. (Incumbent)	36,736
U.S. House of Representatives	1940	Robert W. Kean	67,996	Thomas J. Holleran	53,677
U.S. House of Representatives	1942	Robert W. Kean	43,942	Joseph Siegler	26,188
U.S. House of Representatives	1944	Robert W. Kean	67,680	John W. Suling	63,087
U.S. House of Representatives	1946	Robert W. Kean	55,732	Raymond C. Connell	30,389
U.S. House of Representatives	1948	Robert W. Kean	63,232	Harry Dudkin	58,495
U.S. House of Representatives	1950	Robert W. Kean	54,123	Harry Dudkin	45,525
U.S. House of Representatives	1952	Robert W. Kean	84,949	Martin S. Fox	70,046
U.S. House of Representatives	1954	Robert W. Kean	59,151	Martin S. Fox	52,314
U.S. House of Representatives	1956	Robert W. Kean	90,032	Irving L. Hodes	58,364
United States Senate	1958	Robert W. Kean	882,287	Harrison A. Williams	966,832

=== Primary elections ===
Office	Year	Republican	Votes
U.S. House of Representatives	1938	Robert W. Kean	13,923
U.S. House of Representatives	1938	Dallas S. Townsend	13,210
U.S. House of Representatives	1938	Harold W. Phillhower	2,161
U.S. House of Representatives	1938	Maurice J. McKeown	777
U.S. House of Representatives	1938	A. Frank Zega	442
U.S. House of Representatives	1938	Clarence A. Seaman	431
United States Senate	1958	Robert W. Kean	152,884
United States Senate	1958	Bernard M. Shanley	128,990
United States Senate	1958	Robert J. Morris	73,658

U.S. House of Representatives
Preceded by Frank Towey	Member of the U.S. House of Representatives from New Jersey's 12th congressional district 1939 – 1959	Succeeded by George Wallhauser
Party political offices
Preceded by Howard Alexander Smith	Republican Nominee for the U.S. Senate (Class 1) from New Jersey; 1958	Succeeded by Bernard M. Shanley
