= George M. Wallhauser =

American politician

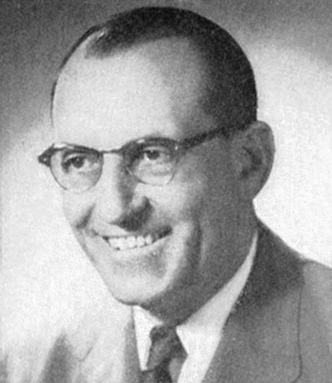
- Wallhauser, c. 1963

Member of the U.S. House of Representatives from New Jersey's 12th district
- In office January 3, 1959 – January 3, 1965
- Preceded by: Robert Kean
- Succeeded by: Paul J. Krebs

Personal details
- Born: February 10, 1900 Newark, New Jersey, U.S.
- Died: August 4, 1993 (aged 93) Livingston, New Jersey, U.S.
- Party: Republican
- Spouse: Isabel Towne (m. 1926; died 1981)
- Children: 2, including George M. Wallhauser Jr.
- Parent(s): Henry Wallhauser; Rachel Apolonia Vogt
- Education: University of Pennsylvania (BA); Columbia University
- Occupation: Realtor; politician

Military service
- Allegiance: United States
- Branch: United States Navy; United States Navy Reserve
- Years of service: 1918–1922
- Rank: hospital corpsman
- Conflict: World War I

George Marvin Wallhauser (February 10, 1900 – August 4, 1993) was an American real estate businessman and Republican Party politician from New Jersey who represented Newark and suburban Essex County in the United States House of Representatives from 1959 to 1965.

== Early life and education ==
Wallhauser was born in Newark, New Jersey on February 10, 1900 to Dr. Henry Joseph Frederick and Rachel Apolonia (née Vogt) Wallhauser. He attended Newark public schools and graduated from Barringer High School in 1918. He entered the United States Navy the same year and served as a hospital corpsman in the Naval Reserve until 1922.

In 1922, he graduated from the University of Pennsylvania with an A.B., where he was a member of Phi Sigma Kappa fraternity. He later studied real estate appraisal at Columbia University.

== Business career ==
Wallhauser was associated with the United States Realty and Investment Company in Newark for 62 years, joining the company in 1927 and retiring as senior vice president and member of the board in 1989. He specialized in commercial property in northern New Jersey and also served as company treasurer.

== Political career ==
From 1946 to 1947, Wallhauser served as chair of the Maplewood planning board, which issued the township's first master plan. He was a member of the township committee from 1954 to 1956, where he chaired the committee on the construction of two new libraries and the committee on murals.

=== U.S. House of Representatives (1959–65) ===
==== Elections ====
Wallhauser was elected to the United States House of Representatives in 1958, succeeding Robert Kean as the representative for the 12th congressional district. At the time, the district included the South Ward of Newark, Irvington, Maplewood, Millburn, Livingston and municipalities in western Essex County. He was reelected twice in 1960 and 1962, but he did not seek re-election in 1964. He was succeeded by Paul J. Krebs.

===== Tenure =====
Serving in the 86th Congress through 88th Congress, Wallhauser was a member of the House Committee on the Post Office and Civil Service, where he championed federal pay raises and improvements for postal workers, whose salaries lagged behind the private sector.

Wallhauser was a founding member of the Wednesday Club, a discussion group for moderate Republicans, and served as state chair of Nelson Rockefeller's 1964 presidential campaign.

=== Later political career ===
In 1970, Governor William T. Cahill appointed Wallhauser to the New Jersey Highway Authority, and he served as its chairman from 1972 to 1975.

== Personal life and death ==
Wallhauser married Isabel Towne in 1926. She died in 1981. They had two children, George Jr. and Henry. George Jr. served as the Essex County Republican chair and was the Republican nominee for New Jersey's 11th congressional district in 1968.

Wallhauser lived in Maplewood for 63 years until his death from heart failure on August 4, 1993, in Livingston. In addition to his political work, he served as chairman of the Paper Mill Playhouse, a Maplewood youth baseball coach and chair of the town's junior football committee. He also maintained a summer home at Greenwood Lake, New York.

U.S. House of Representatives
| Preceded by Robert Kean | Member of the U.S. House of Representatives from New Jersey's 12th congressional district 1959 – 1965 | Succeeded by Paul J. Krebs |
