= Salvatore A. Bontempo =

American politician

Salvatore A. Bontempo (August 14, 1909 – June 20, 1989) was an American Democratic Party politician who served as chairman of the New Jersey Democratic State Committee.

== Early life and education ==
Bontempo was born in Newark, New Jersey in 1909. After graduating from the University of Notre Dame and the John Marshall Law School (now Seton Hall University School of Law), he became active in Newark city government, serving as director of purchasing from 1933 to 1942.

=== Military service ===
He joined the United States Army Air Forces during World War II, and eventually reached the rank of colonel in the Air Force Reserves.

== Career ==
He was elected to the Newark City Commission in 1953. From 1958 to 1961 he served as New Jersey's Commissioner of Conservation and Economic Development. In that position he led a drive for development of the New Jersey Meadowlands and also worked to preserve open space by acquiring land through the state's Green Acres program. In 1961 he briefly served in the State Department as administrator of the Bureau of Security and Consular Affairs, after which time he left to work in the private sector.

In 1969 Bontempo was selected chairman of the New Jersey Democratic State Committee. In the 1972 Democratic presidential primaries, he supported Hubert H. Humphrey, who lost New Jersey by a huge margin to George McGovern. He left the party chairmanship in 1973. From 1975 to 1977 he served as chairman of the New Jersey Highway Authority, overseeing the Garden State Parkway and the Garden State Arts Center (now PNC Bank Arts Center).

Bontempo died of cancer in 1989 at the age of 79 at his home in Florham Park, New Jersey.

Party political offices
Preceded by Robert J. Burkhardt	Chairman of the New Jersey Democratic State Committee; 1969 – 1973	Succeeded by James P. Dugan
