= Clifford P. Case =

American politician (1904–1982)

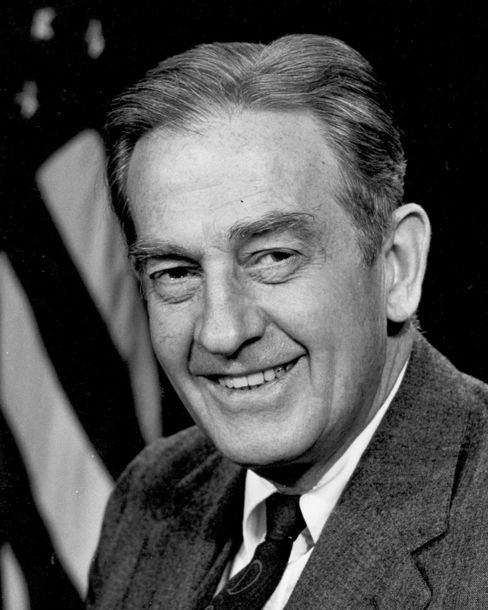

United States Senator from New Jersey
- In office January 3, 1955 – January 3, 1979
- Preceded by: Robert C. Hendrickson
- Succeeded by: Bill Bradley

Member of the U.S. House of Representatives from New Jersey's 6th district
- In office January 3, 1945 – August 16, 1953
- Preceded by: Donald H. McLean
- Succeeded by: Harrison A. Williams

Member of the New Jersey General Assembly
- In office 1943–1945

Personal details
- Born: Clifford Philip Case Jr. April 16, 1904 Franklin Park, New Jersey, U.S.
- Died: March 5, 1982 (aged 77) Washington, D.C., U.S.
- Resting place: Somerville Cemetery
- Party: Republican
- Spouse: Ruth Miriam Smith (m. 1928)
- Children: 3
- Education: Rutgers University (BA); Columbia University (LLB)

Clifford Philip Case Jr. (April 16, 1904 – March 5, 1982), was an American lawyer and politician. For over 30 years, Case represented the state of New Jersey as a member of the Republican Party in both the U.S. House of Representatives (1945–1953) and the U.S. Senate (1955–1979).

Case began his life in politics in 1937, serving in the Rahway Common Council from 1938 to 1942. He then served one term in the New Jersey General Assembly, from 1943 to 1945, before being elected to represent New Jersey's 6th congressional district from 1945 to 1953. As one of the most left-leaning Republicans of the House, Case was supportive of President Harry S. Truman's Fair Deal and Marshall Plan programs. After an unsuccessful attempt at the Republican nomination for the 1953 New Jersey gubernatorial election, Case became president of the Ford Foundation's Fund for the Republic.

After Robert C. Hendrickson's retirement, Case defeated fellow U.S. Representative Charles R. Howell for Hendrickson's seat in the United States Senate. In the Senate, Case was one of the strongest supporters of Democratic presidents John F. Kennedy and Lyndon B. Johnson's New Frontier and Great Society programs. Case's support of civil rights for African-Americans and welfare programs often put him at odds with the right wing of the Republican Party. Initially supportive of the Vietnam War, Case began to have doubts about the war, supporting the McGovern-Hatfield Amendment, and co-sponsoring the Case-Church Amendment with Idaho Senator Frank Church. In 1978, Case lost renomination to his Senate seat against fellow Republican Jeffrey Bell, who ran to his right. After leaving the Senate, Case returned to practicing law. A heavy smoker, Case died of lung cancer in 1982.

== Early life and education ==
The oldest of six children, Clifford Case was born in the Franklin Park section of Franklin Township, New Jersey, to Clifford Philip and Jeannette McAlpin (née Benedict) Case. His father was a minister in the Dutch Reformed Church. His father was also a staunch Republican who even canceled his subscription to The New York Times after it endorsed Woodrow Wilson in the 1912 presidential election. His uncle, Clarence E. Case, served as a member of the New Jersey Senate and as Chief Justice of the New Jersey Supreme Court. His great-grandfather was a court crier in Somerset County.

After serving at Six Mile Run Reformed Church in Franklin Park, his father accepted a position as pastor in Poughkeepsie, New York, in 1907. Case received his early education at public schools in Poughkeepsie, and graduated from Poughkeepsie High School in 1921. His class predicted he would become vice president of the United States, adding, "His good nature, however, and his stubborn hair will keep the Cabinet happy and harmonious." Following his high school graduation, he enrolled at Rutgers University in 1921. His father died the year before, and Case helped pay for his tuition by working part-time jobs, including playing the pipe organ in church on Sundays. At Rutgers, he was a member of the varsity lacrosse team, the Glee Club, the Rutgers chapter of Delta Upsilon, Phi Beta Kappa society, and Cap and Skull. He graduated with a Bachelor of Arts degree in 1925.

Case then studied at Columbia Law School, receiving his Bachelor of Laws degree in 1928. That same year, he married Ruth Miriam Smith, whom he had met in his junior year at Rutgers. The couple remained married until his death; they had two daughters, Mary Jane and Ann, and one son, Clifford Philip III.

== Early career ==
In 1928, Case was admitted to the bar in New York and joined the law firm of Simpson Thacher & Bartlett in New York City, where he remained until 1953. He returned to New Jersey, living in Rahway while commuting to work in New York City. He entered politics in 1937, when he was elected to the Rahway Common Council, serving from 1938 to 1942. From 1943 to 1945, he was a member of the New Jersey General Assembly.

== U.S. Representative ==
In 1944, Case successfully ran for the U.S. House of Representatives from New Jersey's 6th congressional district. He defeated his Democratic opponent, Walter H. Van Hoesen, by a margin of 55% to 43%. He was subsequently re-elected to four more terms, never receiving less than 55% of the vote. In 1952, he won 20,000 more votes than any other candidate ever received in his district and won 10,000 more votes than Dwight D. Eisenhower's majority. During his entire tenure, Case's district was coterminous with Union County.

As a member of the House, Case earned a reputation as a liberal Republican, frequently receiving the endorsement of the Americans for Democratic Action, Congress of Industrial Organizations, and American Federation of Labor. He once said, "If the needs of this country are not met by middle-of-the-road progressivism, the problems won't be met, and the time will come when only extremist solutions are possible." A strong supporter of the civil rights movement, he voted in favor of an anti-poll tax measure, a proposal to prevent segregation in the Women's Reserve of the Coast Guard, and the creation of a Fair Employment Practices Commission to prohibit discrimination in the workforce. He also opposed the establishment of a permanent House Un-American Activities Committee and the overriding of President Harry S. Truman's veto of the Immigration and Nationality Act of 1952. He served on the Civil Service, Education, and Judiciary Committees.

In 1953, Case was an unsuccessful candidate for the Republican nomination for Governor of New Jersey. In August of that year, he resigned from the House to become president of the Ford Foundation's Fund for the Republic, an organization dedicated to protecting freedom of speech and other civil liberties in the United States. He served in that position until March 1954.

== U.S. Senate ==
In 1954, after Republican incumbent Robert C. Hendrickson declined to run for re-election, Case announced his candidacy for Hendrickson's seat in the U.S. Senate. After winning the Republican primary, he faced fellow U.S. Representative Charles R. Howell in the general election. During the campaign, Case openly criticized Senator Joseph McCarthy, and pledged to vote against seating McCarthy on any committee with investigative functions. McCarthy's supporters called him "a pro-Communist Republicrat" and "Stalin's choice for Senator." The Star-Ledger quoted former Communist Party leader Bella Dodd as saying that Case's sister Adelaide was "an active member of several Communist front groups." It was later revealed, however, that the Adelaide Case in question was not the candidate's sister but a college professor who had died in 1948. A conservative faction within the Republican Party unsuccessfully attempted to force Case off the ballot, also proposing a write-in campaign for former U.S. Representative Fred A. Hartley Jr., co-author of the Taft-Hartley Act. Case was endorsed by President Eisenhower and Vice President Richard M. Nixon. In 1959, William F. Buckley Jr.'s National Review magazine in the article "Hopeless Case" appraised Case's liberal positions within the Republican Party.

On November 2, 1954, Case narrowly defeated Howell by a margin of 3,369 votes. It was the closest Senate election in New Jersey's history, and a recount was held on December 14. Case won the recount by 3,507 votes. In the Senate, he compiled one of the most liberal records of any Republican, being one of the most supportive Republicans of the New Frontier and the Great Society. Notoriously, Case was the only Republican in the Senate to support Senator Clinton Anderson's medical care bill proposal supported by President Kennedy. He was re-elected in 1960, 1966, and 1972. Case voted in favor of the Civil Rights Acts of 1957, 1960, 1964, and 1968, as well as the 24th Amendment to the U.S. Constitution, the Voting Rights Act of 1965, and the confirmation of Thurgood Marshall to the U.S. Supreme Court. Case was one of thirteen Senate Republicans to vote in favor of the creation of the Medicare program for the aged. Alongside Jacob Javits (R-NY), John Sherman Cooper (R-KY), Thomas Kuchel (R-CA), Hugh Scott (R-PA) and Margaret Chase Smith (R-ME), Case was supportive of a repeal of the right-to-work section of the Taft-Hartley Act. During his time in the Senate, Case received zero ratings from the Americans for Constitutional Action in 1971, 1974, and 1976 and often got ratings in the high nineties from the Americans for Democratic Action organization. From 1973 to 1978, Case, along with fellow Republican senators Jacob Javits and Edward Brooke, is seen by GovTrack as being to the left of Democrats like Hubert Humphrey, George McGovern, Edmund Muskie and Gaylord Nelson.

When Case was asked why he was a member of the Republican Party instead of the Democratic Party, he replied: "I am a Republican, and I believe in the Republican Party. But I have my own convictions as to what the Republican Party should stand for, and I intend to fight for them as hard as I can. And I will not be driven away from my Republicanism simply because some Democrats happen to agree with me on certain issues - and some Republicans don't."

Despite his liberalism, Case saw himself as a conservative in the vein of Edmund Burke, Benjamin Disraeli, Winston Churchill, and the Federalist Papers.

In 1966, along with two other Republican senators and five Republican representatives, Case signed a telegram sent to Georgia Governor Carl E. Sanders regarding the Georgia legislature's refusal to seat the recently elected Julian Bond in their state House of Representatives. This refusal, said the telegram, was "a dangerous attack on representative government. None of us agree with Mr. Bond's views on the Vietnam War; in fact we strongly repudiate these views. But unless otherwise determined by a court of law, which the Georgia Legislature is not, he is entitled to express them."

At the 1968 Republican National Convention, Case attempted to hold the New Jersey's delegation's 40 votes as a favorite son candidate to prevent Richard Nixon being selected on the first ballot and thus give Case's preferred candidate, Nelson Rockefeller, a chance of being chosen in later ballots. Case failed to hold the delegation together and 18 delegates deserted Case's favorite son candidacy for Nixon. Nixon was nominated on the first ballot. Case was a co-author of the Case-Zablocki Act of 1972 which required that executive agreements by the president be reported to Congress in 60 days. Originally supportive of the Vietnam War in the 60's, he grew more critical of American involvement in Vietnam, supporting the McGovern-Hatfield Amendment in 1970 and co-sponsored the Case–Church Amendment which prohibited further U.S. military activity in Vietnam, Laos and Cambodia in 1973.

Alongside Jacob Javits, John Sherman Cooper and William B. Saxbe, Case was one of four Republican co-sponsors of Ted Kennedy's "Health Security Act" in 1971, which would have provided health coverage to every American through an insurance program run by the federal government. In a speech advocating for universal coverage through the Health Security Act, Case stated:

Mr. President, I am pleased to join Senators Kennedy, Cooper, and Saxbe as cosponsor of S.3, the Health Security Act of 1971. Today the question of national health insurance is not whether we should have a national health program. The facts dictate that we do. It is rather, what kind of program, will best serve all our people. It is shocking that medical care is so difficult to obtain, and that so many people have little or no health coverage at all, when America is spending $63 billion a year on health care. This sum amounts to 7 percent of our gross national product, or about $300 for every man, woman, and child. Despite the fact that we spend more on health care than any other nation, America lags behind most industrial nations in health standards. Clearly something must be done to change the system by which medical care and services are delivered. It must be made more equitable and much more efficient. In a country as wealthy and resourceful as ours, there is no reason why every citizen, rich or poor, young or old, working or unemployed, should be denied the right to good healthcare. As one of the earliest supporters of Medicare and as a member of the Senate Appropriations Subcommittee dealing with health, I have long believed that we must do better in making health care a matter of national priority. The Health Security Act of 1971 is the product of months of study by outstanding citizens involved in health care and many other areas of human and social concern. It is my hope that the proposal will be carefully considered this year and that the 92nd Congress will enact legislation establishing a system capable of making quality health care available to every citizen of the United States.

Case sought a fifth Senate term in 1978, but lost the Republican primary to Jeffrey Bell, an anti-tax conservative. Case criticized Bell's support of a tax cut bill introduced by Congressman Jack Kemp, believing that it would cause tremendous inflation. Bell went on to lose the general election to Democrat Bill Bradley, a former professional basketball player. No Republican has been elected to represent New Jersey in the Senate since Case's last victory in 1972 (though Republicans Nicholas F. Brady and Jeffrey Chiesa have served as appointees).

== Later life and death ==
After leaving the Senate, Case resumed the practice of law with Curtis, Mallet-Prevost, Colt & Mosle, a New York law firm. Case also lectured at Rutgers University's Eagleton Institute of Politics. He died from lung cancer at Georgetown University Hospital in Washington on March 5, 1982, and was interred at the Somerville New Cemetery in Somerville, New Jersey.

After Case's death, friend and colleague Peter Rodino said of him:

Speaking personally, I have never met a more decent human being than Clifford Case. He taught us how to live with dignity, and how to serve the people with integrity and honor. I join with his wife Ruth, the rest of his family and all the citizens of New Jersey in mourning the loss of this giant of a man. I hope that as we honor Cliff Case today we can learn from the man and his principles which helped to chart a certain portion of our Nation's history——for they are timeless in their simplicity and strength.

His grandson, former Clinton Mayor Matthew Holt, was elected to the Hunterdon County Board of Chosen Freeholders in 2005. He ran for the General Assembly seat in the 23rd legislative district that was vacated by Marcia A. Karrow in January 2009.

U.S. House of Representatives
Preceded by Donald H. McLean	Member of the U.S. House of Representatives from New Jersey's 6th congressional district January 3, 1945 – August 16, 1953	Succeeded by Harrison A. Williams
U.S. Senate
Preceded by Robert C. Hendrickson	U.S. senator (Class 2) from New Jersey; January 3, 1955 – January 3, 1979; Served alongside: H. Alexander Smith, Harrison A. Williams	Succeeded by Bill Bradley
Preceded by George Aiken	Ranking Member of the Senate Foreign Relations Committee; 1975–1979	Succeeded by Jacob Javits
Party political offices
Preceded by Robert C. Hendrickson	Republican Nominee for the U.S. Senate (Class 2) from New Jersey; 1954, 1960, 1966, 1972	Succeeded by Jeffrey Bell
