= Ellery Akers =

American writer and artist

- Born: 1946 (age 79–80)
- Education: Harvard University (BA); San Francisco State University (MA)
- Occupations: Poet, artist
- Relatives: Anthony B. Akers (father); Andra Akers (sister); John Russell Pope (grandfather); William Ellery

Ellery Akers (born 1946) is an American writer and artist living on the Northern California coast. She is the author of three poetry collections: Swerve: Environmentalism, Feminism, and Resistance; Practicing the Truth and Knocking on the Earth, as well as a children's novel, Sarah’s Waterfall.

== Early life and education ==
Akers is the daughter of Anthony B. Akers, an attorney and diplomat who served as U.S. Ambassador to New Zealand during the Kennedy Administration. Her maternal grandfather was architect John Russell Pope. Her sister, Andra Akers, was a character actress. Akers is a distant relative of William Ellery, a jurist and signer of the United States Declaration of Independence. Ellery received a B.A. from Radcliffe College and an M.A. from San Francisco State University.

== Career ==
Akers has won thirteen national writing awards, including the 2014 Autumn House Poetry Prize, the John Masefield Award, the Poetry International Prize, and Sierra magazine's Nature Writing Award. Her poetry has been featured on National Public Radio and American Life in Poetry and has appeared in such journals as The American Poetry Review, New York Times Magazine and The Sun.

She has taught writing at Cabrillo College, Humboldt State University, Skyline College, Community of Writers, and Foothill College. She has also taught private poetry workshops. Among her honors are fellowships from the MacDowell Colony, Ucross Foundation, and Headlands Center for the Arts.

== Works ==
- Swerve: Environmentalism, Feminism, and Resistance, Blue Light Press (January 24, 2020)
- Practicing the Truth, Autumn House Press, 2015 ISBN
- Sarah's Waterfall: A Healing Story About Sexual Abuse, Safer Society Press, 2009 ISBN
- Knocking on the Earth, Wesleyan University Press, 1989, ISBN

== Anthologies ==
- The Place That Inhabits Us, Sixteen Rivers Press, 2010
- Short Takes: Model Essays for Composition, Elizabeth Penfield, Longman, 2006
- Inventions of Farewell: A Book of Elegies, Sandra M. Gilbert, Norton, 2001
- Stories From Where We Live: The California Coast, Sara St. Antoine, Milkweed, 2001
- Intimate Nature: The Bond Between Women and Animals, Linda Hogan, Deena Metzger, and Brenda Peterson, Ballantine, 1998.
