= William Clark (judge) =

American judge (1891–1957)

Judge of the United States Court of Appeals for the Third Circuit
- In office June 25, 1938 – March 24, 1943
- Appointed by: Franklin D. Roosevelt
- Preceded by: Joseph Whitaker Thompson
- Succeeded by: Gerald McLaughlin

Judge of the United States District Court for the District of New Jersey
- In office May 21, 1925 – June 25, 1938
- Appointed by: Calvin Coolidge
- Preceded by: Charles Francis Lynch
- Succeeded by: Thomas Glynn Walker

Personal details
- Born: February 1, 1891 Newark, New Jersey, U.S.
- Died: October 10, 1957 (aged 66) Colombo, Sri Lanka
- Party: Republican
- Spouses: Marjory Bruce Blair (m. 1913; div. 1947) Sonia Tomara (m. 1947)
- Relations: J. Donald Cameron
- Children: Anne Clark Martindell; Ledyard Blair Clark; J. William Clark
- Education: Harvard University (BA, MA, LLB)

Military service
- Allegiance: United States of America
- Branch/service: United States Army
- Years of service: 1917–1918; 1942–1945
- Rank: Colonel
- Battles/wars: World War I World War II
- Awards: Silver Star

William Clark (February 1, 1891 – October 10, 1957) was a United States circuit judge of the United States Court of Appeals for the Third Circuit and previously was a United States district judge of the United States District Court for the District of New Jersey.

== Early life and education ==
Clark was born on February 1, 1891, in Newark, New Jersey. His parents were John William Clark (1867–1928), and Margaretta Cameron Clark (1869–1941). He had two brothers, John Balfour Clark, who became president of the Clark Thread Company, and James Cameron Clark. His father was president of the Clark Thread Company of Newark (Clark Thread Co. later merged with J. & P. Coats to become Coats & Clark Inc.).

His maternal grandfather was U.S. Senator and Secretary of War during the Grant administration, J. Donald Cameron, who himself was the son of Simon Cameron, also a U.S. Senator and the Secretary of War during the Lincoln administration. His paternal grandfather was a brother of William Clark, the founder of the Clark Thread Company in the United States.

He studied at the Newark Academy and St. Mark's School and earned successive degrees at Harvard University, starting with a Bachelor of Arts degree at the age of 20 in 1911, followed by a Master of Arts degree a year later, and finally a Bachelor of Law from Harvard Law School in 1915.

== Career ==
Two years after graduating from Harvard Law, when the United States entered World War I, he joined the United States Army going to France. He stayed with the Army until 1918, rising to the rank of captain and receiving a Silver Star for gallantry in action. In 1920, Clark entered the practice of law in Newark until 1923, when he became a judge of the New Jersey Court of Errors and Appeals. He served for one year.

=== Federal judicial service ===
Clark, a Republican, received a recess appointment from President Calvin Coolidge on May 21, 1925, to a seat on the United States District Court for the District of New Jersey vacated by Judge Charles Francis Lynch. He was nominated to the same position by President Coolidge on December 8, 1925. He was confirmed by the United States Senate on December 17, 1925, and received his commission the same day. His service terminated on June 25, 1938, due to his elevation to the Third Circuit.

Clark was nominated by President Franklin D. Roosevelt on June 10, 1938, to a seat on the United States Court of Appeals for the Third Circuit vacated by Judge Joseph Whitaker Thompson. He was confirmed by the United States Senate on June 16, 1938, and received his commission on June 25, 1938. His service terminated on March 24, 1943, due to his resignation.

==== Notable cases ====
Clark presided over many patent cases, only three of which were overturned by 1930.

In 1930, in the case of United States v. Sprague, Clark ruled that the Eighteenth Amendment was invalid on the grounds that its ratification by State Legislatures was not the method prescribed by the United States Constitution for amendments effecting a transfer of power from the individual states to the United States.

=== World War II ===
On March 24, 1943, Clark resigned his judgeship and became a full-time member of the United States Army, this time as part of World War II. He was originally commissioned a lieutenant colonel. His service lasted until the war's conclusion in 1945, rising to the rank of colonel after 32 months spent overseas. Upon his return to the United States, Clark sued the government under the G.I. Bill for his seat on the bench back. A unanimous decision by the United States Court of Claims held that he was not entitled to resume his post he left to rejoin to Army. In January 1948, he was appointed a civilian member of the legal staff of Genenal Lucius D. Clay, who was commanding the occupation forces in Germany. In 1949, Clark became the chief justice of the Allied High Commission Court of Appeals in Nuremberg, Germany. He stayed in this position until 1954, after being informed in 1953 that he was not going to be reappointed Chief Justice due to the diminishing amount of work for the court to preside over.

== Personal life ==
On September 20, 1913, Clark married Marjory Bruce Blair (1893–1975), daughter of investment banker C. Ledyard Blair. Eight hundred guests were invited to the celebration at the Blairsden Mansion in Peapack-Gladstone, New Jersey, not far from the Clark family's own estate, Peachcroft. Before their divorce in 1947, they had three children, a daughter and two sons:

- Anne Clark (1914–2008), who served in the New Jersey Senate and as United States Ambassador to New Zealand.
- Ledyard Blair Clark (1917–2000), who was a prominent journalist and Democratic Party activist.
- J. William Clark

On October 4, 1947, Clark married for the second time to Sonia Tomara (1897–1982), a foreign correspondent for the New York Herald Tribune, in Paris. Clark died of a heart attack on October 10, 1957, while on vacation in Colombo, Sri Lanka.

Legal offices
Preceded by Charles Francis Lynch	Judge of the United States District Court for the District of New Jersey; 1925–1938	Succeeded by Thomas Glynn Walker
Preceded by Joseph Whitaker Thompson	Judge of the United States Court of Appeals for the Third Circuit; 1938–1943	Succeeded by Gerald McLaughlin
