= Blair Clark =

American journalist and activist (1917–2000)

- Born: Ledyard Blair Clark; August 22, 1917; East Hampton, New York, U.S.
- Died: June 6, 2000 (aged 82); Princeton, New Jersey, U.S.
- Education: St. Mark's School; Harvard University (AB)
- Political party: Democratic
- Spouses: Jessie Holladay Philbin (m. 1941; div. 1960) Joanna Rostropowicz (m. 1971)
- Children: 4, including Tom (stepson)
- Father: William Clark
- Relatives: Anne Clark Martindell (sister); C. Ledyard Blair (grandfather)

Ledyard Blair Clark (August 22, 1917 – June 6, 2000) was an American liberal journalist and political activist who played key roles both as a journalist and a political operator. He was general manager and vice president of CBS News from 1961 to 1964, and later became editor of The Nation magazine. He was Senator Eugene McCarthy's national campaign manager for the 1968 presidential nomination.

== Early life ==
Clark was born in East Hampton, New York, in 1917, the son of Wiliam Clark (1891–1957) and Marjory (née Blair) Clark (1893–1975). He was named after his maternal grandfather, investment banker C. Ledyard Blair. He was raised in Princeton, New Jersey and attended boarding school at St. Mark's School in Southborough, Massachusetts. In 1940 he graduated with an A.B. degree from Harvard College, where he was a member of the Spee Club and Hasty Pudding Institute of 1770. He was also the editor and president of The Harvard Crimson.

Clark had a knack for connecting with talented and ambitious people. At St. Mark's School, Clark became friends with poet Robert Lowell. At Harvard he befriended classmate John F. Kennedy; they remained in touch throughout Kennedy's political career, and Clark and Jacqueline Kennedy Onassis corresponded for decades. Journalist Theodore H. White was also a long-time contact.

== Career ==
From 1941 to 1946, Clark reported for the Joseph Pulitzer Jr.-owned St. Louis Post-Dispatch before serving in the United States Army.

=== New Hampshire Sunday News ===
In 1946, Clark used a $60,000 inheritance from his grandmother to found The New Hampshire Sunday News. The newspaper's star reporter was Ben Bradlee, who was also an alumnus of St. Mark's and Harvard and later become executive editor of The Washington Post. Within two years, the Sunday News had the highest circulation in New Hampshire. When the New Hampshire Union Leader threatened to compete with its own Sunday paper, Clark sold the Sunday News to Union-Leader Corporation in 1948 for a substantial profit.

During World War II, Clark served in the Army as deputy historian for Gen. George S. Patton Jr.'s 3rd Army.

=== CBS ===
In 1953, he joined CBS News in Paris, and later became producer and anchor of The World Tonight on the CBS Radio Network, now known as the nighttime edition of the CBS World News Roundup. In 1961, President John F. Kennedy offered Clark the ambassadorship to Mexico, but instead he became general manager and vice president of CBS News. He expanded the radio and television coverage of CBS News by hiring additional correspondents in the United States and abroad. He worked with Edward R. Murrow, and among those he hired at CBS were Walter Cronkite, Dan Rather, Mike Wallace, Morley Safer, Roger Mudd and Bill Plante.

After leaving CBS, Clark was associate publisher of the New York Post, editor of The Nation magazine, and a fellow of the New York Institute for Humanities at New York University. He was an influential early supporter of The New York Review of Books. Subsequently, he taught at New York University and Princeton University.

=== Career in politics ===
Clark first met Senator Eugene McCarthy in 1965 at a party at Walter Lippmann's house in Washington, D.C. Two years later, when McCarthy announced that he would challenge President Lyndon Johnson in the 1968 Democratic primaries as an anti-war candidate, Clark wrote to McCarthy from London to express his support. With his friend, Theodore H. White, Clark traveled to Chicago in December 1967 to hear McCarthy address the Conference of Concerned Democrats, a group of anti-war activists. Soon after meeting in Chicago, McCarthy asked Clark to be his campaign manager.

In his new position within the campaign, Clark set about convincing McCarthy to enter the New Hampshire primary. McCarthy had initially planned to skip New Hampshire and begin campaigning in Wisconsin. The case to run in New Hampshire was laid out by two members of the New Hampshire delegation of the Conference of Concerned Democrats: Dartmouth College official David C. Hoeh and St. Paul's School teacher (and future congressman) Gerry Studds. After more convincing from Clark, McCarthy decided that he would declare his entry to the New Hampshire primary. Hoeh and Studds took the titles of New Hampshire campaign director and coordinator, and Clark recruited the journalist Seymour Hersh to be McCarthy's press secretary.

McCarthy's surprisingly strong showing in New Hampshire led to the rapid growth of his supporters, but the campaign was in increasing disarray. When Senator Robert F. Kennedy entered the race as a second anti-war candidate, Clark and other McCarthy advisers initially tried to broker an agreement with Kennedy to meet head-to-head only in the California primary, with both campaigns supporting the winner of that primary, but McCarthy flatly rejected the proposal. Bitterness between the McCarthy and Kennedy campaigns only deepened after Johnson announced that he would not seek re-election and Hubert Humphrey emerged as the choice of the Democratic establishment. In the wake of Kennedy's assassination the night that he won the California primary, many Kennedy delegates to the 1968 Democratic National Convention refused to support McCarthy. McCarthy publicly conceded that Humphrey had enough delegates to win the nomination, a move that enraged Clark and other McCarthy supporters who felt that the candidate still had a chance of defeating Humphrey.

Clark's sister Anne Clark Martindell also attended the Democratic National Convention as a McCarthy supporter, launching her career in politics and public service. She would go on to serve in the New Jersey Senate and as United States Ambassador to New Zealand.

Clark later became treasurer of the New Democratic Coalition, a group of disaffected liberals from the 1968 campaign. When the Watergate break-in occurred, Clark was the Democratic National Committee's communications director.

== Personal life ==
In 1941, he was married to Jessie Holladay Philbin, daughter of Jesse Holliday Philbin (d. 1978) and granddaughter of Eugene A. Philbin (1857–1920), the New York County District Attorney. They had two children, Timothy B. Clark and Cameron Clark. The couple divorced in 1960.

Jessie Philbin remarried John Sumner Runnells James in 1965. In 1971, Blair married his second wife Joanna (née Rostropowicz) Malinowski (b. 1939), who was born in Warsaw, Poland and was the daughter of Wladyslaw and Helena (née Baranski) Rostropowicz. Joanna, the mother of Tomasz Malinowski (b. 1965), received a PhD from the University of Pennsylvania and is a writer. They had a son.

In 2000, Clark died at his home in Princeton, New Jersey at the age of 82.
