= Della M. Newman =

American diplomat

6th United States Ambassador to Samoa
- In office November 16, 1989 – December 21, 1992
- President: George H. W. Bush
- Preceded by: Paul Matthews Cleveland
- Succeeded by: Josiah H. Beeman V

17th United States Ambassador to New Zealand
- In office October 25, 1989 – December 21, 1992
- President: George H. W. Bush
- Preceded by: Paul Matthews Cleveland
- Succeeded by: Josiah H. Beeman V

Personal details
- Born: June 6, 1932 Seattle, Washington
- Died: July 11, 2023 (aged 91) Mount Vernon, Washington
- Party: Republican

Della M. Newman (June 6, 1932 – July 11, 2023) was an American businesswoman who served as the United States Ambassador to New Zealand and Samoa from 1989 to 1992.

Newman chaired George H.W. Bush's campaign in Washington state. At the time of her appointment, she was a realty owner and headed the Association of Washington Business, the state's main business lobbying group. Despite never having been to New Zealand, “Newman felt she was asked to fill the ambassador's post because of her party activism and because of similarities between New Zealand and the Pacific Northwest. ‘New Zealand has a similar climate, they speak English and they are on the Pacific Rim,' she said.”

Senator Paul Sarbanes criticized President Bush for his unusually high percentage of political appointees to ambassadorships. According to the Los Angeles Times:

Bush has announced 42 ambassadorial appointments, of which only 14--one-third of the total--have gone to career diplomats. Of the rest, 21 are strictly political, including several persons who had contributed more than $100,000 to Bush’s campaign coffers; the other seven are legally classified as political because they are not members of the nonpartisan Foreign Service, although they are foreign policy professionals who served in previous Republican administrations.

Newman's appointment was one of three put on hold because they “were judged to be unqualified by the American Academy of Diplomacy.” Cited was that not only was she the State Chair of his campaign, but also that her husband was a major contributor.

She died on July 11, 2023, in Mount Vernon, Washington at age 91.
