= Anne Clark Martindell =

American politician (1914–2008)

3rd United States Ambassador to Samoa
- In office September 17, 1979 – May 7, 1981
- President: Jimmy Carter; Ronald Reagan
- Preceded by: Armistead I. Selden Jr.
- Succeeded by: H. Monroe Browne

14th United States Ambassador to New Zealand
- In office August 28, 1979 – May 7, 1981
- President: Jimmy Carter; Ronald Reagan
- Preceded by: Armistead I. Selden Jr.
- Succeeded by: H. Monroe Browne

Member of the New Jersey Senate from the 14th Legislative District
- In office January 8, 1974 – May 17, 1977
- Preceded by: District created
- Succeeded by: Walter E. Foran

Personal details
- Born: Anne Clark; July 18, 1914 New York City, US
- Died: June 11, 2008 (aged 93) Princeton, New Jersey, US
- Party: Democratic
- Spouses: George C. Scott Jr. (m. 1934; div. 1947) Jackson Martindell (m. 1948; died 1990)
- Parent(s): William Clark; Marjory Bruce Blair Clark

Anne Clark Martindell (July 18, 1914 – June 11, 2008) was an American Democratic Party politician from New Jersey, as well as a diplomat who was United States Ambassador to New Zealand from 1979 to 1981.

== Early life and family ==
Anne Clark was born in New York City on July 18, 1914, to William and Marjory Bruce (née Blair) Clark, a daughter of the investment banker C. Ledyard Blair. Her younger brother was Blair Clark, a liberal journalist and activist. After her parents' divorce in 1947, her father remarried the journalist Sonia Tomara.

After attending boarding school in Maryland she enrolled at Smith College in 1932. After one year at Smith, she was forbidden from returning to campus by her father, a federal judge in Newark, who was later appointed to the United States Court of Appeals for the Third Circuit. He forced her to withdraw from the college, fearing that an educated woman would be unmarriageable.

Much later in life she returned to Smith and earned a B.A. degree in 2002, at the age of 87. Smith also honored its oldest graduate with an honorary Doctor of Laws degree.

=== Marriages ===
Following her departure from Smith she returned home to Princeton, New Jersey, and married George Cole Scott Jr., a stockbroker, in 1934. They had three children together: Marjory Scott Luther, George C. Scott III and David C. Scott. The marriage ended in divorce after 13 years.

After her divorce, she met and later married Jackson Martindell, publisher of Marquis Who's Who, the company that annually produces Who's Who in America, in 1948. Together they had a son, Roger, who was a member of the Princeton Borough Council.

== Career ==
Martindell was already in her 50s when she became active in Democratic politics. Her brother, Blair, was the national campaign director for Eugene McCarthy in the 1968 presidential campaign. She attended the 1968 Democratic National Convention in Chicago to show support for McCarthy, as well as for the New Jersey gubernatorial candidate Robert B. Meyner, a friend of the family. After the convention, Meyner asked Martindell to become vice chair of the New Jersey Democratic State Committee. At the end of her four-year appointment, local Democrats encouraged her to run for the New Jersey Senate in 1973 in a traditionally Republican district encompassing parts of Hunterdon, Mercer, Middlesex and Morris counties. She managed to beat the incumbent state senator, William E. Schluter, in a year when Republicans battled the specter of the Watergate scandal and Democrats were buoyed by the landslide victory of Brendan Byrne as Governor of New Jersey.

In her four years in the State Senate, Martindell worked primarily on women's issues, education and the environment. She was chair of the Education Committee, a member of the Appropriations Committee, chair of the Budget Revision Subcommittee for Higher Education, chair of the Joint State Library Committee, a member of the Senate Nursing Home Commission and chair of the Committee to Defeat Casino Gambling. Martindell led the successful 1974 "No Dice" campaign against legalized casino gambling. She was also an outspoken supporter of adding an Equal Rights Amendment to the New Jersey state constitution. She was a delegate for Jimmy Carter at the 1976 Democratic National Convention and was an active campaigner for Carter in New Jersey. When he was elected president, she resigned from the New Jersey Senate in 1977 to take a series of federal appointments. She was succeeded in the Senate by Walter E. Foran, then serving in the New Jersey General Assembly, who won a special election to fill the remainder of Martindell's term as well as the general election for a full four-year term.

=== Diplomatic career ===
Martindell was appointed to the Commission to Review Ambassadorial Appointments and later became director of the Office of Foreign Disaster Assistance, surveying natural disaster reconstruction efforts funded by USAID. Her work attracted the attention of the ambassadorship review board, which recommended her candidacy to Carter for the position of ambassador to New Zealand. She was nominated for the ambassadorship and held to post from 1979 to 1981, the first woman to be an ambassador to New Zealand.

Martindell signed the Treaty of Tokehega on behalf of the United States, which delimited the maritime boundary between Tokelau and American Samoa. On her return from New Zealand, she continued to foster close relations between the two countries, organizing the United States–New Zealand Council in 1986 and being the council's first president.

Martindell's memoir, Never Too Late (ISBN 9781933672502), was published in 2008. She died on June 11, 2008, at the age of 93.

New Jersey Senate
Preceded by William E. Schluter	New Jersey State Senator - District 14; January 1974 – November 1977	Succeeded by Walter E. Foran
Diplomatic posts
Preceded by Armistead I. Selden, Jr.	United States Ambassador to New Zealand; August 28, 1979 – May 7, 1981	Succeeded by H. Monroe Browne
