= Andra Akers =

American actress and philanthropist (1943–2002)

- Born: September 16, 1943; New York City, U.S.
- Died: March 20, 2002 (aged 58); Los Angeles, California, U.S.
- Occupations: Actress, philanthropist
- Relatives: Anthony B. Akers (father); John Russell Pope (grandfather); Ellery Akers (sister); William Ellery

Andra Akers (September 16, 1943 – March 20, 2002) was an American actress and philanthropist. A character actress, she appeared in films, theater and television, usually in tough or brassy roles.

== Early life and education ==
Akers was born in New York City. Her father, Anthony B. Akers, was a veteran World War II naval officer and attorney who became the United States ambassador to New Zealand during the Kennedy administration. Her mother, Jane Pope, was the daughter of the architect John Russell Pope. She was descended from William Ellery. Her sister, Ellery Akers, is a poet and naturalist based in Northern California.

== Career ==
During her time in New Zealand she attended Victoria University of Wellington and appeared in a 1962 production of Chekhov's The Seagull. She continued her studies at Sarah Lawrence College in Yonkers, New York, majoring in theater and political science.

She made her film debut in Brian de Palma's Murder a la Mod in 1968. Her acting career spanned the 1960s through to the mid-1980s, during which time she made several guest appearances in popular television series. In 1986 she retired from acting to found Synergy International, later renamed the Essence Institute, an interdisciplinary think tank involving video and electronic artists, mathematicians, computer scientists and others.

== Death ==
Akers died in Los Angeles in 2002 following complications from surgery.

== Filmography ==
=== Film ===
| Year | Title | Role | Notes |
|---|---|---|---|
| 1968 | Murder a la Mod | Tracy | |
| 1969 | The Wedding Party | Wedding Guest | |
| 1978 | Moment by Moment | Naomi | |
| 1984 | E. Nick: A Legend in His Own Mind | Aunt Mona | |
| 1985 | Desert Hearts | Silver | |
| 1986 | Just Between Friends | Andrea | |
| 1986 | Odd Jobs | Mrs. Finelli | |
| 1986 | Nothing in Common | Blonde Saleswoman | |

=== Television ===
| Year | Title | Role | Notes |
|---|---|---|---|
| 1975 | Police Woman | Linda Kamm | Episode: "Glitter with a Bullet" |
| 1976 | Visions | Kate Scofield | Episode: "Liza's Pioneer Diary" |
| 1976 | Charlie's Angels | Jessica Farmer | Episode: "Angels on Wheels" |
| 1976–1977 | Mary Hartman, Mary Hartman | Christine Addams | 21 episodes |
| 1977 | All's Fair | Desiree | Episode: "Remembrance" |
| 1977 | Rafferty | Mrs. Hollander | Episode: "Rafferty" |
| 1977 | Baretta | Doris Johnson | Episode: "Make the Sun Shine" |
| 1978 | Taxi | Rita | Episode: "Come as You Aren't" |
| 1978 | Family | Roz Cornick | Episode: "Expectations" |
| 1979 | Dallas | Sally Bullock | Episode: "Return Engagements" |
| 1979 / 1982 | Hart to Hart | Louisa Clement / Dana Blake | Episodes: "Death in the slow Lane" / "Harts and Palms" |
| 1981 | Pen 'n' Inc. | Gretchen Vanderwyck | Television film |
| 1981 | Flamingo Road | Vanessa Curtis | Episode: "The Intruder" |
| 1981 | Hardcase | Laura Tinkerbell | Television film |
| 1982 | The Dukes of Hazzard | Molly Hargrove | Episode: "Birds Gotta Fly" |
| 1982 | Voyagers! | Lizzie Palmer | Episode: "Old Hickory and the Pirate" |
| 1985 | Copacabana | Pamela Devereaux | Television film |
| 1986 | Killer in the Mirror | Stacey Courtney | Television film |
| 1986 | Moonlighting | Mrs. Kendrick | Episode: "Big Man on Mulberry Street" |
