= Niue–United States Maritime Boundary Treaty =

Treaty between the Government of the United States of America and the Government of Niue on the delimitation of a maritime boundary
- Type: Boundary delimitation
- Signed: 13 May 1997
- Location: Wellington, New Zealand
- Parties: Niue; United States
- Depositary: United Nations Secretariat
- Language: English

The Niue–United States Maritime Boundary Treaty is a 1997 treaty that delimits the maritime boundary between Niue and American Samoa.

The treaty was signed in Wellington, New Zealand on 13 May 1997 by Niuean Premier Frank Lui and United States ambassador Josiah Beeman. In the treaty, the boundary is 279 nautical miles long, runs in a rough east–west direction, and is composed of 18 straight-line maritime segments defined by reference to 19 individual coordinate points.

The treaty was submitted to the United States Senate for ratification by U.S. President Bill Clinton on 23 June 1998.

The full name of the treaty is the Treaty between the Government of the United States of America and the Government of Niue on the delimitation of a maritime boundary.
