= Kenneth Franzheim II =

American diplomat (1925–2007)

Kenneth Franzheim II (September 12, 1925 – October 29, 2007) was a Houston oilman, philanthropist, and envoy. He served under U.S. President Richard Nixon as the United States Ambassador to New Zealand, Western Samoa, Tonga and Fiji from 1969 to 1972.

Diplomatic posts
Preceded by post recreated	United States Ambassador to New Zealand; 1969-1972	Succeeded by Armistead I. Selden
Preceded by post created	United States Ambassador to Fiji; 1972	Succeeded by Armistead I. Selden
