= Wheatland hop riot =

1913 riot in Wheatland, California

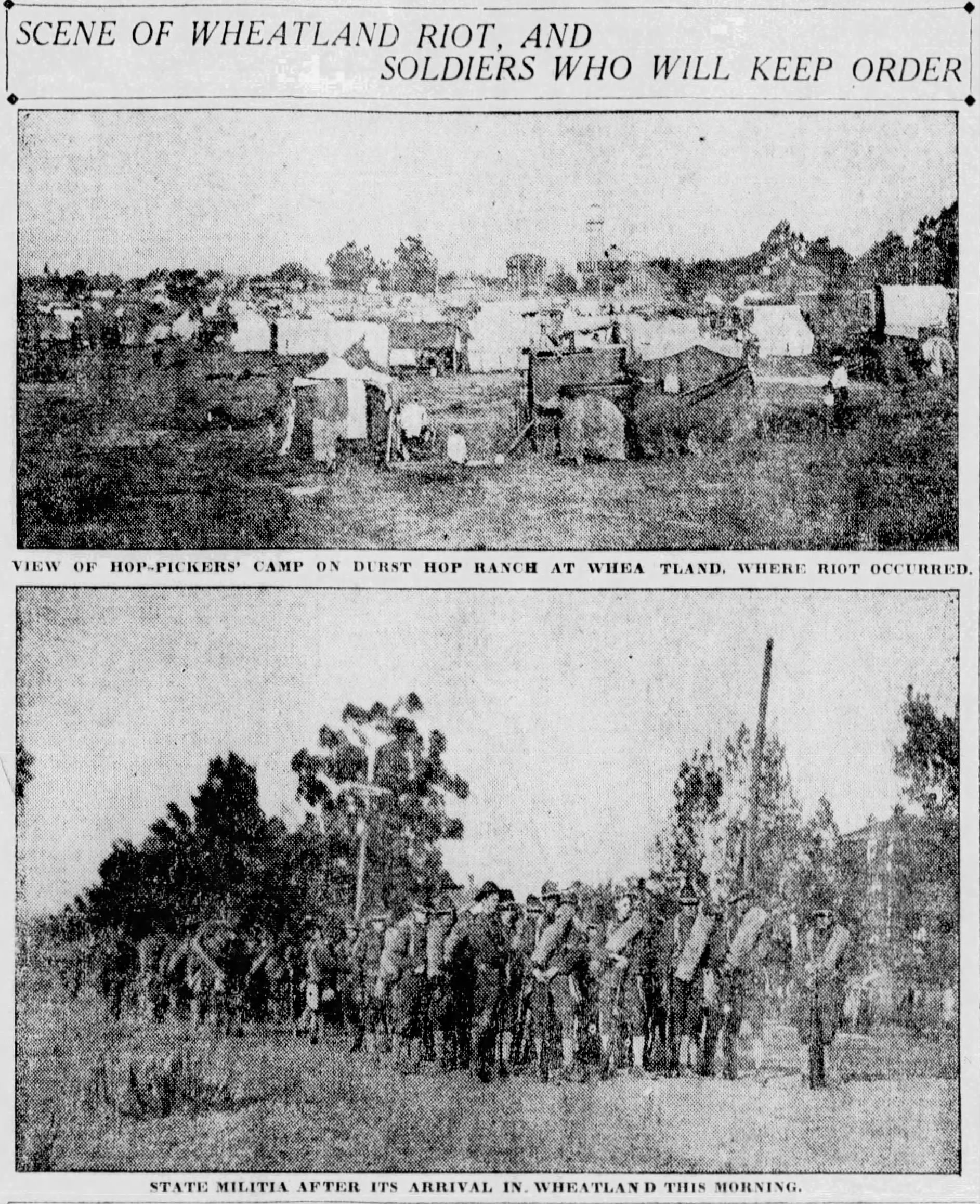
- Date: August 3, 1913
- Location: Wheatland, California
- Caused by: Poor living and working conditions; low pay

Parties
| Industrial Workers of the World | Ralph Durst; Law enforcement |

Casualties
- Deaths: 4
- Arrested: 100

The Wheatland hop riot was a violent confrontation during a strike of agricultural workers demanding decent working conditions at the Durst Ranch in Wheatland, California, on August 3, 1913. The riot, which resulted in four deaths and numerous injuries, was subsequently blamed by local authorities, who were controlled by management, upon the Industrial Workers of the World (IWW). The Wheatland hop riot was among the first major farm labor confrontations in California and a harbinger of further such battles in the United States throughout the 20th century.

== History ==
=== Background ===
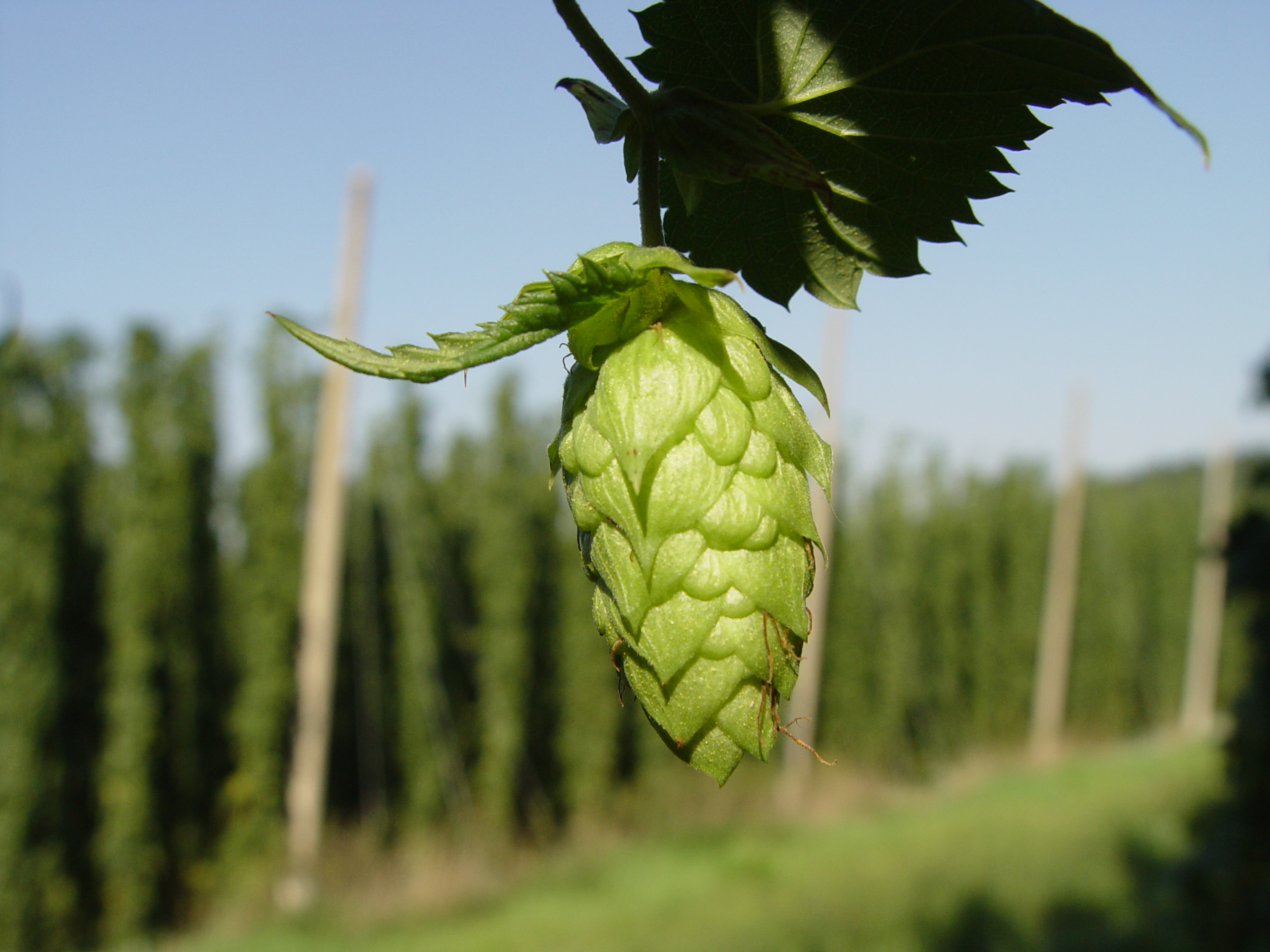
Hops plants produce a resinous flower cone which is used as a flavoring agent in beer.

Ralph H. Durst (March 28, 1865 – May 4, 1938) was a leading grower of hops in the Central Valley of California. The Durst Ranch, located on 640 acres (260 ha) outside the town of Wheatland in Yuba County, California, was the largest single employer of agricultural labor in the state, requiring each summer the hiring of hundreds of seasonal workers to help bring in the harvest. The farm also dried and packaged the picked hops on site, before transporting them by train to San Francisco for export to England.

In the summer of 1913 Durst advertised for temporary harvest workers as he had always done, promising ample work at high rates of pay. In one flier soliciting laborers, the Durst Ranch promised a job to every white hops picker who arrived on his farm by August 5.

In this year, however, the number of willing workers far outstripped demand, with some 2800 men, women, and children flocking to the Durst Ranch to work as pickers in the fields. Jobs actually existed for only about 1500 workers daily, and pay rates were consequently slashed.

In addition to the lack of employment for many of those arriving at the Durst Ranch, living conditions for the temporary field hands were particularly abysmal. Workers lived in tents in the hot summer sun on a barren hillside, paying Durst 75 cents per week for the privilege as a rental fee. More workers were on hand than could be accommodated in these tents, however, forcing some to make do in the elements under crude structures constructed from poles and burlap sacks.

Toilet facilities were grossly insufficient for such a large workforce. They were often extremely filthy, overflowing with human waste and covered with flies. Drinking water was a mile from the fields and Durst refused to supply any to the pickers under his employ, instead allowing his cousin to operate a commercial lemonade wagon. Furthermore, the lemonade was an inferior synthetic brew, sold for five cents a glass.

Wages were to be paid based on the weight of hops picked, with pickers promised a pay rate of $1 per 100 pounds harvested. This rate was deceptive in that the picked hops were heavily cleaned before final weighing, with no pickers allowed to be present to verify the work of the cleaning crew. Workers generally received less than $1.50 per day for twelve hours of toil under a summer sun that could reach 110 °F (43 °C). Workers on other farms in the area typically netted twice as much.

Further stoking worker unrest, Durst maintained a policy of retaining 10% of the daily wage owed each worker until the end of harvest, to be received only by those who remained at the Durst Ranch to the end. Workers would in this way be obligated to stay at the farm to the end of harvest or face forfeiture of a substantial portion of their earnings.

=== Strike ===
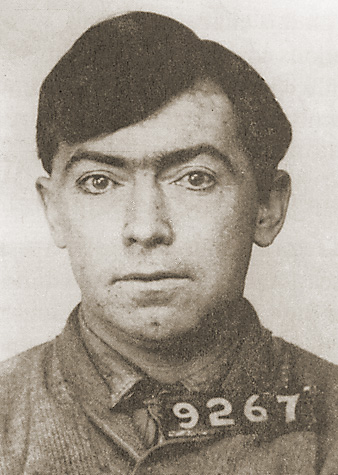
Richard "Blackie" Ford, spokesman for striking field workers at the time of the Wheatland hop riot

Harvest of hops began on the Durst Ranch on July 29, 1913. Discontent over pay and conditions immediately erupted among the migrant workers as the actual terms of their employment and living conditions became clear.

On Friday, August 1, 1913, a group of about thirty field workers loosely affiliated with the Industrial Workers of the World union (members of which were known as "Wobblies") established themselves as a temporary local of that organization and began to agitate among their peers to take action about the dire conditions which they faced. A former Wobbly, Richard "Blackie" Ford, was chosen to be the spokesman for the field workers' demands, which included a pay rate of $1.25 per 100 picked pounds, a new system in which workers cleaned their own picked hops, drinking water to be provided in the fields, improvement of toilet facilities and separate bathrooms for women, and the hiring of assistants to help women and children with the loading of heavy hop sacks into wagons.

Durst partially complied, indicating that he would henceforth improve toilet facilities, provide water in the fields, and allow one worker to witness the cleaning process. Ford responded by threatening a strike if the other demands were not met. Durst immediately terminated Ford and the others on the strike committee who accompanied him. However, Ford and the strike committee refused to collect their pay and exit the ranch, prompting Durst to call Deputy Sheriff Henry Daken and ask him to arrest the strike leader. No arrests were made owing to the lack of an arrest warrant.

The tense situation began to boil over. A mass meeting was called, which was addressed by Ford and Herman Suhr, an IWW member who was acting as secretary of the temporary Durst Farm local. Other speakers addressed the crowd in the German, Greek, Italian, Arabic, and Spanish languages. A show of hands indicated that a large majority of pickers at the meeting were in favor of a strike. The crowd remained peaceful and sang Wobbly songs through the afternoon.

Additional small meetings were held among the pickers on Saturday, August 2.

=== Events of August 3, 1913 ===
With a major strike of hop pickers in the offing, Ralph Durst headed to town to round up local authorities to put down the revolt. He gathered Yuba County District Attorney Edward Manwell (who was also his own lawyer), Marysville Sheriff George Voss, and a number of deputies. The sheriff and his men approached the speakers' platform to arrest Ford, who was addressing the assembly. Workers began to intervene on his behalf. Greatly outnumbered, one of the law enforcement officials fired a shotgun into the air in an effort to disperse the crowd. The shot provoked the opposite effect intended and many members of the crowd jumped on District Attorney Manwell and Deputy Sheriff Lee Anderson and began beating them.

Gunfire erupted and a full-fledged riot ensued. In the aftermath the 45-year-old Manwell, Deputy Sheriff Eugene Reardon, a Puerto Rican hop picker, and an English hop picker lay dead. One picker lost an arm to a shotgun blast.

Eyewitness accounts of the incident were contradictory. In the best estimation of historian Greg Hall:

The crowd...was unarmed. By most accounts, the deaths of Manwell and Reardon resulted from Reardon and perhaps another member of the posse having their guns taken away and used against them.

Another historian of the Wheatland events indicates that the district attorney and the deputy were killed by the Puerto Rican worker, who had successfully disarmed a lawman and used his firearm against them, only to be killed himself by a member of the posse. The English picker who was killed is said to have been an innocent bystander in this alternative account.

In the aftermath of the violence many hop workers immediately vacated the Durst Ranch, scattering in every direction. Meanwhile, Wheatland and Marysville authorities immediately contacted Governor Hiram Johnson requesting rapid dispatch of units of the National Guard to maintain order. Local law enforcement authorities themselves rushed into action, making about 100 arrests of seasonal agricultural workers.

Those arrested were subjected to starvation and physical beating in an effort to gain testimony to be used against strike leaders. One such prisoner, a field worker named Alfred Nelson, was hauled from county to county where he was held incommunicado, sweated, starved, beaten, and repeatedly threatened with death unless he confessed to participation in the killings. In Martinez, Nelson was taken from jail to a room in a hotel where he was beaten by a sheriff and a private detective with pistol butts and a rubber hose and threatened with summary execution. Nelson refused to confess and was eventually returned to jail. The treatment of Nelson shocked Martinez District Attorney A.B. McKenzie, who declared Nelson's treatment to have been "one of the biggest outrages that has ever been perpetuated in this state." The Swedish consulate in San Francisco lodged a formal protest on behalf of Nelson, a Swedish national.

A coroner's inquest was conducted which concluded that the IWW strike leadership had caused the riot which led to the death of District Attorney Manwell. Arrest warrants were hastily issued for Ford and Suhr on charges of murder. The pair were soon detained, as were their fellow workers Walter Bagan and William Beck, all of whom were held over for trial. The psychological pressure was so severe that Nels Nelson, the picker who lost his arm to a gunshot wound, hanged himself to death in his cell. Another prisoner unsuccessfully attempted to do the same. A third prisoner suffered a breakdown and had to be committed to a mental hospital.

=== Trial ===
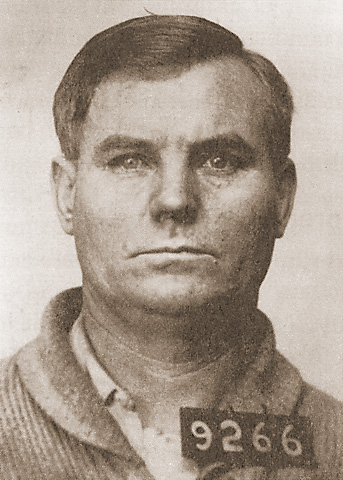
Herman D. Suhr, secretary of the Durst Farm local of the Industrial Workers of the World and a leader of the ill-fated August 1913 strike.

The defense of the IWW defendants was conducted by Socialist attorney Austin Lewis, a friend of the organization. Two legal defense funds were established to raise funds for the trial — the Wheatland Hop Picker's Defense League, launched by the IWW itself, and the International Workers' Defense League, which was a coalition effort. By the middle of February 1914 the groups had raised a combined $5,575 to aid the defense effort.

Newspapers around the state tarred the IWW defendants as fanatics committed to violence and local sentiment was overwhelmingly hostile. One local newspaper, the Marysville Democrat, denounced the Wobblies as "venomous human snakes" who "always urged armed resistance to constituted authority" and were thus "more dangerous and deadly than the wild animals of the jungles".

The trial opened in neighboring Marysville. Attorney Lewis attempted to obtain a change of venue so that the defendants might be tried in a more neutral setting than the superheated environment of Yuba County. In addition to pervasive bias against the IWW in the local community, Lewis noted that the judge in the case, E.P. McDaniel, was a personal friend of the dead district attorney. The request for the change of venue was denied and Governor Johnson likewise declined to appoint a new judge in the case.

Eight of the twelve members of the jury for the trial of the agricultural strike organizers were farmers. Testimony for the prosecution emphasized the fact that Ford and Suhr were "agitators". No witness indicated that they had seen Ford with a gun; rather the case was made that by mobilizing the hop pickers the IWW organizer had "filled the magazines of wrath." Suhr's so-called "confession" was not introduced into evidence, indicative that it had been obtained through the use of illegal force, but three deputies were put on the stand to testify that Suhr had told them he had taken a gun from an old man while fleeing the scene and fired twice. This accusation was denied by Suhr. No eyewitness evidence was produced to indicate that Suhr had actually fired the fatal shots.

Defense witnesses indicated that the shots which killed the law enforcement officials were fired by the dead Puerto Rican picker from Deputy Reardon's gun, which had been seized in the scuffle. Attorney Lewis emphasized in his closing that

None of the defendants took part in the shooting. None was seen with a gun in his hands. None advised or abetted violence. Nothing in the evidence points to a conspiracy — much less proves it.

Despite Lewis's best efforts, the result of the trial was never really in doubt. On January 13, 1914 Blackie Ford and Herman Suhr, the recognized leaders of the strike which had degenerated into a fatal riot, were found guilty of second-degree murder after one day of jury deliberations. Both received life sentences in the state penitentiary. Walter Bagan and William Beck, owing to their lesser role in the strike and no evidence tying them to the violence which resulted, were acquitted.

=== Legacy ===
Despite the convictions of Ford and Suhr, the stature of the IWW grew among the migrant workers of California following the Wheatland Hop Riot and that organization emerged as a primary representative of farm workers in the state. The number of Wobblies in California rose to 5,000 by the end of 1914, with forty locals of the organization dotting the state.

The Wheatland hop riot of 1913 focused public opinion for the first time on the plight of California's agricultural laborers. California's progressive Republican governor Hiram Johnson empowered a new Commission on Immigration and Housing to investigate the underlying causes behind the Wheatland Riot, which resulted in new legislation providing for the state inspection of labor camps.

The California State investigation attracted federal attention and in August 1914 the US Commission on Industrial Relations conducted hearings on the Wheatland Hop Riot in San Francisco. Testimony gathered further exposed the conditions faced by California agricultural workers in general and those on the Durst Ranch in particular, as well as the systemic violence practiced by private detectives working in cooperation with Yuba County law enforcement authorities.

Appeals to the California Supreme Court on their behalf were unsuccessful and the two convicted leaders of the Wheatland strike remained behind bars for over a decade. Blackie Ford was eventually paroled in 1924 only to be immediately re-arrested and charged for murder by the Yuba City District Attorney, this time for the death of sheriff's deputy Reardon. A trial was held, after which the jury deliberated for 77 hours before returning a verdict of acquittal. Herman Suhr was pardoned not long after.

Today, the site of the Wheatland hop riot is registered as California Historical Landmark #1003.

== See also ==
- California agricultural strikes of 1933
- 1933 Yakima Valley hop strike
- Salad Bowl strike
- List of worker deaths in United States labor disputes
- List of incidents of civil unrest in the United States
