= Anthony B. Akers =

American diplomat

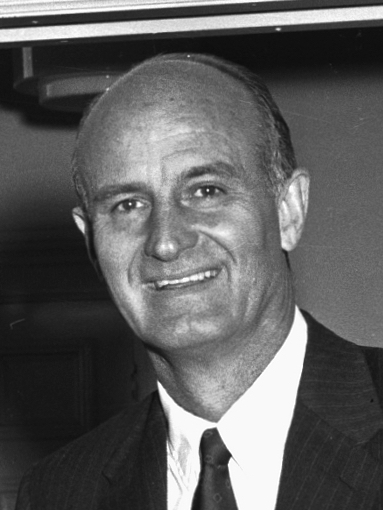

9th United States Ambassador to New Zealand
- In office July 18, 1961 – August 25, 1963
- President: John F. Kennedy
- Preceded by: Francis H. Russell
- Succeeded by: Herbert B. Powell

Personal details
- Born: October 19, 1914 Charlotte, Texas, U.S.
- Died: April 1, 1976 (aged 61) Wrightsville Beach, North Carolina, U.S.
- Party: Democratic
- Children: Andra Akers; Ellery Akers
- Education: Columbia University (LLB)

Military service
- Branch/service: United States Navy
- Battles/wars: World War II; Pacific War

Anthony Boyce Akers (October 19, 1914 – April 1, 1976) was an American attorney, diplomat, and political candidate who served as the United States Ambassador to New Zealand from 1961 to 1963.

== Early life and education ==
Akers was born in Charlotte, Texas, and attended the University of Texas at Austin. He later graduated from Columbia Law School.

== Career ==
Enlisting in the United States Navy in 1940, he served in the Pacific War as lieutenant commander of a PT boat, and was awarded a Silver Star and two Presidential citations. He was one of four officers who became the fictionalized heroes of William L. White's 1942 novel They Were Expendable, based on his Squadron 3's evacuation of General Douglas MacArthur and President Manuel Quezon from Corregidor to Australia. When John Ford filmed the story, Akers served as a technical advisor.

During the Korean War, Akers served as Deputy Assistant Secretary and Deputy United States Under Secretary of the Air Force. He was director of the New York City office of the State Department of Commerce until 1958. He ran unsuccessfully for Congress as a Democrat in the East Side 17th District three times: in 1954, 1956 and 1958.

Akers had first met John F. Kennedy in World War II. Akers ran the motor torpedo boat training squadron in Melville, Rhode Island where Kennedy trained. Kennedy campaigned for Akers in the latter's 1956 bid for Congress, and Akers served as executive chairman of the NY Citizens' Committee for Kennedy–Johnson in 1960. After winning the presidency, Kennedy appointed Akers Ambassador to New Zealand in June 1961, where he represented the United States until August 25, 1963. During his time in New Zealand, he lobbied the ANZUS to send advisory personnel to Vietnam. Akers returned to the United States, intending to take over the job of Chief of Protocol from Angier Biddle Duke. After the President's assassination, Akers returned to practicing law. He later worked as an advisor on the Robert F. Kennedy 1968 presidential campaign, and was present at the Ambassador Hotel when Kennedy was assassinated.

== Personal life ==
Akers was married to Jane Pope, the daughter of architect John Russell Pope. Akers and his wife had two daughters: Andra Akers, an actress, and Ellery Akers, a poet and naturalist.

Akers died of a heart attack on April 1, 1976, in Wrightsville Beach, North Carolina, aged 61.
