= Walter Flowers =

American Democratic politician

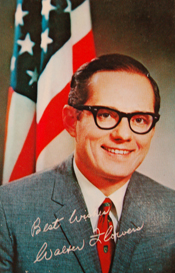

Member of the U.S. House of Representatives from Alabama
- In office January 3, 1969 – January 3, 1979
- Preceded by: Armistead I. Selden, Jr. (5th); Tom Bevill (7th)
- Succeeded by: Robert E. Jones Jr. (5th); Richard Shelby (7th)
- Constituency: 5th district (1969–1973); 7th district (1973–1979)

Personal details
- Born: April 12, 1933 Greenville, Alabama
- Died: April 12, 1984 (aged 51) McLean, Virginia
- Resting place: Arlington National Cemetery
- Party: Democratic
- Education: University of Alabama

Walter Winkler Flowers, Jr. (April 12, 1933 – April 12, 1984) was an American Democratic politician who represented Alabama's 5th congressional district and Alabama's 7th congressional district in the United States House of Representatives from January 1969 to January 1979.

== Private life ==
A native of Greenville, Alabama in Butler County, Walter Flowers attended public schools in Tuscaloosa and entered the University of Alabama where he earned degrees in 1955 and 1957. In 1957–1958, Flowers continued his graduate studies in international law as a fellow at the University of London. He held a commission as a Reserve Lieutenant Officer in the US Army in Military Intelligence and practiced law in Alabama before his election to the United States Congress. At the time of his death, from a heart attack while playing tennis, he lived in McLean, Virginia.

== Political career ==
On November 5, 1968, Walter Flowers was elected to the first of five successive terms in the U.S. House of Representatives. In 1978 he sought the Democratic nomination for the United States Senate, but lost the primary to Howell Heflin who went on to serve three terms. Flowers did not seek political office again but retired from politics to McLean, Virginia, where he died on his fifty-first birthday. Burial was at Arlington National Cemetery.

=== Role in Watergate hearings ===
Flowers served on the House Judiciary Committee which voted to refer articles of impeachment against President Richard M. Nixon to the full House of Representatives in 1974. Flowers, a conservative Democrat, was considered to be leaning against the impeachment vote. After a long struggle, Flowers voted for impeachment. The congressman said "I felt that if we didn't impeach, we'd just ingrain and stamp in our highest office a standard of conduct that's just unacceptable." Coming from a state which had supported Nixon in 1972, he was seen as influential even with some Republicans. He told the undecided Republicans on the committee, "This is something we just cannot walk away from. It happened, and now we've got to deal with it.

=== George Wallace ===
Flowers was influenced by former Alabama Governor George C. Wallace during his political career. Wallace said that during the Watergate hearings he tried to shield Flowers from increased pressure by refusing to forward a request, from Nixon, that he vote against impeachment. Flowers campaigned for Wallace and served as his national campaign chairman during Wallace's 1972 run for president.

U.S. House of Representatives
Preceded by Armistead I. Selden, Jr.	Member of the U.S. House of Representatives from Alabama's 5th congressional district 1969–1973	Succeeded by Robert E. Jones, Jr.
Preceded by Tom Bevill	Member of the U.S. House of Representatives from Alabama's 7th congressional district 1973–1979	Succeeded by Richard Shelby
