= 1933 Yakima Valley strike =

Labor action in Washington state, US

- Date: 24 August 1933
- Location: Yakima Valley, Washington, United States
- Goals: End of child labor, the eight-hour day, wage increases
- Methods: Strike, picketing
- Result: Defeat of strike, public assemblies banned, transient workers expelled

Parties
Industrial Workers of the World	Yakima County Sheriff's Department, Washington State Patrol, Washington National Guard, vigilantes

Number
100+ picketers	22 Yakima County Sheriff's deputies, 250+ vigilantes

Casualties
- Injuries: Some picketers
- Arrested: 61 picketers

The 1933 Yakima Valley strike (also known as the Congdon Orchards Battle) took place on 24 August 1933 in the Yakima Valley, Washington, United States. It is notable as the most serious and highly publicized agricultural labor disturbance in Washington history and as a brief revitalization of the Industrial Workers of the World in the region.

== Background ==
Yakima IWW Offices c.1928

Since 1916, the Yakima Valley had felt the presence of the Industrial Workers of the World (IWW, or Wobblies), which positioned itself in conflict with local authorities and business interests. The meeting hall opened by the IWW in Yakima during the fall of that year was promptly raided by local police, who arrested its inhabitants, closed the building, and denied Wobblies the right to hold the street meetings which they regarded as essential to their organizational effort among the harvest workers flooding into the valley.

The Yakima strikes began with hop pickers in the Yakima Valley. The demands of the hop pickers were not of anything uncommon during the 1930s, with striking for regular eight-hour work days, the end of child labor in the yards, and a minimum wage of 35 cents per hour for men and women alike. At the time, the current rate for common labor was 10 to 12 cents an hour, with hop farmers claiming that they could not pay any more than 12 ½ cents per hour for labor due to lack of profit they made in sales.

In 1932, Yakima Valley hops sold for 11 to 14 cents a pound. Then, effective 7 April 1933, Congress legalized 3.2 percent beer and wine. States rapidly moved to repeal the Eighteenth Amendment. The effect of these events on hop prices was dramatic: in April and May, Valley papers reported sales of the remaining uncommitted 1932 crops at 40 to 50 cents; the Yakima Morning Herald for nearly a month showed prices up to 75 cents per pound. The forthcoming crop for 1933 commanded 20 to 30 cents. Three- and four-year contracts were being signed for 18 to 25 cents.

On the second day of the strike, the Yakima County Sheriff called the Washington State Patrol to send aid in which resulted in twenty-two officers coming to the aid of the Yakima County Sheriff's office by the next morning. Although eight picketers were arrested, it did not discourage picketers from continuing their activities. The IWW attorney had contacted the hop growers to see if he could bring about a peaceful settlement to the strike, but the hop growers never responded to the attorney. The strike had fizzled out with little success when matched against the hop growers, sheriffs, and state patrolmen, especially with the Yakima Chamber of Commerce giving the law enforcement and business owners' their support.

In order to ensure that peace was maintained on the hop farms, Chief Criminal Deputy H.T. "Army" Armstrong persuaded local growers to enforce a "night hop patrol" in which at least six men would be on patrol at all times during the harvest in order to protect the fields from sabotage.

== Timeline ==
The Yakima Valley was an important hops and apple district; many men would travel to the valley during the summer seeking work. After the men were laid off due to being transient workers, they became provoked to strike in regards to the lack of work offered, in which farmers responded by creating vigilante bands around the orchards.

On August 14, several dozen men assembled at the Sunnyside Canal Bridge near the lower valley community of Sawyer. Some entered the orchard of Anna Mitchell where they talked to peach pickers about wages. While some protestors were reaching out to the pickers working at the orchard farms, others held their position on the bridge to try to dissuade the pickers from crossing the bridge to work for the farmers on the north side of the canal. With word spreading quickly of the protestors at the bridge, farmers gathered in order to out-number the strikers. Both sides had armed themselves with homemade clubs or tree limbs. The protest turned physical when protestors refused to remove themselves from the bridge. Farmers banded together to throw protestors over the bridge in to the canal to "cool them off" in order to calm down the protestors. Seeing as the farmers were well-organized and prepared for strikes, along with having the county sheriffs and state patrolmen coming to their aid, the protests of 15 and 16 August were a complete failure.

The IWW and the pickers reached the peak of their strike on 23 August 1933 when several hundred workers gathered in Selah, elected a strike committee of seven members, and demanded an eight-hour day plus 50 cents an hour. They also voted for a strike at eleven o'clock the next day. In the early morning hours of August 24, about twenty picketers gathered at the Selah ranch and sixty at another, but local farmers and sheriffs patrolled the area in order to keep the pear harvest in operation. At about 11:00 am, a group of sixty to one hundred picketers gathered at the large Congdon Orchards ranch, three miles west of Yakima, where pears were being picked. The men carried signs which advocated striking and discouraged "scabbing." Two sheriff deputies were called, and they told the pickets to move on. The picketers left the orchard, some to continue to picketing along the road and others to gather at the grassy and tree-shaded triangle of land in the middle of the intersection of what is today Nob Hill and 64th avenues. Farmers within a ten-mile radius started calling other farmers to let them know about the picketing that had taken place and to rally up farmers to resist the pickers. The farmers began to walk the picketers still hanging around the orchards towards the town, specifically "The Triangle". Once the picketers were in that area, the farmers insisted that Triangle was private property and demanded that the workers immediately vacate it. The strikers complied, moving on to the highway. Yet, as soon as they did so, the farmers voiced an object to their being congregated on public property. Although it is not clear who struck the first blows, apparently several farmers stepped forward and told the picketers to move out of the area. There was a brief discussion, then violence broke out. Men went down almost immediately. The bloody altercation involved 250 vigilantes and 100 picketers; of those 100 picketers, 61 workers were taken to the county jail.

== Aftermath ==
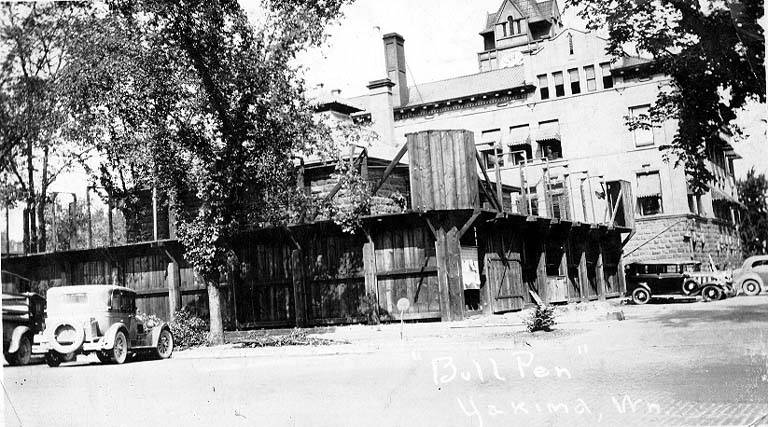
Bullpen used to imprison striking farmworkers

The strike was broken up on the night of August 24 due to the Washington National Guard breaking up a protest meeting with tear gas. As well, public assemblies were banned and highways and trains were searched for transients. National Guardsmen destroyed all the transient camps and hobo jungles in the vicinity. A public stockade of heavy timbers and barbed wire was erected to hold the prisoners awaiting trial. On two occasions, local vigilante committees seized prisoners as they were released, took them miles into the country, and beat them; once, the vigilantes tarred and feathered their victims and put linoleum cement in their shoes before freeing them.

The prisoners were charged with criminal syndicalism, later changed to vagrancy. At the trial on December 17, 1933, twelve men eventually pleaded guilty to vagrancy and agreed not to take civil action against the county, while non-resident Wobblies promised to leave the county for at least one year; in return, Yakima authorities dropped all other charges. The Yakima repression "utterly smashed" the strike and agricultural unionism in the Valley, but the wooden stockade remained on the county courthouse grounds until 1943 as a "silent reminder to future malcontents that the spirit of 1933 remained alive in the region".

== See also ==
- Wheatland hop riot: 1913 labor dispute in California
