= Armistead Selden =

American politician (1921–1985)

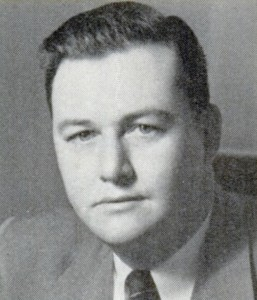

Member of the U.S. House of Representatives from Alabama
- In office January 3, 1953 – January 3, 1969
- Preceded by: Edward deGraffenried
- Succeeded by: Walter Flowers
- Constituency: 6th district (1953–63); At-large (1963–65); 5th district (1965–69)

Member of the Alabama House of Representatives
- In office 1951-1952

United States Ambassador to Fiji
- In office March 1, 1974 – April 17, 1978
- President: Richard Nixon; Gerald Ford; Jimmy Carter
- Preceded by: Kenneth Franzheim II
- Succeeded by: John P. Condon

United States Ambassador to New Zealand
- In office April 22, 1974 – April 23, 1979
- President: Gerald Ford; Jimmy Carter
- Preceded by: Kenneth Franzheim II
- Succeeded by: Anne Clark Martindell

United States Ambassador to Samoa
- In office April 22, 1974 – April 23, 1979
- President: Gerald Ford; Jimmy Carter
- Preceded by: Kenneth Franzheim II
- Succeeded by: Anne Clark Martindell

Personal details
- Born: Armistead Inge Selden, Jr. February 20, 1921 Greensboro, Alabama
- Died: November 14, 1985 (aged 64) Birmingham, Alabama
- Party: Republican (1979–1985)
- Other political affiliations: Democratic (before 1979)

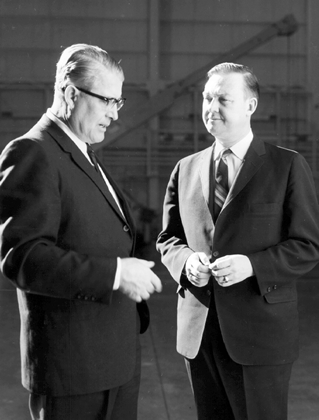
Armistead I. Selden (right) with Wernher von Braun, 1968.

Armistead Inge Selden Jr. (February 20, 1921 – November 14, 1985) was a segregationist U.S. Representative from Alabama. Originally a Democrat, he switched parties in 1979 to become a Republican.

== Early life and military service ==
Born in Greensboro, Alabama, Selden attended the public schools. He graduated from Greensboro High School in 1938 and from the University of the South, Sewanee, Tennessee, in 1942. He served in the United States Navy from August 1942 until March 1946, with 31 months aboard ship, primarily in the North Atlantic, and was discharged as a lieutenant. He served as lieutenant commander in the United States Naval Reserve. He entered the University of Alabama School of Law and graduated in 1948.

He was admitted to the bar in 1948 and commenced practice in Greensboro, Alabama. He served as member of the Alabama House of Representatives in 1951 and 1952.

== Congressional and diplomatic career ==
Selden was elected as a Democrat to the Eighty-third Congress. He was reelected to the seven succeeding Congresses (January 3, 1953 – January 3, 1969). While in Congress he was a signatory to the 1956 Southern Manifesto that opposed the desegregation of public schools ordered by the Supreme Court in Brown v. Board of Education. Selden voted against the Civil Rights Acts of 1957, the Civil Rights Acts of 1960, the Civil Rights Acts of 1964, and the Civil Rights Acts of 1968 as well as the 24th Amendment to the U.S. Constitution and the Voting Rights Act of 1965.

Selden served as a member of the United States House Committee on Foreign Affairs and as head of the now-defunct US House Inter-American Affairs Committee. Following the Cuban Revolution in 1958, led by Fidel Castro, Selden was influential in the passage of the October 19, 1960, United States embargo against Cuba and their expulsion from the Organization of American States on January 31, 1962. He also represented the US at the inauguration of Anastasio Somoza in 1967. He was not a candidate in 1968 for reelection to the United States House of Representatives but was an unsuccessful candidate for nomination to the United States Senate, losing the Democratic primary to former Lieutenant Governor James Allen. He resumed the practice of law until October 1970.

He served as Principal Deputy Assistant Secretary of Defense (International Security Affairs), October 1970 – February 1973, and as U.S. Ambassador to New Zealand, Fiji, The Kingdom of Tonga, and Western Samoa from 1974 to 1979. He was an unsuccessful Republican candidate for nomination in the United States Senate election in Alabama, 1980. He served as president of the American League for Exports and Security Assistance from 1980 to 1985. He was a resident of Greensboro, Alabama, and Falls Church, Virginia, until he died of cancer in Birmingham, Alabama, November 14, 1985. He was interred in Greensboro City Cemetery, Greensboro, Alabama.

A.I. Selden Dam, built in 1958 on Alabama's Black Warrior River, bears his name.

U.S. House of Representatives
Preceded by Edward deGraffenried	Member of the U.S. House of Representatives from Alabama's 6th congressional district 1953-1963	Succeeded by District inactive
Preceded by District inactive	Member of the U.S. House of Representatives from Alabama's at-large congressional district 1963-1965	Succeeded by District inactive
Preceded by District inactive	Member of the U.S. House of Representatives from Alabama's 5th congressional district 1965-1969	Succeeded by Walter Flowers
Diplomatic posts
Preceded by Kenneth Franzheim II	United States Ambassador to Fiji; 1974–1978	Succeeded by John Peter Condon
Preceded by Kenneth Franzheim II	U.S. Ambassador to New Zealand; 1974 – 1979	Succeeded by Anne Clark Martindell
