= H. Monroe Browne =

American diplomat

4th United States Ambassador to Samoa
- In office September 18, 1981 – November 1, 1985
- President: Ronald Reagan
- Preceded by: Anne Clark Martindell
- Succeeded by: Paul Matthews Cleveland

15th United States Ambassador to New Zealand
- In office August 11, 1981 – November 1, 1985
- President: Ronald Reagan
- Preceded by: Anne Clark Martindell
- Succeeded by: Paul Matthews Cleveland

Personal details
- Born: May 9, 1917 Long Beach, California
- Died: June 13, 2006 (aged 89) Wheatland, California
- Party: Republican

H. Monroe Browne (May 9, 1917 – June 13, 2006) was an American businessman who served as the United States Ambassador to New Zealand and Samoa from 1981 to 1985.

He died of a heart attack on June 13, 2006, in Wheatland, California, at age 89.
