= John Wolf (diplomat) =

American diplomat

John Stern Wolf
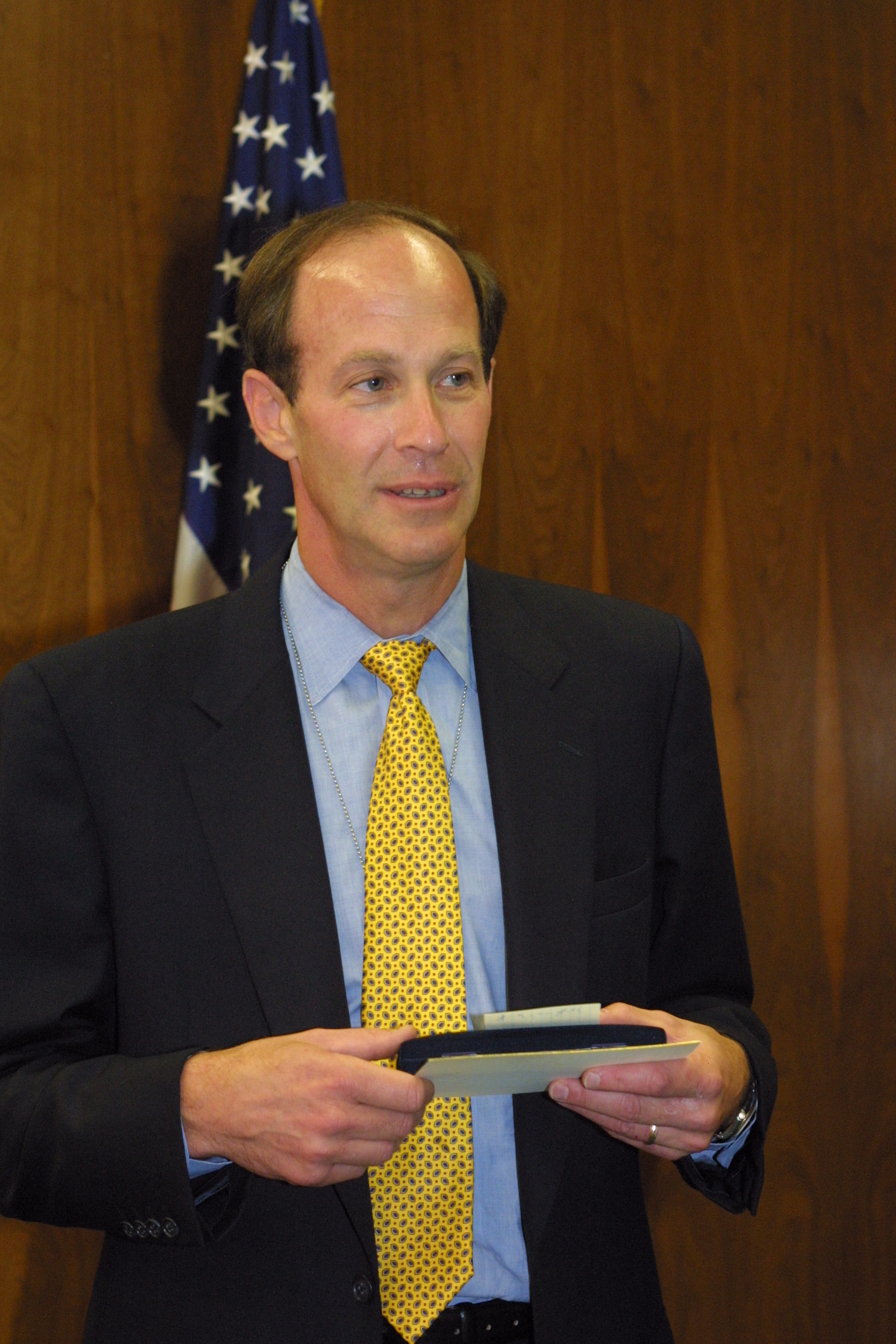

12th United States Ambassador to Malaysia
- In office October 7, 1992 – June 10, 1995
- President: George H. W. Bush; Bill Clinton
- Preceded by: Paul Matthews Cleveland
- Succeeded by: John R. Malott

Personal details
- Born: 1948 (age 77–78) Philadelphia, Pennsylvania, U.S.
- Occupation: Foreign Service officer, diplomat

John Stern Wolf (born 1948) served as a Foreign Service Officer with the Department of State from 1970–2004, including tours as the twelfth Ambassador to Malaysia, Assistant Secretary for Nonproliferation, and Chief Monitor, The Middle East Roadmap for Peace. He retired in July 2014 as President of Eisenhower Fellowships in Philadelphia, Pennsylvania.

== Career ==
=== Department of State ===
Wolf served with the Department of State, entering as a Foreign Service Officer in 1970. He became Assistant Secretary for Nonproliferation on September 26, 2001. Concurrently, in June 2003, President George W. Bush appointed him as Chief, U.S. Coordination and Monitoring Mission for the Roadmap for Peace in the Middle East. Prior to these appointments, Wolf served from 1999–2000 as Special Adviser to the President and Secretary of State for Caspian Basin Energy Diplomacy.

Following early assignments in Australia, Vietnam, Greece, and Pakistan, as well as in Washington, Wolf served as Principal Deputy Assistant Secretary of State for International Organization Affairs from 1989–1992, and Ambassador to Malaysia from 1992–1995. He was designated as Asia-Pacific Economic Cooperation (APEC) Coordinator in January 1996, and confirmed as Ambassador to APEC in February 1997.

Wolf won the President's Meritorious Service Award in 1992 and 2000, the State Department's Charles E. Cobb, Jr. Award for Initiative and Success in Trade Development in 1993 and, in 2004, the Secretary of State's Award for Distinguished Service. In 1996, he received the annual APCAC Award from the Asia Pacific Council of American Chambers of Commerce.

=== After the State Department ===
Wolf was president of Eisenhower Fellowships from August 2004 to July 2014. Eisenhower Fellowships challenges leaders around the world to think beyond their current scope, to engage others, including outside of their current networks, and to leverage their own talents to better the world around them. It is a non-partisan, non-profit organization created in 1953 to honor President Dwight D. Eisenhower.

He was elected to the Board of the American Academy of Diplomacy in 2011.

In 2020, Wolf, along with over 130 other former Republican national security officials, signed a statement that asserted that President Trump was unfit to serve another term, and "To that end, we are firmly convinced that it is in the best interest of our nation that Vice President Joe Biden be elected as the next President of the United States, and we will vote for him."

== Personal life ==
Wolf was born in Philadelphia, Pennsylvania. He is a graduate of Dartmouth College and a mid-career fellow at the Woodrow Wilson School at Princeton University. He is married and has two children.

Diplomatic posts
Preceded by Paul Matthews Cleveland	United States Ambassador to Malaysia; 1992–1995	Succeeded by John R. Malott
