= Jared Novelly =

American businessman and diplomat

- Official portrait, 2026

United States Ambassador to Samoa
- Incumbent
- Assumed office July 28, 2026
- President: Donald Trump
- Preceded by: Tom Udall

United States Ambassador to New Zealand
- Incumbent
- Assumed office July 1, 2026
- President: Donald Trump
- Preceded by: Tom Udall

Personal details
- Born: Jared J. Novelly; 1974 or 1975 (age 51–52) St Louis, Missouri, U.S.
- Party: Republican
- Education: University of Technology Sydney (MPD); Saint Louis University (BA)

Jared J. Novelly (born 1974 or 1975) is an American businessman and diplomat who has served as the United States ambassador to New Zealand and Samoa since 2026. Novelly is the chairman of the Illawarra Hawks, an Australian basketball team he purchased in 2020 through his investment firm Crest Sports and Entertainment.

== Early life and education ==
Jared J. Novelly was born in St Louis, Missouri, in 1974 or 1975, the son of billionaire oil mogul Paul Novelly. After attending Christian Brothers College High School, Novelly attained a Bachelor of Arts from Saint Louis University and a Masters of Property Development from the University of Technology Sydney.

== Career ==
Novelly first worked at a Blockbuster store before being employed by telecommunications company AT&T. While living in Missouri, Novelly also operated a real estate agency. He later served as a director of his family's company, the Apex Oil Corporation.

In 2004, Novelly sought to represent the 73rd district in the Missouri House of Representatives. After winning the Republican nomination unopposed, Novelly lost to incumbent Democratic representative Margaret Donnelly by nearly 38 points.

Novelly runs Crest Sports and Entertainment, a group with significant sporting-related investments in Asia and Australia. Novelly's company bought the Illawarra Hawks, an Australian basketball team, in 2020.

=== U.S. ambassador to New Zealand and Samoa ===
On January 24, 2025, Donald Trump announced he would nominate Novelly to serve as United States ambassador to New Zealand and Samoa. He was confirmed by the United States Senate on May 18, 2026, in a 46–43 vote.

On July 1, 2026, Novelly assumed office as United States ambassador to New Zealand; on July 28, he visited Samoa to present his diplomatic credentials, formally making him the United States ambassador to Samoa.

On November 17, 2026, Novelly rebuked Mayor of Auckland Wayne Brown for remarks that he made during a recent interview criticising Western-style democracy in the United States and New Zealand, and praising Chinese-style governance. Novelly also described Brown's remarks that New Zealand should sell its Five Eyes seat to Japan as "egregious and insulting," and urged Brown to apologise. During an interview with Radio New Zealand on November 18, Novelly suggested that Brown had been "captured" by the Chinese during his trip and said that he would welcome a discussion with the Mayor to present "some alternative viewpoints."

In response, Acting New Zealand Prime Minister David Seymour described Novelly's public reaction as "inadvisable" and advised him "to just dial it down a notch." Seymour also expressed disagreement with Brown's remarks praising China and criticising democracy. Meanwhile, University of Otago political scientist Robert Patman said it was "not becoming for a representative of the Trump Administration to lecture New Zealand on the intricacies of democracy" while President Trump was having trilateral meetings with Russian President Vladimir Putin and Chinese President Xi Jinping. Patman also described Brown's remarks about China as "ill-judged and naive." The Chinese Embassy in Wellington said it "had noted the relevant events" and invited New Zealanders to visit China for themselves. On November 20, New Zealand Labour Party politician Willie Jackson called for Novelly's expulsion in response to his criticism of Mayor Brown. In response, the Labour Party issued a statement distancing the party from Jackson's remarks, which they described as his personal views rather than party policy.

== Personal life ==
Novelly is a billionaire. From 2022 until his appointment as ambassador, he spent most of his time in Australia.

=== Political activity ===
Novelly is a Republican megadonor. An initial support of Nikki Haley's 2024 presidential campaign, he later donated to Trump.

Diplomatic posts
Preceded by Tom Udall	United States Ambassador to New Zealand; 2026–present	Incumbent
Preceded by Tom Udall	United States Ambassador to Samoa; 2026–present	Incumbent
