= Wheatland, California =

City in California, United States

- City
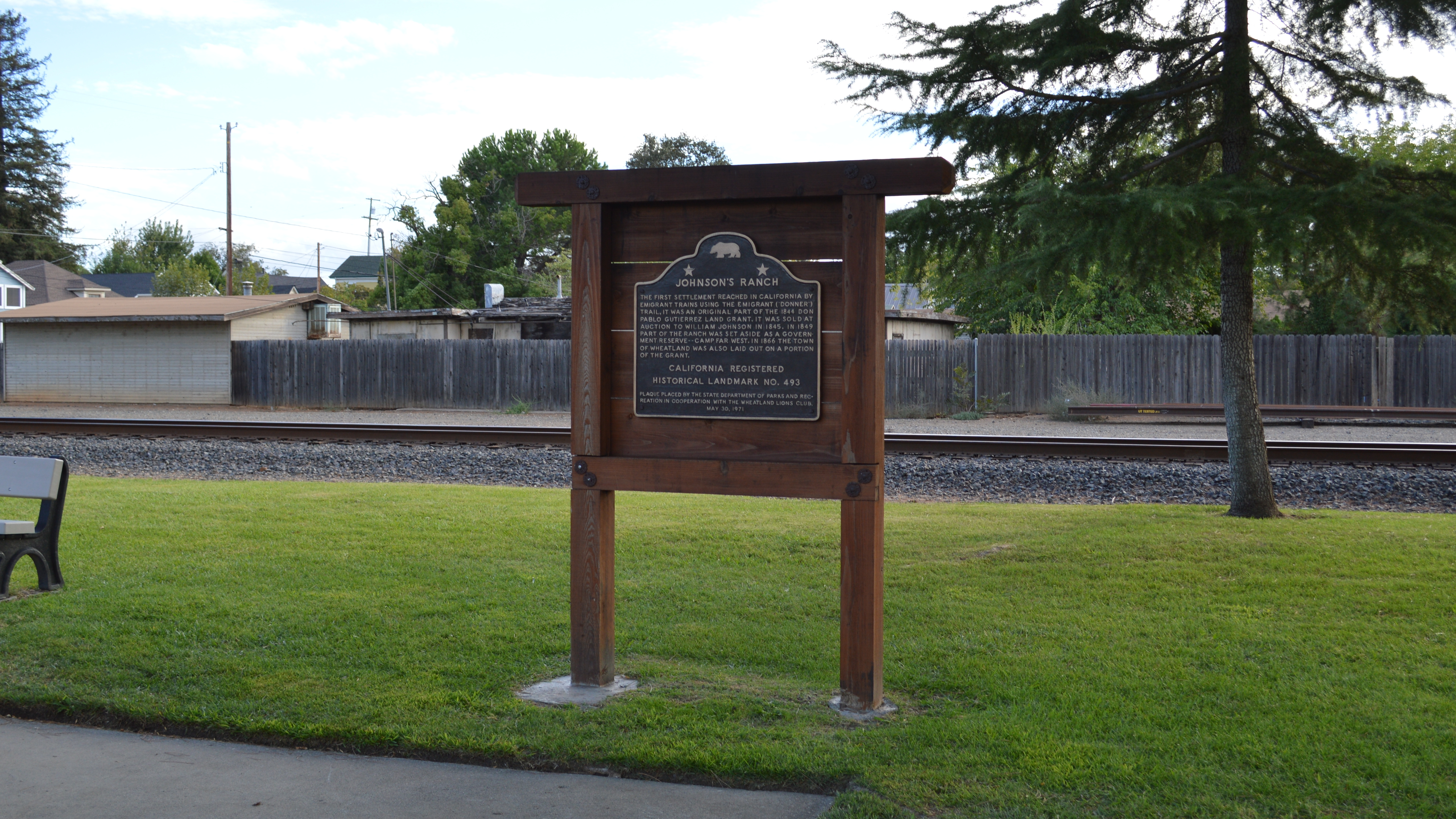
- Johnson's Ranch plaque
- Interactive map of Wheatland, California
- Location in the United States
- Coordinates: 39°00′36″N 121°25′23″W
- Country: United States
- State: California
- County: Yuba
- Incorporated: April 23, 1874

Area
  - Total: 8.13 sq mi (21.05 km^{2})
  - Land: 8.12 sq mi (21.04 km^{2})
  - Water: 0.0077 sq mi (0.02 km^{2}) 0.45%
- Elevation: 92 ft (28 m)

Population (2020)
  - Total: 3,712
  - Density: 456.9/sq mi (176.4/km^{2})
- Time zone: UTC-8 (Pacific)
  - Summer (DST): UTC-7 (PDT)
- ZIP code: 95692
- Area code: 530
- FIPS code: 06-85012
- GNIS feature ID: 1652652
- Website: www.wheatland.ca.gov

Wheatland is the second-largest city by population in Yuba County, California, United States. The population was 3,712 at the 2020 census, up from 3,456 at the 2010 census. Wheatland is located 12.5 miles (20 km) southeast of Marysville.

== Geography ==
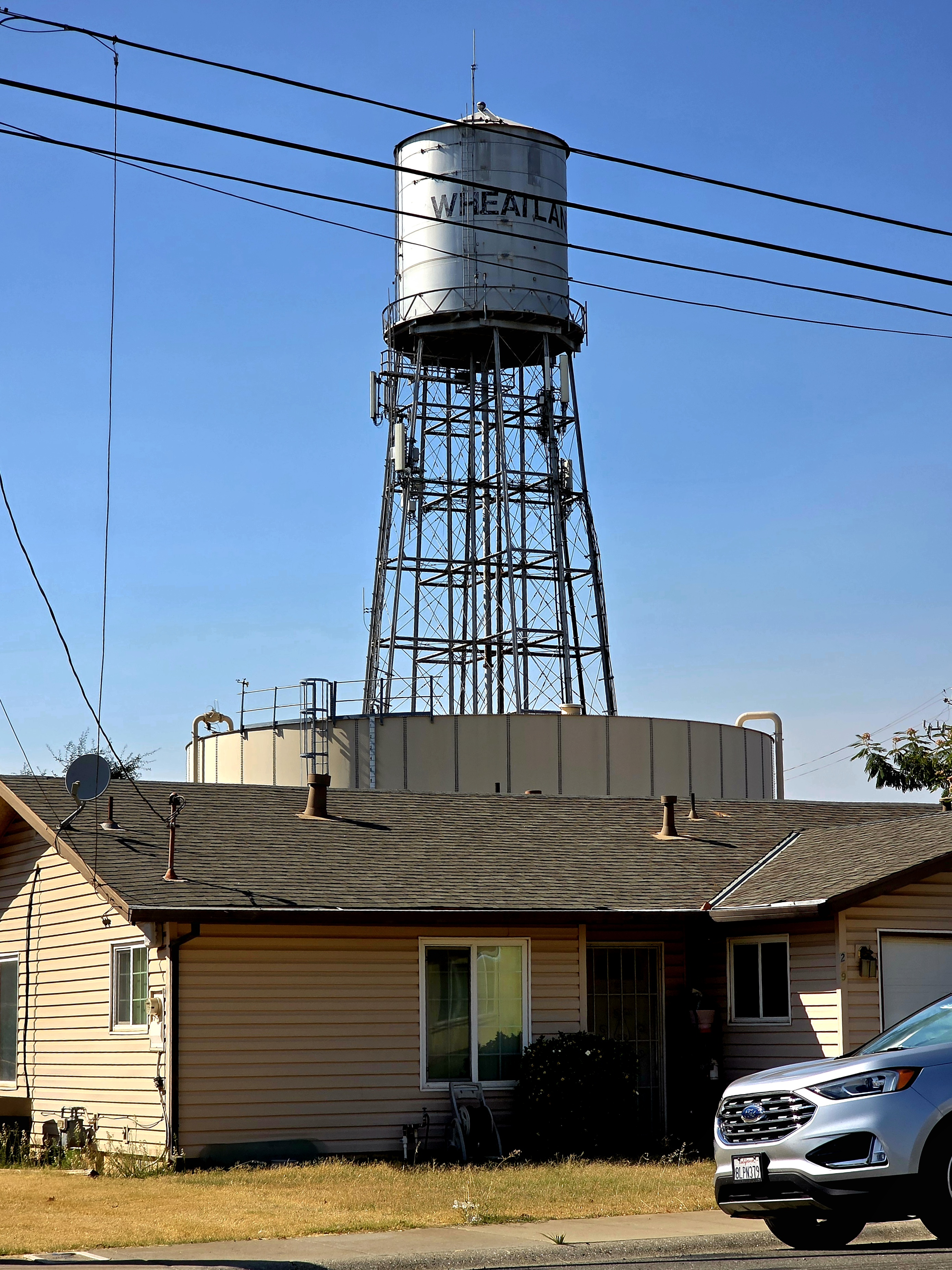
Wheatland water tower

Wheatland is located at 39°00′36″N 121°25′23″W.

According to the United States Census Bureau, the city has a total area of 8.1 square miles (21 km^{2}), over 99% of which is land.

In 2014, Wheatland annexed 4,500 acres (7.0 mi^{2}) of land, greatly increasing its footprint.

== History ==
Wheatland is located on the Rancho Johnson Mexican land grant. A post office opened in 1866. Wheatland incorporated in 1874.

Wheatland was home to a significant Chinese American community in the 1860s, but all of the Chinese American residents were driven out of town in a series of violent confrontations in February 1886.

In 1888, Edward Duplex was elected Mayor, the first black man to be elected mayor of a Western United States city. His original barbershop stands today on Main street.

Wheatland was the site of the bloody Hop Riot of 1913, considered a notable event in farm labor history that left four men dead, a Wheatland constable shot, and martial law imposed before it was over.

The three-time PBR World Champion Bull, Bushwhacker, was born in Wheatland.

== Climate ==
Climate data for Wheatland, California
Month	Jan	Feb	Mar	Apr	May	Jun	Jul	Aug	Sep	Oct	Nov	Dec	Year
Record high °F (°C)	76 (24)	83 (28)	89 (32)	97 (36)	105 (41)	113 (45)	111 (44)	112 (44)	113 (45)	104 (40)	89 (32)	79 (26)	113 (45)
Mean daily maximum °F (°C)	55 (13)	62 (17)	68 (20)	75 (24)	83 (28)	91 (33)	97 (36)	96 (36)	90 (32)	80 (27)	65 (18)	56 (13)	77 (25)
Daily mean °F (°C)	48 (9)	53 (12)	57.5 (14.2)	64.5 (18.1)	71.5 (21.9)	79 (26)	78 (26)	79.5 (26.4)	78 (26)	68 (20)	58 (14)	48 (9)	65.3 (18.6)
Mean daily minimum °F (°C)	39 (4)	43 (6)	46 (8)	49 (9)	55 (13)	60 (16)	64 (18)	62 (17)	59 (15)	52 (11)	45 (7)	40 (4)	51 (11)
Record low °F (°C)	20 (−7)	23 (−5)	26 (−3)	32 (0)	38 (3)	45 (7)	50 (10)	45 (7)	47 (8)	32 (0)	27 (−3)	17 (−8)	17 (−8)
Source: http://www.weather.com/weather/wxclimatology/monthly/graph/USCA0608

== Demographics ==
Historical population
Census	Pop.	Note	%±
1880	635		—
1890	630		−0.8%
1900	492		−21.9%
1910	481		−2.2%
1920	435		−9.6%
1930	479		10.1%
1940	496		3.5%
1950	581		17.1%
1960	813		39.9%
1970	1,280		57.4%
1980	1,474		15.2%
1990	1,631		10.7%
2000	2,275		39.5%
2010	3,456		51.9%
2020	3,712		7.4%
U.S. Decennial Census; 1860–1870 1880-1890; 1900 1910 1920; 1930 1940 1950; 1960 1970 1980; 1990 2000 2010; 2020

=== 2020 census ===
As of the 2020 census, Wheatland had a population of 3,712, all of whom lived in households. The population density was 457.0 inhabitants per square mile (176.4/km^{2}).

The age distribution was 27.2% under the age of 18, 8.2% aged 18 to 24, 27.8% aged 25 to 44, 23.8% aged 45 to 64, and 13.0% who were 65 years of age or older. The median age was 35.1 years. For every 100 females, there were 95.0 males, and for every 100 females age 18 and over there were 92.0 males age 18 and over.

0.0% of residents lived in urban areas, while 100.0% lived in rural areas.

There were 1,324 households, out of which 43.0% had children under the age of 18 living in them. Of all households, 51.4% were married-couple households, 8.1% were cohabiting couple households, 15.3% were households with a male householder and no spouse or partner present, and 25.3% were households with a female householder and no spouse or partner present. About 19.8% of all households were made up of individuals, and 9.4% had someone living alone who was 65 years of age or older. The average household size was 2.8, and there were 971 families (73.3% of all households).

There were 1,360 housing units, of which 2.6% were vacant. The homeowner vacancy rate was 0.8% and the rental vacancy rate was 1.0%. Of the occupied units, 63.0% were owner-occupied and 37.0% were occupied by renters.

Racial composition as of the 2020 census
Race	Number	Percent
White	2,532	68.2%
Black or African American	65	1.8%
American Indian and Alaska Native	57	1.5%
Asian	170	4.6%
Native Hawaiian and Other Pacific Islander	10	0.3%
Some other race	312	8.4%
Two or more races	566	15.2%
Hispanic or Latino (of any race)	835	22.5%

=== Income and poverty ===
In 2023, the US Census Bureau estimated that the median household income was $81,827, and the per capita income was $44,529. About 6.5% of families and 10.7% of the population were below the poverty line.

=== 2010 census ===
At the 2010 census Wheatland had a population of 3,456. The population density was 2,326.0 inhabitants per square mile (898.1/km^{2}). The racial makeup of Wheatland was 2,633 (76.2%) White, 41 (1.2%) African American, 58 (1.7%) Native American, 203 (5.9%) Asian, 5 (0.1%) Pacific Islander, 278 (8.0%) from other races, and 238 (6.9%) from two or more races. Hispanic or Latino of any race were 620 people (17.9%).

The whole population lived in households, no one lived in non-institutionalized group quarters and no one was institutionalized.

There were 1,219 households, 546 (44.8%) had children under the age of 18 living in them, 667 (54.7%) were opposite-sex married couples living together, 180 (14.8%) had a female householder with no husband present, 68 (5.6%) had a male householder with no wife present. There were 81 (6.6%) unmarried opposite-sex partnerships, and 1 (0.1%) same-sex married couples or partnerships. 245 households (20.1%) were one person and 105 (8.6%) had someone living alone who was 65 or older. The average household size was 2.84. There were 915 families (75.1% of households); the average family size was 3.28.

The age distribution was 1,024 people (29.6%) under the age of 18, 321 people (9.3%) aged 18 to 24, 968 people (28.0%) aged 25 to 44, 783 people (22.7%) aged 45 to 64, and 360 people (10.4%) who were 65 or older. The median age was 33.2 years. For every 100 females, there were 93.0 males. For every 100 females aged 18 and over, there were 91.0 males.

There were 1,323 housing units at an average density of 890.4 per square mile, of the occupied units 765 (62.8%) were owner-occupied and 454 (37.2%) were rented. The homeowner vacancy rate was 3.3%; the rental vacancy rate was 5.4%. 2,160 people (62.5% of the population) lived in owner-occupied housing units and 1,296 people (37.5%) lived in rental housing units.

== Education ==
Wheatland has 2 School districts, Wheatland School District which hosts the Primary and Middle schools. While Wheatland Union High School District serves the sole high school of the town.

The Wheatland School District serves Wheatland, Plumas Lake, and Beale Air Force Base. The school district has 5 Schools, 2 on base at Beale; Lone Tree School (Formerly Lone Tree Elementary School), and Wheatland Charter Academy.The remaining 3 are in the town of Wheatland; Wheatland Elementary School, Bear River School, and Wheatland School District Preschool.

The Wheatland Union High School District serves as the school district over Wheatland High School (California).

== Government ==
In the California State Legislature, Wheatland is in the 1st senatorial district, represented by Republican Megan Dahle, and in the 3rd Assembly district, represented by Vacant.

In the United States House of Representatives, Wheatland is in California's 1st congressional district, represented by Republican James Gallagher.

== Notable people ==
- Ann Getty, philanthropist
- H. Monroe Browne, diplomat
- Connie Redbird Pinkerman-Uri, doctor and lawyer

== See also ==
- Wheatland Hop Riot of 1913
- Toyota Amphitheatre
