= Paul Matthews Cleveland =

American diplomat (1931–2024)

11th United States Ambassador to Malaysia
- In office November 8, 1989 – July 23, 1992
- President: George H. W. Bush
- Preceded by: John Cameron Monjo
- Succeeded by: John Wolf

5th United States Ambassador to Samoa
- In office August 20, 1986 – April 28, 1989
- President: Ronald Reagan; George H. W. Bush
- Preceded by: H. Monroe Browne
- Succeeded by: Della M. Newman

16th United States Ambassador to New Zealand
- In office January 10, 1986 – April 28, 1989
- President: Ronald Reagan; George H. W. Bush
- Preceded by: H. Monroe Browne
- Succeeded by: Della M. Newman

Personal details
- Born: August 25, 1931 Boston, Massachusetts, U.S.
- Died: November 21, 2024 (aged 93) McLean, Virginia, U.S.

Paul Matthews Cleveland (August 25, 1931 – November 21, 2024) was an American diplomat who served as the United States Ambassador to New Zealand and Samoa from 1986 to 1989 and as the eleventh United States Ambassador to Malaysia from 1989 to 1992.

Cleveland died in McLean, Virginia on November 21, 2024, at the age of 93.

Diplomatic posts
Preceded by H. Monroe Browne	United States Ambassador to Samoa; 1986–1989	Succeeded by Della M. Newman
Preceded by H. Monroe Browne	United States Ambassador to New Zealand; 1986–1989	Succeeded by Della M. Newman
Preceded by John Cameron Monjo	United States Ambassador to Malaysia; 1989–1992	Succeeded by John Stern Wolf
