= Sonia Tomara =

Russian journalist (1897–1982)

- Born: 26 February 1897; St. Petersburg, Russia
- Died: 7 September 1982 (aged 85); Princeton Medical Center, New Jersey, United States
- Citizenship: Russia, France, U.S.
- Occupations: Journalist, war correspondent
- Years active: 1920–1947
- Employers: Le Matin; New York Herald Tribune
- Known for: Reporting from Europe and Asia during World War II
- Spouse: William Clark (m. 1947–1957)

Sonia Tomara (26 February 1897– 7 September 1982) was a Russian-born journalist who is regarded as the first female war correspondent of World War II.

Tomara is known for her foreign and war reporting for the New York Herald Tribune. As a staff writer, she reported on the onset of World War II in Europe, including the German invasion of Poland and the fall of France. Tomara reported from India, Burma, China, Egypt, and Iran. In 1943, she covered the Tehran Conference. By 1944, Tomara had returned to Europe to report on the Normandy campaign, the liberation of Paris, and the Seventh Army's advance through Alsace.

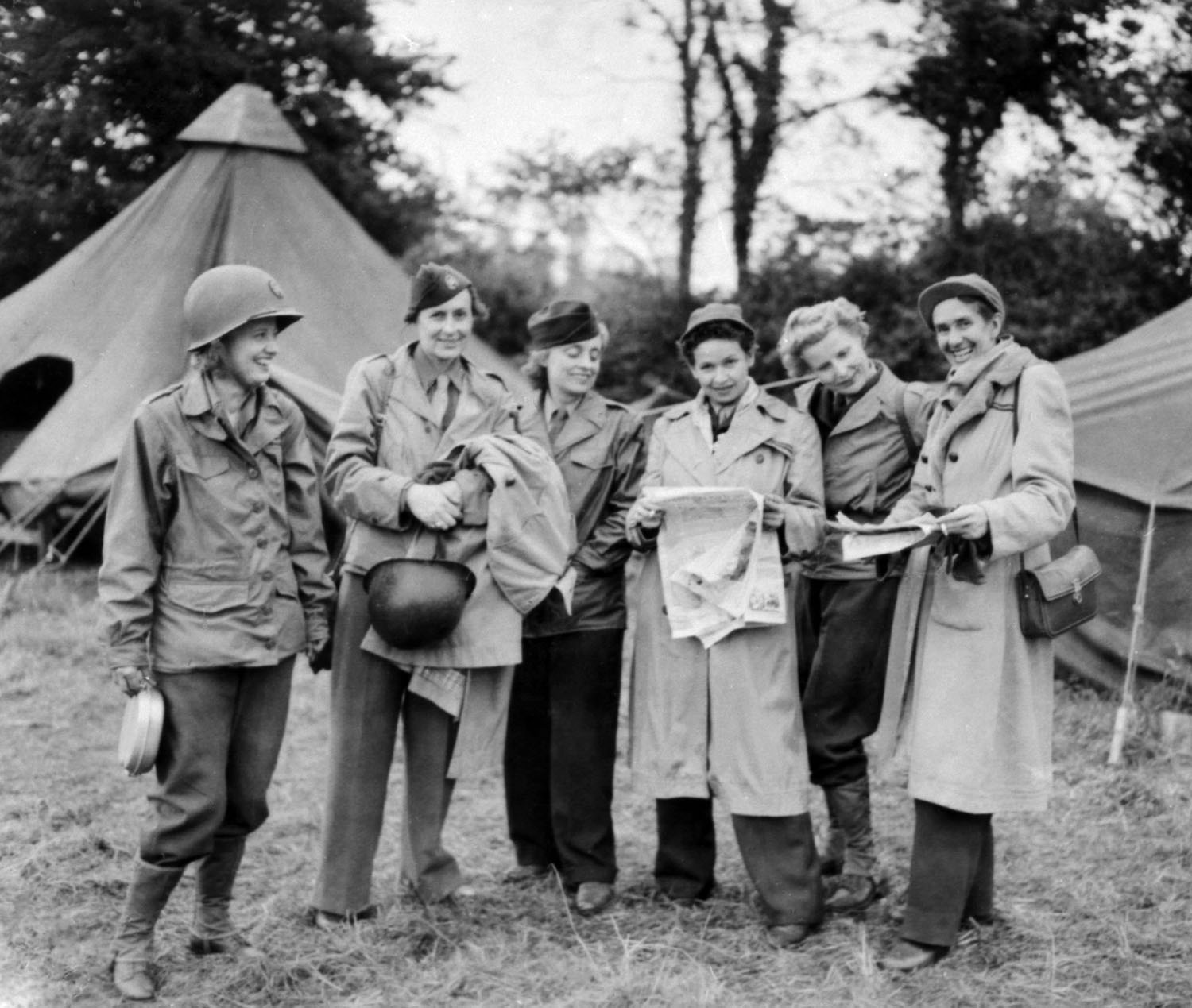
Women war correspondents during World War II in northern France in 1945. (Left to right) Ruth Cowan, Sonia Tomara, Rosette Hargrove, Betty Knox, Iris Carpenter, and Erika Mann.

== Life ==
Sonia Tomara was born to Michael and Olga Mamontoff Tomara on 26 February 1897 in St. Petersburg, Russia where she graduated with a degree in chemical engineering from the Moscow University for Women. In 1920, she fled with her mother to France during the Russian Revolution where she got employed as a political reporter and editor for Le Matin until in 1928 when she was recruited by the New York Herald Tribune.

During the 1930s, Tomara covered major events including the rise of Adolf Hitler and the battle of France following her return to Europe. After the 1940 armistice she was able to escape from France and make her way to the US via Portugal, after receiving a visa from the Portuguese consul general in Bordeaux, Aristides de Sousa Mendes. In 1942, she was elected president of the New York Newspaper Women's Club. She was accredited as a United States war correspondent later in the year and was assigned to the Far East to cover political stories in the China-Burma-India Theater. Jean Lyons of the Chinese News Bureau served as acting club president while she was away.

Tomara moved to China in May 1943 where she covered Nationalist Chinese military actions against Japan on the Yangtze River. In December 1943 Tomara reported on the Tehran Conference. She later moved to North Africa, covering the Allied Forces Headquarters in North Africa. In 1944, Sonia Tomara returned to Paris and resigned from the New York Herald Times following her marriage to William Clark in 1947.

== Death ==
In August 1982, Tomara was hospitalized after suffering a stroke. She died on 7 September at the Princeton Medical Center, New Jersey, U.S.

== See also ==
- Leland Stowe
- Ralph Barnes
