= Josiah H. Beeman V =

American politician (1935–2006)

Josiah Horton "Joe" Beeman V (October 8, 1935 – June 14, 2006) was an American political figure and ambassador. A longtime liberal and aide to Phillip Burton and Jerry Brown, Beeman's career included periods in trade unions, the church, government, and diplomacy.

== Early life and education ==
Beeman was born in San Francisco. He attended San Francisco public schools. He received his bachelor's degree, with a major in political science and government, from Reed College in Portland, Oregon in 1958 and earned a master's degree in government from San Francisco State University in 1959.

== Career ==
Beeman worked for the Social Security Administration serving as director of education for the Northern California Council of Churches from 1961 to 1963. He entered politics in 1964, when he became administrative assistant to U.S. Representative Phillip Burton, a Democrat.

While a legislative assistant, Beeman served as state president of the California Young Democrats; he participated in the Sproul Plaza sit-in during the Free Speech Movement, addressing a rally on December 2, 1964.

Beeman remained Burton's advisor for four years, until 1967, when Mayor John Shelley appointed him to serve out the unexpired term of George Moscone (who had been elected to the state Senate) on the San Francisco Board of Supervisors.

At the time, Beeman had already gained a reputation as a liberal, and his "political platform included cleaning up conflicts of interest at the Youth Guidance Center, allowing residents to vote on matters relating to the Vietnam War, and enacting 'some kind of business tax to bring relief to the city's property owners.'" Beeman organized for Robert F. Kennedy during his 1968 primary campaign for president. He became the first supervisor in city history to communicate with voters by newsletter. However, Beeman lost his bid for election to the Board of Supervisors in his own right, and in 1968, Beeman returned to work for Burton, moving to Washington. In 1969, Beeman left to become secretary for international affairs for the United Presbyterian Church in the United States of America. From 1970 to 1975, Beeman represented the church's Washington Office at international interdenominational meetings ahead of the church's merger with the Presbyterian Church in the United States, forming the Presbyterian Church (U.S.A.).)

Beeman left the Presbyterian Church in 1975 to become staff director of the House Democratic Caucus. Later that year, Governor Jerry Brown appointed him director of the Washington office of the State of California. He remained in that position for five years, representing California before congressional committees and federal agencies until 1980. The office was considered a Washington "listening post" for Brown. By 1980, Beeman has organized two political campaigns for Brown, and Brown named him national campaign manager for his Democratic primary bid. However, Beeman soon resigned as campaign manager, stating that the campaign was "one of the worst experiences of my life" and "an exercise that proves you can't win national political office with the swami vote."

From 1981 to 1983, Beeman served as director of political and legislative affairs for the American Federation of State, County and Municipal Employees. Beeman left to become executive director of the 1984 Democratic National Convention in San Francisco. However, Beeman resigned eight months before the convention to form a Sacramento-based consulting and lobbying firm, Beeman and Associates (formerly Beeman and Gould), which he led for 11 years as president. While living in Washington prior to being appointing ambassador, Beeman lived in a rowhouse in the Capitol Hill neighborhood behind the Supreme Court building, was a member of the Advisory Neighborhood Commission, and was a member of Capitol Hill Presbyterian Church.

=== Ambassadorship and retirement ===
Beeman was appointed U.S. ambassador of the United States to New Zealand and Samoa by President Bill Clinton on March 28, 1994. Beerman had come to Clinton's attention as chair of the Presbyterian Church's Northern Ireland Working Group, which worked for peace in Northern Ireland.

Beeman presented his credentials in New Zealand on May 10, 1994, and in Samoa on May 31, 1994, and remained ambassador until December 9, 1999.

During Beeman's five-year tenure, Clinton made the first international trip by a president to New Zealand in 32 years. Beeman also signed the Niue–United States Maritime Boundary Treaty on behalf of the United States on May 13, 1999. He was, with Sir Edmund Hillary, the principal speaker at the 40th anniversary celebration of the establishment of New Zealand's Scott Base in Antarctica.

During his tenure, according to The Washington Post, Beeman "occasionally clashed with New Zealand officials" on trade issues, genetically modified food, and New Zealand's nuclear-free zone, "but he presided over generally amicable relations between the countries." Upon leaving the country he said that he "was taking a large supply" of New Zealand wine back to America.

Upon his return to the United States, Beeman served as chief of staff for the Broadcasting Board of Governors, which manages Voice of America, Radio Free Europe, and Radio Free Asia. He retired in 2001.

Beeman moved to Falls Church, Virginia, and was a member of Falls Church Presbyterian Church. From June 2004 until shortly before he died, Beeman served as chairman of the Fairfax-Falls Church Community Services Board.

== Personal life ==
Beeman was married twice. His first wife was Linda Lee Beeman. Known for being an avid cane and stick collector, the oldest in his collection was a Spanish swordstick dating to 1550. The marriage ended in divorce, and Beeman subsequently remarried, to Susan L. Sturman Beeman, who was nearly 30 years his junior. They had two children, Olivia Louise Beeman and Josiah Horton Beeman VI. His daughter Olivia was born in New Zealand, the first baby to be born to a U.S. ambassador there; New Zealand Prime Minister Jenny Shipley sent the family a Buzzy Bee, an iconic New Zealand toy, after the birth.

Beeman was survived by his wife, his children, and a sister, Anne Lack of Pleasanton, California.

Beeman served as a Presbyterian lay minister from 1956 until his death. Beeman and his family were summer residents of Forest Place in Culver, Indiana.

Beeman died of renal failure at age 70 on June 14, 2006, at Virginia Hospital Center in Arlington.

== Notes ==
Diplomatic posts
Preceded by Sylvia Stanfield chargé d'affaires ad interim	United States Ambassador to New Zealand; Also accredited to Samoa; 1994–1999	Succeeded by Carol Moseley Braun
