= List of ambassadors of the United States to New Zealand =

Ambassador of the United States to New Zealand and Samoa
- Seal of the United States Department of State

- Flag of a United States ambassador

- Incumbent; Jared Novelly since July 1, 2026
- Nominator: The president of the United States
- Appointer: The president; with Senate advice and consent
- Inaugural holder: Patrick J. Hurley as Envoy
- Formation: April 24, 1942
- Website: U.S. Embassy - Wellington

The United States has maintained a consular presence in New Zealand since 1838. The first consul was James Reddy Clendon. Born in England, Clendon was a ship owner and merchant who bought land and settled in the Bay of Islands, New Zealand. In 1838 he was appointed by the federal government of the United States as consul for New Zealand. He was based at his property at Okiato, which in 1840 became the capital and was renamed Russell (not to be confused with present-day Russell). He held this position until 1841.

On January 13, 2026 President Donald Trump nominated businessman Jared Novelly to serve as United States Ambassador to New Zealand and Samoa. He was confirmed by the Senate on May 18, 2026, and began his tenure as Ambassador on July 1, 2026.

The ambassador to New Zealand is also accredited to Samoa though resident in Wellington.

== List of United States ambassadors to New Zealand ==
Name and title	Presentation of credentials	Termination of mission
Patrick J. Hurley, Envoy	April 24, 1942	August 12, 1942
William C. Burdett, Envoy	July 8, 1943	January 14, 1944
Kenneth S. Patton, Envoy	August 15, 1944	Oct 22, 1945
Avra M. Warren, Envoy	February 27, 1946	Jul 15, 1947
Robert M. Scotten, Envoy	April 7, 1948	December 22, 1948
Robert M. Scotten, Ambassador	December 22, 1948	February 1, 1955
Robert C. Hendrickson, Ambassador	February 16, 1955	November 20, 1956
Francis H. Russell, Ambassador	June 5, 1957	November 28, 1960
Anthony B. Akers, Ambassador	July 18, 1961	August 25, 1963
Herbert B. Powell, Ambassador	October 23, 1963	February 28, 1967
John F. Henning, Ambassador	April 5, 1967	September 9, 1969
Kenneth Franzheim II, Ambassador	October 7, 1969	November 1, 1972
Chalmers B. Wood, Chargé d'Affaires ad interim	November 1972	April 1974
Armistead I. Selden, Jr., Ambassador	April 22, 1974	April 23, 1979
Anne Clark Martindell, Ambassador	August 28, 1979	May 7, 1981
H. Monroe Browne, Ambassador	August 11, 1981	November 1, 1985
Paul Matthews Cleveland, Ambassador	January 10, 1986	April 28, 1989
Della M. Newman, Ambassador	October 25, 1989	December 21, 1992
David Walker, Chargé d'Affaires ad interim	December 21, 1992	August 1993
Sylvia Stanfield, Chargé d'Affaires ad interim	August 1993	May 10, 1994
Josiah Horton Beeman, Ambassador	May 10, 1994	December 9, 1999
Carol Moseley Braun, Ambassador	December 15, 1999	March 1, 2001
Philip Wall, Chargé d'Affaires ad interim	March 1, 2001	October 12, 2001
Charles J. Swindells, Ambassador	October 12, 2001	August 21, 2005
David R. Burnett, Chargé d'Affaires ad interim	August 22, 2005	November 8, 2005
William McCormick, Ambassador	November 9, 2005	December 20, 2008
David J. Keegan, Chargé d'Affaires ad interim	December 20, 2008	August 21, 2009
David Huebner, Ambassador	December 4, 2009	January 17, 2014
Mark Gilbert, Ambassador	February 9, 2015	January 20, 2017
Candy Green, Chargé d'Affaires ad interim	January 20, 2017	June 25, 2017
Scott Brown, Ambassador	July 27, 2017	December 20, 2020
Kevin Covert, Chargé d'Affaires ad interim	December 20, 2020	December 2, 2021
Tom Udall	December 2, 2021	January 14, 2025
David Gehrenbeck, Chargé d'Affaires ad interim	January 15, 2025	July 1, 2026
Jared Novelly	July 1, 2026	Present

== See also ==
- Embassy of the United States, Wellington
- New Zealand - United States relations
- Samoa - United States relations
- Foreign relations of New Zealand
- Foreign relations of Samoa
- Ambassadors of the United States
- Contents of the United States diplomatic cables leak (New Zealand)
