= Murder in New Jersey law =

Murder in New Jersey law constitutes the intentional killing, under circumstances defined by law, of people within or under the jurisdiction of the U.S. state of New Jersey.

== Definition ==
Under the 2023 New Jersey Revised Statutes, murder is defined as the unlawful killing of another human being with malice aforethought. The statute also differentiates between degrees of murder and specifies sentencing based on aggravating circumstances.

== Penalties ==
The Constitution of New Jersey, Article 1, Paragraph 12, states: "It shall not be cruel and unusual punishment to impose the death penalty on a person convicted of purposely or knowingly causing death or purposely or knowingly causing serious bodily injury resulting in death who committed the homicidal act by his own conduct or who as an accomplice procured the commission of the offense by payment or promise of payment of anything of pecuniary value." In the 1987 case of State v. Gerald, however, the New Jersey Supreme Court struck down the death penalty statute as unconstitutional, ruling that it failed to sufficiently narrow the class of murderers eligible for capital punishment, effectively ending the death penalty in the state. In the 1996 case of State v. DiFrisco, the court affirmed the imposition of life without parole for aggravated murder, upholding it as a permissible penalty for the most serious offenses.

Offense	Mandatory sentencing
Second degree murder	Minimum of 15 years, maximum of life imprisonment with parole.
First degree murder	Minimum of 30 years with parole eligibility after serving 85% of the sentence; maximum of life imprisonment without parole.
First degree murder (with aggravating circumstances)	Life without parole (defendant must serve 30 years and release is an only option if they were under 18)

== Statistics ==
In 2020, New Jersey reported a total of 289 homicides, which the United States Centers for Disease Control and Prevention reported as well below the median for the entire country. However, certain cities such as Camden, New Jersey, and Newark, New Jersey, report higher concentrations of violent crime, including homicides, compared to the state average.
