= Frank H. Eggers =

American politician (1901–1954)

Frank Hague Eggers
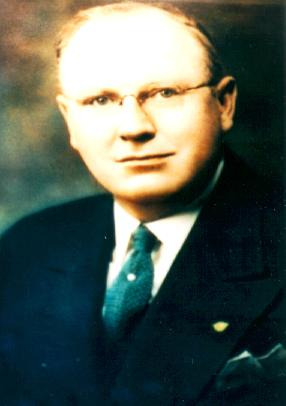

31st Mayor of Jersey City
- In office June 17, 1947 – May 16, 1949
- Preceded by: Frank Hague
- Succeeded by: John V. Kenny

Personal details
- Born: February 22, 1901 Jersey City, New Jersey
- Died: July 8, 1954 (aged 53) Jersey City, New Jersey
- Party: Democratic
- Spouse: Mary McDonald

Frank Hague Eggers (February 22, 1901 – July 8, 1954) was an American attorney, jurist, and Democratic Party politician who served as the mayor of Jersey City, New Jersey, from 1947 to 1949. Eggers was appointed mayor following the retirement of his uncle, Frank Hague, though it was understood that his uncle continued to hold the real power. He served the balance of his uncle's eighth term. However, he was defeated in 1949 by John V. Kenny, ending the Hague organization's three-decade rule.

Prior to serving as mayor, Eggers had served as a city and county judge, spent four years as personal secretary to Mayor Hague, and served on the city commission in Jersey City. Eggers was a delegate to the New Jersey Constitutional Convention of 1947, and signatory of the resulting New Jersey State Constitution. He later served as a director of the New Jersey State Bar Association.

Eggers died of a cerebral hemorrhage on July 8, 1954, at the age of 53. His wake was held at the Quinn funeral home which operated in the Van Wagenen House. His uncle, Hague, was served with a subpoena during the event. Eggers was interred at Holy Name Cemetery.
