= Frank Hague =

Mayor of Jersey City from 1917 to 1947

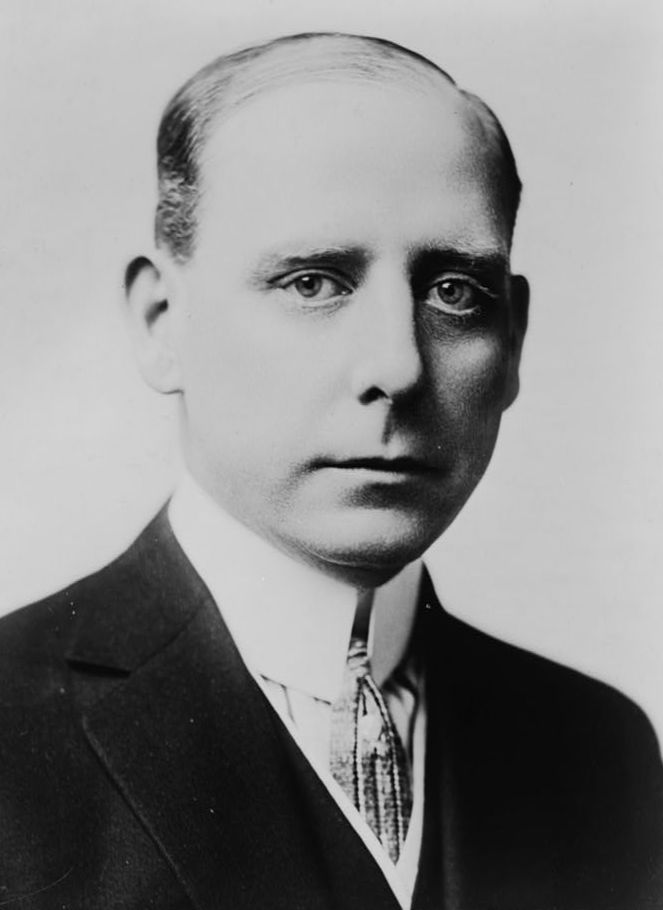
- Hague in 1920

30th Mayor of Jersey City
- In office May 15, 1917 – June 17, 1947
- Preceded by: Mark Matthew Fagan
- Succeeded by: Frank Hague Eggers

Personal details
- Born: January 17, 1876 Jersey City, New Jersey, U.S.
- Died: January 1, 1956 (aged 79) New York City, U.S.
- Party: Democratic
- Spouse: Jennie W. Warner
- Children: 3, including one adopted

Francis Hague (January 17, 1876 – January 1, 1956), known as Frank Hague, was an American politician of the Democratic Party who served as mayor of Jersey City, New Jersey, from 1917 to 1947, and vice-chairman of the Democratic National Committee from 1924 until 1952. Hague ran a political machine that dominated the politics of Hudson County, and of the entire state of New Jersey. During his 30 years as mayor, Hague's influence reached the national level. His ability to secure huge majorities in Hudson County for the Democrats won statewide races for governor and U.S. president, and his machine dispensed jobs and aid in exchange for votes. Among the projects built under Hague were the Jersey City Medical Center, then the third-largest hospital in the world, and Roosevelt Stadium.

Hague was born in Jersey City, the son of Irish immigrants, and left school in the sixth grade. In 1896, he began his political rise with his election as constable for Jersey City's Second Ward. In 1913, he became commissioner of public safety as one of five members of the city's governing body, and over the next four years he did much to clean up Jersey City's decrepit police and fire departments. Re-elected in 1917, his fellow commissioners chose him as mayor.

Hague quickly became a power in New Jersey, electing three Democratic governors in succession who would have lost if not for Hudson County. He successfully campaigned to defeat a proposal to move the governor's election to a presidential year, as all three Republican presidential candidates of the 1920s won New Jersey. This changed in 1932 when, after a shaky start, Hague allied with Franklin D. Roosevelt, staging a huge rally for him. Hudson County outweighed the rest of the state to win New Jersey for Roosevelt, and Roosevelt rewarded Hague by steering federal money through him, greatly increasing his power, and by shielding him from possible prosecution.

By the 1940s, Hague was spending much time vacationing outside the city, which was changing as other ethnic groups challenged the longtime Irish dominance. He resigned in 1947 in favor of his nephew, Frank Hague Eggers, who was defeated in the 1949 municipal elections. After that, Hague remained in exile from Jersey City for fear of legal action until his 1956 death.

== Early life ==
The mayor of Jersey City, Boss Frank Hague, had been born poor and honest but, through unstinting hard work, had overcome those handicaps.

— Governor Brendan Byrne
in New Jersey Governor Brendan Byrne
(eBook edition) pp. 235–236

Francis "Frank" Hague was born January 17, 1876, in Jersey City, New Jersey, the fourth of eight children to John D. and Margaret Hague (née Fagen), immigrants from County Cavan, Ireland. John Hague had fled Ireland due to his involvement in a conspiracy against the British, and served as a soldier for the Pope during the Italian Wars of Independence. He then journeyed to New Jersey, where he served as a blacksmith for the Erie Railroad and later as a bank guard, a job gotten for him by the local Democratic Party leader. Margaret Hague ruled the family with an iron hand, and was called by one neighbor, "a bitch on wheels".

Jersey City in the late 19th century was an important rail terminus and manufacturing center, with close trade ties to nearby New York City, and a destination where many recent immigrants lived. Frank Hague was raised in Jersey City's Second Ward, an area known as the Horseshoe because of its shape, which wrapped around a railroad loop. In the Horseshoe, money was scarce but saloons plentiful; recreation for the local youths included visiting the wealthier parts of town to battle young "lace curtain" Irish.

Frank Hague was born in a tenement known as "The Ark" – after a rainstorm, it was surrounded by stagnant water. Hague was expelled from school for poor attendance and unacceptable behavior before completing the sixth grade at Public School No. 21 in Jersey City. This completed his formal education before the age of 14. He worked briefly as a blacksmith's apprentice for the Erie Railroad, joining his father on the payroll. Why he left the employment of the railroad is not known. While training at a local gym for his own potential debut as a prizefighter, he arranged to become manager for Joe Craig, a professional lightweight boxer. Craig was successful enough to allow Hague to buy a few suits that made him appear successful. In 1896, Hague's apparent prosperity gained him the attention of local tavern owner "Nat" Kenny who was seeking a candidate for constable in the upcoming primary to run against the candidate of a rival tavern owner, though Hague was a lifelong teetotaler. Kenny provided Hague with $75 ($2,903 in 2025) to "spread around", and Frank Hague, at age 20, won his first election by a ratio of three-to-one.

== Political rise ==
=== Early advancement ===
Frank Hague, the candidate for Constable, is one of the most popular young men in the ward, and is also a member of the [Banquet] club. He made a neat speech and urged every member to work hard for the success of the ticket from top to bottom and predicted that the Second Ward would hold her own in the Democratic column with a very big majority.

— "Democratic Candidates Endorsed"
in The Jersey City News, April 1, 1896, p. 1

In entering politics in Jersey City, Hague joined a world where massive voter fraud was commonplace, accompanied by violence, though clubs were more often the weapon of choice than firearms. Hague's victory in the constable election brought him to the attention of Hudson County Democratic political boss Bob Davis, and Davis asked Hague to help get out Democratic votes for the upcoming 1897 mayoral election. Hague's efforts were credited with generating large voter turnout in the Second Ward for the 1897 and 1899 elections. As a reward for his work, Hague was appointed as a deputy sheriff at a salary of $25 per week.

In 1901, Hague became a precinct leader in the Davis organization. In that year's mayoral election, Republican Mark M. Fagan was elected to the first of three consecutive two-year terms. Hague's Second Ward was one of only two that voted Democratic. Hague survived a Republican challenge for another term as constable the following year. Hague spent much time at City Hall, expanding his political contacts, and occasionally served a summons or took a convict to the state prison at Trenton. In 1903, he married Jenny Warner, also of the Horseshoe; they had two children, a daughter who died in infancy, and a son, Frank Hague Jr., who would become a judge of New Jersey's highest court. They also adopted a daughter, Margaret.

As a ward leader, Hague was approached by a woman to aid her son. The son, Red Dugan, had been a classmate of Hague's and had been arrested in Massachusetts for forging a check. Hague ignored a subpoena to testify in Hudson County court and provided an alibi for Dugan. Hague and another deputy sheriff, Thomas "Skidder" Madigan, claimed that they had seen Dugan in Jersey City on the day of the offense, but their testimony conflicted with Dugan's confession. Both were threatened with perjury charges. Upon returning to Jersey City, Hague was found guilty of contempt of court for ignoring the subpoena. He was fined $100 and stripped of his office as deputy sheriff, but his willingness to help a friend endeared him to the residents of the Second Ward. Progressive voters outside the Horseshoe were less impressed, and the Dugan affair caused Hague difficulty in his citywide elections until he became mayor.

Hague rose through the Democratic machine of Hudson County, which drew much of its strength by providing newly arrived immigrants with rudimentary social services. Hague took a job as a bill collector for a local brewery, leaving him with time to spend in the streets and the local taverns which were hubs of political activity. By 1906, Hague had become prominent enough that he could ask a job of Davis. He was given the position of sergeant at arms for the New Jersey General Assembly–the lower house of the legislature had just been captured by the Democrats, and in the division of the political spoils, the position of sergeant at arms fell to Hudson County. Davis also named Hague to the Democratic executive committee for Hudson County.

=== City official ===
Hague broke ties with "Boss" Davis in 1906 over a difference of opinion on a candidate for appointment to the city Street and Water Board. As a result, Hague supported H. Otto Wittpenn for mayor in the 1907 election. Wittpenn was a reformer who opposed the control Davis held over Hudson County politics. Nevertheless, he made a deal with Davis to gain election over Fagan in 1907. Over the objections of Davis, newly elected Mayor Wittpenn appointed Hague as chief custodian of City Hall – an easy job with plenty of patronage opportunities. Davis tried to deprive Hague of the office, but Hague outmaneuvered him.

Hague also became friendly with Wittpenn's secretary – a Presbyterian Sunday school teacher named A. Harry Moore. Probably the first Protestant Hague knew personally, Moore would be presented by Hague to the Irish Catholics of Jersey City in future elections as a WASP trustworthy because Hague controlled him. Moore would serve three terms as governor of New Jersey. Another lasting alliance Hague made was with John Milton, a young lawyer who would advise him in the decades to come, and who would become a United States Senator.

In 1909 Davis supported Wittpenn's successful re-election against former mayor Fagan. Hague's Second Ward produced the largest plurality of Wittpenn votes of any of Jersey City's 12 wards. Wittpenn in 1910 sought the Democratic nomination for governor, with Hague's support. Davis worked to defeat him, and the nomination went to the president of Princeton University, Woodrow Wilson. The nominee requested that Wittpenn withdraw a rival slate to Davis's in Jersey City to ensure party unity; Wittpenn agreed over Hague's objection, who kept the slate in the Second Ward from withdrawing. Hague's candidates were defeated, and the incident could have ruined Hague's political career, but by then Wittpenn and Hague had learned of Davis's maneuvering to defeat the mayor's candidacy and allied against Davis. Hague and Wittpenn were able to claim credit for Wilson's victory, and Davis died in early 1911.

Davis's death contributed to Hague's rise, since Wittpenn, who desired to succeed Wilson as governor, did not control Democratic politics in Hudson County as thoroughly as Davis had. Hague in 1911 was elected street and water commissioner. The new position greatly expanded Hague's patronage powers. While City Hall employed a few dozen custodians, there were hundreds of workers in the Street and Water Department.

One of the greatest boosts to Hague's rise to power was the Walsh Act of 1911. This legislation, backed by Governor Wilson, allowed municipalities to adopt a nonpartisan commission form of government, with each commissioner assigned specific responsibilities. Jersey City adopted it, with the first elections held in 1913. Originally, Hague opposed commission government, but saw that it would be easier to control a five-member commission than a large city council, and was a candidate, presenting himself as a reformer who was sacrificing two years of his elected term as street commissioner to serve on the new body. He broke with Wittpenn, who was again seeking election as governor following Wilson's elevation to the presidency, backing James Fielder, who defeated Wittpenn for the nomination. Hague's work as head of the Department of Street Cleaners even convinced The Jersey Journal to endorse him as a reform candidate.

Under the Walsh Act as adopted in Jersey City, power would mean controlling at least three of the five commissionerships. Hague and Moore allied with former mayor Fagan to form a slate before the June 10, 1913, election. Although two Wittpenn men were also chosen, Hague, a member of Jersey City's largest ethnic bloc, Irish Catholics, was seen as a voice of change in a city long dominated by Protestants of the Republican Party. Fagan, Moore and Hague were all elected commissioners, with Fagan made mayor and Hague commissioner of public safety.

=== Commissioner ===
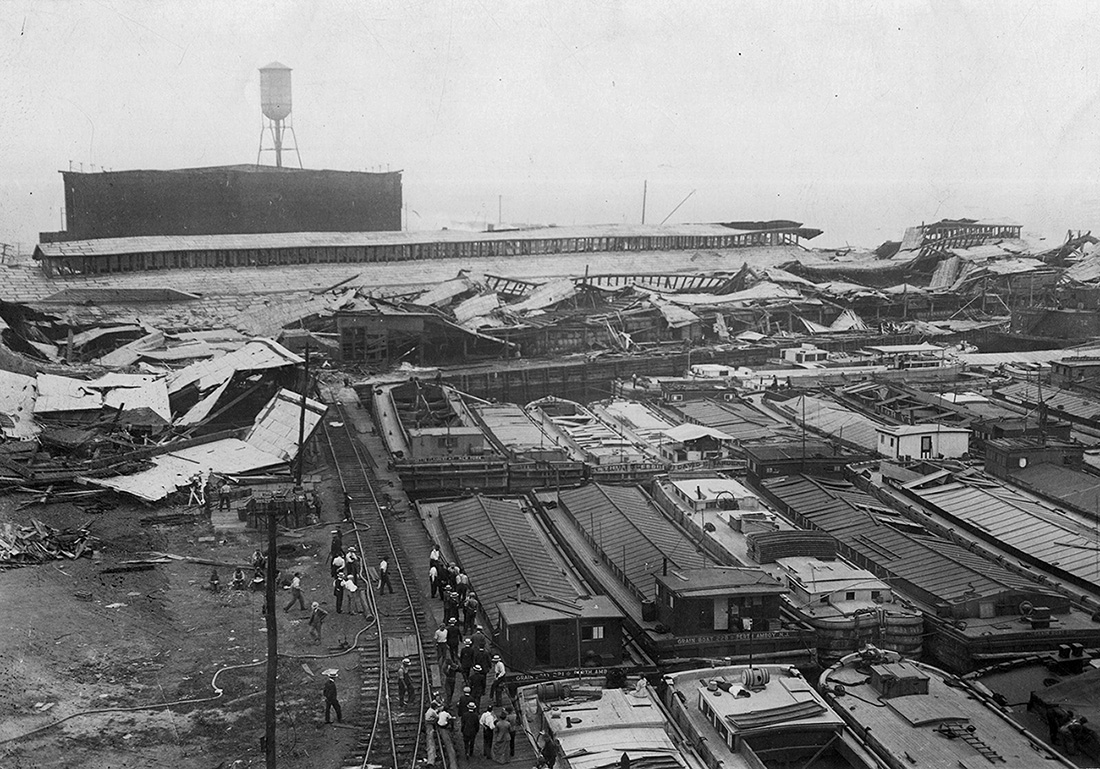
Aftermath of the Black Tom explosion, an act of sabotage on American ammunition exports by German agents which took place on July 30, 1916, in Jersey City

Jersey City police, to that point, had been only slightly less frightening to the residents than were the criminals. Hague immediately set about reshaping the corrupt police force with tough Horseshoe recruits. Although the commissioner of public safety originally did not have the power to dismiss police officers, Milton authored an amendment to the Walsh Act that conferred this power, and Hague used it to fire hundreds of officers and dissolve their unions. Hague spearheaded crackdowns on prostitution and narcotics trafficking, earning him favor with religious leaders. Hague himself marched across local vaudeville stages, directing the shutdown of "girlie shows". Nevertheless, he turned a blind eye to Jersey City's well-patronized gambling parlors. At the heart of this change was an inner cadre of officers known as the Zeppelin Squad or "zepps" who were loyal to Hague alone. The "zepps" would spy on other members of the department, and report back to Hague. Eventually, Jersey City had one patrolman for every 3,000 residents, causing a marked decline in the city's once-astronomical crime rate.

Hague took steps to curb the police department's lackadaisical work ethic, purging the force of drunkards and others who had gained and kept their jobs through their political connections. He announced that no longer would it be possible to break the law and bribe a politician to get away with it. Commissioner Hague led high-profile campaigns against threats to public safety, which had the effect of promoting him as someone who knew how to get things done. He kept his immigrant base onside by ignoring violations of the blue laws by saloons.

Upon discovering in early 1916 that millions of pounds of munitions were being stockpiled on the Jersey City waterfront prior to their shipment to the Allies of World War I, Hague traveled to Washington, D.C. to register concerns for the safety of his constituents. His meetings with congressmen resulted in no action. Hague's concerns were shown to be valid in July 1916 when the Black Tom explosion caused $20 million in damage, including to the nearby Statue of Liberty.

Hague's influence grew, and he was able to undermine Wittpenn's 1916 campaign for governor. While the evidence is scant, Hague is believed to have made a deal with Republican candidate Walter Edge's campaign manager, the Republican boss of Atlantic City, Nucky Johnson. Instead of receiving a 20,000-plus vote margin in Hudson County, as had the past two Democratic candidates including Wilson, Wittpenn, who lived in Hudson County, won there by only 7,400 votes and was defeated statewide. According to author and judge Nelson Johnson, "From then on, Otto Wittpenn and the progressive wing of the Democratic Party were no longer a factor in Frank Hague's political calculations."

In a tumultuous scene in the city hall council chamber, packed with howling Horseshoe supporters, Hague was unanimously chosen mayor of Jersey City by the new commissioners. More than three decades would pass before another man stood there to receive similar acclaim.

— Thomas Fleming

Hague gained popularity with a well-publicized incident where he led a posse to Newark and captured Michael Rombolo, who had killed Frank Kenny, son of saloon owner Ned Kenny. Hague himself took down the armed killer, who was returned to Jersey City in Hague's car amid a parade of honking vehicles crossing the Hackensack River from Newark.

In 1917, Hague, with his reputation as the man who cleaned up the police force, ran for re-election. He put together a commission ticket called "The Unbossed". Wittpenn and Fagan begged President Wilson for help against Hague, but according to Thomas Fleming in his history of the state, "Wilson was too absorbed with saving the world to pay any more attention to New Jersey." Hague's ticket swept all five spots on the commission. with Hague finishing second in number of votes to Moore, and the new commissioners chose Hague as mayor. He would remain a power in Jersey City, Hudson County, New Jersey and the nation for the next thirty years. Wrote historian Steven Hart, "The city election of 1917 would later be seen as the death of the Progressive movement in New Jersey, though few realized it at the time since talk of reform was still thick in the air."

== Mayor ==
=== Rising figure ===
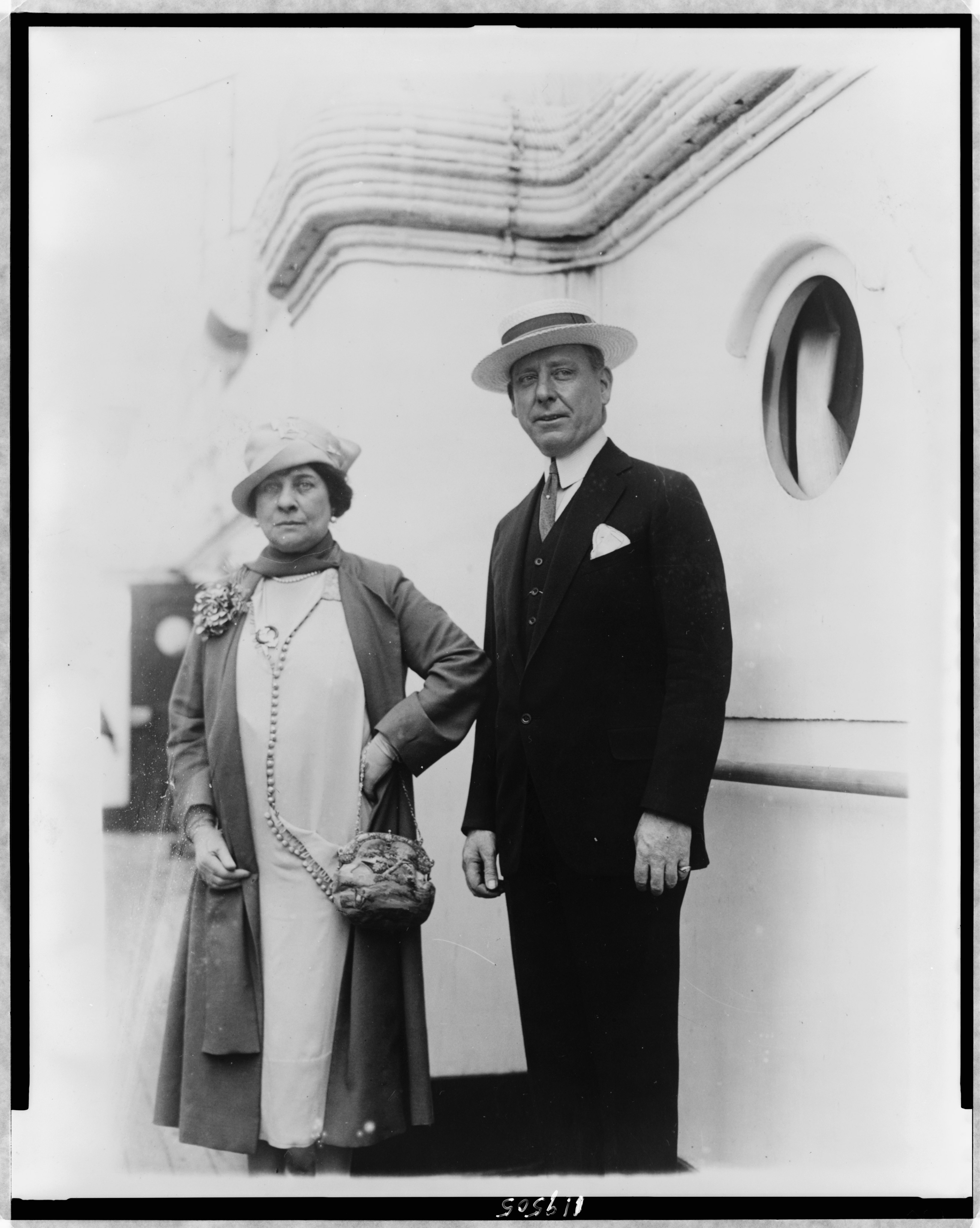
Frank and Jennie Hague, 1925

After his election as mayor, Hague quickly sought to increase taxes on the railroads and utility companies that occupied much of Jersey City's land but paid minimal property taxes. The taxes were passed but were soon reversed by the statewide tax board in Trenton. Hague realized that he needed not only to control Hudson County, but the entire state of New Jersey, and sought a pliable candidate for governor for the next election in 1919. He decided on Hudson County's state senator, Edward I. Edwards, who was best known for his service as state comptroller, during which he had docked Wilson's pay for the time he spent running for president. Opponents had trouble finding anyone willing to oppose Edwards for the nomination, and eventually Essex County's Democratic boss Jim Nugent ran. Edwards won the primary election by a large margin and, at Hague's urging, ran on the issue of Prohibition, which Hague believed unpopular in the state, with Edwards pledging to make New Jersey "wetter than the Atlantic Ocean". With 20 of New Jersey's 21 counties reporting, the Republican, Newton Bugbee, had a 21,000-vote lead, a lead swamped by the 36,000-vote margin posted for Edwards in Hudson County. As one of his first acts, Edwards fired the entire tax assessments board; the new board approved Hague's taxes on the railroads and utilities. In part due to increased taxes on non-local corporations such as railroads, by 1930 Jersey City had the highest municipal tax rate in the nation. Through Edwards, Hague was able to select Hudson County's judges and prosecutors, making himself immune from investigation.

The revenue from the new taxes allowed Hague to hire his supporters and provide social service programs to the electorate. Hague proclaimed himself leader of the New Jersey Democratic Party, and Edwards allowed him to recommend dozens of appointments to high state offices. Democrats won five out of eight gubernatorial races between 1919 and 1940, more often than not due to massive landslides in Hudson County. However, he was never able to extend his dominance to the state legislature, which remained Republican in most years.

By the 1921 municipal elections, most of Hague's local rivals had left the scene either through death or departure from Jersey City. The major opposition in that year was from the Republicans, running on a fusion ticket with dissident Democrats. Hague easily triumphed. His tight control of the Hudson County Democratic Party, together with the reluctance of high-profile nonpartisan individuals to oppose him, meant that a weak Hudson County Republican Party provided the opposition to Hague through much of the remainder of his time as mayor. With Edwards ineligible to run for a second consecutive term under the New Jersey Constitution, Hague needed a new candidate, and found one in Judge George Silzer of Middlesex County. In the 1922 gubernatorial election, Hudson County again erased a Republican lead to elect the Democrat, while Edwards moved to the U.S. Senate by beating incumbent Republican Joseph S. Frelinghuysen.

Republicans presented evidence to the county prosecutor of individuals voting multiple times, and dead people recorded as casting a ballot. They showed that Republicans had voted in precincts where the Republican vote was recorded as zero. The county prosecutor was Milton, and no one was charged.

=== Boss of New Jersey ===
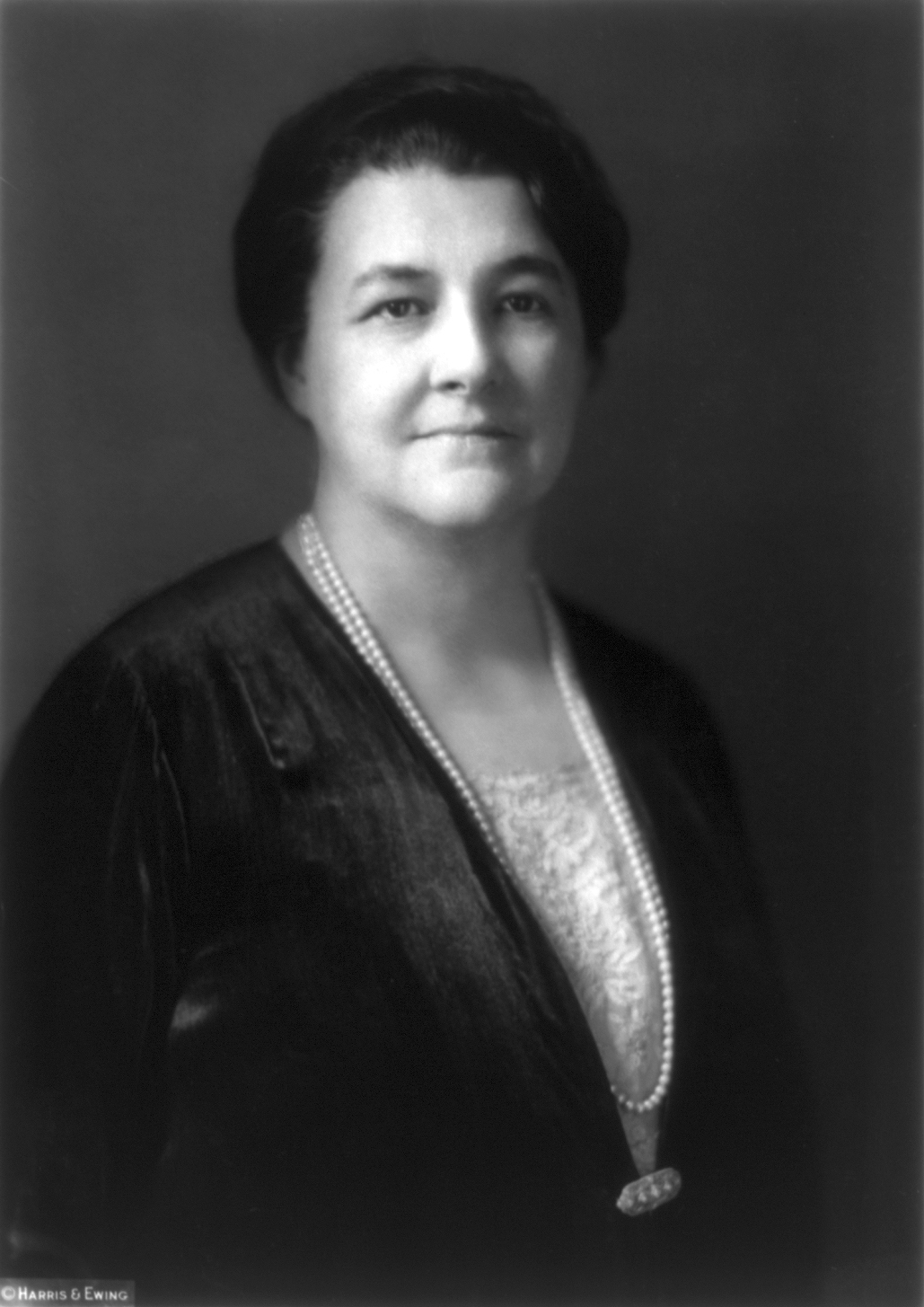
Mary Norton

Hague supported the state's ratification of the Nineteenth Amendment to the United States Constitution, guaranteeing women the vote, leading to New Jersey in 1920 becoming the 29th state to ratify the amendment. Thereafter, Hague made sure that his slate of candidates for the legislature always included a woman, beginning with Irene Brown, one of the first women to serve in a state legislature in the United States. Brown was followed by May Carty and Catherine Finn. He furthered the career of Mary Norton, who had been a social worker who approached Hague for funds for a daycare center, and went on to serve on the Hudson County Board of Chosen Freeholders before being elected, in 1924, to the first of thirteen terms in the U.S. House of Representatives, representing New Jersey's 12th congressional district (at that time, Jersey City and Bayonne). Though not the first woman to serve in Congress, she was the only one at the time of her 1925 swearing-in. She would go on to chair congressional committees and play a significant role in the passage of the New Deal.

In 1925, Moore became the third consecutive Democratic governor elected with Hague's help. Moore was more able to cooperate with the Republican legislature than his two predecessors, leading to state jobs for Hague's followers. Through this series of governors, Hague was able to consolidate his rule through control of the civil service, taxing authority and patronage. In 1927, the Republicans, tired of losing off-year elections, proposed a state constitutional amendment to increase the governor's term from three to four years, and move that election to the presidential election year. Hague led the battle against the proposal, which was defeated thanks to Hudson County voters' overwhelming opposition. To defeat a critic, Robert Carey, who sought the Republican gubernatorial nomination in 1928, and who Hague believed would be harder to beat, Hague got 20,000 Democrats who had not voted in the previous year's primary to vote for Morgan F. Larson in the Republican primary. State law at the time allowed those who had not voted in the previous year's primary election to vote in any party primary without penalty. Hague's string of victories in gubernatorial elections ended, though, as Larson was elected.

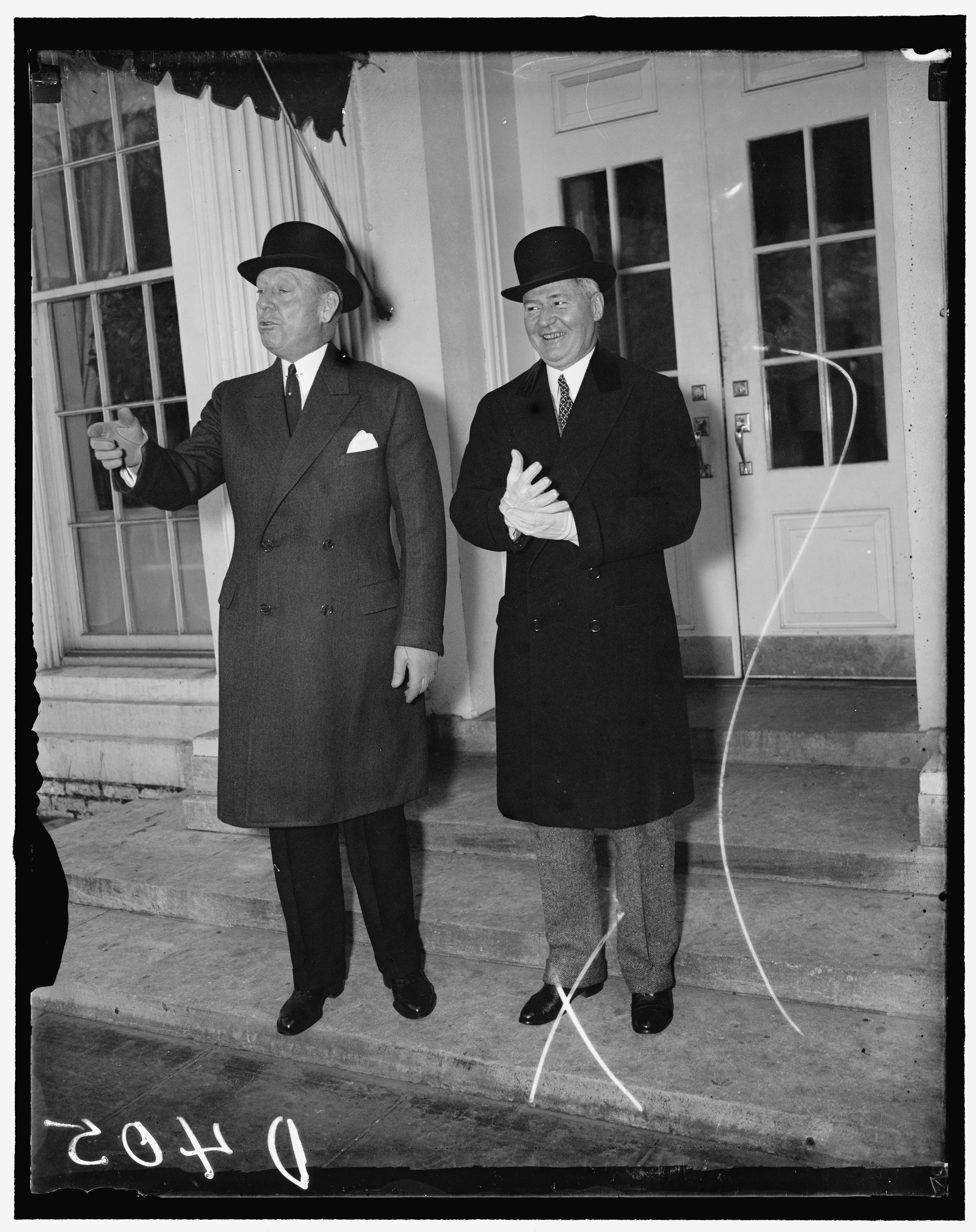
Hague (left) with three-time governor A. Harry Moore, 1936

Hague's meddling in the 1928 Republican primary led to the last serious effort by Republicans to deny him re-election, in the 1929 municipal elections. Despite this effort, Hague's ticket defeated a fusion ticket of Republicans and dissident Democrats by just under 45,000 votes, the smallest margin by which he ever won re-election. A joint legislative committee investigated the goings-on in Hudson County; Hague testified before it. The subsequent report showed that Hague had taken advantage of loopholes in the election laws, but the report did not show he had committed any crimes.

By 1930, Hague controlled 5,600 city positions and 1,700 Hudson County jobs. Following his success in the 1933 municipal elections, the Republican county supervisor of elections alleged massive fraud and demanded access to the ballot boxes. He was blocked by an injunction issued by Judge Thomas J. Brogan, former Jersey City corporation counsel, who ruled that the supervisor had no power to inspect the boxes even though no votes had been recorded for the opposition in one district. Several affidavits had been filed by voters saying they had voted for opposition candidates in that district. The new county prosecutor, appointed by Governor Larson, a Republican, attempted to bring charges, but there was conflict with the grand jury which lasted until the prosecutor's term expired in 1934, and he was replaced by Governor Moore (then serving his second term) with a Hague adherent.

In a similar case in 1937, Brogan ruled that though the boxes could be opened, no one had the right to look inside, therefore it was pointless to open the boxes. In that year's gubernatorial election, Moore won over Republican Lester Clee with Hudson County turning an 85,000-vote deficit into a 45,000-vote victory for Moore. This time the Republicans demanded a recount in Hudson County, and it was performed by the county board of elections under Brogan's supervision. Brogan dismissed a petition challenging the outcome. In January, he swore in Moore for a third term.

=== National figure ===
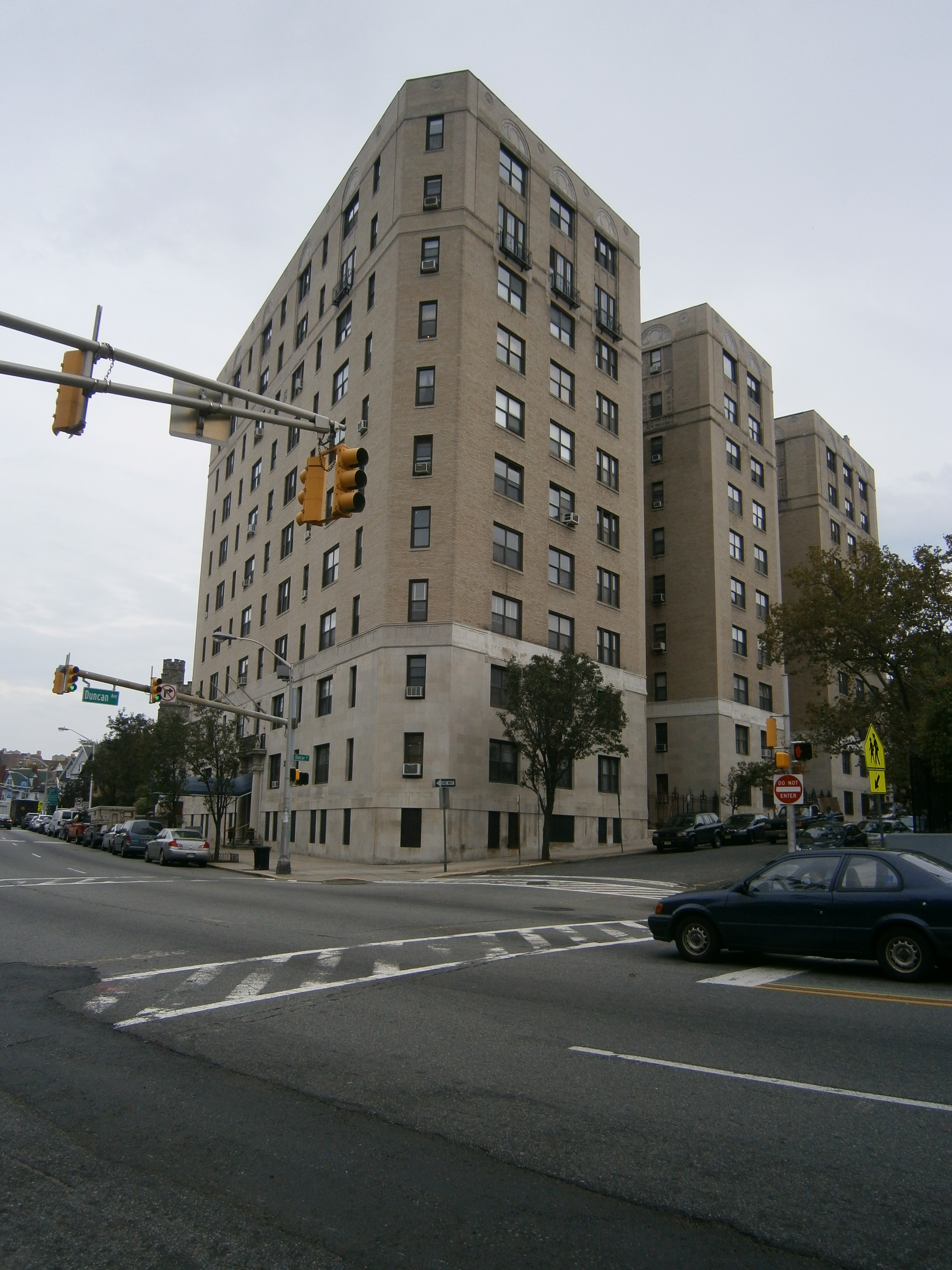
Building at 2600 Hudson (now Kennedy) Boulevard, one of Hague's residences

Hague met the governor of New York, Al Smith, at the 1920 Democratic National Convention. The two quickly formed a close friendship, bonded by similar slum upbringings as Irish-American Catholics at a time when there was much prejudice towards them. In addition to their personal friendship (the Hagues and Smiths often vacationed together), Hague backed Smith for president at the 1924 Democratic National Convention, switching to him after initially backing New Jersey's favorite son, Governor Silzer, but after 103 ballots, the nomination went to former West Virginia representative John W. Davis. Although his candidate was not nominated, the convention made Hague a national figure as he was elected vice chairman of the Democratic National Committee. Nevertheless, Hague could not deliver New Jersey for Davis, as Calvin Coolidge won the state by more than 378,000 votes. Smith was nominated by the Democrats in 1928 for president, but did not win nor take New Jersey. Hague characterized investigations into him that year as an attempt to prevent Smith from winning the state.

In the 1932 United States presidential election, Hague backed Smith against Franklin D. Roosevelt during the race for the Democratic nomination. At the convention Hague alleged that Roosevelt could not win the election and would lose every state east of the Mississippi. Nevertheless, Roosevelt was nominated, and Hague acted quickly to preserve his influence and power in the party. He telephoned Roosevelt's campaign manager, James A. Farley, and offered the New Jersey governor's summer residence in Sea Girt for Roosevelt's campaign kickoff. Farley accepted, and on August 27, 1932, Hague arranged for a crowd of more than 100,000 people, many brought by train, to greet Roosevelt. The nominee stated, "There is no general who could have assembled such a host as my old friend, the mayor of Jersey City", words that were taken as forgiveness of Hague. In November, Roosevelt won the presidency and became the first Democratic candidate since Wilson to win New Jersey, by 31,000 votes, aided by a margin of 118,000 votes from Hudson County.

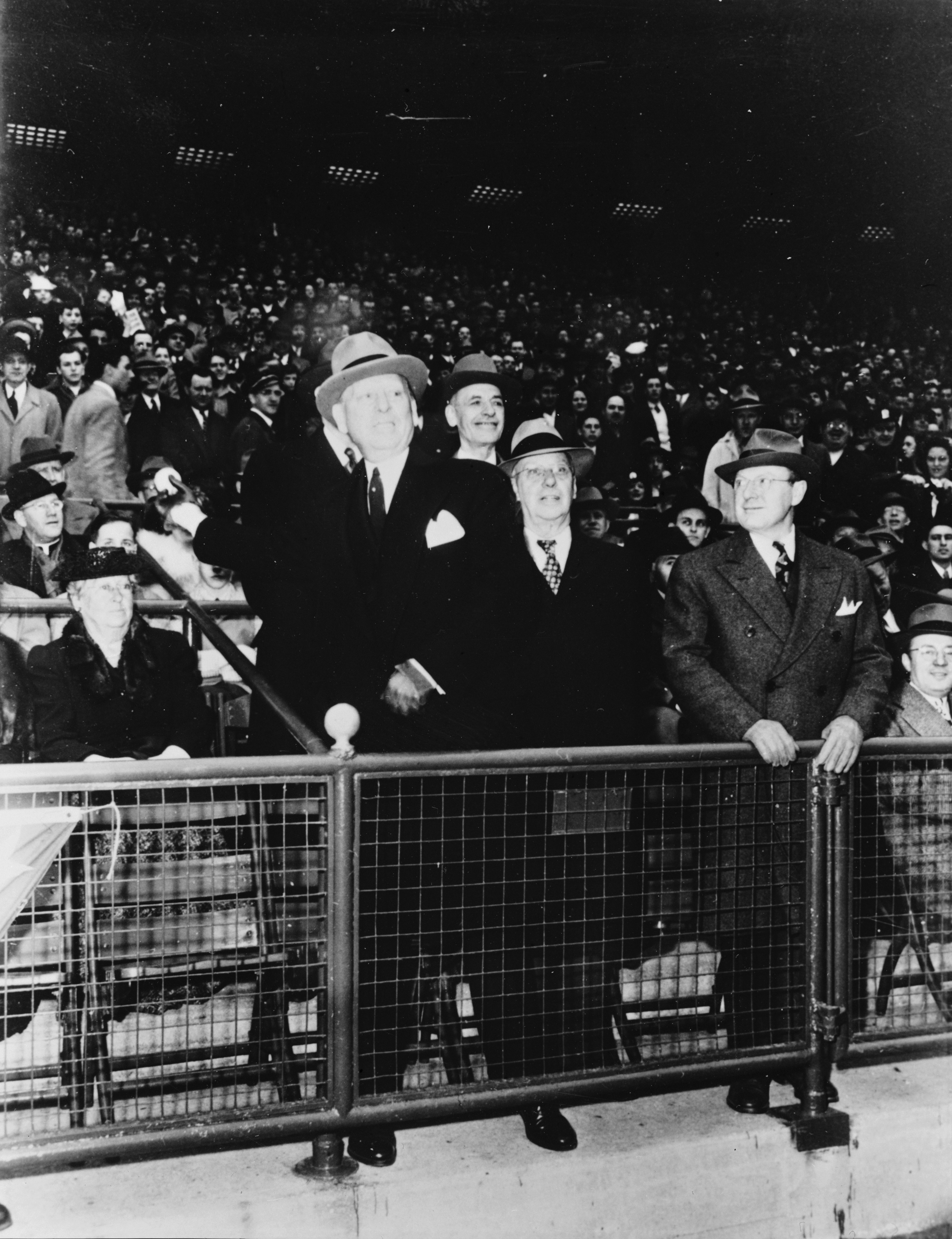
Hague tosses out the first ball at the Jersey City Giants' 1946 home opener, Roosevelt Stadium.

Roosevelt's New Deal program resulted in massive federal payments to the states. In most states these payments went through the governor (especially if a Democrat), but in New Jersey they went through Hague, allowing him to control employment on a large scale. Hague had some years previously opened the Margaret Hague Maternity Hospital; this was greatly added to, becoming the Jersey City Medical Center, which was dedicated by Hague and Roosevelt on October 2, 1936. This at the time was the third largest hospital in the world, and services were provided, for the most part, for free. These funds would also build Jersey City's Roosevelt Stadium, where in 1946, Jackie Robinson broke the color barrier in Organized Baseball.

Roosevelt, a close political ally, was an active protector of Hague. In 1938, for example, Farley, the postmaster general, reported to the president that a Jersey City machine functionary was reading the mail of one of Hague's political enemies. Despite the fact that the person whose mail was opened wanted prosecutions, Hague was not charged. Farley remembered, "We had a hell of a time getting Hague out of that one."

=== Decline and retirement ===
We hear about constitutional rights, free speech and the free press. Every time I hear those words I say to myself, "That man is a Red, that man is a Communist." You never heard a real American talk in that manner.

— Hague
to the Jersey City Chamber of Commerce in 1938

Hague disliked the Committee for Industrial Organization (CIO), in part because he deemed it communistic, and in part because he wanted to give Jersey City a pro-business image. He also viewed it as a threat to his control of the state Democratic Party. In 1937, he decided to ban CIO organizers from the city. Those that defied the ban were beaten and jailed, or deported to New York City. Periodicals that reported on this could not be sold in Jersey City. The city refused all permits for CIO rallies, and no private hall in the city would rent to it. The organization sued, and in 1939 the Supreme Court, in the case of Hague v. Committee for Industrial Organization, ruled against him. According to Fishman, "a landmark ruling from the U.S. Supreme Court was required to extend the First Amendment to Jersey City". Similarly, Hague saw the socialist Norman Thomas as a communist, and city police stood by while Hague partisans disrupted Thomas's speeches, after which Hague banned Thomas from making speeches within the city limits.

Already damaged because of his anti-union activities, Hague's reputation took another blow in 1940 with the publication of Dayton David McKean's book The Boss: The Hague Machine in Action. Although there had been exposés of Hague before, they did little damage and he rather enjoyed the notoriety. McKean's book, prepared with the secret assistance of a Hague enemy, lawyer and future Chief Justice of New Jersey Arthur T. Vanderbilt, was widely reviewed and read. Vanderbilt's goal was to taint Hague in the eyes of Democratic leaders, and according to Johnson, he was successful.

Also in 1940, an anti-Hague Democrat, Charles Edison, was elected as New Jersey's governor. Edison, son of the inventor, had served as Secretary of the Navy in Roosevelt's cabinet, and Roosevelt wanted to replace him. Hague reluctantly agreed to support Edison, and Hudson County turned out in its usual numbers to elect him. Once elected, Edison lost no time in breaking with Hague: One story is that his first act on reaching the governor's office was to rip out the direct line from Hague. Roosevelt took a nuanced stance between them, knowing Hague was likely to be in office once Edison had left his, and he needed Hudson County to win New Jersey. Roosevelt had hoped Edison could wrest control of the Democratic Party from Hague, allowing Roosevelt to win New Jersey while jettisoning the notorious mayor, but was unwilling to aid Edison for fear of angering Hague. According to Lyle W. Dorsett in his essay on Hague, "Roosevelt refused to destroy Hague – which he certainly could have done – because the man who ruled Jersey City politics for nearly half a century was more valuable to the President at the helm of New Jersey’s [Democratic Party] than he was in prison."

In 1943, former governor Walter Edge was returned to office. Edge's attorney general, Walter Van Riper, initiated several investigations of Hague's activities, and tried to diminish Hague's control of law enforcement in Hudson County. Within months, though, a federal grand jury indicted Van Riper, though he was acquitted. According to Vernon, the files indicate that Roosevelt played a part in getting charges brought against Van Riper, which ensured there would be no case against Hague.

Hague's machine continued to weaken as World War II ended. The Irish were increasingly becoming a minority in Jersey City as other groups moved in, and with a greater governmental safety net including Social Security, the citizens were less dependent on Hague's largesse. The mayor preferred to give major patronage positions to fellow Irish, causing resentment in other groups.

Hague's role allowed him to gain wealth well beyond his salary, which never exceeded $7,500, with a fourteen-room duplex in Jersey City's finest apartment building, a mansion on the Jersey Shore, and a rented villa in Florida every winter. Hague was increasingly absent from Jersey City as he aged, spending time on the shore and in Florida. Although the opposition doubled its previous showing, Hague's ticket still dominated the 1945 municipal elections, winning by 50,000 votes.

Edge was hostile to Hague in his second term as governor; his successor, Alfred Driscoll, wooed Hague to achieve the constitutional reform in New Jersey that Hague had long torpedoed, granting him some state-appointed positions. Hague dropped his opposition to the new constitution, which easily passed in 1947. There were signs that Hague's time had passed; the machine in the neighboring city of Hoboken was defeated by a ticket of three Italian-Americans and two Irish.

Hague abruptly announced his retirement on June 4, 1947. However, he was able to have his nephew, Frank Hague Eggers, chosen as his successor. It was generally understood that Hague still held the real power, and he remained deputy chair of the Democratic National Committee. Despite leaving office, Hague generated a huge majority in Hudson County for President Harry Truman in the 1948 presidential election, though it was not enough to win the state. Hague's power in Jersey City ended in 1949 when John V. Kenny, a former Hague ward leader alienated by the appointment of Eggers, put together his own commission ticket, and included a Polish-American and an Italian-American. Kenny's ticket was able to oust the Hague/Eggers ticket from power. Kenny proved unable to successfully deal with the departure of the middle class for suburban homes, and Jersey City became largely impoverished.

== Final years ==
Even after the election of Kenny, Hague remained in control of the county and state Democratic organizations, but his loss of power was shown when he could not carry the state or even Hudson County for the Democrat, Elmer Wene, in the 1949 gubernatorial election, as Driscoll won re-election.

Hague spent his final years in exile from Jersey City, fearing subpoenas. He divided his time between a luxurious apartment in New York City and a mansion on Biscayne Bay in Florida. The last vestige of his power fell in 1952, when he was replaced as vice chair of the Democratic National Committee, and as committee member from New Jersey. Hague died on January 1, 1956, at his duplex apartment in Manhattan, New York City. His body was taken to Jersey City for the funeral. While hundreds gathered to see the casket depart Quinn's funeral home on Academy Street in Jersey City, only four men were seen to remove their hats for the passing of the coffin. One woman present held an American flag and a sign that read: "God have mercy on his sinful, greedy soul." Hague was laid to rest in a large mausoleum at Holy Name Cemetery in Jersey City.

== Techniques ==
Teacher: Who made the Jersey City Police Department?
Pupil: Mayor Hague.
Teacher: Who made the Jersey City Fire Department?
Pupil: Mayor Hague.
Teacher: Who made the world?
Pupil: God made the world.
Chorus of pupils: You dirty Republican!

— A joke current in Hague's day

Hague, trained in the Horseshoe where politics and pageantry intermingled, made each of his political fights, even the small ones, into dramatic battles which he vividly presented to the voters. This also made good newspaper copy, allowing him to dictate much of his public portrayal. For example, The Hudson Observer headlined the 1917 municipal election as "Commissioner Hague's Manly Fight." Prior to each primary or general election, Hague would meet with hundreds of members of his organization and urge them to get out the vote. They responded: in a typical Hudson County election under Hague, 92 percent of eligible individuals were registered voters, among whom there was an 85 percent turnout rate, often making the difference for Democratic candidates between victory statewide and defeat. Hudson County had the most registered voters in the state in 1927, despite being second in population to Essex County per the 1920 census. Dayton David McKean, who wrote a well-researched book hostile to Hague in 1940, deemed Hague's ability to get out almost as many votes to defeat the 1927 constitutional amendment referendum as he did for a gubernatorial election as "almost miraculous ... [it] surpasses comparison, almost belief".

Hague went beyond the standard of many political bosses who were shadowy figures behind the scenes, for he was on the ballot every four years. In a time when there was only a limited social safety net, he provided jobs for his supporters in exchange for votes, acting through his network of neighborhood leaders, male and female. Despite frequent stories of electoral fraud, he perfected techniques of canvassing, getting his base of working class voters, who held Hague in high esteem, to the polls. Amid the Depression, he delivered food to the doors of the poor, and the Jersey City Medical Center provided free health care. The streets were clean and free of crime.

Those wanting to work for Jersey City or Hudson County were expected to repay the favor of their hiring with loyalty, votes, and three percent of their salary to Hague's machine. Suppliers and contractors were expected to kick back ten percent of the value of the contract, and the rackets, such as bookmakers, protected by the Hague organization were also expected to pay. Although a Democrat, Hague had no compunction about making deals with Republicans in the state senate or the governor's mansion to maintain his power.

Hague fostered good relations with various organizations in Jersey City, seeking to make them if not appendages of his own organization, then at least places where dissent could not grow. Principal among these was the Catholic Church, which had 75 percent of the church membership in Jersey City. Political action by clerics was discouraged, and the tendency of the church in Jersey City to divide among parish lines was encouraged. Some assistance was direct–in 1918, Hudson County legislators obtained legislation allowing police and fire precincts to hire chaplains, and this was widely-used in Jersey City. In fact, the county mechanics bureau had three chaplains, one Catholic, one Protestant and one Jewish. After a snowstorm, city employees cleared the snow from Catholic schools without any issue of church-state separation being raised. Protestant clergy were frequent critics of Hague in the 1920s, but his anti-Communist crusade in the 1930s and his tight control of saloons following Prohibition muted that criticism. Hague always included at least one Protestant on his ticket for the city commission.

== Legacy and historical view ==
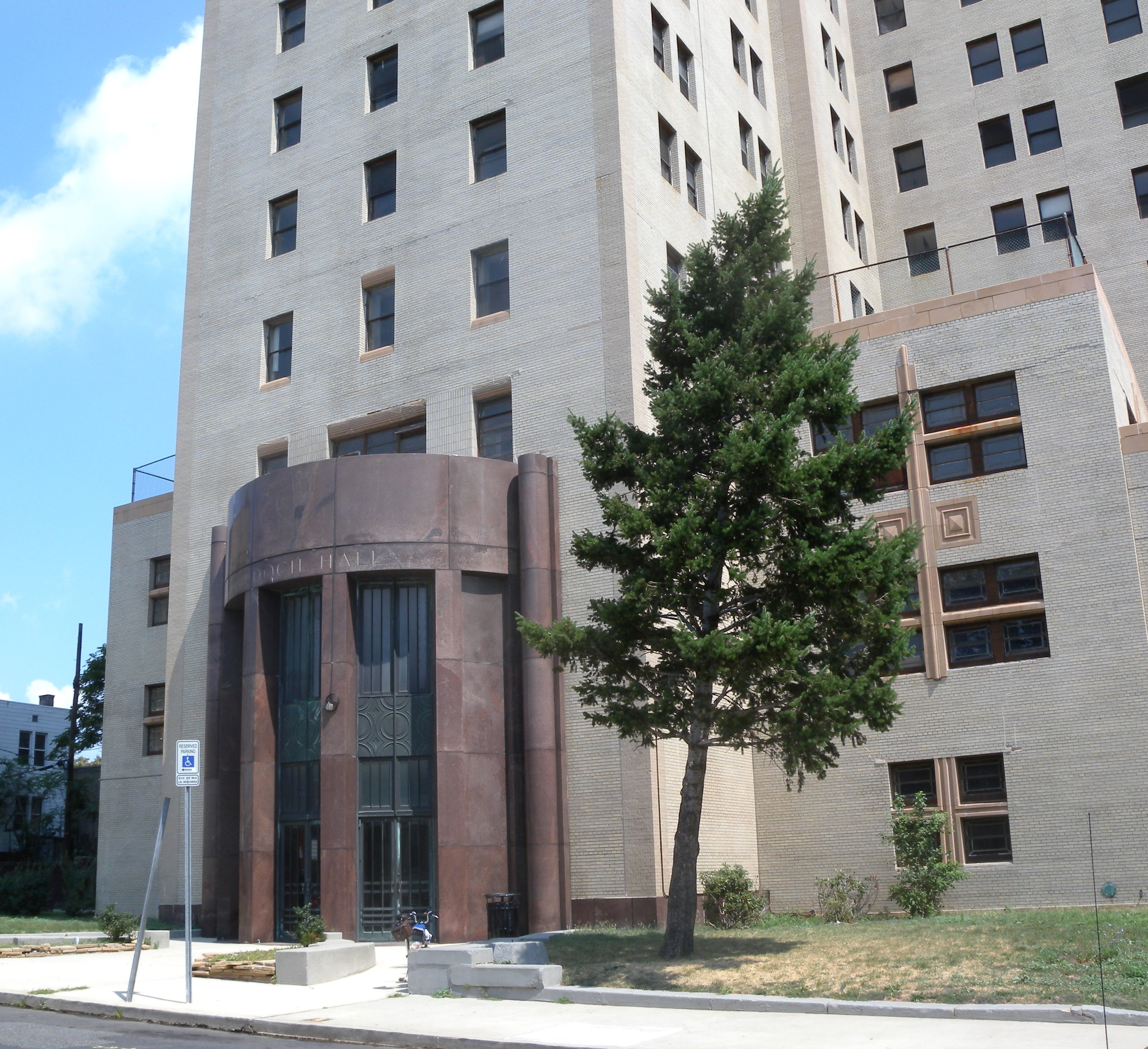
Murdoch Hall, formerly part of the Jersey City Medical Center

Hague served an unequaled 30 years as mayor of Jersey City, seven full terms and part of an eighth. His time as mayor, known as the "Hague Era", is associated with bossism. Hague has often been described as corrupt, something Leonard Vernon, who wrote a 2011 biography of Hague, believed unfair and derived from McKean's earlier book on Hague. Vernon cited as an example Hague's characterization in the HBO series Boardwalk Empire, about 1930s Atlantic City and its Republican boss, Nucky Johnson, in which Hague is seen with a glass in his hand and a woman on his lap, something uncharacteristic of Hague, a lifelong teetotaler about whom there was no hint of extramarital scandal. Vernon believed that McKean's book has done more damage to Hague's reputation than any other work. Nelson Johnson agreed, "No one did more to sully Frank Hague's name in American history than Dayton David McKean. Thanks to McKean's book, Hague's image in twentieth-century urban history is beyond rehabilitation."

Hague is remembered for saying, "Listen, here is the law! I am the law!" William Safire noted that this famous quotation is taken out of context. Hague was trying to allow two boys to go to work, as they wanted, and fulfill their schooling requirements at night school, which he was told by officials was not legal. According to Safire, "but because Mayor Hague was surely an autocratic political boss, the words were taken out of context and used against him. Today, the attempt to help a couple of poor youths is forgotten, and the line is always quoted as the American equivalent to Louis XIV's 'I am the State'."

According to Hart, "In terms of power and longevity, only Chicago mayor Richard J. Daley rates as Hague's peer as a political boss." McKean, writing in 1940, stated, "Even Tammany Hall, the prototype of all machine politics, never dominated New York as Hague and his political associates have dominated Jersey City and Hudson County. Richard J. Connors, in his book on Hague's years in power, believed that Hague fell because he would not put in the same amount of work to keep power as he had to gain it, "The Boss game has its rules. Frank Hague violated too many of them." According to Fleming, "the boldness with which the boss of bosses combined corruption and power became a legacy that continues to haunt New Jersey".

Vernon believed the negative portrayal of Hague by historians to be unjust, or at least incomplete: "History, legend and lore has firmly planted Frank Hague's career in the spectrum of morally gray, and there is no doubt that the placement is an accurate one. But if one is to delve further into this often-used analogy, one must first concede that gray is not a true color, but rather a blend of black and white. The reviewers of Hague's clearly ambiguous legacy have chosen to separate out the two elements and concentrate entirely on the black." According to Matthew Raffety in his journal article on Hague's early career, "It will be impossible for Jersey City to forget the Hague years. The city is dotted with buildings and monuments erected during his mayoralty, including the massive Jersey City Medical Center that continues to dominate the skyline. But just as Jersey City bears the physical legacy of Frank Hague's reign, so too do its politics." According to historian Robert Fishman in the American National Biography entry on Hague:

Dour, ruthless, and dictatorial, Hague lacked the warmth and wit that have endeared other urban bosses to posterity. Formed by the narrow world of his youth, he never grasped the wider forces of social and economic change that were engulfing his city. While the Hague machine dominated local patronage politics, the Port Authority of New York and New Jersey and other agencies were reshaping the whole region, promoting middle-class suburbanization and the highway-based decentralization of industry. Both industry and the white, ethnic middle class fled the high taxes, pervasive corruption, and decaying infrastructure that they saw as the Hague machine's legacy to Jersey City. The city that had "everything for industry" lost its industrial base. Hague's monument, the towers of the Jersey City Medical Center, now stand largely abandoned in the midst of a surreal landscape of urban decay.

== See also ==
- List of mayors of Jersey City, New Jersey
- List of longest-serving United States mayors

== Sources ==
- Connors, Richard (1971). A Cycle of Power: The Career of Jersey City Mayor Frank Hague. Scarecrow Press. ISBN 978-0-8108-0435-7.
- Dorsett, Lyle W. (2010). "Frank Hague, Franklin Roosevelt, and the Politics of the New Deal". In Lurie, Maxine N. (ed.). A New Jersey Anthology. Rutgers University Press. pp. 362–373. ISBN 978-0-8135-4745-9.
- Erie, Steven P. (1988). Rainbow's End: Irish-Americans and the Dilemmas of Urban Machine Politics, 1840–1985. University of California Press. ISBN 978-0-520-07183-4.
- Fleming, Thomas (1984). New Jersey: A History. W.W. Norton. ISBN 978-0-393-30180-9.
- Greenberg, Brian (2012). "The Progressive Era". In Lurie, Maxine N.; Veit., Richard (eds.). New Jersey: A History of the Garden State. Rutgers University Press. pp. 202–235. ISBN 978-0-8135-5409-9.
- Hart, Steven (2007). The Last Three Miles: Politics, Murder, and the Construction of America's First Superhighway. The New Press. ISBN 978-1-59558-098-6.
- Hart, Steven (2013). American Dictators : Frank Hague, Nucky Johnson, and the Perfection of the Urban Political Machine (eBook ed.). Rutgers University Press. ISBN 978-0-8135-6214-8.
- Johnson, Nelson (2014). Battleground New Jersey: Vanderbilt, Hague and Their Fight for Justice. Rutgers University Press. ISBN 978-0-8135-6974-1.
- Leinwand, Gerald (2004). Mackerels in the Moonlight: Four Corrupt American Mayors. McFarland & Company. ISBN 978-0-7864-1845-9.
- McKean, Dayton David (1967) [1940]. The Boss: the Hague Machine in Action. Russell & Russell Publications. ISBN 978-0-8462-0821-1.
- Murray, Joseph M. (Winter 2023). "The Real "Stolen Election": Frank Hague and New Jersey's 1937 Race for Governor". New Jersey Studies. 9 (1): 20–66.
- Piehler, G. Kurt (2012). "Depression and War". In Lurie, Maxine N.; Veit., Richard (eds.). New Jersey: A History of the Garden State. Rutgers University Press. pp. 236–264. ISBN 978-0-8135-5409-9.
- Raffety, Matthew (2009). "Political Ethics and Public Style in the Early Career of Jersey City's Frank Hague". New Jersey History. 124 (1): 29–56. doi:10.14713/njh.v124i1.985.
- Smith, Thomas F.X. (1982). The Powerticians. Lyle Stuart. ISBN 978-0-8184-0328-6.
- Van Devander, Charles W. (1974). The Big Bosses. Arno Press. ISBN 978-0-405-05903-2.
- Vernon, Leonard F. (2011). The Life and Times of Jersey City Mayor Frank Hague: I Am the Law. Arcadia Publishing. ISBN 978-1-61423-175-2.
