= Paul J. Hanly Jr. =

American lawyer (1951–2021)

- Born: Paul James Hanly Jr. April 18, 1951; Jersey City, New Jersey, U.S.
- Died: May 22, 2021 (aged 70)
- Education: Cornell University (BA); University of Cambridge (MA); Georgetown University (JD)
- Occupation: Lawyer
- Relatives: John V. Kenny (grandfather)

Paul James Hanly Jr. (April 18, 1951 – May 22, 2021) was an American lawyer.

== Early life and education ==
Hanly was born in Jersey City on April 18, 1951. His father was a hospital administrator and his mother was a homemaker. His grandfather, John V. Kenny, was a mayor of Jersey City.

Hanly attended Cornell University and graduated with a Bachelor of Arts degree in philosophy in 1974. Later, he got a Master of Arts from Cambridge University in 1976 and a Juris Doctor from Georgetown University in 1979. He clerked for Lawrence Aloysius Whipple in New Jersey after graduation.

== Career ==
Hanly started his career as a trial counsel for Turner & Newall.

In 2002, Hanly founded a law firm, Hanly Conroy with Jayne Conroy. Later, he became a partner of a law firm, Hanly Conroy Bierstein Sheridan Fisher & Hayes. Hanly Conroy merged with Simmons Browder Gianaris Angelides & Barnerd of Alton, IL to form what is known today as Simmons Hanly Conroy, LLC.

Hanly was a lead counsel of a major litigation against opioid-related companies. In another case, the victims of sexual assault at a church-run school in Haiti were represented by Hanly in their successful 2019 settlement claim for $60 million.
