= Nelson Johnson =

American lawyer, judge and author (born 1948)

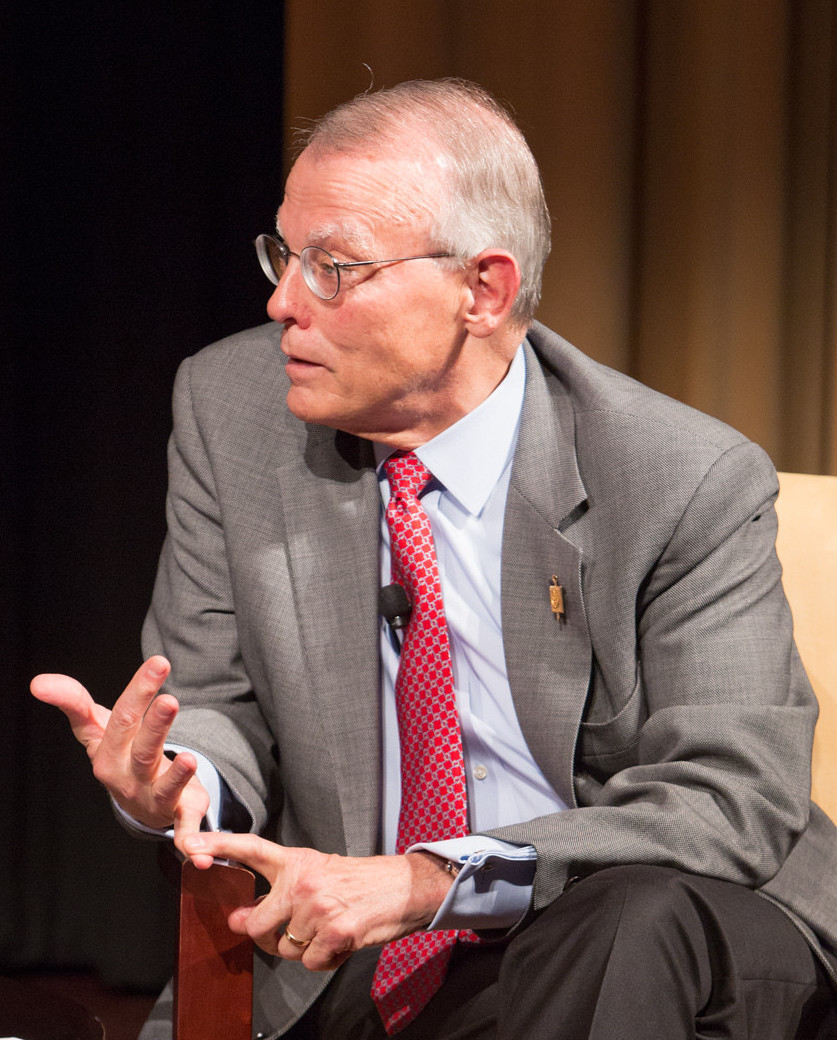
- Born: Nelson Clarence Johnson; 1948 (age 77–78); Hammonton, New Jersey, U.S.
- Education: St. John's University (BS); Villanova University (JD)
- Occupations: Lawyer, author
- Known for: Boardwalk Empire: The Birth, High Times and Corruption of Atlantic City

Nelson C. Johnson (born 1948) is an American author and former judge, lawyer and historian, best known for his 2002 New York Times bestseller, Boardwalk Empire: The Birth, High Times, and Corruption of Atlantic City. His book served as the basis for the popular and Emmy Award-winning HBO period political crime drama TV series Boardwalk Empire.

== Early life ==
Born in 1948, Johnson is a life-long resident of Hammonton, New Jersey, a small town in the southern part of the state.

He attended St. John's University where he earned a bachelor's degree in political science. He also went on to earn a JD from the law school of Villanova University. He served in the Air National Guard for a year after college.

== Legal career ==
Johnson was admitted to the New Jersey Bar in 1974.

He was elected to the board of education of the Hammonton Public Schools in 1972. From 1975 to 1980, Johnson was elected as a Democrat to the Atlantic County Board of Chosen Freeholders, and he was a candidate for the New Jersey General Assembly in 1979. He represented the Atlantic City Planning Board in the early 1980s. Over the course of his legal career, Johnson also represented the Press of Atlantic City, K. Hovnanian, Renault Winery, Ole Hansen & Sons, the Hamilton Township Planning Board, the Mullica Township Planning Board, and the Greater Atlantic City Hotel-Motel Association. Johnson became a partner in Johnson & Bertman. In explaining his motivation to write Boardwalk Empire, Johnson explained "[City Hall] was dysfunctional and corrupt. I thought, in order to do my job here, I have to find out how it got this way. I didn't set out to write a book. I just wanted a better understanding." His research eventually encompassed many aspects of old Atlantic City: "The history was fascinating. Miss America, the Monopoly board, casino gambling, the ocean, the Boardwalk...Nucky was just the most interesting part of it, though. I don't think there was anyone in the 20th century who wore both hats—organized crime and the Republican Party. He was able to cross back and forth between those two worlds."

In 2006, Johnson was appointed to serve as a New Jersey Superior Court judge for Cape May and Atlantic counties. He presided over more than 200 jury trials. Johnson retired from his position as a New Jersey Superior Court Judge in September 2018 at the mandatory retirement age of 70.

As of 2023, Johnson serves "as 'of Counsel' at the law firm of Hankin, Sandman, Palladino, Weintrob & Bell, P.C., in Atlantic City. His practice is limited to mediation and arbitration of commercial litigation, general equity matters, and other civil disputes generally filed in the Law and Chancery Divisions, as well as federal court, excluding claims arising out of automobile accidents."

== Writing career ==
Nelson's 2002 book Boardwalk Empire was the basis for the HBO drama series Boardwalk Empire. Terence Winter, the show runner of Boardwalk Empire, described the book as "the history of Atlantic City from when it was literally a mosquito-infested swamp until the present day." Its sequel is The Northside: African Americans and the Creation of Atlantic City. During Johnson's historical research for Boardwalk Empire he surfaced "the indispensable nature of the black community. If you remove the black experience from Atlantic City’s history the town never even comes to exist. Ninety-five percent of the hotel workforce from 1880 to 1930 was African American. Pull them out of the picture and what do you have?" In 2010, Nelson was asked by the New Jersey State Superior Court to cease promoting the book and the series in order to preserve the ethical neutrality of his position as a judge.

His third book, published by Rutgers University Press, is Battleground New Jersey: Vanderbilt, Hague and Their Fight for Justice, and is about Jersey City Mayor Frank Hague and Arthur T. Vanderbilt, first chief justice of New Jersey's modern Supreme Court.

His interest in Clarence Darrow, subject of his fourth book, dates to childhood, when "my mother introduced me to Darrow for the Defense by Irving Stone."

== Selected works ==
- Boardwalk Empire: The Birth, High Times, and Corruption of Atlantic City. Fall River Press. 2002. ISBN 9781435158528.
- The Northside: African Americans and the Creation of Atlantic City. Medford, New Jersey: Plexus Publishing. 2011. ISBN 9780937548738. OCLC 666616382.
- Lieberman, Stuart J.; Johnson, Nelson; Hoens, Helen; Chen, Ronald K.; Walsh, Kevin D.; Williams, Robert F. (2014). What Every Attorney Should Know about the New Jersey Constitution. New Brunswick, N.J.: New Jersey Institute for Continuing Legal Education. OCLC 1128146582.
- Battleground New Jersey: Vanderbilt, Hague and Their Fight for Justice. New Brunswick, New Jersey: Rutgers University Press. 2014. ISBN 9780813569727. OCLC 870248710.
- Darrow's Nightmare: The Forgotten Story of America's Most Famous Lawyer. New York: RosettaBooks. 2021. ISBN 9781948122733. OCLC 1164355585.
- Style & Persuasion: A Handbook for Lawyers. New Jersey State Bar Association (NJSBA). 2023. ISBN 979-8218188429. OCLC 1407313466.
