= History of the New Jersey State Constitution =

Originally, the state of New Jersey was a single British colony, the Province of New Jersey. After the English Civil War, Charles II assigned New Jersey as a proprietary colony to be held jointly by Sir George Carteret and John Berkeley, 1st Baron Berkeley of Stratton. Eventually, the collection of land fees, or quit-rents, from colonists proved inadequate for colonial profitability. Sir George Carteret sold his share of the colony to the Quakers in 1673. Following the sale, the land was divided into East and West Jersey. In 1681, West Jersey adopted a constitution. In 1683, East Jersey adopted one as well. In 1702, the colonies were united again under Anne, Queen of Great Britain, and adopted a constitution in 1776.

New Jersey has been governed under the authority of several constitutional documents. As a colony, the first, the Concession and Agreement (1665), was written by the colony's Lords Proprietors, Sir George Carteret and John Berkeley, 1st Baron Berkeley of Stratton, which offered broad provisions for religious freedom. After the interests of Lord Berkeley and Carteret were sold to investors, New Jersey was divided into two distinct proprietary colonies West Jersey, and East Jersey each with their own constitutions enacted in 1681 and 1683 respectively. The proprietors were compelled to cede their political authority to the Crown, and both colonies were reunited in 1702 as a Crown colony under the direct command of Queen Anne.

At the onset of the American Revolution, New Jersey was governed by waning British colonial authority. William Franklin, the province's last royal governor before the American Revolution (1775–83), was marginalized in the last year of his tenure, as the province was run de facto by the Provincial Congress of New Jersey. Franklin considered the Provincial Congress to be an "illegal assembly" and attempted to reassert royal authority. In June 1776, the Provincial Congress formally deposed Franklin and had him arrested, adopted its first state constitution on July 2, 1776, and reorganized the province into an independent state. The newly formed State of New Jersey elected William Livingston as its first governor on August 31, 1776—a position he would be reelected to until his death in 1790.

William Franklin and his father, the founding father Benjamin Franklin, were on opposite sides of the Revolution. William's British-educated wife Elizabeth pleaded for Benjamin's help after William's arrest. They went unheeded.

[William Franklin] died in exile in the England he had always honored and loved. .....he was an outsider in the land he had chosen to call his own.

While New Jersey was in a state of war, delegates of the Provincial Congress drafted the first constitution in a span of five days and ratified it only two days later. Its primary objective was to provide a basic governmental framework that would assume control of the territory after the collapse of royal authority and maintain civil order. This constitution served as the charter document for the State's government for the next 68 years. Among its provisions, the document granted suffrage rights to unmarried women and African-Americans who met the requirements of possessing sufficient assets or property as "freeholders". The legislature was elected each year and selected the state's governor. It did not specify an amendment procedure and had to be replaced entirely in a constitutional convention. The suffrage rights in the 1776 constitution were limited by the state legislature in 1807 to restrict voting rights to white male citizens who paid taxes. Women who voted in earlier elections tended to support the Federalist Party, and this effort was largely an effort of the Democratic-Republican Party's attempt to unify its factions for the 1808 presidential election.

The State Constitution of 1776 fixed the terms of office for Representative, Senators, and Governors at one year. There was no mention of an Office of Councillor. The right to vote for House electors or for Legislative Council required person wealth of 50 pounds as well as freedom from debt. The right to be a candidate for the House or for the Legislative Council required required personal and real estate wealth of 500 pounds. Moreover, the governor was elected by joint ballot of both chambers of the legislature, and the Legislative Council had the role of Executive Council as well.

New Jersey is governed under a constitution that was enacted in 1947 during a convention held at Rutgers University's College Avenue Gymnasium in New Brunswick, New Jersey. Much of the political structure of the 1844 constitution was carried into the 1947 document. The governor, elected by the people, was elected for a four-year term instead of a three-year term.

== Colonial period ==
=== Concession and Agreement (1664) ===
The Concession and Agreement of the Lords Proprietors of the Province of New Caesarea, or New Jersey, to and With All and Every the Adventurers and All Such as Shall Settle or Plant There, known simply as the Concession and Agreement, was a legal document that guaranteed rights; including, but not only, religious freedom.

Although the document is most commonly recognized as an enticement for settlers, it is in the basic form of any colonial charter or constitution, and guarantees such rights. The document was issued as a proclamation of Lord John Berkeley and Sir George Carteret.

=== West Jersey Constitution ===
In 1681, West Jersey adopted a constitution.

=== East Jersey Constitution ===
See footnote

The constitution of East Jersey, unlike West Jersey's, did not seemingly have a section of the traditional colonial constitution missing. Within their constitution was a detailed creation of a great Council, who would control the colony. The constitution also created a somewhat abbreviated enumeration of rights. The constitution also bans the admission of any non-Christian into the council. A vestige from the Stamp Act, Article XVIII is an archaic section of a since-repealed act.

== Constitution of 1776 ==
=== Initial Drafting ===
New Jersey was located between the British garrison in New York City and the de facto rebel capital in Philadelphia. It thereby became the contested middle ground and consequently one of the chief military theaters of the Revolutionary War. Thus military concerns frequently intruded into daily life.

New Jersey's first state constitution was adopted on October 31, 1776. The American Revolutionary War was underway and George Washington had recently been defeated in New York, putting New Jersey in imminent danger of invasion. With Patriot and Tory factions plotting and battling each other, New Jersey was a state at war and was nearly a state at civil war. Composed in a span of five days at the end of June and ratified just two days later on July 2, 1776, the first New Jersey State Constitution reflected the turbulence and uncertainty of the moment. Its primary objective was to provide a basic governmental framework and preempt New Jersey's fall into anarchy. And yet despite being conceived in a state of military emergency, this Constitution was durable enough to serve as the charter document for the State government for the next 68 years.

The Constitution espoused the republican tone that sovereignty was the people creating a government whose purpose was to provide for their "Happiness, Safety, and Well-Being." ––

=== Vote not limited by race or gender ===
A notable aspect of this original 1776 New Jersey State Constitution is that it provisioned suffrage to citizens without regard to gender or race. New Jersey stood alone among the original thirteen states of the Revolutionary period in excluding these distinctions. As set out in its defining constitutional document, only three provisos restricted those claiming the vote: (i) being of "full age", (ii) having attained a threshold level of wealth, and (iii) having residence within a county during the year prior to an election. Section IV of this original State of New Jersey Constitution captures these ideas in its single sentence:

That all inhabitants of this Colony, of full age, who are worth fifty pounds proclamation money, clear estate in the same, and have resided within the county in which they claim a vote for twelve months immediately preceding the election, shall be entitled to vote for Representatives in Council and Assembly; and also for all other public officers, that shall be elected by the people of the county at large.

"Inhabitants" was a gender and race neutral word whose use allowed unmarried women, immigrants, and freed Blacks to vote, as well as white males.

There is evidence that the clause which permitted unmarried adult women to vote was purposefully written, thereby placing the constitution on the cutting edge of enabling female citizenship. It could in fact be viewed as repayment for the willingness of women to share in the burden of the Revolutionary War with the men.

The New Jersey legislature did amend this constitution on September 20, 1777, by substituting the words " State " and " States " for " colony " and " colonies."

=== Women's Right Clarified in 1797 ===
Some have argued that New Jersey's gender-neutral language was a mistake, but most historians agree that the clear intention was to allow some women and African Americans to vote.

The minimum property requirement would have meant that some married women would be regarded differently than single women.

Although common laws of Coverture enforced in some areas prevented even married women who had sufficient property from holding it their own name or as joint property in the way needed to meet that requirement for voting, coverture was not universally applied. Also some couples might have been exercising civil disobedience of the laws of coverture and the women would have voted pursuant to this open stance of verbalized objection to the law.

Large numbers of single women did regularly participate in elections and spoke out on political issues in New Jersey in the 1790s and 1800s.

If there were any lingering doubts about their intentions, the passage of New Jersey's 1797 voting law—which introduced the phrase "he or she" in reference to voters—erased them and clarified for all that the right to vote across the state was for both men and women. The Act—passed by the New Jersey Assembly on February 22, 1797—was called "An Act to regulate the Election of Members of the Legislative-Council and the General Assembly, Sheriffs and Coroners, in this State" and it revised the regulations for the election of public officials. The law specifically included women in the franchise. Section XI of the Act stated:

And be it enacted, That every voter shall openly, and in full view deliver his or her ballot (which shall be a single written ticket, containing the names of the person or persons for whom he or she votes) to the said judge, or either of the inspectors, who, on receipt thereof, shall, with an audible voice, pronounce the name of such voter, and if no objection is made to the voter, put the ballot immediately into the election box, and the clerk of the election shall thereupon take down the name of such voter in a book or poll list, to be provided for the purpose.

=== Vote Rescinded for Women, non-Whites ===
Between 1797 and 1807 women voted in large numbers in New Jersey. But in 1807 the state's legislature ignored the constitution and restricted suffrage to white male citizens who paid taxes. This was largely a result of the Democratic-Republican Party's attempt to unify its factions for the 1808 presidential election. A faction within the party wanted to deny the vote to aliens and the non-tax-paying poor. The liberal faction within the party gave way on this, but also took the vote from women, who tended to vote for the Federalists.

New Jersey made scant use of slaves in its battle for freedom from the British Monarchy, often due to vile racism. Moreover, there was generally a lack of recognition for those who had fought for the Patriots. Consequently, it was not surprising the non-white suffrage would be rescinded.

New Jersey's 30-year experiment with female suffrage ended not mainly because of open opposition to the idea of women voting, but as a casualty of party politics and backroom bartering. Another factor was the renewed push by some groups to reinforce the importance of women in the home—and out of the public realm. It also did not help that in the intervening decades no other state had followed New Jersey's more progressive voting approach. Some historians have viewed the New Jersey episode as evidence that the founders entertained the possibility that women could have political rights. The emphasis on liberty and natural rights in the Revolutionary period brought previously excluded groups into the political process. For example, women took the lead in organizing boycotts of British goods in the disputes over colonial rights that led to the Revolution. The writers of New Jersey's 1776 constitution took the natural rights sentiment further than other states were willing to go. But by 1807, the Revolutionary era had passed and Revolutionary fervor was a dimming memory. New Jersey therefore succumbed and fell in line with the practice of the other states.

== Constitution of 1844 ==
The 2nd constitution was adopted on June 29, 1844. Among its provisions was a distinct separation of powers into three branches (executive, legislative and judicial branches), limiting the right to vote to white males, and granted the people (as opposed to the legislature) the right of a popular election for the state's governor. The document limited the state government's ability to accumulate public debt.

== Constitution of 1947 ==
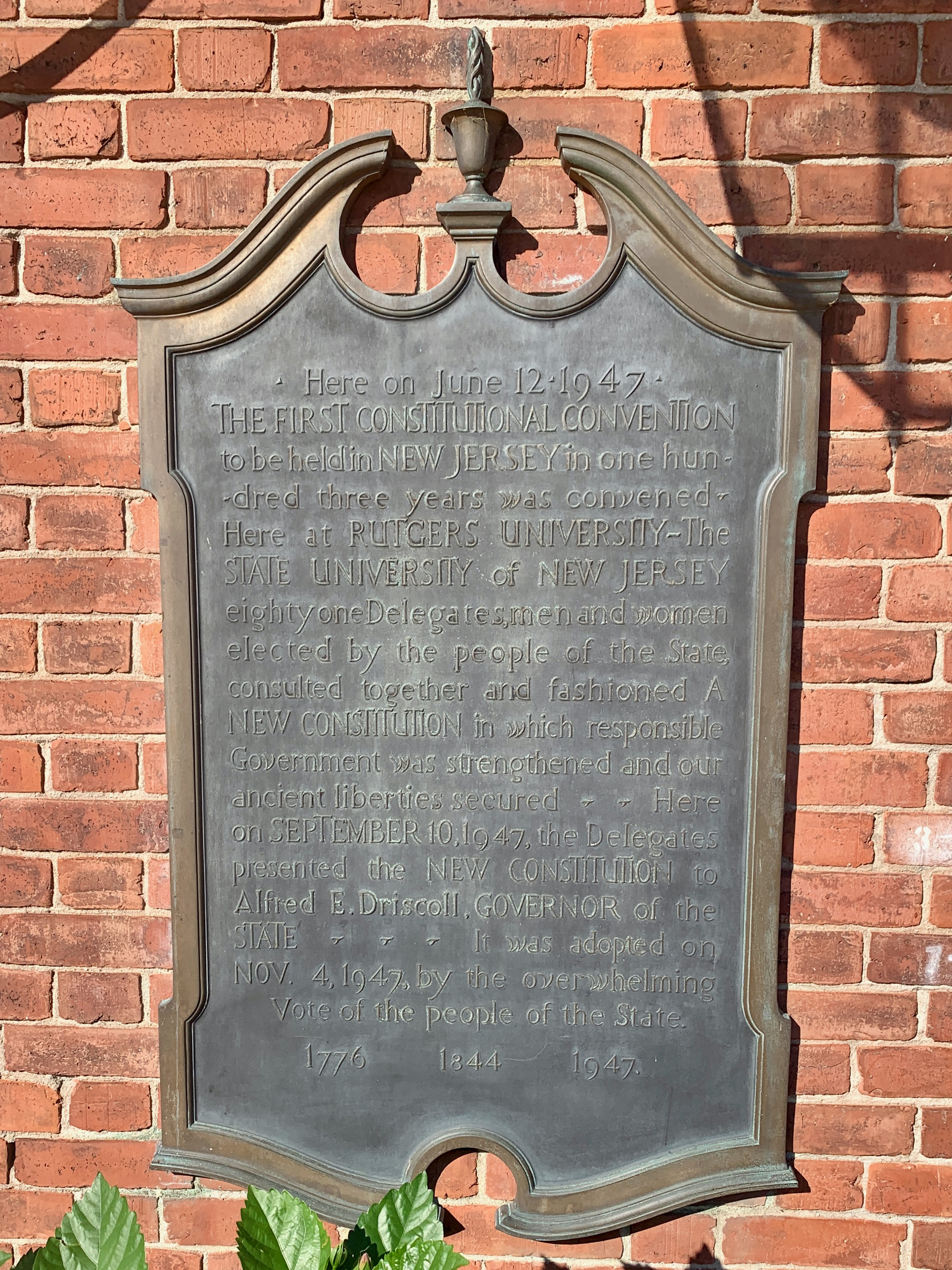
Plaque describing 1947 constitutional convention

=== Drafting ===
The Constitutional Convention that drafted the state's 1947 constitution met at the College Avenue Gymnasium of Rutgers University in New Brunswick.

=== Subsequent amendments ===
Another constitutional convention was held at the Rutgers University campus to rectify the apportionment of legislative districts after the US Supreme Court invalidated the state's scheme for electing state senators geographically by county boundaries instead of population as violative of the "one-man, one-vote" doctrine embodied in the Federal Constitution's 14th Amendment Equal Protection Clause. This was compelled in the wake of court decisions in Baker v. Carr (1962) 369 U.S. 186 and Reynolds v. Simms, 377 U.S. 533 (1964). A constitutional convention held in 1966 created a state legislature with 40 coterminous legislative districts represented by one state senator and two state assemblymen.

In 2005, the constitution was amended to create the post of Lieutenant Governor, and to alter the order of succession in the event the governor's office was vacated. The resignation of two governors in 2001 and 2004 led to the state being led by several acting governor who simultaneously served as the President of the State Senate. The issues regarding the separation of executive and legislative powers, and other concerns created a political controversy where public and media pressure sought a permanent solution to this problem which was inherited from previous state and colonial constitutions and political conventions.

== See also ==
- New Jersey's 1927 biannual elections proposal, an unsuccessful attempt to amend the 1844 constitution.
