= 1927 New Jersey Amendment 4 =

Attempt to extend terms of offices

Proposed amendment #4, special constitutional amendment election, September 20, 1927
- Amends Constitution: General Assembly to consist of members elected biannually. Increases terms of members of the General Assembly to two years, and of the Senate and governor from three to four years, with election for the governor to take place in a presidential election year. Legislature to meet every two years, with special sessions to be called by legislative leaders.
- Outcome: Defeated

Results
Choice	Votes	%
Yes	153,960	41.20%
No	219,749	58.80%
Valid votes	373,709	98.65%
Invalid or blank votes	5,107	1.35%
Total votes	378,816	100.00%
Registered voters/turnout	1,220,485	31.04%
County results
For
70–80%
60–70%
50–60%
Against
70–80%
60–70%
50–60%
- Source: Published results by the State of New Jersey

An unsuccessful attempt was made to pass an amendment to the Constitution of New Jersey in 1926 and 1927. The intent of the amendment was to have members of the New Jersey General Assembly serve two-year terms instead of one and lengthen the terms of state senators and the governor from three years to four. The proposed amendment was passed twice by the legislature, and the text was approved by the attorney general. Before the proposal could be put before the voters for final approval, it was noticed that although the legislature had intended that Assembly members be elected biennially (once in two years), the proposed amendment provided that they were to be chosen "biannually", meaning they were to be elected twice a year. After this discovery, the legislature passed a resolution defining "biannually" to mean "biennially", and proceeded with the referendum. On September 20, 1927, the people of New Jersey voted down the proposal, and Assembly members were elected annually until New Jersey instituted a new constitution in 1947.

New Jersey was governed at the time under a constitution adopted in 1844, and votes to amend it were allowed only once in five years. Among the amendments proposed initially by the 1926 legislature, and passed again in 1927, was one known as the "term extender", which would lengthen the terms of legislators and the governor. It would also require the gubernatorial election to be in the same year as the presidential election. New Jersey, despite being strongly Republican, had elected several Democratic governors recently, and Democrats believed such a change would give the Republicans an advantage. However, the Republican majority in the legislature meant Democrats could not block passage there. The original version, passed by the Assembly in 1926, did not mention "biannually", but the version passed by the Senate and then accepted by the Assembly did use the word. After the revised proposed amendment passed the 1927 legislature, a vote was set for September 27, 1927.

When Jewish organizations protested that September 27 was Rosh Hashanah that year, Governor A. Harry Moore convened the legislature into special session to set a new date. A Democratic clerk then pointed out the meaning of biannually, and others of that party urged that the amendment be scuttled. Instead, the Republican majority, relying on authorities who stated that biannually and biennially meant the same thing, chose to pass a resolution stating that the intent was to have elections every other year and set the referendum date for September 20, 1927. There was considerable amusement at the situation, both in New Jersey and nationwide. Frank Hague, the Jersey City Mayor and Democratic political boss of Hudson County, campaigned against the provision moving the election for governor to the presidential year, alleging it was political manipulation and the mixture of state and federal politics. Republicans stated that having the larger number of voters who cast ballots for president also help choose the governor was a good thing. The Democrats were so against the proposal that they successfully opposed three of the other four amendments that were on the ballot at the same time, lest the term extender amendment pass through confusion. The term extender failed with just over 41 percent in favor, defeated by a huge turnout in Hague's Hudson County bailiwick, which voted overwhelmingly against the proposal, contrasted with light turnout and lukewarm support through the rest of the state.

== Background ==
New Jersey's 1776 constitution was rewritten in 1844. That document, which remained in force until 1947, provided for annual elections for the New Jersey General Assembly, the lower house of the legislature, and for three-year terms for members of the state Senate. The governor of New Jersey was also to serve a three-year term.

To amend the constitution, each house of the legislature would have to pass a proposed amendment in successive years, which would put the proposed amendment on the ballot to be approved or rejected by the people. There could be votes on amendments to the constitution only once in five years. Before 1927, the voters of New Jersey had six times been called upon to decide whether to amend the 1844 constitution, most recently in 1915, but they had done so only in 1875 and 1897. In 1915, amendments to guarantee women the vote, permit excess condemnation (the power to acquire by eminent domain more land than actually needed for a public purpose) by cities and counties, and remove the prohibition on amending the constitution more often than once in five years had each been voted down by a comfortable margin. An amendment to increase the terms of the legislature and governor had been voted down in 1909. In the first quarter of the 20th century, three governors of New Jersey, including Woodrow Wilson, advocated a constitutional convention to thoroughly revise the state constitution, but legislative commissions that considered the question in the early 1920s did not agree, and the constitution continued in force.

== 1926 passage ==
Beginning in February 1926, the legislature's joint Republican conference committee, which steered policy for that majority party in the legislature, began to consider a constitutional amendment to increase the terms of Assembly members to two years, and of senators to four years; the legislature would meet every two years instead of annually. The term of the governor would also be increased to four years, and election to that office scheduled to be at the same time as the election for U.S. president. This was seen as political to benefit the state's Republicans, who generally had greater strength in presidential election years, whereas the Democrats did better in off-year elections. Democrats had won the three most recent gubernatorial elections, with the Republicans last winning in 1916, a presidential election year. No Democratic presidential candidate had won the state with a majority of the vote since Grover Cleveland in 1892, though Wilson had won the state in his 1912 presidential run with fewer votes than William Howard Taft and Theodore Roosevelt combined. Calvin Coolidge had won New Jersey by a margin of 378,000 votes in 1924, but the following year, Democrat A. Harry Moore had been elected governor by 39,000 votes.

The passage by the legislature in March 1926 of a proposed constitutional amendment allowing it to enact laws permitting municipalities to pass zoning regulations caused Republican leaders to again consider what other amendments should be proposed to the voters. These included the various term-extending provisions. The efforts to pass a zoning amendment followed the New Jersey Supreme Court striking down a zoning ordinance as violative of the right of landowners to use their property. The 1925 legislature had passed amendments concerning zoning, and to have the legislature meet every two years instead of one, but these were not passed again by the 1926 legislature, as was necessary for them to be submitted to the voters. Republicans had, in their 1925 state platform, called for amendments regarding zoning and the extension of the terms of legislators and the governor.

Several amendments, sponsored by Assemblyman Clifford R. Powell of Burlington County, a Republican, were passed by the General Assembly on March 24, 1926. First, the provision for biennial sessions of the legislature passed by a vote of 54–0, and one requiring legislative elections to take place every other year, with the legislature to convene the following January, passed by 44–7. Then, an amendment that required, among other things, "The General Assembly shall be composed of members elected by the legal voters of the counties", passed the Assembly by 43–11. The provisions altering the terms of the senators passed by 44–11, as did the provision extending the governor's term. These amendments were subsequently considered by the Senate as a single package for fear some would pass and some would not, resulting in "a jumble".

The term-extending provisions were scheduled in the Senate for the portion of the session intended for bills vetoed by the governor, to begin March 31, 1926. Debate on another proposed constitutional change, to allow amendments to be voted on at a general election rather than at a special election, took place on April 2, but some senators wanted more time to consider the various amendments, and all were postponed until June 22. Distracted by a dispute over who should be the state treasurer, on June 29, the Senate adjourned until July 7, having not acted on the proposed constitutional amendments.

Late on the evening of July 19, just prior to adjourning until November, the Senate passed the term-extending provisions. The amendment that passed had been sponsored by Senator Henry A. Williams of Passaic County and was a substitute for a version prepared by a Senate committee. It provided that "the General Assembly shall be composed of members biannually elected by the legal voters of the counties". (Note: The 1844 constitution stated that "the General Assembly shall be composed of members annually elected by the legal voters of the counties". See Boyd, p. 170.) The text had been approved by Attorney General of New Jersey Edward L. Katzenbach. The proposal also would allow the Speaker of the Assembly and President of the Senate, acting together, to call a special session of the Legislature, which would allow Republican legislators to bypass a Democratic governor. It passed the Senate by a vote of 16–2.

Since the Senate had amended the proposals, they returned to the Assembly, where, also on July 19, the majority leader, Anthony J. Siracusa Jr. (R-Atlantic County) moved to suspend the rules in order to consider them. This being allowed, the package passed by a vote of 34–0. A total of eight proposals (counting the term extenders as a single amendment) passed the legislature for the first time in 1926, including two proposals dealing with zoning. The second proposal was necessary because although the first zoning proposal had passed both houses of the legislature, the General Assembly had neglected to print it verbatim in its legislative journal, as required by the constitution.

== 1927 passage ==
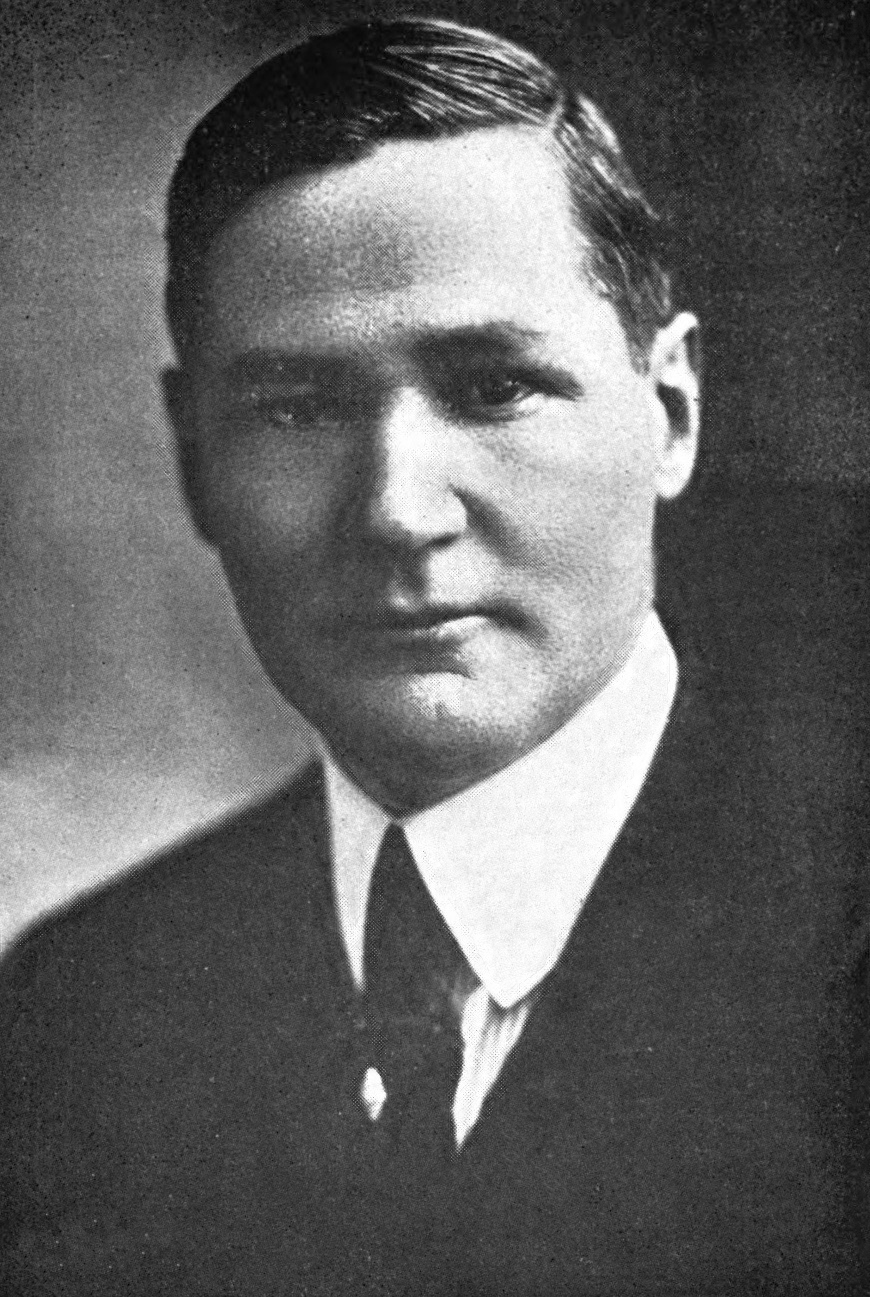
Governor A. Harry Moore of New Jersey

In his annual message on January 11, 1927, Governor Moore stated his support for a constitutional convention to revise New Jersey's governing document. He opposed, though, the lengthening of the gubernatorial term and having the governor elected at the same time as the president, describing the effort to confuse state with national politics as vicious. Senate President Francis B. Davis (R-Gloucester County), in a speech after his election as presiding officer, pledged that the proposed constitutional amendments "must have our best thought and be thoroughly considered before submission to the people".

Powell introduced the term-extender amendment in the Assembly on January 24, 1927, and it was reported from committee and given a second reading in the General Assembly in early February. It passed the Assembly on February 7 on a vote of 47–12, along party lines. Morris E. Barison of Hudson County, the minority leader, stated to the Republican majority, "you cannot elect a governor in the off years and so you have adopted this means. But let me say the battle is only beginning. Get ready for a real fight."

The amendment was reported from committee in the Senate on February 15, 1927. It passed 13–2 on February 22, with two of the Senate's four Democrats opposing (the other two were absent), On March 25, both houses of the legislature passed legislation to set a special election for September 27, 1927, to consider the proposed constitutional amendments, and this was enacted into law on March 31. There were continued reports of Democratic opposition to the amendment, spearheaded by the powerful Hudson County political boss, Mayor Frank Hague of Jersey City.

== Discovery and reaction ==
Considering the words biannual and biennial solely from the linguistic point of view, it would seem somebody has been trying to make a mountain out of a very small mole-hill, for both biannual and biennial mean "occurring or appearing every two years". The words have been used also to signify what is correctly expressed by semiannual, that is, "occurring twice a year". Biannual plants which we speak of more commonly today as biennials were spoken of as bisannual plants two hundred years ago. Then, in course of time, the genius of language brought about the suppression of the s, but the term was formed from the Latin bis, "twice", and annalis, "lasting for one year", ultimately from the Latin annus, "year" [...] In the sense of half yearly, biannual has been in use in the language for more than fifty years [...] but, the word has been used as the equivalent of biennial for as long.

— Dr. Frank A. Vizetelly

On April 5, 1927, it was reported in The Morning Call of Paterson that Jewish organizations were protesting against the election date, as September 27 was Rosh Hashanah (the Jewish New Year and one of the High Holidays) in 1927. This would prevent many Jews from voting. The same day, Governor Moore announced he would meet with legislative leaders and fix a date for a special session of the legislature to change the law setting September 27 as the date the people would vote on the five constitutional amendment proposals. On April 11, Moore called the legislature into special session on April 14, to consider such a change, and to pass on the addition of two judgeships. This was the first time the full legislature had been called into special session since 1915; as in 1927, an extra session was needed to remedy defects in a law setting proposed amendments for a popular vote, and this had happened also in 1897. The legislature was not limited to the subjects mentioned by Moore and could consider in special session any legislation it wanted.

When the legislature convened on April 14, bills were introduced to change the date of the election, and to authorize two more judges and make provision for their salaries. As the Republicans maneuvered to secure enough votes on the judicial bills, the legislature was told that biannually meant twice yearly, as opposed to biennially, once in two years, and by providing for biannual elections for the Assembly, it was calling for them to occur twice a year. Former assemblyman Alexander Crawford of Hudson County, Barison's clerk, who was described by The Daily Record of Long Branch as the "mouthpiece of Mayor Frank Hague", pointed out the issue and stated his belief that the amendment was defective. There was speculation that Mayor Hague, through his legal advisors, might be behind the insertion of the word "biannually", but there was no evidence. A six-member committee, with three members from each house, was appointed to find a path forward.

A number of newspapers, both within New Jersey and nationwide, commented on the situation. The Newark Call suggested the best thing to do was for the legislature to take the amendment up again "and drop it in the wastebasket". Brooklyn Life and Activities of Long Island Society deemed the situation "laughable in the extreme", and The Salt Lake Tribune deemed what had occurred as good for a laugh. The Tennessean commented that New Jersey legislators had gotten into trouble because "they were careless about, or ignorant of, their Latin derivatives". The St. Louis Post-Dispatch suggested that lawmakers might want to consult the dictionary "biennially, or better still biannually; and they might find it illuminating for them to peruse it bimonthly, or biweekly". The Los Angeles Times similarly suggested, "Evidently, Mr. Webster's illuminating book is not especially popular in New Jersey".

Legislators could have repassed the amendment at a special session in 1927, passed it again in 1928, and placed it before the voters later that year, in time to be implemented at the November election. This solution, though, would have left those running in the primary election in June not knowing the length of their terms, and it was discarded. Instead, the legislature relied on two experts: Dr. Frank A. Vizetelly of New York – editor of the Funk & Wagnalls Standard Dictionary – and Professor Robert K. Root, head of the English department at Princeton University, who stated that in its root and structure, "biannually" meant biennially, and, in addition to passing the law changing the election date to September 20, passed a resolution stating that in using the word "biannually", it meant every two years. The resolution stated that in using the word "biannually", the legislature "has used and does use the said word as a synonym for the word 'biennially', meaning every second year".

The Democrats, including Minority Leader Alexander Simpson of Hudson County, urged that the amendment be abandoned. Republican Clarence E. Case of Somerset County, who had served on the six-member committee, stated that Simpson should have pointed out the word "biannually" the previous year. Simpson stated that he was not recorded as voting on the amendment, (Note: Simpson had cast one of the two votes against the amendment in 1926, with Senator David H. Agans of Hunterdon County. See Senate 1926, p. 1101. He did not vote on the 1927 passage of the election. See Senate 1927, p. 605.) but "I would be a 99-carat fool to call the attention of the Republican conference to a blunder of this sort". Simpson also pointed out another problem with the amendment, that the existing constitution required county officials to be elected at the same time as the Assembly, but for three- or five-year terms, which would clash with the Assembly only being elected every two years. He deemed the definition resolution an "inglorious attempt to cover up a retreat" and predicted that Hague would cause the public to vote down the term extender by 120,000 votes. Nevertheless, the resolution stating that "biannually" and "biennially" were synonyms passed the Senate on April 21, 15–3, and that body then passed the bill altering the election date, 19–0. Also on April 21, the Assembly passed the bill changing the election date, 42–0, and then passed the resolution regarding the meaning of "biannually", 35–7. Both houses had the statements by Vizetelly and Root printed in their journals.

== Campaign ==
Following the special session, state politicians began to endorse or oppose the proposed amendments. On May 14, 1927, former U.S. senator Joseph S. Frelinghuysen, a Republican, endorsed them, saying that the electorate should not base their votes on whether certain politicians supported them or not, but on whether they were good for the state. Republican U.S. Senator Walter E. Edge also endorsed the amendments in a speech to party leaders in Asbury Park, stating that the less frequent elections would lead to monetary savings. Mayor Hague went to Bergen County to give a speech at the court house in Hackensack on May 17. He called the term extender amendment "a dastardly piece of politics" and stated that, "the Republicans want to change for no reason other than to regain control of the governor's office. They think that in the presidential year, the national issues will overshadow state issues and their gubernatorial candidate will be pulled through during this confusion."

I want to say that any of those drawing pay from the city or county who are derelict in their duty in this campaign will find themselves off the payroll. There are a number of these employees who are fakers and cheats, and there is no better time than now to knock the conceit out of them. I want to thank the many here who are not on the payroll, but have shown enough interest to attend this meeting. They should have the jobs of the shirkers and fakers and they will get them if disloyalty is shown by any employee. It hurts me to talk like this but the life of the Democratic Party is at stake and I am going to call a spade a spade.

— Bert Daly, Hague disciple and mayor of Bayonne, Hudson County, opposing the term extender amendment.

Hague refused to regard 1927 as an off-year election, fearing passage of the amendment would cut into his power as boss of the party. Democratic State Chair Harry Heher called a meeting of the state party committee at the request of Hague, to meet in Trenton, Mercer County, on June 24. The state committee issued a resolution supporting the zoning amendment but opposing the term extender. At the same time, New Jersey Republicans appointed a fundraising committee led by Morris County Clerk E. Bertram Mott.

In early July, the Democratic state convention passed a platform supporting the zoning amendment on the September ballot and opposing the term extender. U.S. Senator Edward I. Edwards, a Democrat, was by mid-July leading the rhetorical battle for his party, while Senator Edge and former governor Edward C. Stokes led for the Republicans. On July 22, the Republican state committee issued a pamphlet which among other matters discussed the proposed amendments. Regarding the term extender, the pamphlet noted that the greatest number of votes were cast in presidential years, and there should be no objection to having the governor elected by the most voters. Democrats argued that voting the party ticket had become routine in presidential years and that national issues would dominate the debate.

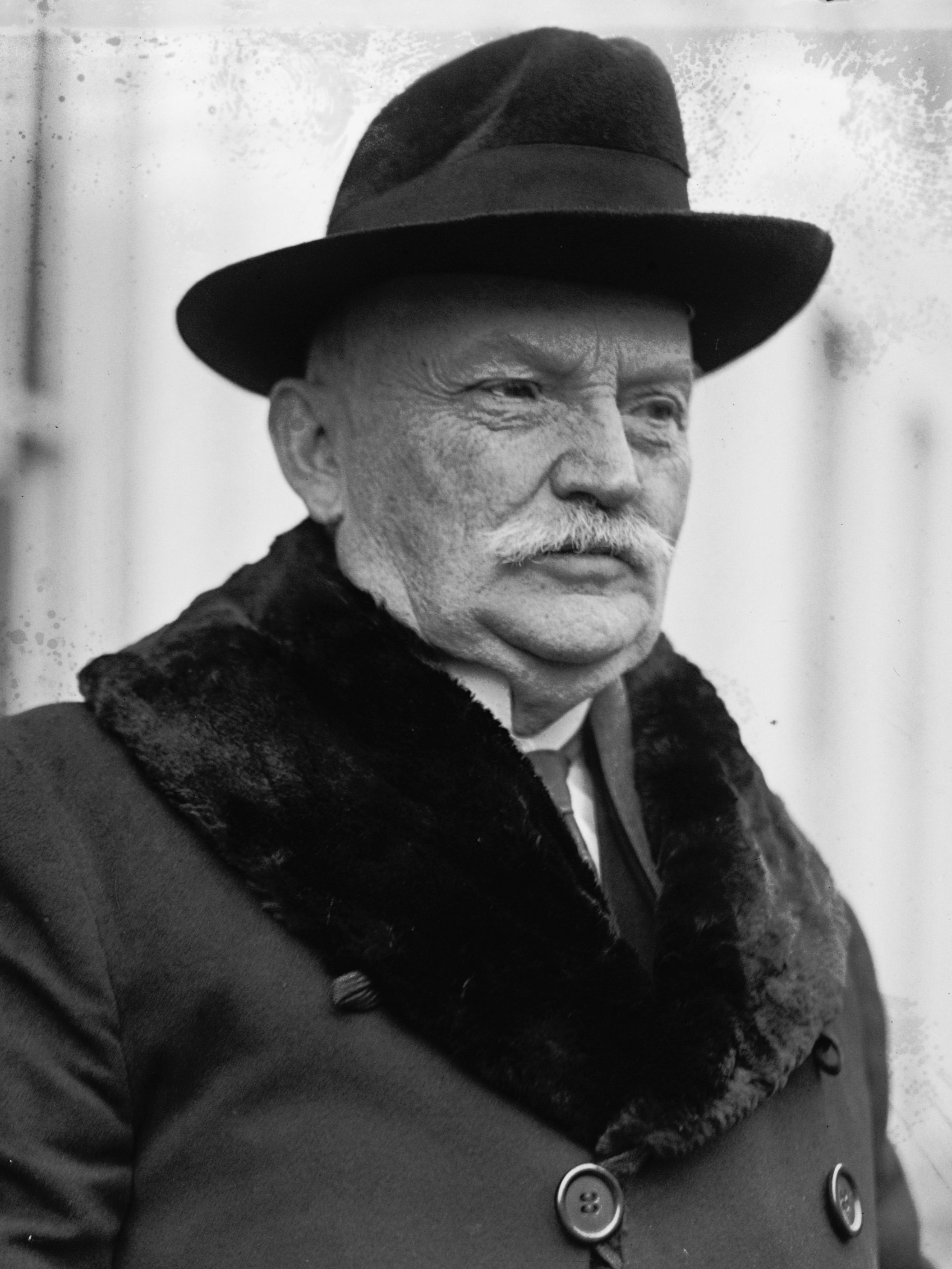
Former governor Edward C. Stokes spoke in the campaign.

On August 1, Secretary of State Joseph Fitzpatrick, a Democrat, addressed Passaic County Democrats. He urged the defeat of all of the proposed amendments except the zoning one. U.S. Representative Mary T. Norton of New Jersey, the Democratic Party's only female member of the federal House of Representatives, spoke in Hackensack on August 9, and suggested that the zoning measure had been put on the ballot to increase support for the term extender. She stated that the Republican Party's policies were increasing Democratic support. On August 31, Senator Edge called the Democratic opposition to the term extender, "the most brazen partisan appeal in the history of the state", stating that the Democrats' only argument was that "more citizens will vote, which will make more difficult the future election of Democratic governors".

Hague spoke in Camden on September 1, supporting the zoning amendment (listed as first on the ballot) but he opposed the other four, especially the term extender, the fourth on the ballot. He stated that defeat of the term extender was so vital to the Democratic Party that the final four amendments were all being opposed lest the term extender pass through confusion. He indicated that the party was not opposed to a four-year term for the governor, only to coupling the election with that of the president. Mayor Hague predicted, "Hudson County will come through with one of the greatest majorities against the last four amendments it ever rolled up". Edge responded in Atlantic City two days later, asking for Republicans to turn out in their usual two-to-one majority, "When Mayor Hague goes out of his own county to tour the state as he is now doing, he knows that the passage of these amendments will end the succession of Democratic governors."

The New York Times reported on September 10 that Republicans feared defections by woman voters persuaded by the Democratic arguments. On September 13, the Democrats held a dinner meeting at the Sea Girt Inn in Sea Girt, Monmouth County, featuring Governor Moore, Senator Edwards and former assemblyman John Matthews of Essex County. There were 1,428 present who had dinner, not counting late arrivals who stood in the room. Matthews stated that passing the amendments would give the party of Teapot Dome more power in the state. The same night, Hague spoke in Cliffside Park, Bergen County, to a crowd of about 1,300 which included many Republicans. He accused Edge and Stokes of trying to fool the people, and that they were trying to prevent the election of Democratic governors, whom the people had placed as watch dogs to guard against Republican excesses; he deemed the term extender "purely partisan". Republicans held a meeting in Trenton that day, and Edge predicted a victory if Republicans turned out; he stated that if the amendments were defeated, it would be because Republicans who had for years criticized Hague's power failed to act to break it. Mott predicted that the amendments would be passed by about 50,000 votes.

Moore had stated that having the gubernatorial election in an election year when national issues would be paramount would be "unjust and unfair"; on September 14, state Senator William B. Mackay of Bergen County responded in an address to his county's Republican committee. He said that Moore and the two other Democratic governors elected since 1916 had each used the national question of Prohibition to gain election, an issue not used by Edge when he was elected governor in 1916. The next night, thousands of Democrats crowded the Newark Armory for a rally against the amendments, with speeches by Moore, Edwards, Norton, Hague and Heher. The governor spoke against Republican arguments that the term extender would increase the number of voters in the gubernatorial election, noting that turnout for the election for governor had nearly equaled that for president in recent years. Camden County Republicans scheduled several meetings for September 19, with the main rally to feature Congressman Charles A. Wolverton, and with other meetings focused on Italian-American, African-American, Jewish and rural voters.

== Election and aftermath ==
Five proposed amendments were on the ballot on September 20, 1927. The first permitted the legislature to pass legislation allowing municipalities to enact zoning ordinances, the second allowed for the establishment of water supply and sewerage districts, while the third provided that future constitutional amendment proposals would be on the ballot at general, rather than special elections. The fourth was the term extender, and the fifth was to repeal an obsolete provision regarding the selection of judges and prosecutors. Polls were open from 7 a.m. to 8 p.m., except in rural districts that did not observe Daylight Savings Time, where votes could be cast from 6 a.m. to 7 p.m.

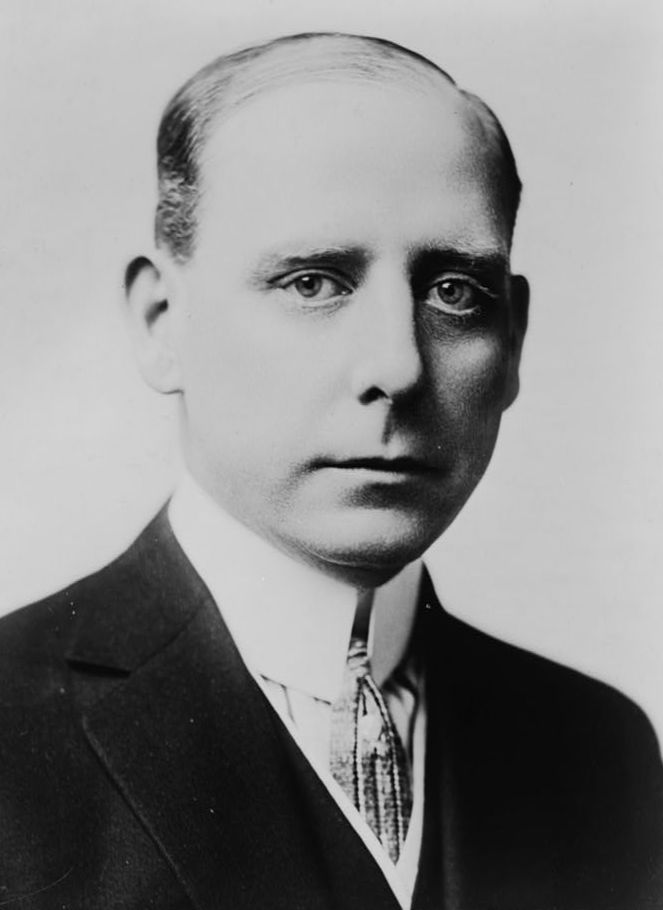
Mayor Frank Hague of Jersey City

The term extender amendment was defeated, 219,749 against to 153,960 for (41.2 percent), a margin of 65,789. Of the five amendments, only the zoning amendment passed; the term extender lost by the largest margin of the defeated amendments. Hudson County voted against it by 98,492 against to 28,338 for (22.3 percent), a margin of 70,152. Hudson County provided the margin of defeat on the four beaten amendments and voted for zoning by over 90,000 votes, providing nearly half of the margin of victory there. Turnout was 31.0 percent statewide, but 72.2 percent in Hudson County, which was the county with the greatest number of registered voters, though it was second in population to Essex County per the 1920 census. One in every three votes was cast in Hudson County. The light turnout outside of Hudson County, together with the fact that counties normally Republican by large margins voted against the proposed amendment or supported it only narrowly, meant that the Hudson County vote could not be overcome, and defeated the proposal.

Mayor Hague stated that he was "highly pleased" by the result. He called it "a bad thing to use the state constitution for political purposes". Stokes stated that the result was unsurprising, as "it is a difficult thing to educate the people to an interest in abstract organic law". Senator Edge regretted that the state "for at least five more years will remain in a class by itself, with expensive and wholly unnecessary annual legislative sessions and hybrid terms for state officials". Governor Moore said that the vote "shows that the people of New Jersey hold the constitution too sacred to permit political manipulation".

The Bergen Evening Record editorialized that the term extender amendment had been "more or less an insult to the high-minded people of New Jersey ... it was so bunglingly framed that it might well have been the handiwork of the pages in the Senate instead of the members. If it had been adopted it would have plunged us into endless confusion." That newspaper also pointed out that though Stokes had long lived in and represented Cumberland County, and that county had returned a Republican to the Assembly the year before with almost 80 percent of the vote, it had voted down the amendment. The Morning Post of Camden ascribed the Republican defeat to conservatism among New Jersey's voters when it came to changing the constitution, a feeling among them that state and national politics should be separated and that the term extender was unfair, as well as Hague's power and ability. The New York Times opined that the result showed that Hague was more powerful than ever. The Passaic Daily News argued that "the pity of the situation is that the Democrats, in their zeal to beat the 'Extender', also defeated three other amendments, which should have been carried". The Newark Daily Call stated, "outside the ranks of intense partisans there were many who would have supported the term extender amendment had it not been so crudely drawn. As a piece of botch-work it was unique and deserved its fate. It was impossible to defend it with the same enthusiasm displayed by its enemies".

After 1938, when New York rewrote its constitution, New Jersey was the only state electing members of its legislature's lower house for a one-year term. In 1939, New Jersey voters passed an amendment to allow parimutuel betting at horse races. Over the next several years, repeated attempts were made to pass a new constitution, but they failed in part because of the opposition of Hague, who considered them partisan (Edge, who had been elected governor again in 1943, supported them). In 1947, a convention that even Hague supported assembled to consider a new draft. The new constitution increased terms of members of the General Assembly to two years and of the Senate to four years, to allow legislators to give more time to state affairs and less to campaigning. According to John E. Bebout and Joseph Harrison in their study of the 1947 New Jersey Constitution, "The old system of annual selection exacted a high price in time, money, wasted experience, and diversion from the main business of the legislature." The term of the governor was increased to four years. Elections for governor and for the legislature were placed in odd-numbered years, allowing for a separation between state and federal affairs. It was passed by the voters overwhelmingly on November 4, 1947 and provided that the General Assembly shall consist of members "elected biennially". (Note: Pursuant to an amendment passed in 1966, the relevant provision now reads, "two members of the General Assembly shall be elected by the legally qualified voters of each Assembly district for terms beginning at noon of the second Tuesday in January next following their election and ending at noon of the second Tuesday in January two years thereafter.")

== Results ==
Source: Published results by the State of New Jersey

Proposed amendment #4
Choice	Votes	%
For	153,960	41.20
Against	219,749	58.80
Total	373,709	100.00

=== By county ===
County	No		Yes		Margin		Total votes
County	#	%	#	%	#	%	Total votes
Atlantic	6,759	42.12%	9,289	57.88%	-2,530	-15.76%	16,048
Bergen	11,711	51.31%	11,114	48.69%	597	2.68%	22,825
Burlington	2,865	47.61%	3,153	52.39%	-288	-4.78%	6,018
Camden	10,014	29.85%	23,536	70.15%	-13,522	-40.30%	33,550
Cape May	1,195	43.97%	1,523	56.03%	-328	-12.06%	2,718
Cumberland	2,246	55.87%	1,774	44.13%	472	11.74%	4,020
Essex	30,723	55.12%	25,013	44.88%	5,710	10.24%	55,736
Gloucester	2,455	47.96%	2,664	52.04%	-209	-4.08%	5,119
Hudson	98,492	77.66%	28,338	22.34%	70,154	55.32%	126,830
Hunterdon	1,633	60.80%	1,053	39.20%	580	21.60%	2,686
Mercer	7,565	49.47%	7,726	50.53%	-161	-1.06%	15,291
Middlesex	6,372	58.52%	4,517	41.48%	1,855	17.04%	10,889
Monmouth	8,368	64.71%	4,563	35.29%	3,805	29.42%	12,931
Morris	4,109	46.05%	4,814	53.95%	-705	-7.90%	8,923
Ocean	1,331	56.26%	1,035	43.74%	296	12.52%	2,366
Passaic	8,869	51.56%	8,333	48.44%	536	3.12%	17,202
Salem	816	46.21%	950	53.79%	-131	-7.58%	1,766
Somerset	1,973	43.50%	2,563	56.50%	-590	-13.00%	4,536
Sussex	1,288	72.93%	478	27.07%	810	45.86%	1,766
Union	8,387	44.83%	10,320	55.17%	-1,933	-10.34%	18,707
Warren	2,578	68.16%	1,204	31.84%	1,374	36.32%	3,782
Totals	219,749	58.80%	153,960	41.20%	65,789	17.60%	378,816

== Bibliography ==
- Acts of the One Hundred and Fifty-First Legislature. State of New Jersey. 1927.
- Journal of the Eighty-second Senate of the State of New Jersey. State of New Jersey. 1926.
- Journal of the Eighty-third Senate of the State of New Jersey. State of New Jersey. 1927.
- Manual of the Legislature of New Jersey, One Hundred and Fiftieth Session, 1926. State of New Jersey (Josephine A. Fitzgerald). 1926.
- Manual of the Legislature of New Jersey, One Hundred and Fifty-First Session, 1927. State of New Jersey (Josephine A. Fitzgerald). 1927.
- Minutes of the votes and proceedings of the One Hundred and Forty-seventh General Assembly of the State of New Jersey. State of New Jersey. 1923.
- Minutes of the votes and proceedings of the One Hundred and Fiftieth General Assembly of the State of New Jersey. State of New Jersey. 1926.
- Minutes of the votes and proceedings of the One Hundred and Fifty-first General Assembly of the State of New Jersey. State of New Jersey. 1927.
- Bebout, John E. (1945). Reprint of Introduction to the Proceedings of the New Jersey Constitutional Convention of 1844. MacCrellish & Quigley Co.
- Bebout, John E.; Harrison, Joseph (December 1968). "The Working of the New Jersey Constitution of 1947". William and Mary Law Review. 10 (2): 337–365.
- Julian P. Boyd, ed. (1964). Fundamental Laws and Constitutions of New Jersey, 1664–1964. D. Van Nostrand Company, Inc.
