= John V. Kenny =

American politician (1893–1975)

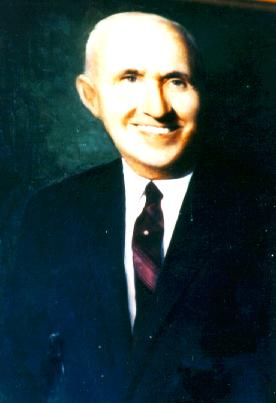

32nd Mayor of Jersey City
- In office July 1, 1949 – December 15, 1953 (resigned)
- Preceded by: Frank H. Eggers
- Succeeded by: Bernard J. Berry

Personal details
- Born: John Vincent Kenny; April 6, 1893 Jersey City, New Jersey
- Died: June 2, 1975 (aged 82) Paramus, New Jersey
- Party: Democratic

John Vincent Kenny (April 6, 1893 – June 2, 1975) was mayor of Jersey City from 1949 to 1953.

== Biography ==
He was born on April 6, 1893. A former ward leader under longtime mayor Frank Hague, he broke with his mentor after Hague engineered the appointment of his nephew, Frank Hague Eggers, in 1947. Kenny put together a commission ticket that broke Hague's 32-year rule. Although he only served as mayor until 1953, he remained the real power in Jersey City and Hudson County for three decades. Known as the "Little Guy," Kenny put together a machine that grew as corrupt as Hague's machine, though nowhere as efficient in providing city and county services.

His rule was broken in 1971, when he was indicted by the U.S. Attorney's Office for the District of New Jersey, along with the then-mayor Thomas J. Whelan and former City Council president Thomas Flaherty, on charges of conspiracy and extortion in a multimillion-dollar political kickback scheme on city and county contracts; Kenny pled guilty to federal tax evasion in 1972.

Kenny suffered a heart attack and died on June 2, 1975, in Jersey City. He was buried in Holy Name Cemetery in Jersey City.
