= Constitution of New Jersey =

American state constitution

Constitution of the State of New Jersey
- The Great Seal of the State of New Jersey

Overview
- Jurisdiction: New Jersey, United States
- Presented: September 10, 1947
- Ratified: November 4, 1947
- Date effective: January 1, 1948; 78 years ago
- Chambers: Two (bicameral New Jersey Legislature)
- Executive: Governor of New Jersey
- Judiciary: Judiciary of New Jersey

History
- Amendments: 54
- Signatories: 81

Full text
- Constitution of New Jersey at Wikisource

The Constitution of the State of New Jersey is the basic governing document of the state of New Jersey. In addition to three British Royal Charters issued for East Jersey, West Jersey and united New Jersey while they were still colonies, the state has been governed by three constitutions. The first was adopted on July 2, 1776, shortly before New Jersey ratified the United States Declaration of Independence and the second came into effect in 1844. The current document was adopted in 1947 and has been amended several times.

The state constitution reinforces the basic rights found in the United States Constitution, but also contains several unique provisions, such as regulations governing the operation of casinos. At 26,159 words, the document is slightly shorter than the average American state constitution (about 28,300 words).

== Previous versions ==
Three fundamental documents had governed the territory now known as New Jersey. The first was the Concession and Agreement, which was written in 1665 by the colony's proprietors Lord John Berkeley and Sir George Carteret, and included a provision granting religious freedom. After Berkeley and Carteret sold New Jersey to the Quakers, the colony was split into West and East Jersey. Each had its own constitution: the West Jersey Constitution (1681) and the East Jersey Constitution (1683). The two were reunited in 1702 by Queen Anne.

New Jersey's first state constitution was adopted on July 2, 1776. The American Revolutionary War was underway and George Washington had recently been defeated in New York, putting New Jersey in imminent danger of invasion. With Patriot and Tory factions plotting and battling each other, New Jersey was a state at war and was nearly a state at civil war. Composed in a span of five days and ratified only two days later, during this state of emergency, on July 2, 1776, the New Jersey State Constitution reflects the turbulence and uncertainty of the moment. Its primary objective was to provide a basic governmental framework that would preempt New Jersey's fall into anarchy, yet the constitution served as the charter document for the state's government for the next 68 years.

Among other provisions, it granted unmarried women and blacks who met property requirements the right to vote. It did not specify an amendment procedure and had to be replaced entirely in a constitutional convention.

The succeeding constitution, adopted on June 29, 1844, restricted suffrage to white males. It separated the government's powers into judicial, legislative, and executive branches and granted the people (as opposed to the legislature) the ability to elect a governor. It also formally limited state debt, a predecessor of many contemporary "debt ceiling" clauses. The constitution was amended in 1875, mainly to conform to the Fourteenth and Fifteenth Amendments. Additionally, the state's amendments required that the legislature provide for a free public school system.

== Current constitution (1947) ==
=== Preamble ===
We, the people of the State of New Jersey, grateful to Almighty God for the civil and religious liberty which He hath so long permitted us to enjoy, and looking to Him for a blessing upon our endeavors to secure and transmit the same unimpaired to succeeding generations, do ordain and establish this Constitution.

=== "Rights and Privileges" ===
Article I, as is usual for constitutions, establishes the rights and freedoms inherent people and relevant operation of the government. The rights discussed in this Article largely mirror the Constitution of the United States. Such rights include freedom of speech, a speedy and public trial, and religious freedom. Article I also contains a Victims' Bill of Rights. The article is a de facto enumeration of the rights of the common man; Article I, Section I, Paragraph 21 deliberately states:

21. This enumeration of rights shall not be construed to impair or deny others retained by the people.

This Article is similar to the U.S. Constitution's enumeration of rights. Similar to the U.S. Bill of Rights, the document also still has "holdover" rights, or rights left over from fear of Britain during the Revolutionary War. These passages still do guarantee important rights to New Jerseyans, but violations are not necessarily common. Such rights include:

11. No person shall, after acquittal, be tried for the same offense. All persons shall, before conviction, be bailable by sufficient sureties, except for capital offenses when the proof is evident or presumption great... 16. No soldier shall, in time of peace, be quartered in any house, without the consent of the owner; nor in time of war, except in a manner prescribed by law.

=== "Elections and Suffrage" ===
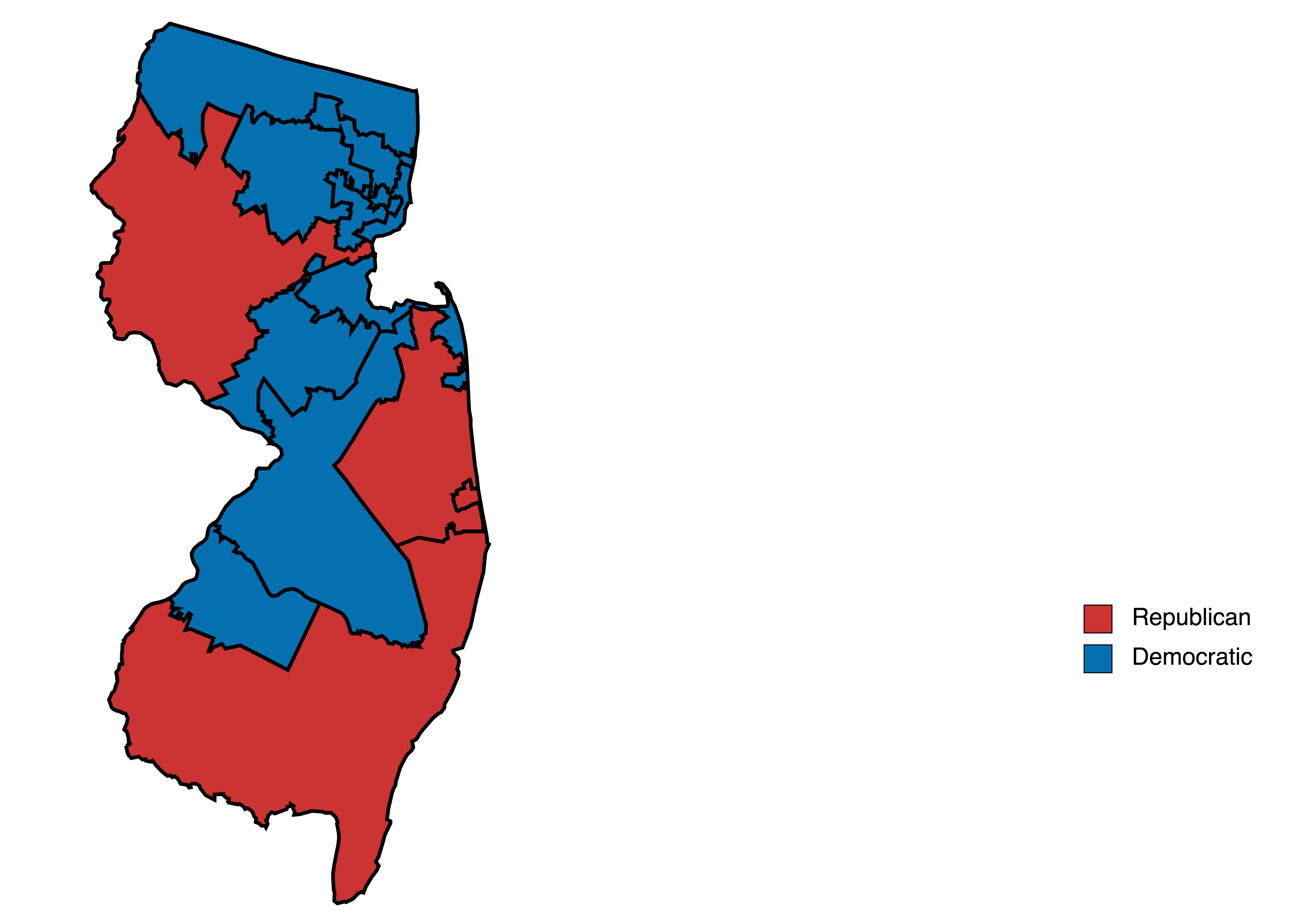
A map of New Jersey congressional districts by party control (as of the 118th Congress).

Article II lays out dates for elections of the Governor, the Lieutenant Governor, and members of the New Jersey Legislature. It establishes the qualifications necessary for voting and states the right of suffrage may be removed from certain convicted criminals. The process of absentee balloting is instituted, as well as the structure of voting by people currently in military service. The New Jersey Redistricting Commission is established, and the distribution of selection of its 13 members is discussed, who are to represent the "geographic, ethnic and racial diversity" of the state. The method of appointment of New Jersey Redistricting Commission members ensures the minority party which lost the general election prior to the census will have the upper hand in redistricting the state. Along with the other 12 appointed members, there is one "independent" member, who is to not have held office within the past five years. He is chosen by the other twelve members, yet is automatically the chairman of the commission. On the occasion that the twelve members may not reach a decision, the Commission picks two (which assumes there are two dominant parties which have their favorites) and sends them to the New Jersey Supreme Court. A majority of the court (4 of 7) then picks the one that "by education and occupational experience, by prior public service in government or otherwise, and by demonstrated ability to represent the best interest of the people of this State."

=== "Distribution of the Powers of Government" ===
The sole content of Article III is the statement regarding separation of powers. The three branches (executive, judicial, and legislative) are created and defined. No individual can be affiliated with more than one unless the Constitution explicitly allows it. Before the constitution was amended, a vacancy in the Governor of New Jersey would be filled by the president of the New Jersey Senate, who would retain their Senate seat.

=== "Legislative" ===
Article IV establishes the bicameral New Jersey Legislature, composed of 40 in the Senate and 80 in the General Assembly, and their apportionment amongst the state. The Apportionment Commission is created within the Legislature to modify the proration of legislative districts on a rolling basis, following every United States Census. It also creates the requirements for office, and the roles of the Senate and General Assembly. This includes the judging of elections, the selection of officers, a journal of proceedings, and the inability to adjourn for a period of greater than three days without the consent of the other house. This article also allows the Legislature to appoint commissions, committees, and other bodies to help perform the functions of the Legislature. Regulations regarding members of the Legislature, including singularity of employment. This is the law that no senator or member of the General Assembly can hold any other Federal or State position, and also cannot be a judge. Further topics are discussed, including bills, agencies, subdivisions, and emergencies. A negative enumeration of legislative powers is included within the article. Among this list of powers denied are granting divorces, gambling (with obvious exceptions), and passing omnibus acts. Although the phrase omnibus acts is never formally used in this document, the actual wording skirts around the phrase:

...to avoid improper influences which may result from intermixing in one and the same act such things as have no proper relation to each other...

Finally, an oath/affirmation is included that is required by members and officers of the Legislature before the person enters upon his/her duties.

=== "Executive" ===
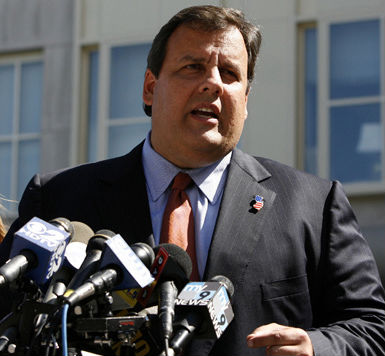
Chris Christie, the former governor of the state of New Jersey

Article V enacts the executive branch. It also sets out the terms of office for the governor and lieutenant governor, the succession of future governors, and the process of gubernatorial elections. The Governor is given total authority over clemency except in cases of impeachment. This is to bar him from pardon in his own impeachment, or disturbing cases of treason. His clemency powers extend to the ability to suspend and remit fines and forfeitures. The system of granting parole is provided by law. The "militia" is created, or what is now the National Guard. Regulation regarding nominations and appointments of generals and flag offices is described. The executive and administrative offices, departments, and instrumentalities of the State government are placed under the supervision of the Governor. The Governor has the ability to appoint the Secretary of State and the Attorney General with the consent of the New Jersey Senate, though he also can appoint the Lieutenant Governor to serve as Secretary of State without consent of the Senate. He can also start inquiries into the conduct of officers and employees.

=== "Judicial" ===
Article VI creates the Judicial branch, and permits the establishment, alteration, and abolishment of any court other than the Supreme Court of New Jersey. Under the State Constitution, "'judicial power shall be vested in a Supreme Court, a Superior Court, County Courts and inferior courts of limited jurisdiction.'"

The Supreme Court is New Jersey's appellate court of last resort. "By constitutional mandate, the Court consists of a Chief Justice and six associate justices, with five members constituting a quorum." Article VI, Section II, Paragraph 3 provides that, "The Supreme Court makes its own rules governing the administration of all State courts 'and, subject to law, the practice and procedure of all such courts.'"

The State Constitution renders the New Jersey Superior Court, Appellate Division the intermediate appellate court, and "[a]ppeals may be taken to the Appellate Division of the Superior Court from the law and chancery divisions of the Superior Court and in such other causes as may be provided by law."

"The trial divisions of the Superior Court are the principal trial courts of New Jersey. They are located within the State's various judicial geographic units, called 'vicinages,' R. 1:33-2(a), and are organized into two basic divisions: the Chancery Division and the Law Division" of the New Jersey Superior Court.

The Governor's power to appoint and nominate the judges of the Supreme and Superior Courts, with the consent of the Senate, is established. He may also nominate and appoint, with the consent of the Senate, judges of the inferior courts whose jurisdiction is only within one municipality. The term of office of Justices and Judges, including their retirement ages and pensions, is stated. Impeachment of Justices and Judges is also legalized, and their inabiling of powers until acquitted. During their term, the judges are restricted to one public office and may not practice law outside the state government. The powers of the Chief Justice of the Supreme Court are enumerated. Terms specifying costs of the facilities and materials used by the Justice Department are listed.

=== "Public Officers and Employees" ===
Article VII involves the public officers and employees, including appointment/nomination, compensation, promotions, affirmations, and powers. The role of officers in the state government is discussed. Before the officer enters the duties of office, the officer must subscribe an oath. Appointments for officers are based upon merit, fitness, and examinations. Fees are paid to the New Jersey State Treasury. The term of office for an officer commences on the day of the date of their commissions. The Auditor, who has a term of five years, is to be appointed by the New Jersey Senate and New Jersey General Assembly. The rest of the section details the duties of the State Auditor and the nomination/appointment of county prosecutors, county clerks, surrogates, and sheriffs. County prosecutors are nominated and appointed by the Governor. The term of office for county clerks and surrogates is five years, and for sheriffs three years. Impeachment and the process by which impeachment occurs are discussed:

A state officer may be impeached while in office or for two years after leaving office. The impeachment process is similar to that of the Federal level: an absolute majority in the lower house (the General Assembly) against the employee causes a trial to take place in the upper house (the State Senate) with the Chief Justice presiding. Unlike the Federal process, the oath necessary to participate in the impeachment sessions is specified and requires the senators to "truly and impartially" address the charge as a reminder that they are exercising more judicial functions. Two-thirds, or 27 votes, are needed to convict, but the President of the Senate is excluded from the trial, so the required percentage is slightly higher than two-thirds of 40. The maximum penalty is removal from office with disqualification to hold further state office. However, the impeachment does not count towards the restriction on double jeopardy; after being convicted by the senate, a person could then be tried by the judiciary and punished further. If this crime was listed according to Article II, Section I, Item 7, the offender can be disenfranchised.

=== "Taxation and Finance" ===
In Article VIII, taxation is created. It states the Legislature's duty to create laws "to provide the value of land" and the uniformity of these rules. Taxing of lands of agriculture is discussed, as well as taxation regulations regarding the re-use of agricultural land for different purposes. Tax exemption is legalized, including the continued tax exemptions carried over from the previous constitution. Alteration or repeal of tax exemption is allowed, provided that the real or personal property is not used for "religious, educational, charitable or cemetery purposes, as defined by law, and owned by any corporation or association organized and conducted exclusively for one or more of such purposes and not operating for profit." Tax exemptions regarding the honorably discharged and exemptions for senior citizens who live in apartments and may/may not be disabled are discussed. Pensions, disability, and retirement programs for federal railroad workers, or any state employees are described. Surviving spouses of deceased citizens, besides exceptions, are entitled to tax deductions. This article also restricts any citizen from receiving more than one tax deduction. The Legislature's right to instantiating a homestead statue is discussed. General laws enacted by legislature which permit municipalities to grant tax exemptions on buildings in blighted urban areas are legalized, with exceptions relating to the deduction's permanence. Income taxes are banned unless the revenue is placed into a specific perpetual fund, or if the taxer is receiving payments from the Federal Railroad Retirement Act, or similar.

The credit of the state is barred from being publicly or privately loaned. Any fiscal year plan which creates more than one percent debt and/or liabilities is banned. The voting on such plans in public elections is banned, as well as the creation of debt or liabilities "for purposes of war, or to repel invasion, or to suppress insurrection or to meet an emergency caused by disaster or act of God." Taxation of motor vehicle fuel, and the funds the moneys are deposited in are discussed; the appropriation of moneys from the Sales and Use Tax Act are defined. A council of local mandates is created, and regulation regarding the appointment of the members for this body. Some moneys from the Corporate Business Tax Act are directed to the General Fund. The appropriation of moneys to the remediation of hazardous discharges and buildings that hold hazardous substances or public water supplies are discussed. A General Fund is created, as well as the distribution of moneys into and from it. The "clearance, replanning, development or redevelopment of blighted areas" is made a public and state duty. The redevelopment of any of these properties is permitted to be completed by municipal, public, or private corporations. The continuing of appropriation of moneys to the corporation that completes the redevelopment after its completion is banned. A free public school system is created, as well as a busing system. The appropriation of moneys into the public school system fund is legalized. The lands that are tidal or were within forty years ago are protected from riparian claims.

=== "Amendments" ===
Article IX involves amendments to the New Jersey state constitution. A potential amendment is submitted through the Senate or General Assembly. The amendment is voted upon by both of the houses. If it gathers at least three-fifths of both the Senate and the General Assembly, the amendment is to be submitted to be voted upon by the people of New Jersey. If a majority votes for the amendment, the amendment is voted on in the next legislative year. If the amendment is passed by a majority yet again, the amendment is to be submitted to be voted upon by the people of New Jersey.

It also explains how the amendments are submitted to the people, i.e., all amendments are to be voted upon separately.

=== "General Provisions" ===
Article X contains involves miscellaneous final addenda.

Paragraph 1 states that "the seal of the State shall be kept by the Governor, or person administering the office of Governor, and used by him officially, and shall be called the Great Seal of the State of New Jersey." The seal's design and the state flag are not mentioned.

Paragraph 2 provides for the salutation and protocol of giving grants and commissions.

Paragraph 3 states that "All writs shall be in the name of the State. All indictments shall conclude: "against the peace of this State, the government and dignity of the same."

Paragraph 4 provides for a rule of construction that words such as "person" and all pronouns include both sexes.

Paragraph 5 provides that the effective date of the Constitution is January 1, 1948, "except as herein otherwise provided."

=== "Schedule" ===
Article XI, the schedule, is the list of amendments to the Constitution in order of their addition. Sections I through IV, were adopted with the rest of the constitution. They lay out the process of supersession. The others were adopted as individual amendments. (Note: Article XI, Section V, paragraphs 1, 2, 3, 4 added effective December 8, 1966. This section is a complete add-on. Article XI, Section VI, added effective December 7, 1978. The constitution states that they are adding a whole section more clearly here. Article XI, Section VII added effective January 17, 2006. Again, this one is clearly written so the reader knows the amendment was for a whole section.) The Article orders the Legislature to pass all laws necessary for the activation of the new constitution. Existing instruments of government, contracts, officers, and judgments are continued unless they are expired, superseded, altered, or repealed. This is to prevent application as an ex post facto law or violation of the Contract Clause, both prohibited by the United States Constitution. The new legislature members are elected, and the process of election, term, and rotation are created. The members may be appointed to offices of government, likely new ones created at the behest of Article XI, Section I, Paragraph 2.

The remaining sections are the amendments. For reasons unknown, this constitution has never been directly updated since its adoption. The amendments are enumerated in this Article. Essentially, this section of the article records the development of the constitution through amendments. Such amendments include the abolishment of the New Jersey Court of Errors and Appeals and Chancery, transferring the cases before them and offices under the other courts, such as the New Jersey Supreme Court.

The requirement of the Supreme Court of the United States that the apportionment of all state legislatures be by population is stated. It mainly consists of an interim list of districts and the number of Senators they can elect until the next United States Census comes around and is received by the Governor. It also contains provisions for apportioning ten districts of the lower house. If it is deadlocked, the Chief Justice of the New Jersey Supreme Court will appoint an 11th and then the vote is by absolute majority. It was passed on election day, 1966, but was first applied on January 17, 2006. This was superseded in 1995 by Article II, Section II. It took effect on December 7, 1978. Section VII, the final section of this constitution, was passed in a referendum on November 8, 2005, and takes full effect at noon, January 19, 2010, following the transfer of power to the next executive.

== Criticisms ==
The New Jersey State Constitution has been criticized, mainly for its disorganized succession plan, as seen following Governor Jim McGreevey's 2004 resignation. Senate President Richard Codey assumed command, and since he legally held both positions, he temporarily had more power than any other governor in the country, being the head of both executive and legislative branches. An amendment was later passed to prevent the possibility of executive and legislative conflation in the future. The constitution has also been denounced for its unorganized composition. Paragraphs traditionally in Article I, e.g. the banning of ex post facto laws, are in Article IV "Legislative". (Note: The law banning the passage of ex post facto laws is listed in Article IV, Section VII, Paragraph 2.)

== See also ==
- New Jersey's 1927 biannual elections proposal, failed attempt to amend the 1844 constitution
- Law of New Jersey
- John Farmer Jr., he served as Acting Governor of New Jersey for 90 minutes on January 8, 2002
- State constitution (United States)
- Governors of New Jersey
