= List of elections in 1937 =

The following elections occurred in the year 1937.

== Asia ==
- 1937 Afghan parliamentary election
- 1936–1937 Iraqi parliamentary election
- December 1937 Iraqi parliamentary election
- 1937 Philippine local elections
- 1937 Iranian legislative election
- 1937 Japanese general election
- 1937 Siamese general election
- 1937 Soviet Union legislative election

=== India ===
- 1937 Indian provincial elections
- 1937 Madras Presidency legislative assembly election
- 1937 Madras Presidency Legislative Council election
- 1937 Sind legislative assembly election

== Europe ==
- 1937 Danish local elections
- 1937 Finnish presidential election
- 1937 Icelandic parliamentary election
- 1937 Irish general election and constitutional referendum
- 1937 Monegasque general election
- 1937 Romanian general election
- 1937 Soviet Union legislative election
- 1937 Dutch general election
- 1937 Luxembourg general election
- 1937 Norwegian local elections

=== United Kingdom ===
- 1937 Buckingham by-election
- 1937 Cheltenham by-election
- 1937 Combined English Universities by-election
- 1937 Glasgow Hillhead by-election
- 1937 Glasgow Springburn by-election
- 1937 Hemel Hempstead by-election
- 1937 Ilford by-election
- 1937 Kingston-upon-Thames by-election
- 1937 Oxford University by-election
- 1937 Plymouth Drake by-election
- 1937 St Pancras North by-election
- 1937 Stalybridge and Hyde by-election
- 1937 Tonbridge by-election
- 1937 Wandsworth Central by-election
- 1937 York by-election

==== United Kingdom local ====
===== English local =====
- 1937 Bermondsey Borough election
- 1937 Southwark Borough election

== North America ==
=== Canada ===
- 1937 British Columbia general election
- 1937 Edmonton municipal election
- 1937 Nova Scotia general election
- 1937 Ontario general election
- 1937 Ottawa municipal election
- 1937 Toronto municipal election
- 1937 Yukon general election

=== United States ===
- 1937 New York state election

==== United States lieutenant gubernatorial ====
- 1937 Virginia lieutenant gubernatorial election

==== United States gubernatorial ====
- 1937 New Jersey gubernatorial election
- 1937 United States gubernatorial elections
- 1937 Virginia gubernatorial election

==== United States House of Representatives ====
- 1937 United States House of Representatives elections

==== United States Senate ====
- 1937 United States Senate elections
- 1937 United States Senate special election in Arkansas

==== United States mayoral elections ====
- 1937 Cleveland mayoral election
- 1937 Evansville mayoral election
- 1937 Hartford, Connecticut mayoral election
- 1937 Los Angeles mayoral election
- 1937 Manchester, New Hampshire mayoral election
- 1937 New York City mayoral election
- 1937 Pittsburgh mayoral election
- 1937 Springfield mayoral election

== South America ==
- 1937 Argentine presidential election
- 1937 Chilean parliamentary election
- 1937 Colombian parliamentary election

== Oceania ==
=== Australia ===
- 1937 Australian federal election
- 1937 Australian referendum
- 1937 Corowa state by-election
- 1937 Gordon state by-election
- 1937 Gwydir by-election
- 1937 Tasmanian state election
- 1937 Victorian state election
- 1937 Woollahra state by-election

== See also ==
- Category:1937 elections
