= 1937 United States gubernatorial elections =

- November 2, 1937

2 governorships
	Majority party	Minority party
Party	Democratic	Republican
Seats before	38	7
Seats after	39	6
Seat change	▲1	▼1
Seats up	1	1
Seats won	2	0
- Democratic gain Democratic hold

United States gubernatorial elections were held on November 2, 1937, in two states. Virginia holds its gubernatorial elections in odd numbered years, every 4 years, following the United States presidential election year. New Jersey at this time held gubernatorial elections every 3 years, which it would abandon in 1949. This marks the Democratic Party's largest gubernatorial extent in history and the largest for any party.

== Race summary ==
=== Results ===
State	Incumbent	Party	First elected	Result	Candidates
New Jersey	Harold G. Hoffman	Republican	1934	Incumbent term-limited. New governor elected. Democratic gain.	✓ A. Harry Moore (Democratic) 50.84%; Lester H. Clee (Republican) 47.75%; James E. Murray (Independent Labor) 0.65%; Scattering 0.76%
Virginia	George C. Peery	Democratic	1933	Incumbent term-limited. New governor elected. Democratic hold.	✓ James Hubert Price (Democratic) 82.78%; J. Powell Royall (Republican) 15.78%; Donald Burke (Communist) 0.78%; James Arthur Edgerton (Prohibition) 0.66%
