= 1930 United States Senate election in New Jersey =

1930 United States Senate elections in New Jersey
- November 4, 1930
- Turnout: 59% (▼24pp)
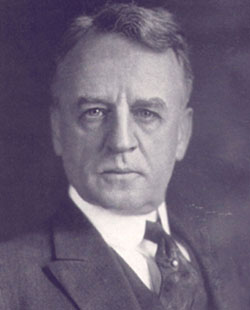

Nominee	Dwight Morrow	Alexander Simpson
Party	Republican	Democratic
Popular vote	601,497	401,007
Percentage	58.50%	39.00%
- County results Morrow: 50–60% 60–70% 70–80% Simpson: 50–60% 60–70%
Senator before election
David Baird Jr.
Republican
Elected Senator
Dwight Morrow
Republican

The United States Senate elections of 1930 in New Jersey was held on November 4, 1930.

Walter Evans Edge, the Senator elected in 1924, resigned in 1929 to take office as U.S. Ambassador to France. Interim appointee David Baird Jr. chose not to seek re-election and Republican Dwight Morrow won a landslide victory to succeed him.

Morrow also won a special election held the same day for the remaining month of Edge's six-year term, defeating Democrat Thelma Parkinson. Morrow would only serve for ten months before his death in October 1931.

== Background ==
In July 1929, President Herbert Hoover announced his selection of Senator Walter Evans Edge as United States Ambassador to France. However, Edge's appointment and resignation from the Senate were delayed for political purposes.

By resigning after 5 October 1929, Edge empowered Governor Morgan F. Larson to appoint a successor rather than leave the seat vacant until the fall election, when two elections would be held: a special election to complete Edge's term and a regular election for the six-year term beginning in 1931. Larson publicly pledged to appoint David Baird Jr., who was widely expected to run in the June primary. Before Edge's appointment, there had been rumors that Hoover sought to have Larson appoint Dwight Morrow instead; Larson denied the charge.

== Republican primary ==
=== Candidates ===
- Franklin W. Fort, U.S. Representative from East Orange
- Joseph Frelinghuysen, former U.S. Senator (1917–23) and candidate for Senate in 1928
- John A. Kelly (Note: also a candidate for the special election to complete the term)
- Dwight Morrow, U.S. Ambassador to Mexico and former partner at J.P. Morgan & Co.

==== Declined ====
- David Baird Jr., interim Senator

=== Campaign ===
Dwight Morrow, U.S. Ambassador to Mexico, father of Anne Morrow Lindbergh, and one of the richest men in the state, was the front-runner for the nomination. Morrow took little part in the early campaign. Shortly after announcing his candidacy in the spring, he left to participate in the London Naval Conference.

Upon his entry, Morrow's chief opponent was former U.S. Senator Joseph S. Frelinghuysen Sr., who had announced his candidacy even before Edge's appointment and resignation. Frelinghuysen stressed his campaign as a challenge to the establishment, identifying Morrow as an ally of the "Baird-Larson-Kean" group which controlled all of New Jersey's statewide offices, which Frelinghuysen termed "machine domination." Frelinghuysen additionally suggested Baird's appointment had been orchestrated by the machine to allow Morrow to avoid controversial votes, such as on the Smoot-Hawley Tariff, which Frelinghuysen supported. State party chairman E. Bertram Mott responded that the state committee took no official side in the primary, though "a great majority ... [were] in favor of Mr. Morrow for the nomination."

One of Morrow's few public statements during the campaign came in his opening speech on May 16, which called for a repeal of the Eighteenth Amendment to the United States Constitution. Opponents of prohibition, including Governor Larson and Democratic candidate Alexander S. Simpson, praised his statement, while critics compared him unfavorably to Al Smith. Outside of the state, his comments were taken as evidence that prohibition was failing. His chief critic on the issue was Representative Franklin W. Fort, who entered the race late as a candidate of the Anti-Saloon League. Conceding that Prohibition would be repealed some time in the future, Fort focused his attacks on Morrow's alliance with Atlantic City boss Nucky Johnson, who Fort argued would prevent Morrow from supporting any enforcement of the Volstead Act in the intervening years.

Frelinghuysen attempted to reframe the contest as a debate over foreign policy, criticizing Morrow's role negotiating the London Naval Treaty, which he argued left the United States needing billions in naval spending, and accusing Morrow of failing to oppose the League of Nations and World Court. As the race came to a close, Frelinghuysen attacked both Morrow and Fort for evading key issues.

=== Results ===
1930 Republican U.S. Senate primary
Party	Candidate	Votes	%
Republican	Dwight W. Morrow	422,978	71.00%
Republican	Franklin W. Fort	118,621	19.19%
Republican	Joseph S. Frelinghuysen	47,811	8.03%
Republican	John A. Kelly	6,335	1.06%
Total votes		595,745	100.00%

1930 Republican U.S. Senate special primary
Party	Candidate	Votes	%
Republican	Dwight W. Morrow	466,917	93.41%
Republican	John A. Kelly	32,935	6.59%
Total votes		499,852	100.00%

== Democratic primary ==
=== Candidates ===
- Alexander Simpson, State Senator for Hudson County

=== Results ===
Simpson was unopposed for the Democratic nomination.

1930 Democratic U.S. Senate primary
Party	Candidate	Votes	%
Democratic	Alexander Simpson	118,494	100.0%
Total votes		118,494	100.0%

== General election ==
=== Candidates ===
- Esther Hill Elfreth (National Prohibition)
- Henry Jager (Socialist)
- Dozier Will Graham (Communist)
- Alexander Kudlik (Socialist Labor)
- Dwight Morrow (Republican), U.S. Ambassador to Mexico
- Alexander Simpson (Democrat), State Senator from Hudson County

=== Results ===
United States Senate election in New Jersey, 1930
Party	Candidate	Votes	%
Republican	Dwight W. Morrow	601,497	58.50%
Democratic	Alexander Simpson	401,007	39.00%
Prohibition	Esther Hill Elfeth	18,903	1.84%
Socialist	Henry Jager	4,519	0.44%
Communist	Dozier W. Graham	1,627	0.16%
Socialist Labor	Alexander Kudlik	670	0.07%
Majority		200,490	19.50%
Turnout		1,028,223	
Republican hold			

==== Results by county ====
1930 U.S. Senate election in New Jersey
County	Morrow		Simpson		Other	
County	Votes	%	Votes	%	Votes	%
Atlantic	28,056	72.7%	9,649	25.0%	848	2.2%
Bergen	76,725	68.4%	33,779	30.1%	1,602	1.4%
Burlington	15,448	71.2%	5,143	23.7%	1,099	5.1%
Camden	54,778	73.7%	16,384	22.0%	3,171	4.3%
Cape May	7,606	75.7%	2,050	20.4%	393	3.9%
Cumberland	12,453	64.6%	4,955	25.7%	1,879	9.7%
Essex	98,698	64.8%	50,424	33.1%	3,093	2.0%
Gloucester	13,338	71.3%	3,598	19.2%	1,780	9.5%
Hudson	57,166	30.5%	128,917	68.8%	1,235	0.7%
Hunterdon	7,128	54.9%	4,612	35.5%	1,235	9.5%
Mercer	24,305	58.3%	16,221	38.9%	1,197	2.9%
Middlesex	28,896	47.3%	31,283	51.2%	918	1.5%
Monmouth	28,985	62.8%	15,679	34.0%	1,516	3.3%
Morris	21,541	70.8%	7,599	25.0%	1,264	4.2%
Ocean	8,384	74.7%	2,590	23.1%	244	2.2%
Passaic	40,405	58.9%	26,877	39.2%	1,352	2.0%
Salem	5,551	62.7%	2,243	25.3%	1,060	12.0%
Somerset	10,260	64.3%	5,269	33.0%	432	2.7%
Sussex	5,303	59.2%	3,384	37.8%	273	3.0%
Union	49,014	65.2%	24,880	33.1%	1,274	1.7%
Warren	7,457	55.1%	5,471	40.4%	595	4.4%

== See also ==
- 1930 United States Senate elections
