= 1931 New Jersey gubernatorial election =

- November 3, 1931
- Turnout: 69.53% (▼17.79%)
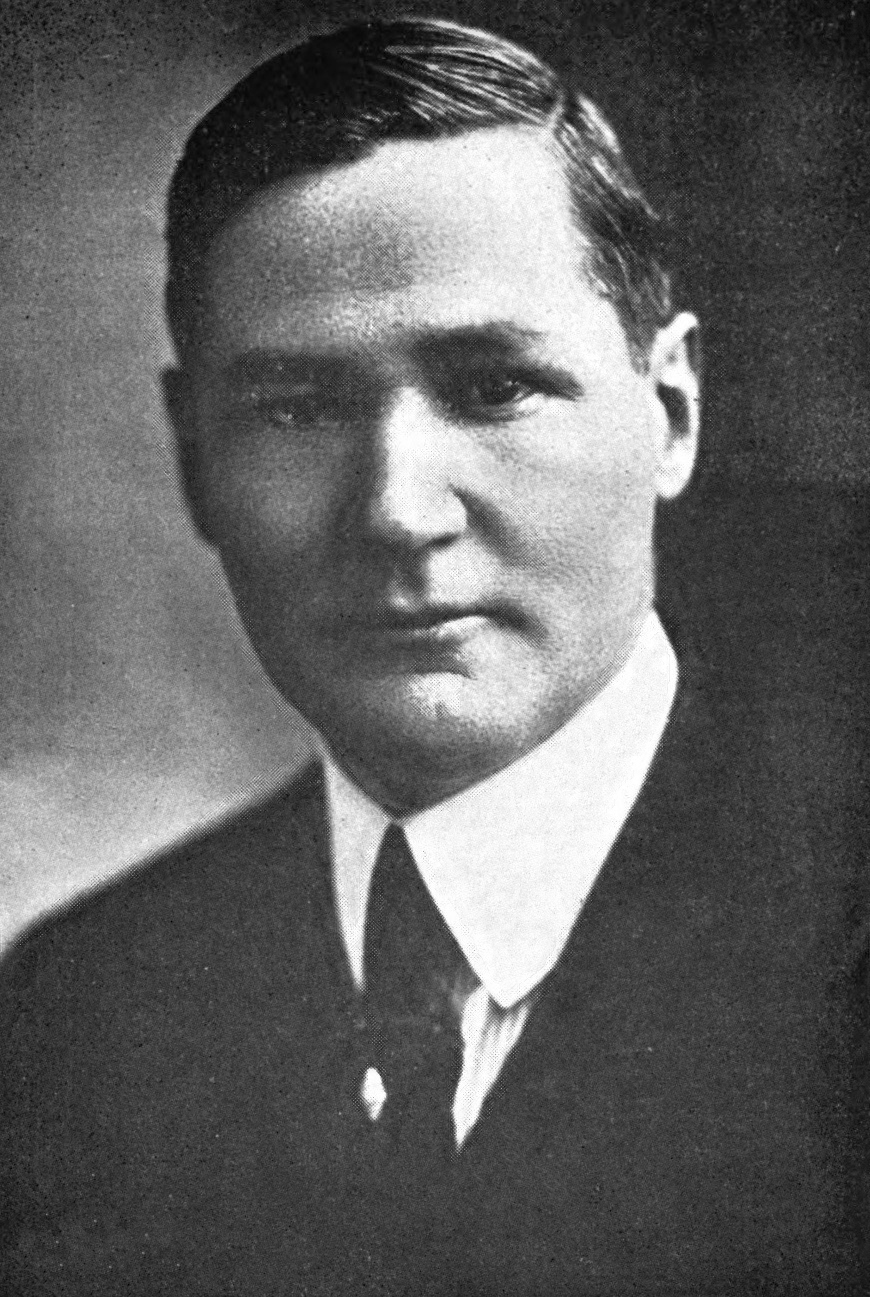

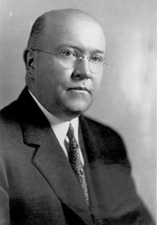
| Nominee | A. Harry Moore | David Baird Jr. |
| Party | Democratic | Republican |
| Popular vote | 735,504 | 505,451 |
| Percentage | 57.82% | 39.74% |
- County results Moore: 40–50% 50–60% 60–70% 70–80% Baird: 40–50% 50–60%
Governor before election
Morgan Foster Larson
Republican
Elected Governor
A. Harry Moore
Democratic

The 1931 New Jersey gubernatorial election was held on November 3, 1931. Democratic nominee A. Harry Moore defeated Republican nominee David Baird Jr. with 57.82% of the vote.

== Republican primary ==
=== Candidates ===
- David Baird Jr., former interim U.S. Senator

==== Withdrew ====
- Robert Carey, Jersey City judge and candidate for governor in 1928

== General election ==
=== Candidates ===
- John J. Ballam, founder of the Communist Party and trade union organizer (Communist)
- David Baird Jr., former interim U.S. Senator (Republican)
- Owen M. Bruner (Prohibition)
- John C. Butterworth (Socialist Labor)
- Edmund R. Halsey (independent)
- John A. Kelly (Taxpayers)
- A. Harry Moore, former governor (Democratic)
- Herman F. Niessner (Socialist)

=== Results ===
New Jersey gubernatorial election, 1931
| Party | Candidate | Votes | % | ±% |
|---|---|---|---|---|
| Democratic | A. Harry Moore | 735,504 | 57.82% | |
| Republican | David Baird Jr. | 505,451 | 39.74% | |
| Independent | Edmund R. Halsey | 13,474 | 1.06% | |
| Prohibition | Owen M. Bruner | 8,101 | 0.64% | |
| Socialist | Herman F. Niessner | 5,247 | 0.41% | |
| Communist | John J. Ballam | 1,753 | 0.14% | |
| Socialist Labor | John C. Butterworth | 1,553 | 0.12% | |
| Independent | John A. Kelly | 951 | 0.08% | |
| Majority | | | | |
| Turnout | | | | |
| Democratic gain from Republican | | Swing | | |
