= Senator Bright (disambiguation) =

Jesse D. Bright (1812–1875) was a U.S. Senator from Indiana from 1845 to 1862. Senator Bright may also refer to:

- Lee Bright (born 1970), South Carolina State Senate
- Scott Bright (fl. 2020s), Colorado State Senate
- William H. Bright (1863–1933), New Jersey State Senate
