= Governor Hoffman =

Governor Hoffman may refer to:

- Harold G. Hoffman (1896–1954), 41st Governor of New Jersey
- John T. Hoffman (1828–1888), 23rd Governor of New York
