= William L. Dill =

New Jersey politician

- Born: March 15, 1874; Freeburg, Pennsylvania
- Died: January 14, 1952 (aged 77); Paterson, New Jersey
- Occupations: Secretary to the Mayor of Paterson, lay member of the New Jersey Court of Errors and Appeals
- Known for: Democratic nomination for Governor of New Jersey
- Political party: Democratic Party
- Opponent: Republican candidate Morgan Foster Larson
- Parent(s): William H. Dill and Margaret C. Dill

William Leslie Dill (March 15, 1874 – January 14, 1952) was an American jurist and politician who was the Democratic nominee for Governor of New Jersey in 1928 and 1934. He was the only Democrat to lose a New Jersey gubernatorial election between 1916 and 1943 and the only one to lose to someone other than Walter Evans Edge between 1907 and 1946.

== Biography ==
Dill was born in 1874 in Freeburg, Pennsylvania to William H. and Margaret C. Dill. Forced to leave school after the death of his father, he came to Paterson, New Jersey at the age of 12 and began work as an office boy. He later worked in the fire insurance business and for Paterson newspapers.

From 1901 to 1903 he served as secretary to the Mayor of Paterson. He served six years as president of the Paterson Finance Board. In 1913 he was named secretary to the New Jersey Senate, and in 1915 was named Assistant Secretary of State. Also in 1915, he was appointed State Motor Vehicle Commissioner.

Dill stepped down from his position as Motor Vehicle Commissioner in 1928 to seek the Democratic nomination for Governor of New Jersey, opposing the Republican candidate Morgan Foster Larson. In his campaign speeches Larson tied Dill to the machine of Democratic party boss Frank Hague. Dill received 671,728 votes to Larson's 824,005.

In 1933 Dill was appointed as a lay member of the New Jersey Court of Errors and Appeals by Governor A. Harry Moore. He resigned from that office in 1934 to campaign for Governor of New Jersey a second time. His Republican opponent this time was Harold G. Hoffman, who had succeeded Dill as Motor Vehicle Commissioner. During the campaign Dill was again linked to Hague's bossism. Hoffman was victorious in the general election, marking the first time in 27 years that the Democrats lost the governorship in a non-presidential election year.

Dill was reappointed to the Court of Errors and Appeals in 1943 by Governor Charles Edison, remaining on the bench until 1948 when the court was abolished under the new State Constitution. He died in 1950 at his home in Paterson at the age of 77.

Party political offices
Preceded by A. Harry Moore	Democratic Nominee for Governor of New Jersey; 1928	Succeeded by A. Harry Moore
Preceded by A. Harry Moore	Democratic Nominee for Governor of New Jersey; 1934	Succeeded by A. Harry Moore
