= 1925 New Jersey gubernatorial election =

- November 3, 1925
- Turnout: 74.27%
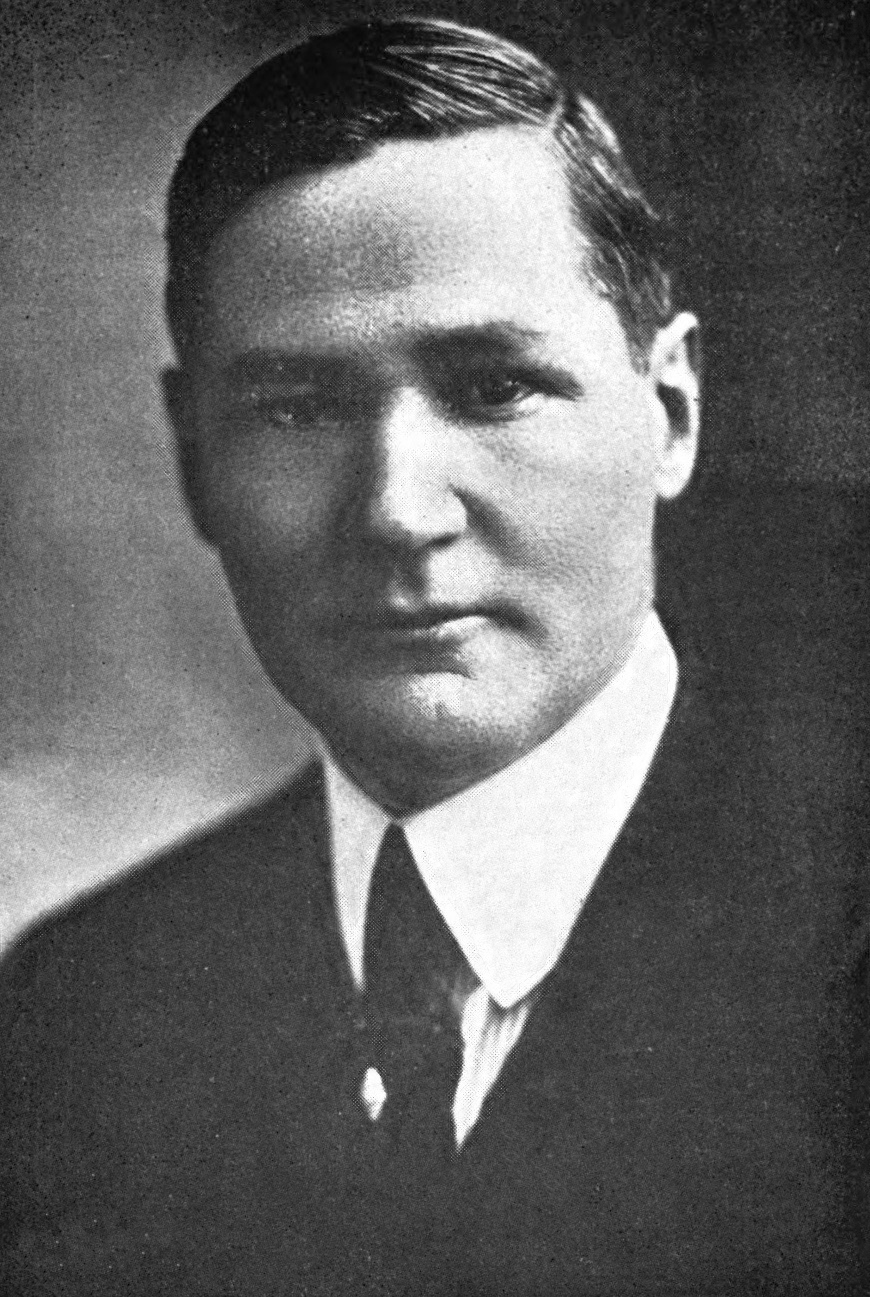

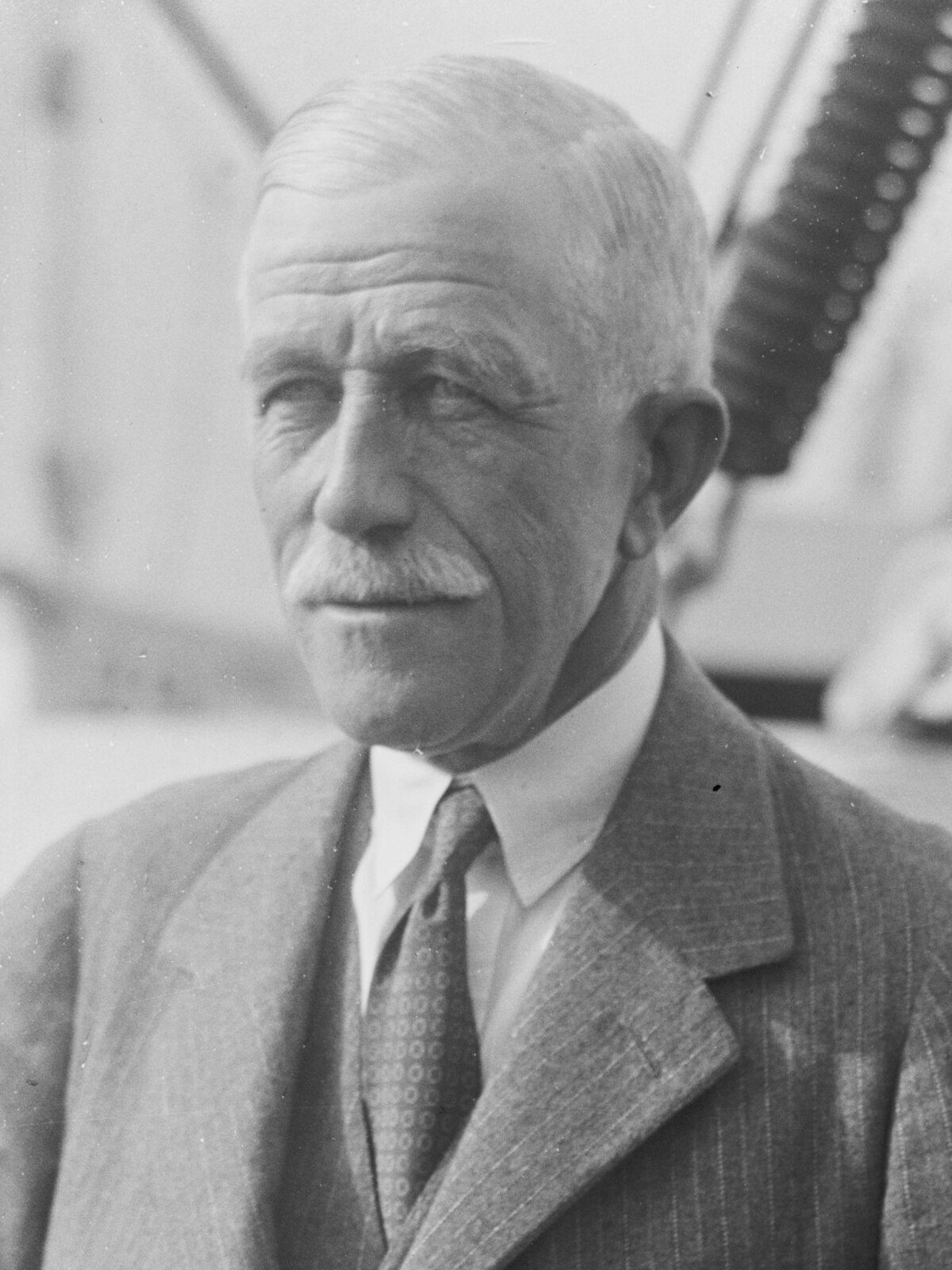
| Nominee | A. Harry Moore | Arthur Whitney |
| Party | Democratic | Republican |
| Popular vote | 471,549 | 433,121 |
| Percentage | 51.87% | 47.64% |
- County results Moore: 50–60% 70–80% Whitney: 40–50% 50–60% 60–70%
Governor before election
George Sebastian Silzer
Democratic
Elected Governor
A. Harry Moore
Democratic

The 1925 New Jersey gubernatorial election was held on November 3, 1925. Democratic Jersey City Commissioner A. Harry Moore defeated Republican State Senator Arthur Whitney with 51.87% of the vote.

Primary elections were held in June. Whitney defeated former New Jersey Attorney General Thomas F. McCran and judge Cornelius Doremus.

== Democratic primary ==
=== Candidates ===
- A. Harry Moore, Jersey City Commissioner

=== Results ===
1925 Democratic gubernatorial primary
| Party | Candidate | Votes | % |
|---|---|---|---|
| Democratic | A. Harry Moore | 105,330 | 84.64% |
| Write-in | | 19,108 | 15.36% |
| Total votes | | 124,438 | 100.00% |
| Democratic | Rejected ballots | 1,471 | |
| Turnout | | 125,909 | |

== Republican primary ==
=== Candidates ===
- Cornelius Doremus, former judge from Ridgefield
- Thomas F. McCran, former New Jersey Attorney General (1919–24) and State Senator for Passaic County
- Arthur Whitney, State Senator for Morris County

=== Campaign ===
McCran had the support of Senator Walter Evans Edge and much of the state party establishment. Whitney was supported by the prohibitionist Anti-Saloon League.

Establishment support for McCran was so strong that the party moved its primary from September to June, apparently to advantage McCran. Nevertheless, Whitney remained confident, expressing, "the Republican voters will repudiate the boss-ridden machine supporting my opponent."

The third candidate in the race, judge Cornelius Doremus, ran as an ardent supporter of Prohibition. Near the end of the campaign, he wrote a public letter to Assistant Secretary of the Treasury Lincoln C. Andrews, congratulating him on his work to disrupt rum smuggling in the Atlantic Ocean.

Whitney accused Doremus, a former Democrat, of trying to draw prohibitionist votes away from his campaign and of being in league with McCran and the state party. On the night before the primary, he declared, "They are in flagrant combination against me."

=== Fundraising ===
Primary campaign finance activity through June 15, 1925
| Candidate | Raised | Spent | Cash on hand |
|---|---|---|---|
| Cornelius Doremus | $22,720 | $18,082.82 | $4,637.18 |
| Thomas McCran | $17,445 | $16,169.17 | $1,275.83 |
| Arthur Whitney | $49,470 | $37,082.18 | $12,387.82 |

The primary spending limit under the law at the time was $50,000. Senator Edge contributed $5,000 to McCran's campaign, and McCran contributed the same amount himself. Whitney and Doremus contributed the bulk of their own campaign funds, at $42,000 and $19,350 respectively.

=== Results ===
Whitney won the primary by around 27,000 votes over McCran, with Doremus around another 43,000 votes behind McCran's total.

1925 Republican gubernatorial primary
| Party | Candidate | Votes | % |
|---|---|---|---|
| Republican | Arthur Whitney | 155,248 | 42.67% |
| Republican | Thomas F. McCran | 123,262 | 33.88% |
| Republican | Cornelius J. Doremus | 59,593 | 16.38% |
| Write-in | | 25,753 | 7.08% |
| Total votes | | 363,856 | 100.00% |
| Republican | Rejected ballots | 2,863 | |
| Turnout | | 366,719 | |

=== Aftermath ===
Thomas McCran died in September.

== General election ==
=== Candidates ===
- John C. Butterworth (Socialist Labor)
- Leo M. Harkins (Socialist)
- A. Harry Moore, Jersey City Commissioner (Democratic)
- Eugene A. Smith (Prohibition)
- George Perlman (Workers)
- Joseph Ferguson (Commonwealth Land)
- Arthur Whitney, State Senator for Morris County (Republican)

=== Campaign ===
For the third straight election, the campaign was split between prohibitionist Republicans and anti-Prohibition Democrats, and for the third straight election, the Democratic candidate won.

=== Results ===
New Jersey gubernatorial election, 1925
| Party | Candidate | Votes | % | ±% |
|---|---|---|---|---|
| Democratic | A. Harry Moore | 471,549 | 51.87% | –0.32% |
| Republican | Arthur Whitney | 433,121 | 47.64% | +0.82% |
| Socialist | Leo M. Harkins | 1,956 | 0.22% | –0.47% |
| Prohibition | Eugene A. Smith | 1,198 | 0.13% | N/A |
| Socialist Labor | John C. Butterworth | 594 | 0.07% | N/A |
| Independent | George Perlman | 591 | 0.07% | N/A |
| Independent | Joseph Ferguson | 153 | 0.02% | N/A |
| Total votes | | 909,162 | 100.00% | |
| Majority | | 38,428 | 4.23% | –1.14% |
| Turnout | | 909,162 | 69.47% | |
| Registered electors | | 1,308,674 | | |
| Democratic hold | | Swing | –0.57% | |

=== Results by county ===
| County | Moore | | Whitney | | Others | | Total | Margin | |
| County | Votes | Percent | Votes | Percent | Votes | Percent | Votes | Votes | Percent |
|---|---|---|---|---|---|---|---|---|---|
| Atlantic | 13,207 | 41.06% | 18,739 | 58.25% | 221 | 0.69% | 32,167 | -5,532 | -17.19% |
| Bergen | 33,507 | 42.42% | 45,013 | 56.98% | 472 | 0.60% | 78,992 | -11,506 | -14.56% |
| Burlington | 8,473 | 37.42% | 14,111 | 62.32% | 60 | 0.26% | 22,644 | -5,638 | -24.90% |
| Camden | 22,525 | 41.40% | 31,431 | 57.77% | 448 | 0.83% | 54,404 | -8,906 | -16.37% |
| Cape May | 3,311 | 37.58% | 5,470 | 62.09% | 29 | 0.33% | 8,810 | -2,159 | -26.10% |
| Cumberland | 5,475 | 33.71% | 10,675 | 65.73% | 90 | 0.56% | 16,240 | -5,200 | -32.02% |
| Essex | 65,158 | 49.64% | 65,449 | 49.86% | 661 | 0.50% | 131,268 | -291 | -0.22% |
| Gloucester | 5,901 | 34.54% | 11,008 | 64.42% | 178 | 1.04% | 17,087 | -5,107 | -29.88% |
| Hudson | 152,582 | 75.54% | 48,587 | 24.05% | 828 | 0.41% | 201,997 | 103,995 | 51.49% |
| Hunterdon | 5,393 | 45.50% | 6,418 | 54.14% | 43 | 0.36% | 11,854 | -1,025 | -8.64% |
| Mercer | 19,276 | 49.22% | 19,801 | 50.56% | 88 | 0.22% | 39,165 | -525 | -1.34% |
| Middlesex | 26,873 | 52.99% | 23,672 | 46.67% | 173 | 0.34% | 50,718 | 3,201 | 6.32% |
| Monmouth | 20,390 | 46.26% | 23,618 | 53.58% | 73 | 0.16% | 44,081 | -3,228 | -7.32% |
| Morris | 12,284 | 39.41% | 18,748 | 60.14% | 137 | 0.44% | 31,169 | -6,464 | -20.73% |
| Ocean | 4,116 | 37.79% | 6,744 | 61.92% | 31 | 0.29% | 10,891 | -2,628 | -24.13% |
| Passaic | 28,791 | 51.66% | 26,421 | 47.41% | 517 | 0.93% | 55,729 | 2,370 | 4.25% |
| Salem | 3,813 | 37.37% | 6,324 | 61.99% | 65 | 0.64% | 10,202 | -2,511 | -24.62% |
| Somerset | 6,835 | 41.73% | 9,506 | 58.03% | 40 | 0.24% | 16,381 | -2,671 | -16.30% |
| Sussex | 4,354 | 47.20% | 4,836 | 52.43% | 34 | 0.37% | 9,224 | -482 | -5.23% |
| Union | 23,552 | 43.94% | 29,813 | 55.62% | 239 | 0.44% | 53,604 | -6,261 | -11.68% |
| Warren | 5,733 | 45.74% | 6,737 | 53.74% | 65 | 0.52% | 12,535 | -1,004 | -8.00% |
| Total | 471,549 | 51.87% | 433,121 | 47.64% | 4,492 | 0.49% | 909,162 | 38,428 | 4.23% |
