= Thomas F. McCran =

American jurist and politician (1875-1925)

Thomas Francis McCran (December 2, 1875 – September 19, 1925) was an American jurist and Republican Party politician who served as Speaker of the New Jersey General Assembly, President of the New Jersey Senate, and Attorney General of New Jersey.

== Early life and legal career ==
McCran was born in Newark, New Jersey in 1875. He was raised in Paterson and was educated in the public schools there. He attended Seton Hall College and graduated in 1896 with a Bachelor of Science degree.

He read law in the office of former State Senator William B. Gourley in Paterson and was admitted as an attorney in 1899, becoming a counselor in 1911. He practiced in Gourley's office until 1907 before opening up an office of his own.

McCran was elected City Attorney of Paterson in 1907, holding the office until 1912. He became a counselor at law in 1911 and obtained his LL.D. from Seton Hall in 1917.

== Political career ==
In 1909 McCran was elected as a Republican member of the State Assembly from Passaic County, and he was re-elected in 1911 and 1912. He was named floor leader by the Republican minority in 1911 and the following year, when the Republicans took control of the Assembly, he was made Speaker. While serving as Assembly Speaker, his Secretary was William Wadsworth Evans, who would later represent Passaic County in the State Assembly from 1919 to 1924.

Before the expiration of his term, he was nominated by the Republicans of Passaic County for the State Senate. The Progressive Party ran a candidate in the race, splitting the Republican vote, and the Democratic candidate Peter J. McGinnis defeated McCran by a slim margin. In 1915 he ran against McGinnis again and defeated him by a plurality of more than 8,000 votes.

In 1917 Senate Republicans named McCran majority leader, and in 1918 he was selected as Senate President. He presided as Acting Governor in the absence of Governor Walter Evans Edge.

In 1919 Governor Edge appointed him to the position of Attorney General for a five-year term. On the completion of his term he sought the Republican nomination for Governor in 1925. Despite the backing of Edge (now in the United States Senate) and the regular Republican organization, McCran was defeated for the nomination by Arthur Whitney, who had the support of the Anti-Saloon League. Whitney would go on to be defeated in the general election by Democratic candidate A. Harry Moore.

== Death ==
In September 1925, three months after losing the arduous gubernatorial primary, McCran died suddenly at his home in Paterson. He was diagnosed with acute indigestion and leakage of the heart.

Political offices
Preceded by Edward Kenny	Speaker of the New Jersey General Assembly; 1912	Succeeded by Leon R. Taylor
Preceded by George W. F. Gaunt	President of the New Jersey Senate; 1918	Succeeded by William N. Runyon
Legal offices
Preceded by John W. Wescott	Attorney General of New Jersey; 1919 – 1924	Succeeded by Edward L. Katzenbach
