= 1928 New Jersey gubernatorial election =

- November 6, 1928
- Turnout: 87.32% (▲13.05%)
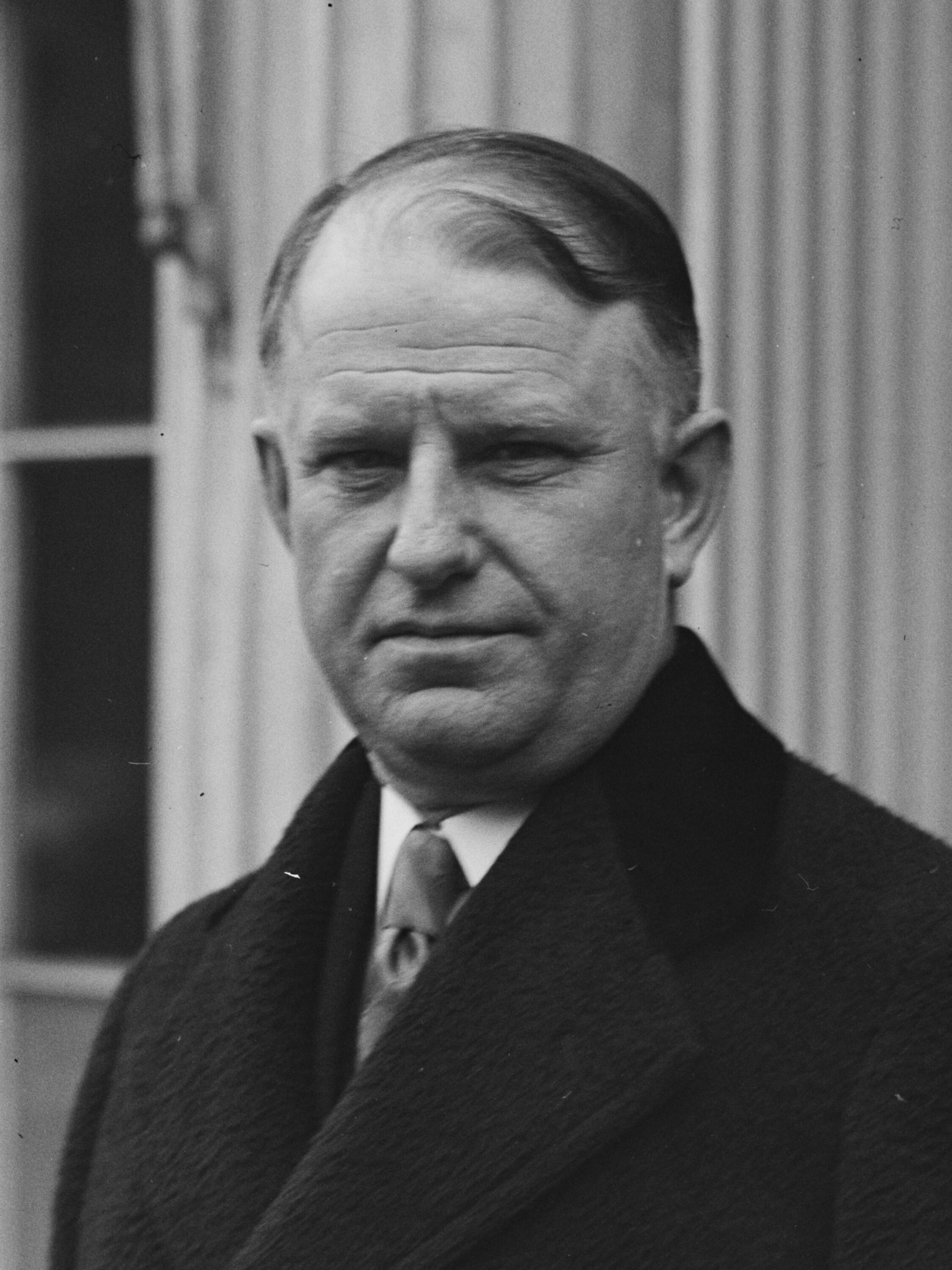

Nominee	Morgan F. Larson	William L. Dill
Party	Republican	Democratic
Popular vote	824,005	671,728
Percentage	54.88%	44.74%
- County results Larson: 50–60% 60–70% 70–80% Dill: 50–60% 60–70%
Governor before election
A. Harry Moore
Democratic
Elected Governor
Morgan Foster Larson
Republican

The 1928 New Jersey Gubernatorial Election was held on November 6, 1928. Republican nominee Morgan Foster Larson defeated Democratic nominee William L. Dill with 54.88% of the vote.

Primary elections were held on May 15, 1928. Dill was unopposed for the Democratic nomination, while Larson defeated three opponents led by reformist judge Robert Carey.

== Democratic primary ==
=== Candidates ===
- William L. Dill, Motor Vehicle Commissioner

=== Results ===
Democratic Party primary results
Party	Candidate	Votes	%
Democratic	William L. Dill	158,655	100.00
Total votes		158,655	100.00

== Republican primary ==
=== Candidates ===
- Robert Carey, Jersey City judge
- Cornelius Doremus, candidate for governor in 1925
- Morgan Foster Larson, State Senator for Middlesex County from Perth Amboy
- J. Henry Harrison, state senator for Essex County from Caldwell

=== Results ===
Republican primary results
Party	Candidate	Votes	%
Republican	Morgan Foster Larson	194,513	38.69%
Republican	Robert Carey	139,660	27.78%
Republican	J. Henry Harrison	91,888	18.27%
Republican	Cornelius Doremus	76,719	15.26%
Total votes		502,780	100.00

Following the election, Carey alleged that many Democrats, at the behest of Jersey City boss Frank Hague, crossed party lines to vote for Larson.

== General election ==
=== Candidates ===
- John C. Butterworth (Socialist Labor)
- William L. Dill, Commissioner of Motor Vehicles (Democratic)
- Morgan Foster Larson, state senator for Middlesex County (Republican)
- Scott Nearing, radical activist and former professor of economics at Toledo University (Workers)
- Eugene A. Smith (Prohibition)
- W. K. Tallman (Socialist)

=== Results ===
New Jersey gubernatorial election, 1928
Party	Candidate	Votes	%	±%
Republican	Morgan Foster Larson	824,005	54.88%	
Democratic	William L. Dill	671,728	44.74%	
Prohibition	Eugene A. Smith	2,151	0.14%	
Socialist	W. K. Tallman	2,041	0.14%	
Independent	Scott Nearing	1,255	0.08%	
Socialist Labor	John C. Butterworth	220	0.02%	
Majority				
Turnout				
Republican gain from Democratic		Swing		
