= Henry Jager =

American politician

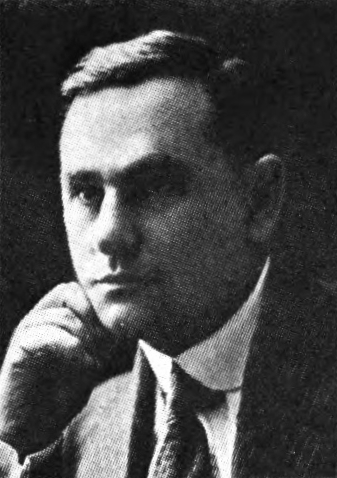
- Jager c. 1921

Member of the New York State Assembly from the 14th Kings district
- In office January 1, 1921 – March 30, 1921
- Preceded by: Joseph Lentol
- Succeeded by: Andrew B. Yacenda

Personal details
- Born: 1879 Kingdom of Romania
- Died: 1952 (aged 72–73)
- Party: Socialist
- Occupation: Real estate agent, politician

Henry Jager (1879–1952) was a Romanian-American politician from New York.

== Life ==
He emigrated from the Kingdom of Romania to the United States, and was naturalized in 1900 in New York. In 1911, he removed to Maywood, New Jersey. He engaged in the real estate business, and was active in politics as a Socialist organizer.

In April 1914, he ran on the Socialist Labor ticket for Congress at a special election in New Jersey's 7th congressional district, to fill the vacancy caused by the death of Robert G. Bremner, and polled 104 votes. He came in last, behind Dow H. Drukker (Rep.), James J. O'Byrne (Dem.), Gordon Demarest (Soc.) and Henry C. Whitehead (Progr.).

In May 1917, at a Socialist meeting in Madison Square Garden, Jager accused one Paul Strashun of testifying in court that Jager had called President Woodrow Wilson a "murderer". Strashun denied this, and was called by Jager "a perjurer, skunk and liar", for which Jager was convicted of disorderly conduct. He was sentenced to a three-month term in prison, and served the full term.

Afterwards he lived at several boarding houses in different locations in New York City, ending up in 1920 in Brooklyn, while his wife Irene remained in their home in Maywood where he spent many week-ends with her.

In November 1920, Jager was elected on the Socialist ticket to the New York State Assembly (Kings Co., 14th D.), and took his seat in the 144th New York State Legislature in 1921. On January 12, Assemblyman George H. Rowe offered a resolution contesting Jager's eligibility to office because he had called President Wilson a murderer, had served a six-month prison term, and was a resident of New Jersey. The resolution was referred to the Assembly Committee on the Judiciary, and a sub-committee was formed to investigate Rowe's claims.

On March 29, the Assembly Committee on the Judiciary presented its final report in the matter of the eligibility of Henry Jager. There was consensus that the claim that Jager had called the President a murderer was false, and that neither a conviction for disorderly conduct and a short prison term, nor membership in the Socialist Party, were barring anybody from public office. Contentious remained the question of residence: The majority submitted a report concluding that Jager was a resident of Maywood, New Jersey, and therefore was ineligible for office under the provisions of the Public Officers Law of New York. A minority concluded that Jager was a resident of Brooklyn. On the next day, Jager's seat was declared vacant by a vote of 77 to 62.

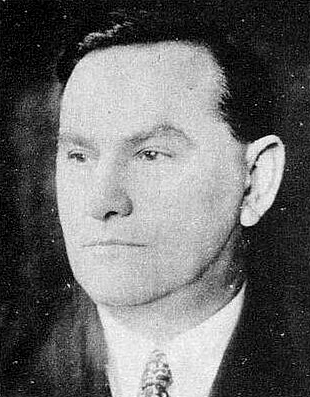
Jager as a candidate for State Assembly, 1934

After his expulsion, Jager continued to stand as a Socialist candidate for public office, running for U.S. Senate in New Jersey in 1930, New York State Assembly again in 1934, for Congress in New Jersey's 7th district again in 1936, and for governor of New Jersey in 1937.

New York State Assembly
Preceded by Joseph Lentol	New York State Assembly; Kings County, 14th District; 1921	Succeeded by Andrew B. Yacenda
