= William Nelson Runyon =

American judge (1871–1931)

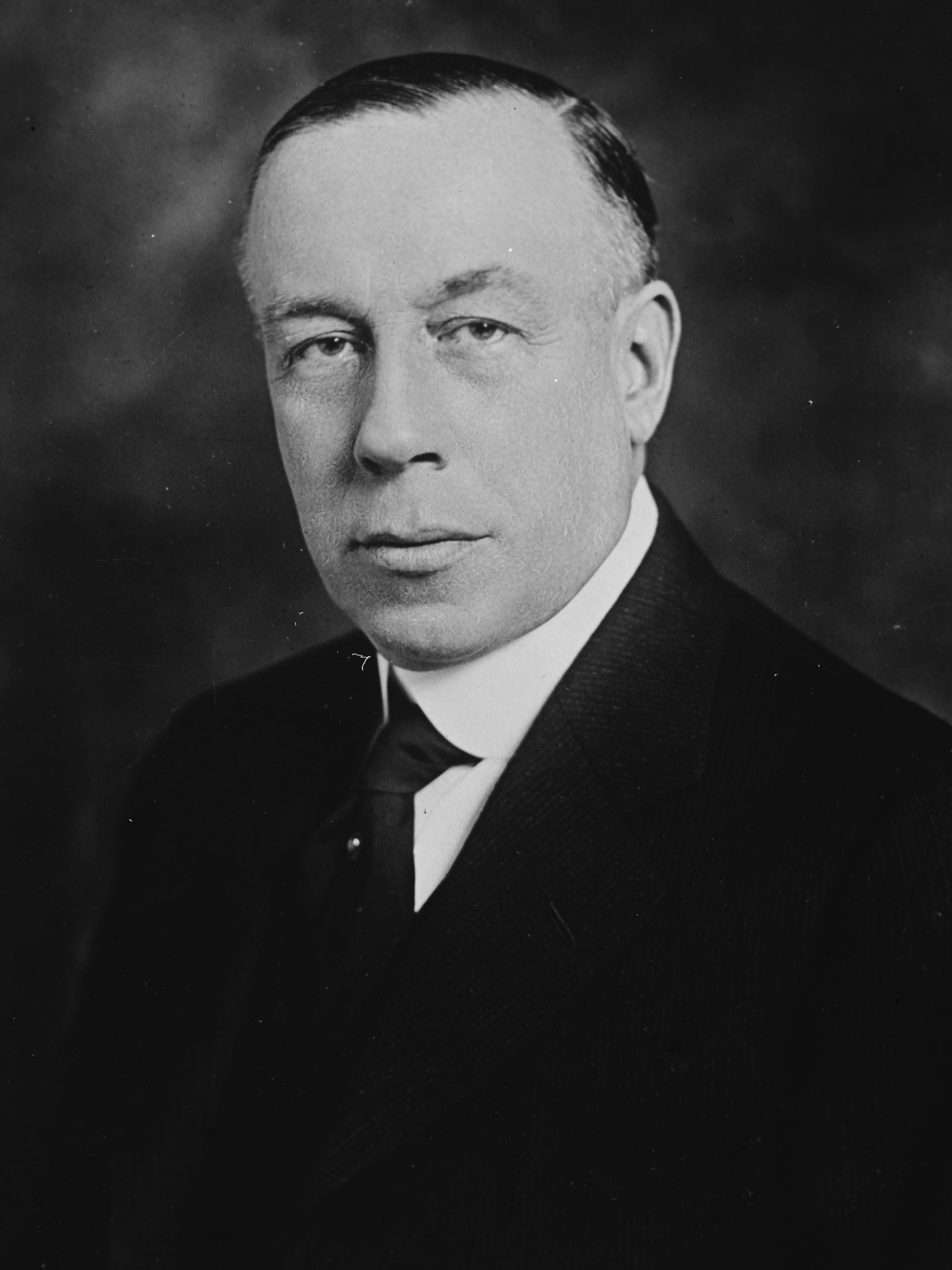
- Runyon c. 1920

Judge of the United States District Court for the District of New Jersey
- In office January 16, 1923 – November 9, 1931
- Appointed by: Warren G. Harding
- Preceded by: Seat established by 42 Stat. 837
- Succeeded by: Phillip Forman

Acting Governor of New Jersey
- In office May 16, 1919 – January 13, 1920
- Preceded by: Walter Evans Edge
- Succeeded by: Clarence E. Case (acting)

President of the New Jersey Senate
- In office 1919 – January 13, 1920
- Preceded by: Thomas F. McCran
- Succeeded by: Clarence E. Case

Member of the New Jersey Senate from Union County
- In office 1918–1922
- Preceded by: Carlton B. Pierce
- Succeeded by: Arthur N. Pierson

Personal details
- Born: William Nelson Runyon; March 5, 1871 Plainfield, New Jersey, U.S.
- Died: November 9, 1931 (aged 60) Plainfield, New Jersey, U.S.
- Resting place: Hillside Cemetery; Scotch Plains, New Jersey
- Party: Republican
- Education: Yale University (A.B.); New York Law School (LL.B.)

William Nelson Runyon (March 5, 1871 – November 9, 1931) was the acting governor of New Jersey from 1919 to 1920 and a United States district judge of the United States District Court for the District of New Jersey.

Runyon was nominated by President Warren G. Harding on December 30, 1922, to a new seat created by 42 Stat. 837; He was confirmed by the United States Senate on January 16, 1923, and received commission the same day. Runyon's service was terminated on November 9, 1931, due to death.

== Education and career ==
Born on March 5, 1871, in Plainfield, New Jersey, Runyon received an Artium Baccalaureus degree in 1892 from Yale University and a Bachelor of Laws in 1894 from New York Law School. He was a member of the Plainfield Common Council from 1897 to 1898. He was a Judge of the Plainfield Municipal Court from 1899 to 1910. He was a member of the New Jersey General Assembly from 1915 to 1917. He was a member of the New Jersey Senate from 1918 to 1922. He served as Acting Governor of New Jersey from 1919 to 1920. He was a member of the Republican Party.

== Federal judicial service ==
Runyon was nominated by President Warren G. Harding on December 30, 1922, to the United States District Court for the District of New Jersey, to a new seat authorized by 42 Stat. 837. He was confirmed by the United States Senate on January 16, 1923, and received his commission the same day. His service terminated on November 9, 1931, due to his death in Plainfield. He was interred in Hillside Cemetery in Scotch Plains, New Jersey.

== Sources ==
- "Runyon, William Nelson - Federal Judicial Center". www.fjc.gov.
- "The Political Graveyard: Index to Politicians: Rugh to Rusen". politicalgraveyard.com.

Political offices
Preceded by Thomas F. McCran	President of the New Jersey Senate; 1919	Succeeded by Clarence E. Case
Preceded by Walter Evans Edge	Acting Governor of New Jersey; 1919–1920	Succeeded by Clarence E. Case
Party political offices
Preceded by Newton A.K. Bugbee	Republican nominee for Governor of New Jersey; 1922	Succeeded by Arthur Whitney
Legal offices
Preceded by Seat established by 42 Stat. 837	Judge of the United States District Court for the District of New Jersey; 1923–1931	Succeeded by Phillip Forman
