= 1934 New Jersey gubernatorial election =

- November 6, 1934
- Turnout: 71.07% (▲1.54%)
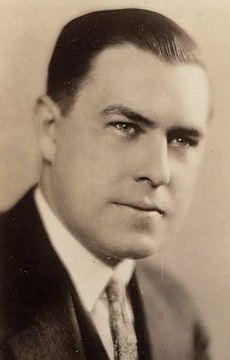

Nominee	Harold G. Hoffman	William L. Dill
Party	Republican	Democratic
Popular vote	686,530	674,096
Percentage	49.90%	49.00%
- County results Hoffman: 50–60% 60–70% Dill: 50–60% 60–70%
Governor before election
A. Harry Moore
Democratic
Elected Governor
Harold G. Hoffman
Republican

The 1934 New Jersey gubernatorial election was held on November 6, 1934. Republican nominee Harold G. Hoffman narrowly defeated Democratic nominee William L. Dill with 49.90% of the vote.

== Republican primary ==
=== Candidates ===
- Robert Carey, reformist Jersey City judge and candidate for governor in 1928 and 1931
- Harold G. Hoffman, former U.S. Representative from South Amboy
- Emerson Lewis Richards, state senator from Atlantic County since 1923
- Joseph G. Wolber, State Senator from Essex County since 1927

=== Results ===
1934 Republican gubernatorial primary
Party	Candidate	Votes	%
Republican	Harold G. Hoffman	253,728	53.36%
Republican	Robert Carey	90,979	19.13%
Republican	Joseph G. Wolber	75,850	15.95%
Republican	Emerson Lewis Richards	53,978	11.35%
Total votes		475,543	100.00%

== Democratic primary ==
=== Candidates ===
- William L. Dill, nominee for governor in 1928
- Theron McCampbell, Assemblyman from Holmdel

=== Results ===
1934 Democratic gubernatorial primary
Party	Candidate	Votes	%
Democratic	William L. Dill	253,495	88.04%
Democratic	Theron McCampbell	34,431	11.96%
Total votes		287,926	100.00%

== General election ==
=== Candidates ===
- George E. Bopp, Socialist Labor
- Morris M. Brown, Communist
- William L. Dill, Democratic
- Cornell J. Grossman, Independent
- Harold G. Hoffman, Republican
- Charles H. Ingersoll, Independent
- Leslie E. Molineaux, Prohibition
- Herman F. Niessner, Socialist

=== Results ===
New Jersey gubernatorial election, 1934
Party	Candidate	Votes	%	±%
Republican	Harold G. Hoffman	686,530	49.90%	
Democratic	William L. Dill	674,096	49.00%	
Socialist	Herman F. Niessner	8,787	0.64%	
Communist	Morris M. Brown	2,874	0.21%	
Prohibition	Leslie E. Molineaux	1,508	0.11%	
Socialist Labor	George E. Bopp	1,064	0.08%	
Independent	Charles Henry Ingersoll	528	0.04%	
Independent	Cornell J. Grossman	431	0.03%	
Majority				
Turnout				
Republican hold		Swing		
