= Christ Church Cemetery, South Amboy, New Jersey =

Cemetery in South Amboy, New Jersey

Coordinates: 40.4736°N 74.2799°W

Christ Church Cemetery is located in South Amboy, New Jersey. The cemetery is owned and operated by the Christ Episcopal Church in South Amboy. The cemetery opened in 1856 and is still accepting new burials.

== Notable burials ==
- Allie Clark (1923–2012), Major League Baseball right-fielder
- Harold G. Hoffman (1896–1954), 41st Governor of New Jersey, from 1935 to 1938 who also represented New Jersey's 3rd congressional district in the United States House of Representatives, from 1927 to 1931.
- Benjamin F. Howell (1844–1933), represented New Jersey's 3rd congressional district in the United States House of Representatives, from 1895 to 1911
