= Arthur Whitney (politician) =

American politician (1871–1942)

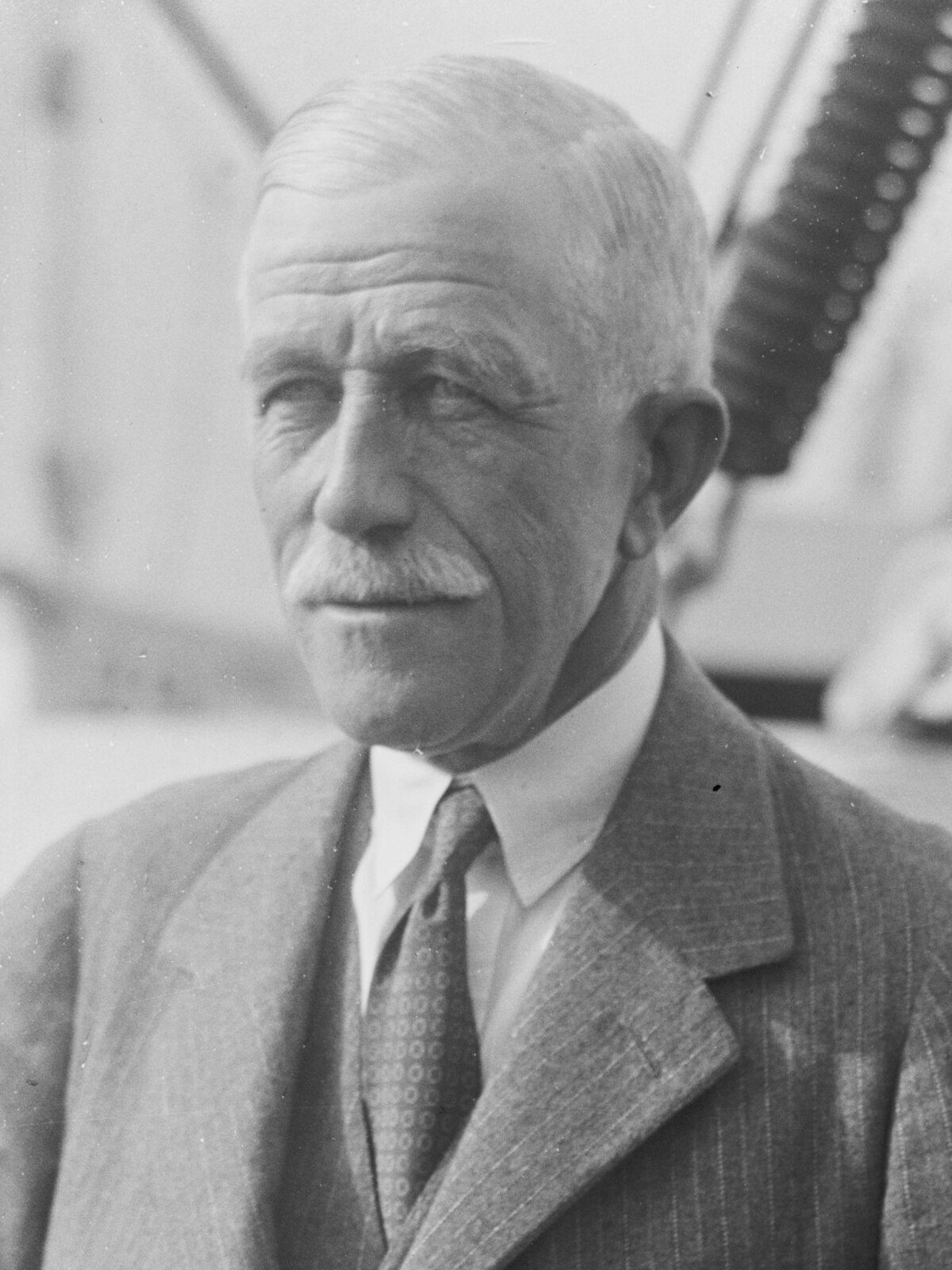

Member of the New Jersey Senate from Morris County
- In office 1919–1925
- Preceded by: Harry W. Mutchler

Member of the New Jersey General Assembly
- In office 1917–1919

Personal details
- Born: July 5, 1871 Morris Plains, New Jersey
- Died: November 19, 1942 (aged 71) Mendham Township, New Jersey
- Party: Republican
- Spouse: Florence (née Wyckoff)

Arthur Whitney (July 5, 1871 – November 19, 1942) was an American politician who served in both houses of the New Jersey Legislature and was the Republican nominee for Governor of New Jersey in 1925.

Whitney was born in 1871 in Morris Plains, to Stephen and Josephine Whitney. He was educated at St. Paul's School in Concord, New Hampshire, before leaving to work at an iron plant in Harrisburg, Pennsylvania. In 1902 he became a partner at the New York brokerage firm of Goadby & Co. He left the firm in 1916 to enter New Jersey politics.

From his base in Morris County, Whitney was elected to the New Jersey General Assembly in 1916 and was reelected the following year. He was elected to the New Jersey Senate in 1918, serving until 1925. In the Senate he was chairman of the Joint Legislative Committee on Appropriations.

Whitney won the Republican nomination for Governor of New Jersey in 1925 over former Attorney General Thomas F. McCran, who had the support of Senator Walter Evans Edge and the regular Republican organization. In the general election Whitney faced Democratic candidate A. Harry Moore. Moore ran on a "wet" anti-Prohibition platform against Whitney, who had the support of the Anti-Saloon League. The Republican campaign focused on the undue influence of Democratic party boss Frank Hague in state government. Though Moore carried only three of the state's 21 counties, Hague secured a sizable plurality of nearly 104,000 votes in his home county of Hudson, thus ensuring Whitney's defeat.

After his defeat in the gubernatorial race, Whitney retired to private life in Mendham Township. Purchased by them in 1919, he and his wife, the former Florence Wyckoff, deeded the historic Phoenix House to Mendham Borough in 1938 for use as a borough hall and community house. He died at his Mendham home in 1942 at the age of 71.

Party political offices
Preceded by William N. Runyon	Republican Nominee for Governor of New Jersey; 1925	Succeeded by Morgan Foster Larson
