= Alexander Simpson (politician) =

American politician (1872-1953)

Member of the New Jersey Senate from Hudson County
- In office 1920–1931
- Preceded by: Edward I. Edwards
- Succeeded by: Edward P. Stout

Personal details
- Born: June 12, 1872 Jersey City, New Jersey, U.S.
- Died: July 20, 1953 (aged 81) Jersey City, New Jersey, U.S.
- Party: Democratic
- Education: Jersey City High School; Columbia Law School (did not graduate)

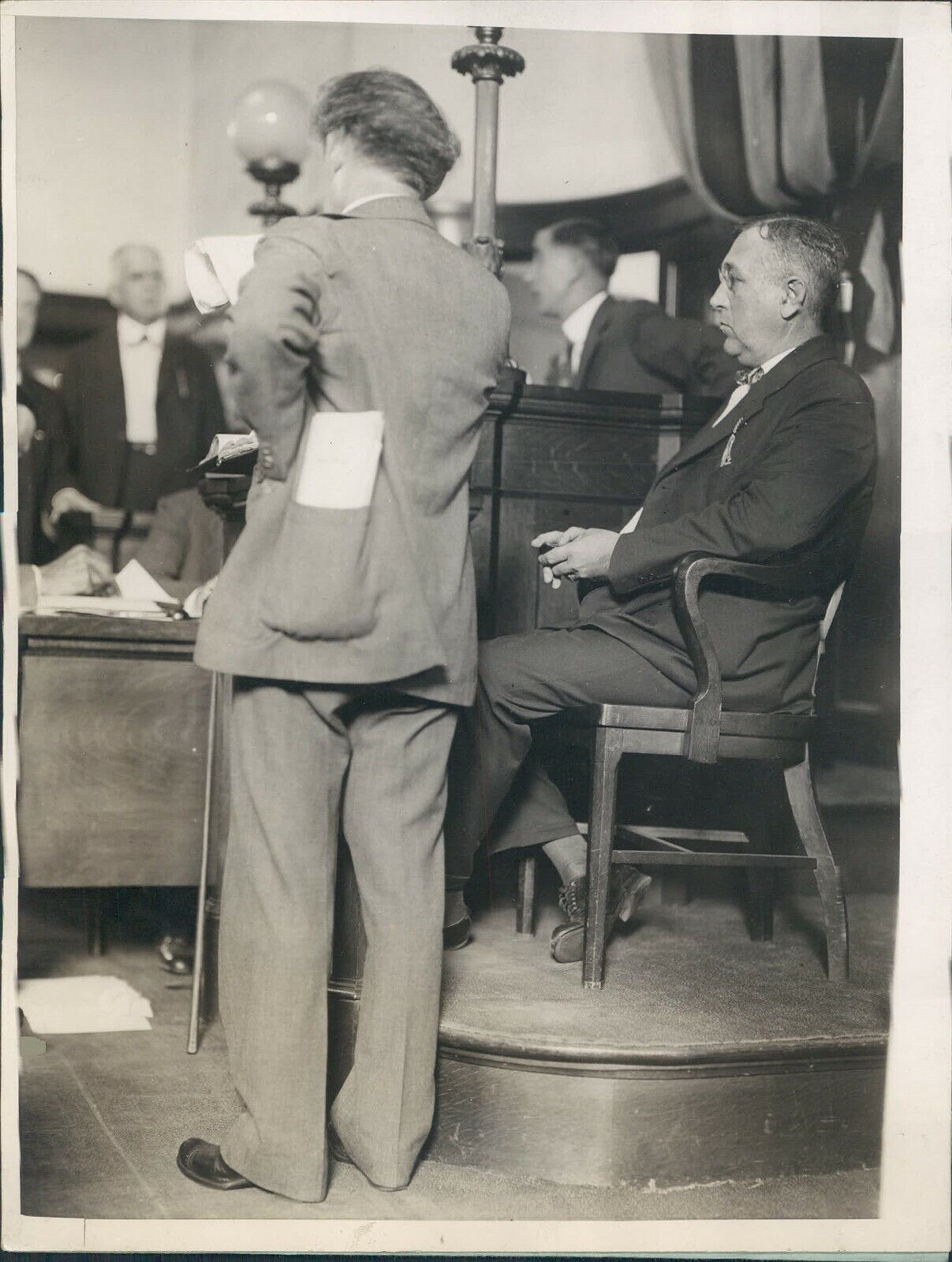
Alexander Simpson and Anthony Silzor at the Hall Mills murder trial in 1926

Alexander Simpson (June 12, 1872 – July 20, 1953) was an American journalist, attorney, and Democratic politician. He served in both houses of the New Jersey Legislature and as Assistant Attorney General of New Jersey.

== Biography ==
Simpson was born in 1872 in Jersey City, New Jersey. He graduated from Jersey City High School (now William L. Dickinson High School) and attended Columbia Law School but could not afford to complete his studies there. He worked for a judge in the court and took a second job as a reporter, working for the New York Recorder and then for the New York World and New York Globe.

Simpson started his political career as an election officer in Jersey City's First Ward. He was a member of the New Jersey General Assembly for three terms (1898, 1916, 1918); member of New Jersey state senate from Hudson County, 1920–30. In 1930, he was the Democratic candidate for United States Senate in the regularly scheduled election, unsuccessfully opposing Republican nominee Dwight Morrow.

In his position as Assistant Attorney General, Simpson achieved fame as the prosecuting attorney in the Hall-Mills Murder trial. After investigating the 1922 murder of Edward Wheeler Hall, a New Brunswick Episcopal priest, and Eleanor Reinhardt Mills, a member of Hall's choir, Simpson was assigned as a special prosecutor in 1926 in the state's case against the priest's wife and her brothers. The three defendants were never convicted and the case remained unsolved.

Simpson died in 1953 at Jersey City Medical Center at the age of 81.

Party political offices
Preceded by Frederick W. Donnelly	Democratic Nominee for the U.S. Senate (Class 2) from New Jersey; 1930	Succeeded by Percy H. Stewart
