= 1937 Cleveland mayoral election =

- November 2, 1937
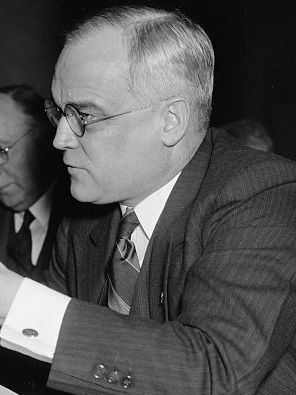

| Nominee | Harold Hitz Burton | John McWilliams |
| Party | Republican | Democratic |
| Popular vote | 144,558 | 110,026 |
| Percentage | 56.78% | 43.22% |
Mayor before election
Harold Hitz Burton
Republican
Elected mayor
Harold Hitz Burton
Republican

The Cleveland mayoral election of 1937 was held on November 2, 1937. The election resulted in the reelection of incumbent Republican candidate Harold Hitz Burton.

== General election ==
1937 Cleveland mayoral election (general election)
| Party | Candidate | Votes | % |
|---|---|---|---|
| Republican | Harold Hitz Burton (incumbent) | 144,558 | 56.78% |
| Democratic | John McWilliams | 110,026 | 43.22% |
| Turnout | | 254,584 | |
