= William H. Bright =

American politician (1863–1933)

Mayor of Wildwood
- In office 1933
- Preceded by: Robert G. Pierpont
- Succeeded by: Doris W. Bradway

56th President of the New Jersey Senate
- In office 1925
- Preceded by: Firman M. Reeves
- Succeeded by: Morgan F. Larson

Member of the New Jersey Senate from Cape May County
- In office 1919–1927
- Preceded by: Lewis T. Stevens
- Succeeded by: Charles C. Read

Sheriff of Cape May County
- In office 1904–1907
- Preceded by: Samuel E. Ewing
- Succeeded by: Robert R. Corson

Personal details
- Born: October 21, 1863 Bridgehampton Township, Michigan
- Died: August 4, 1933 (aged 69) Jefferson Hospital, Philadelphia, Pennsylvania
- Party: Republican; Progressive (1912–16)
- Children: 6, including Joy

William H. Bright (October 21, 1863 – August 4, 1933) was an American politician who represented Cape May County in the New Jersey Senate from 1919 to 1927 and served as president of the Senate in 1925.

== Personal life ==
William H. Bright was born on October 21, 1863, in Bridgehampton, Michigan to Henry and Mary (née McClintock) Bright, immigrants from the British Isles. His father came from Liverpool when he was twenty years old, and his mother immigrated with her parents from County Tyrone as a young child.

Bright attended public schools in Philadelphia. In 1882, Bright came to Wildwood, New Jersey, and started in the real estate business.

== Career ==
In 1905, Bright helped organize the First National Bank at Cape May Court House and was elected president, retaining the office until his death. He was also a director of the Marine National Bank of Wildwood.

=== Political career ===
Bright held a number of municipal, county and state positions, including being elected treasurer and tax collector of Holly Beach, sheriff of Cape May County from 1904 to 1907, and State Senator from 1919 to 1927, including Senate President in 1925. As sheriff, he focused on municipal government.

Bright was a delegate to the 1912 Republican National Convention, where he supported Theodore Roosevelt and was one of the delegates who left the convention hall to establish the rival 1912 Progressive National Convention. He was also a delegate at-large to the 1916 Progressive National Convention. He was also a delegate to the Republican conventions of 1916 and 1920.

Bright also served as Mayor of Wildwood until his death.

== Personal life and death ==
Bright married Priscilla F. Buck on December 27, 1892, in Stony Run, Pennsylvania. They had six children, including Joy Bright Hancock, one of the first women commissioned as an officer in the United States Navy.

He died on August 5, 1933, in Wildwood.

Political offices
| Preceded by Firman M. Reeves | President of the New Jersey Senate; 1925 | Succeeded by Morgan F. Larson |
