= 1937 New Jersey gubernatorial election =

- November 2, 1937
- Turnout: 70.20% (▼0.87%)
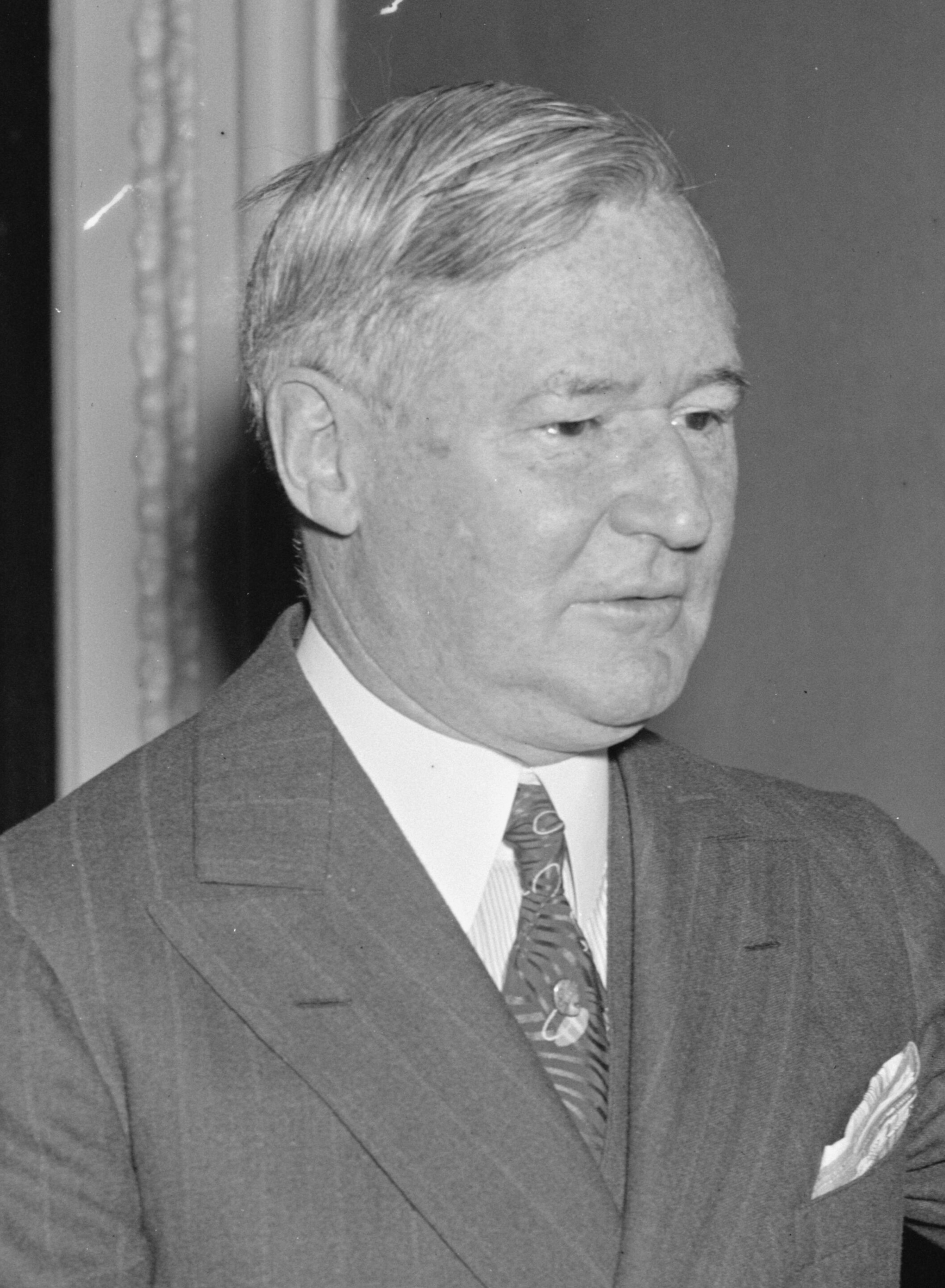

Nominee	A. Harry Moore	Lester H. Clee
Party	Democratic	Republican
Popular vote	746,033	700,767
Percentage	50.84%	47.75%
- County results Moore: 40–50% 50–60% 60–70% 70–80% Clee: 40–50% 50–60% 60–70%
Governor before election
Harold G. Hoffman
Republican
Elected Governor
A. Harry Moore
Democratic

The 1937 New Jersey gubernatorial election was held on November 2, 1937. Democratic nominee A. Harry Moore defeated Republican nominee Lester H. Clee with 50.84% of the vote.

Primary elections were held on September 21, 1937. Clee defeated Clifford Ross Powell of Burlington County, who had the support of incumbent governor Harold G. Hoffman, for the Republican nomination. Moore was unopposed for the Democratic nomination.

== Republican primary ==
=== Candidates ===
- Lester H. Clee, state senator from Essex County and former Speaker of the Assembly
- Clifford Ross Powell, state senator from Burlington County and former Senate President (1934–35)

=== Campaign ===
Powell ran with the support of incumbent Harold G. Hoffman, while Clee ran as the representative of the "clean government" movement in Essex County.

=== Results ===
Republican Party primary results
Party	Candidate	Votes	%
Republican	Lester H. Clee	249,102	57.20
Republican	Clifford Ross Powell	186,386	42.80
Total votes		435,488	100.00

== Democratic primary ==
=== Candidates ===
- A. Harry Moore, United States Senator and former Governor

==== Withdrew ====
- Elmer H. Wene, U.S. representative from Vineland (withdrew July 15, 1937)

=== Campaign ===
On July 11, freshman South Jersey representative Elmer H. Wene joined the race as a challenger to Moore. Wene was an avid supporter of the New Deal and proposed to campaign "strictly on Roosevelt policies". Wene was supported by Moore's Senate colleague William H. Smathers, a fellow South Jerseyan and Roosevelt supporter, and Atlantic City boss Charles Lafferty. The primary was positioned as a referendum on the Roosevelt administration; although Moore and party boss Frank Hague, Moore's political patron and ally, were publicly silent on the New Deal, Hague was widely understood to oppose Roosevelt. However, Wene withdrew his candidacy within days of the announcement, after Smathers withdrew his support in favor of Moore and Lafferty announced his neutrality.

=== Results ===
Democratic primary results
Party	Candidate	Votes	%
Democratic	A. Harry Moore	295,546	100.00
Total votes		295,546	100.00

=== Aftermath ===
In 1949, Wene gained support from Hague and Moore for governor, but lost the election to Republican incumbent Alfred E. Driscoll.

== General election ==
=== Candidates ===
- John C. Butterworth (Socialist Labor)
- Frank Chandler (Communist)
- Lester H. Clee, State Senator from Essex County and former Speaker of the Assembly (Republican)
- Dinshah P. Ghadiali, proponent of chromotherapy (Independent)
- Henry Jager, former New York state assemblyman (Socialist)
- John T. Kurzowski (Independent)
- A. Harry Moore, United States Senator and former Governor (Democratic)
- James F. Murray Sr. (Anti-Hague Independent Labor)
- Eugene A. Smith (Prohibition)

=== Results ===
New Jersey gubernatorial election, 1937
Party	Candidate	Votes	%	±%
Democratic	A. Harry Moore	746,033	50.84%	
Republican	Lester H. Clee	700,767	47.75%	
Independent	James F. Murray, Sr.	9,532	0.65%	
Prohibition	Eugene A. Smith	2,788	0.19%	
Socialist	Henry Jager	2,575	0.18%	
Communist	Frank Chandler	2,379	0.16%	
Independent	John T. Kurzowski	1,417	0.10%	
Independent	Dinshah P. Ghadiali	1,264	0.09%	
Socialist Labor	John C. Butterworth	759	0.05%	
Majority				
Turnout				
Democratic gain from Republican		Swing		
