= Lester H. Clee =

American politician

The Reverend Lester H. Clee

Member of the New Jersey Senate from Essex County
- In office 1936–1939
- Preceded by: Joseph G. Wolber
- Succeeded by: Homer C. Zink

Personal details
- Born: July 1, 1888 Thompsonville, Connecticut
- Died: March 15, 1962 (aged 73) Princeton, New Jersey
- Party: Republican

Lester Harrison Clee (July 1, 1888 – March 15, 1962) was an American clergyman and politician who served in both houses of the New Jersey Legislature and was the Republican nominee for Governor of New Jersey in 1937.

== Biography ==
Clee was born in 1888 in Thompsonville, Connecticut, to Frederick and Margaret (Kelley) Clee. At a young age he was forced by his father's illness to go to Worcester, Massachusetts, to work in a steel mill. He started a boys' club among his fellow mill workers and in 1908 began working for the Young Men's Christian Association in Quincy, Massachusetts. Clee married Katherine Steele on August 9, 1911.

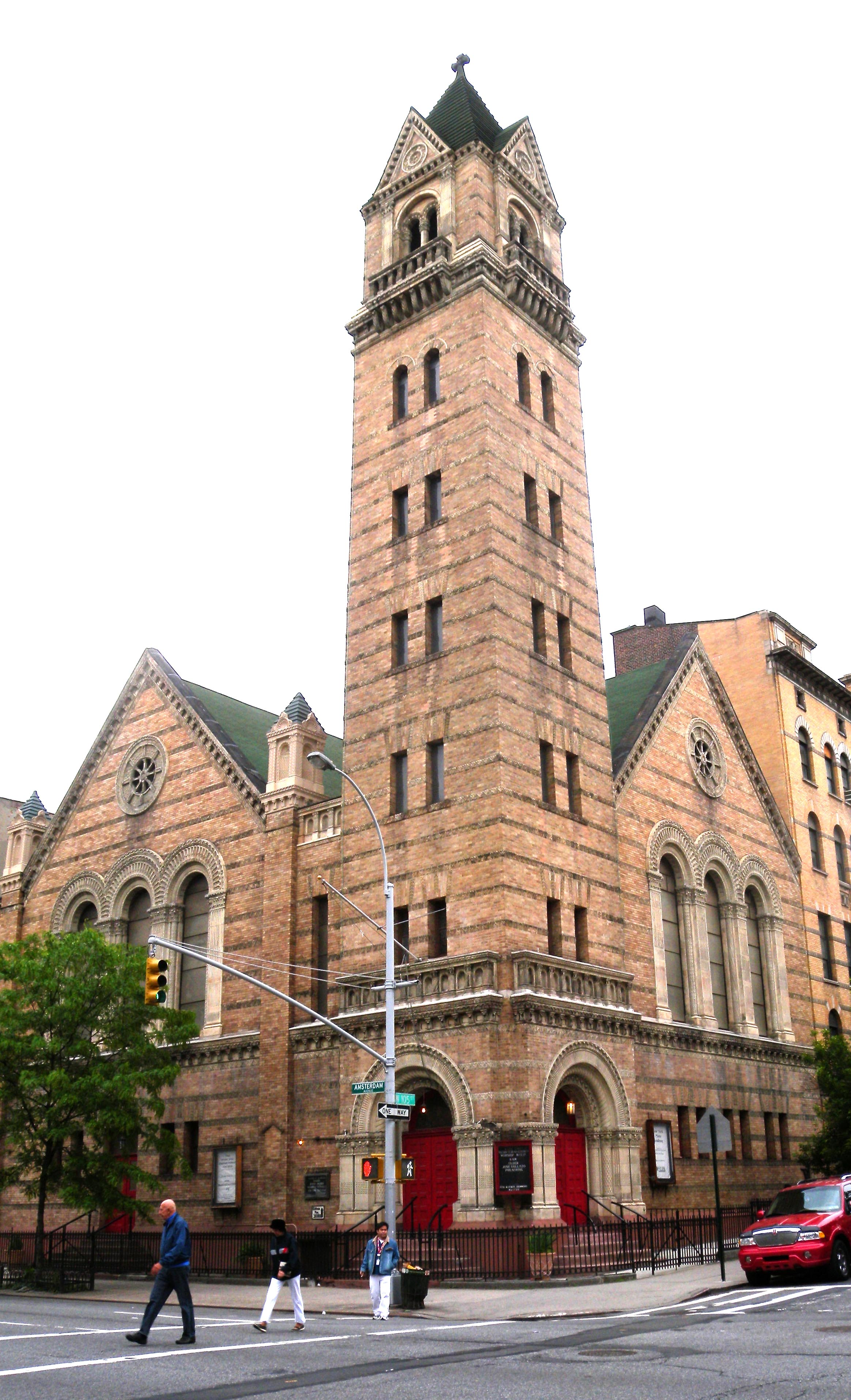
West End Presbyterian Church

Clee educated himself for the ministry while serving as assistant to the pastor of West End Presbyterian Church in New York City from 1918 to 1921. His first pastorate was at the Rutherford Baptist Church in Bergen County, New Jersey, from 1921 to 1926, after which time he became pastor of the Second Presbyterian Church in Newark, New Jersey. He served as pastor at the Newark church for nearly 25 years before retiring in 1950.

Clee was elected to the New Jersey General Assembly in 1934 on the Essex County Clean Government ticket. The following year he briefly served as Speaker of the Assembly before being elected to the New Jersey Senate.

In 1937 he became the Republican nominee for Governor of New Jersey against the Democratic candidate A. Harry Moore. Clee carried 15 of the state's 21 counties, but Moore won the election thanks to an overwhelming plurality of more than 45,000 votes in his home county of Hudson. The Hudson returns were widely suspected to be fraudulent, the result of political boss Frank Hague's tight control on the county's electoral process.

Clee later served as chairman of the State Mediation Board under Governor Alfred E. Driscoll, and was also president of the State Civil Service Commission and a member of the State Parole Board. He moved to Chester Borough in 1950 and served as Borough Councilman and later as Mayor of Chester Borough, New Jersey. He moved to Princeton in 1954. His wife died in January 1954, and the following year he married Madeleine Dreier.

Clee successfully petitioned for continuance of Bloomfield College and Seminary (now Bloomfield College) before the General Assembly of the Presbyterian Church, with which it is affiliated. He served as a trustee and acting president of Bloomfield College from 1959 to 1960. A dormitory, Clee Hall, was erected in his honor in 1961.

Clee died in 1962 in Princeton, New Jersey, at the age of 73.

Political offices
Preceded by Joseph Altman	Speaker of the New Jersey General Assembly; 1935	Succeeded by Marcus W. Newcomb
Party political offices
Preceded by Harold G. Hoffman	Republican Nominee for Governor of New Jersey; 1937	Succeeded by Robert C. Hendrickson
