= 1937 Colombian parliamentary election =

Congresisonal elections were held in Colombia on 4 April 1937 to elect the Chamber of Representatives. The Liberal Party was the only party to contest the elections, and received 100% of the vote.

== Results ==
| Party | Votes | % | Seats |
|---|---|---|---|
| Colombian Liberal Party | 550,726 | 100.00 | 118 |
| Total | 550,726 | 100.00 | 118 |
Source: Nohlen, Abente et al.
