= J. Henry Harrison =

American politician

James Henry Harrison

Member of the New Jersey Senate from Essex County
- In office 1924–1927
- Preceded by: William H. Parry
- Succeeded by: Joseph G. Wolber

Personal details
- Born: August 13, 1878 Caldwell, New Jersey
- Died: April 2, 1943 (aged 64) Caldwell, New Jersey
- Party: Republican
- Education: Montclair High School
- Alma mater: Princeton University; New York Law School

James Henry Harrison (August 13, 1878 – April 2, 1943) was an American lawyer and politician from New Jersey.

== Early life ==
Harrison was born on August 13, 1878, in Caldwell, New Jersey, the son of George B. Harrison and Elizabeth C. Gould.

Harrison attended the Montclair High School. He then went to Princeton University, graduating from there in 1899. A year later, he became master and then headmaster of St. James School in Hagerstown, Maryland. While there, he decided to study law and entered New York Law School, graduating in 1905.

== Career ==
Harrison was admitted to the New York State Bar in 1905. He was admitted to the New Jersey state bar as an attorney in 1904, and in 1907 he was admitted as a counselor. He then became a member of the law firm Munn & Church in Newark.

A Republican, he was a member of the Republican County Committee of Essex County for several years. He was elected to the Caldwell Borough Council in 1905 and served as mayor starting in 1908. By 1913, he was a director of the Caldwell National Bank and the Essex National Bank of Montclair.

In 1911, Harrison was county counsel of Essex County. He was prosecutor of pleas for Essex County from 1917 to 1922. He was counsel of the Essex County Bar Park Commission and a member of the State Board of Bar Examiners.

In 1923, he was elected to the New Jersey Senate as a Republican, representing Essex County. He served in the Senate until 1926. He was a candidate for the Republican gubernatorial nomination in the 1928 New Jersey gubernatorial election.

He was named receiver for the Breeze Corporations, Inc. He was also a director of the Firemen's Insurance Company of Newark and the National State Bank of Newark. He was president of the New Jersey State Bar Association in 1931.

== Personal life ==
Harrison was president of Essex County Country Club, and a member of the Cannon Club, the Sons of the American Revolution, and the Princeton Club of New York. He was a member of the First Presbyterian Church of Caldwell, which was established by one of his ancestors.

Harrison died at home on April 2, 1943. He was buried in Prospect Hill Cemetery.
