= 1937 Afghan parliamentary election =

- 1937

All 111 seats in the House of the People

Parliamentary elections were held in Afghanistan in the spring of 1937.

== Electoral system ==
The bicameral parliament consisted of a 111-member House of the People, whose members were elected for three-year terms, and a House of the Notables, whose members were appointed by the king. Of the 111 seats in the House of the People, Kabul elected 26, Kandahar 16, Eastern Province 15, Qataghan and Badakshan 14, Herat 12, Mazar 11, Southern Province 9, Maimana 5 and Farah 3.

Suffrage was granted to men aged over 20, while candidates were required to be literate and aged 25–70. Civil servants were not able to stand for election. In order to vote, voters were required to travel to provincial cities where a public discussion would take place on the candidates. The electoral law required candidates to be elected by "general consent", or if there was a lack of consensus, by plurality vote.

== Results ==
21 of the incumbent members were re-elected, including five who had been members of the 1931–1934 House of the People. Aslam Khan was elected in the Mohmands area. However, although his election was confirmed by the Governor of Eastern Province, the Prime Minister disapproved of his membership of the House of the People and the governor was instructed to overturn the result.

== Aftermath ==
Abdul Ahad Wardak was appointed speaker of the House of the People.
