= 1937 Virginia lieutenant gubernatorial election =

- November 2, 1937
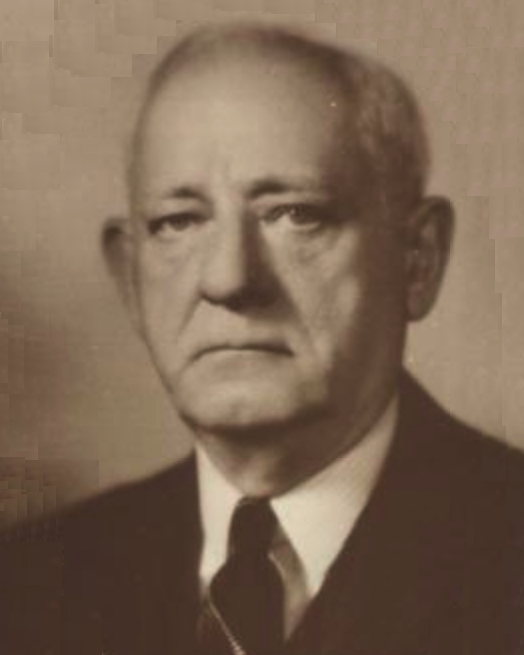

Nominee	Saxon W. Holt	Samuel A. Reynolds
Party	Democratic	Republican
Popular vote	121,919	24,758
Percentage	81.96%	16.64%
- County and independent city results Holt: 50–60% 60–70% 70–80% 80–90% >90% Reynolds: 50–60%
Lieutenant Governor before election
James Hubert Price
Democratic
Elected Lieutenant Governor
Saxon W. Holt
Democratic

The 1937 Virginia lieutenant gubernatorial election was held on November 2, 1937, in order to elect the lieutenant governor of Virginia. Democratic nominee and incumbent President pro tempore of the Senate of Virginia Saxon W. Holt defeated Republican nominee Samuel A. Reynolds and Prohibition nominee R. L. Alter.

== General election ==
On election day, November 2, 1937, Democratic nominee Saxon W. Holt won the election by a margin of 97,161 votes against his foremost opponent Republican nominee Samuel A. Reynolds, thereby retaining Democratic control over the office of lieutenant governor. Holt was sworn in as the 24th lieutenant governor of Virginia on January 20, 1938.

=== Results ===
Virginia lieutenant gubernatorial election, 1937
Party	Candidate	Votes	%
Democratic	Saxon W. Holt	121,919	81.96
Republican	Samuel A. Reynolds	24,758	16.64
Prohibition	R. L. Alter	2,085	1.40
Total votes		148,762	100.00
Democratic hold			
