= 1937 Monegasque general election =

General elections were held in Monaco on 4 July 1937 to elect five members of the National Council. The national councilmen were elected by a 30-member Electoral College.

== Electoral College ==
The 30-member Electoral College consisted of nine members elected by the Communal Council and 21 members elected by voters. It also had substitute members elected by the Communal Council and six substitute members elected by voters.

=== Members elected by Communal Council ===
The Communal Council held an election for nine members and three substitute members of the Electoral College on 12 June 1937.

	Candidates	Votes
Members	Robert Boisson	12
Members	Louis Auréglia	11
Members	Paul Bergeaud	11
Members	Édouard Giordano	11
Members	Baptiste Gastaud	10
Members	Marcel Médecin	9
Members	Roger-Félix Médecin	8
Members	Victor Rigazzi	8
Members	Michel Ravarino	7
Substitute members	Eugène Marquet	9
Substitute members	Georges Sangiorgio	8
Substitute members	Louis Settimo	8

=== Members elected by voters ===
An election of the remaining 21 Electoral College members and six substitute members was held on 13 June 1937.

	Candidates	Votes
Members	Robert Marchisio	492
Members	Arthur Crovetto	491
Members	Pierre Blanchv	490
Members	Henri Médecin	489
Members	Henri Olivié	489
Members	Joseph Raimbert	489
Members	Jules Balestra	488
Members	Étienne Destienne	488
Members	Joseph-Sadi Olivié	488
Members	Auguste Crovetto	486
Members	François Marquet	486
Members	Jean Melin	485
Members	Robert Sanmori	484
Members	Jean Campana	483
Members	Marcel Kroenlein	483
Members	Jean Scorsoglio	483
Members	Louis Briano	482
Members	Michel Porasso	482
Members	Emile Testa	482
Members	Auguste Boin	481
Members	Joseph Icardi	481
Substitute members	Joseph Bertrand	488
Substitute members	Albert Costa	488
Substitute members	Barthélemy Otto	487
Substitute members	Barthélemy Isoard	486
Substitute members	Louis Elena	485
Substitute members	Bernard Biancheri	484
Valid ballots		615
Invalid ballots		16
Total ballots		631
Registered voters		879

== National Council ==
Candidates	Votes
Louis Auréglia	30
Pierre Blanchy	30
Jean Ciaïs	30
Arthur Crovetto	30
Jean-Maurice Crovetto	30
Eugène Gindre	30
Robert Marchisio	30
François Marquet	30
Roger-Félix Médecin	30
Henri Settimo	30
Étienne Destienne	29
Marcel Médecin	29
