= Morgan Foster Larson =

American politician (1882–1961)

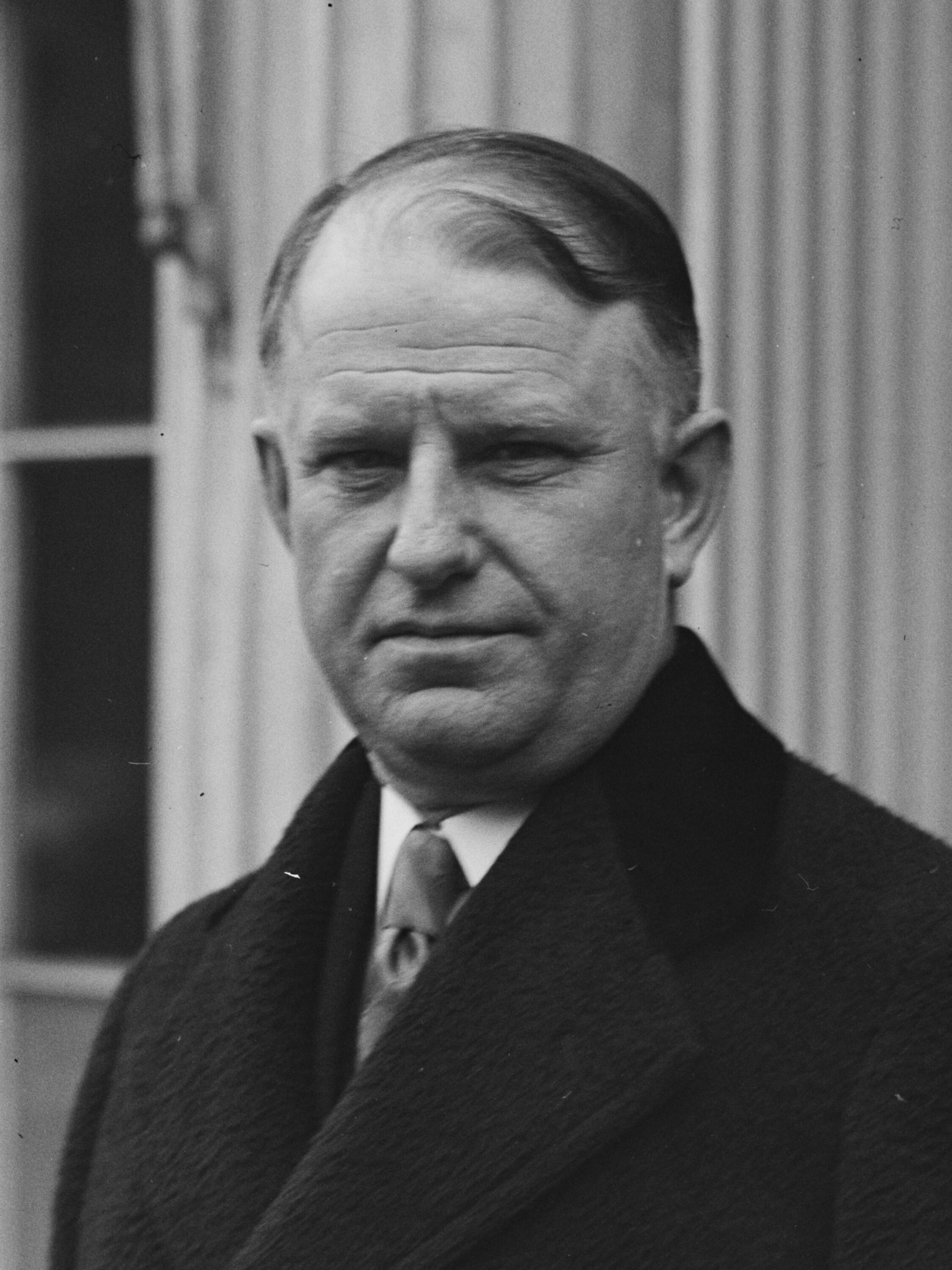
- Larson in January 1929

40th Governor of New Jersey
- In office January 15, 1929 – January 19, 1932
- Preceded by: A. Harry Moore
- Succeeded by: A. Harry Moore

1st Commissioner of the New Jersey Department of Conservation
- In office 1944 – March 1949
- Governor: Walter Evans Edge

Member of the New Jersey Senate from Middlesex County
- In office 1922–1928
- Preceded by: Thomas Brown
- Succeeded by: Arthur A. Quinn (1929)

Personal details
- Born: June 15, 1882 Perth Amboy, New Jersey, U.S.
- Died: March 21, 1961 (aged 78) Perth Amboy, New Jersey, U.S.
- Party: Republican
- Spouse(s): Jennie Brogger; Adda Schmidt

Morgan Foster Larson (June 15, 1882 – March 21, 1961) was an American Republican politician who served as the 40th governor of New Jersey.

== Early life ==
Morgan Foster Larson was born on June 15, 1882, in Perth Amboy, New Jersey, to Peter and Regina (Knudson) Larson. His father was a Danish immigrant who arrived in the United States at the age of twenty-two and worked as a blacksmith.

He attended Perth Amboy public schools before studying engineering at the Cooper Union Institute in New York City. Larson took night classes and worked in Perth Amboy during the day; by the time he graduated, he had logged over 60,000 miles of commuting.

From 1907 to 1910 and again from 1923 to 1924, Larson served as Middlesex County engineer. He also served as city engineer for Perth Amboy and township engineer for Woodbridge.

== State senator ==
In 1921, Larson was elected to his first public office as a State Senator from Middlesex County. Though Larson was a Republican, he won three terms in the normally Democratic county. In 1925, he was elevated to Senate Majority Leader, and in 1926, he became Senate President.

As Senator, Larson took a leading role in state transportation reform. The increasing popularity of automobiles in the 1920s, migration to the suburbs, and the resultant obsolescence of the New Jersey road system made transportation reform a salient popular issue. Working with Senators William B. McKay and Arthur N. Pierson of suburban Bergen and Union counties, respectively, Larson won backing for three ambitious transportation projects: the George Washington Bridge, the Outerbridge Crossing, and the Goethals Bridge.

His high profile as a leader on transportation reform also established Larson as a statewide power, enabling his climb through the Republican hierarchy and shore up his standing in his Democratic home county. As Majority Leader in 1925, he reportedly "went along with the majority of members in anything they proposed," effectively building associations with the stronger Republican leaders. He also worked to build allegiances in Middlesex, where he retained a strong personal popularity despite the partisan leanings of the county.

His greatest success as Senator was the passage of the 1927 highway system bill, which he sponsored. His bill provided for 1,700 miles of road improvements for an estimated $162 million. Perhaps more importantly, the Larson bill established a comprehensive plan for the construction of future highways, which put an end to acrimonious debates and pork-barrel highway bills that had stalled modernization.

By 1927, Larson was already seen as a potential contender for Governor. He faced a stiff challenge for re-election from Frederic M. P. Pearse. Despite a vigorous campaign, Larson handily won with the largest plurality in the history of Middlesex County.

== Governor of New Jersey ==
=== 1928 gubernatorial election ===
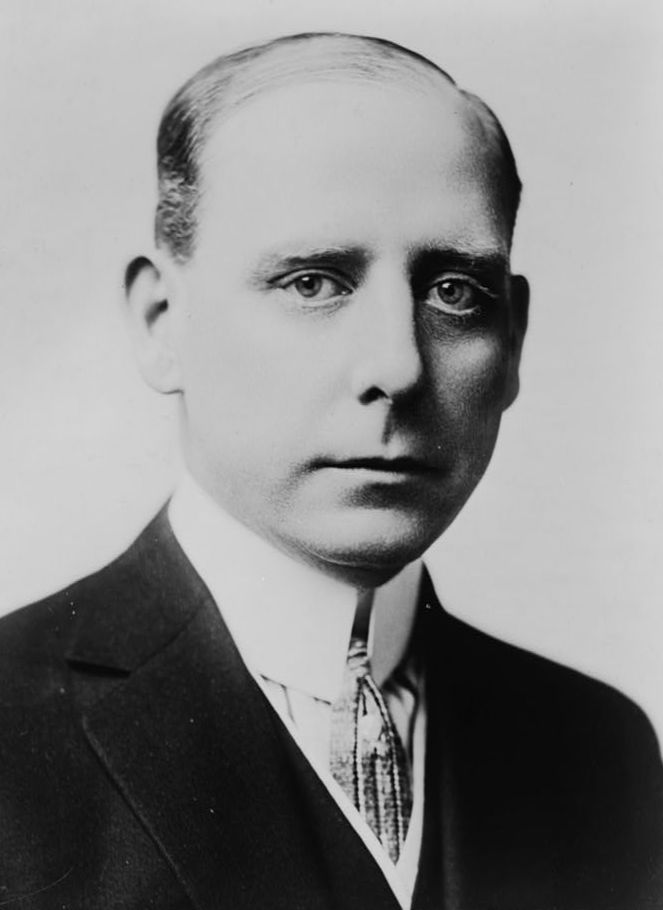
Larson received support from Jersey City boss Frank Hague in the 1928 Republican primary, which dogged Larson's fraught relationship with his own party throughout his time in office.

As the 1928 election approached, Larson was viewed as a strong potential nominee. The powerful Essex County Republican machine (and thus the state party) was divided between Senator J. Henry Harrison, a candidate for Governor himself, and Fred G. Stickley Jr.

The Republican Party faced an uphill battle in the general election as well; the Democratic Party, under the leadership of Jersey City political boss Frank Hague, had won the three previous elections. One Republican candidate, reformist judge Robert Carey of Jersey City, launched his campaign as an outright attack on Hague, promising to weaken his machine as Governor. Sensing danger, Hague backed Larson's bid for the nomination, believing that he was the weaker candidate and the lesser threat. In the May primary, twenty thousand Hudson County Democrats crossed over to vote for Larson. Larson defeated Carey by roughly 55,000 votes throughout the state.

Early in the general election campaign, Larson ran an amiable, indulgent campaign. He cited water conservation and transportation development as key issues, but did little to stimulate interest in the electorate. In late September, at the urging of Republican leaders, Larson brought Hague into the campaign again, turning the election into a referendum on "Hagueism," graft, and corruption. "If I am elected Governor," he pledged, "I will enter the Capitol at Trenton through the front door and the Hague machine will go out the back door." Though his opponent, William L. Dill, was unquestionably honest, Larson won 824,005 to 671,728. He was the first Republican elected Governor since Walter Evans Edge in 1919 and only the second since 1908, though he ran several thousand votes behind President-elect Herbert Hoover in the state. His seat in the senate was filled by state assemblyman and labor leader Arthur A. Quinn, who defeated Republican-nominee Russell Watson in a special election in 1929.

=== Term in office: 1929–1932 ===
The Larson administration was quickly plagued by internal party divisions and challenges to his authority, a consistent theme for New Jersey governors through the 1920s and 1930s. Larson in particular struggled despite his party's control of both chambers of the legislature, as he developed an early reputation as a maverick unwilling to cooperate on appointments. He became rapidly unpopular and politically ineffective shortly after taking office.

His first confrontation was over the office of Attorney General, for which he nominated Senator William A. Stevens of Monmouth without consulting leadership. He further upset state leaders by declining to nominate his primary opponent Carey for Hudson County prosecutor. The decision brewed serious controversy, re-raising the implication that Larson was insufficiently willing to attack Hague or the Hudson County machine. He followed the Carey decision by nominating his close friend and ally, Morristown mayor Clyde W. Potts, for another term on the State Board of Health. The Potts nomination outraged the legislature, given that a Senate committee had implicated Potts in a scheme to suppress competition for a state contract, in violation of state law. In response, the Governor only offered that "there didn't seem to be anything that involves his work as a member of the State Board of Health." Under mounting pressure and criticism, the Governor eventually withdrew the nomination. His final appointment in his first year was to nominate Senator Clarence E. Case to the New Jersey Supreme Court. The nomination throttled Case's Senate committee, charged with investigating impropriety in state government.

The Republican legislature spent much of the year stripping the Governor's office of authority to appoint officials, making efficient administration virtually impossible. Larson's problems compounded when the Great Depression hit the state. In September 1930, he directed the Attorney General to bring an action against alleged discriminatory freight costs in New York Harbor; the case was rejected by the Interstate Commerce Commission.

Though by now a political liability within his state, Larson's second year in office was more successful; he cooperated with Governor of New York Franklin D. Roosevelt to construct the Lincoln Tunnel. His final year in office was the most frustrating. In his third and final annual message to the legislature, Larson prioritized unemployment and called on the legislators to "meet the state's responsibility in the crisis." He backed the creation of the temporary state Emergency Relief Administration.

== Later career ==
After leaving office in 1932, Larson worked as an engineer for the Port Authority of New York and New Jersey. His financial holdings in banks, gas and petroleum collapsed as a result of the Depression.

In 1945, Governor Walter Evans Edge appointed Larson to his cabinet as commissioner of the new Department of Conservation; he remained in office until 1949. He continued on the state payroll as a consulting engineer with the Water Policy and Supply Council.

== Personal life ==
Larson married Jennie Brogger in 1914; their marriage lasted until her death in 1927. He remarried to Adda Schmidt, a native of Denmark and his mother's secretary and companion, during his second year as Governor.

In 1921, Larson's brothers Lawrence and George were killed in a grade-crossing accident. He adopted his brothers' seven children and provided each with a college education.

== Death ==
Larson died March 21, 1961, and was buried in Alpine Cemetery in Perth Amboy.

== See also ==
- List of governors of New Jersey

Political offices
Preceded by William H. Bright	President of the New Jersey Senate; 1926	Succeeded by Francis B. Davis
Preceded by A. Harry Moore	Governor of New Jersey; January 15, 1929 – January 19, 1932	Succeeded by A. Harry Moore
Party political offices
Preceded by Arthur Whitney	Republican Nominee for Governor of New Jersey; 1928	Succeeded by David Baird Jr.
