= A. Harry Moore =

American politician (1877–1952)

Arthur Harry Moore
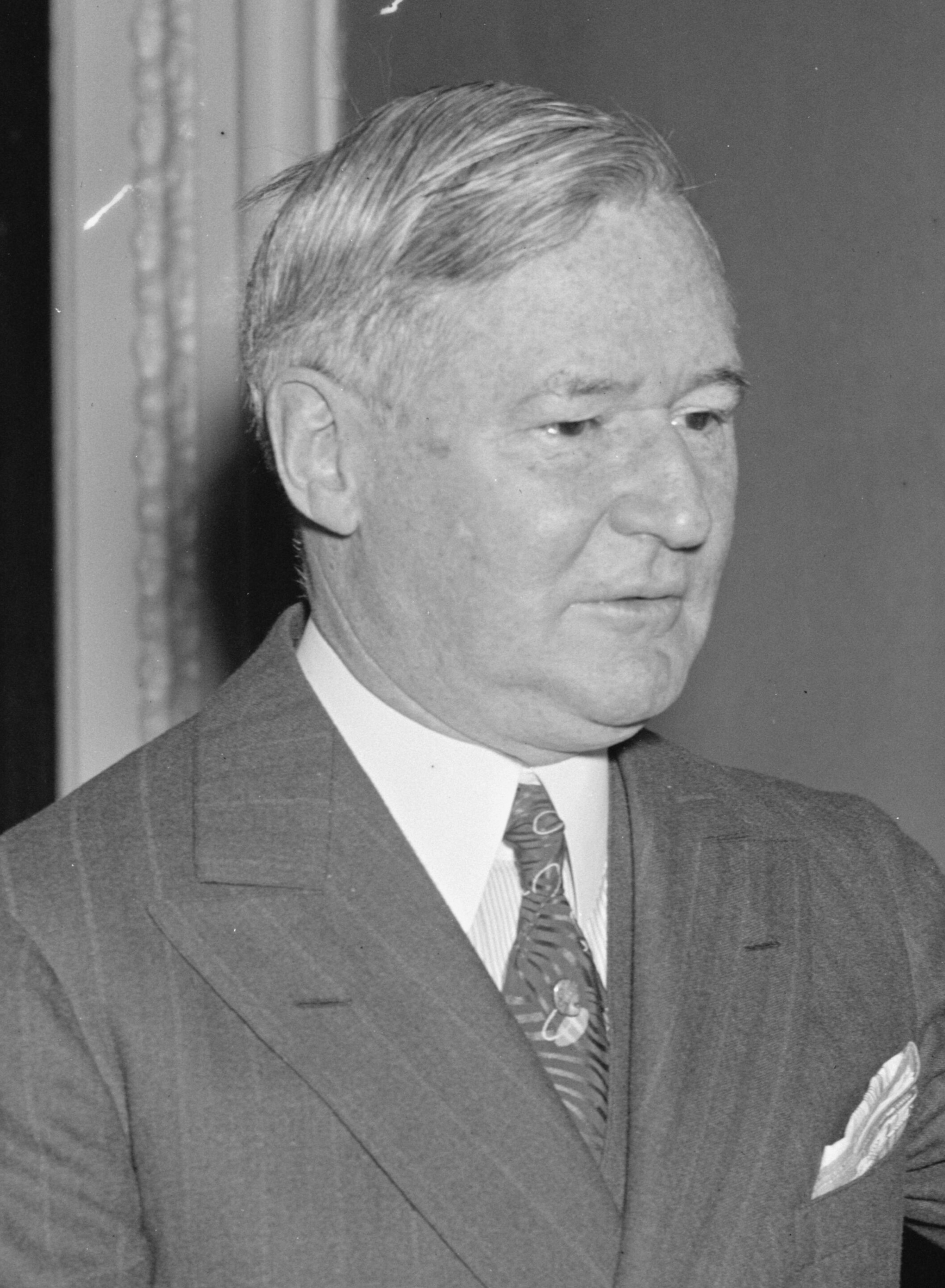
- Moore, c. 1937

39th Governor of New Jersey
- In office January 19, 1926 – January 15, 1929
- Preceded by: George Sebastian Silzer
- Succeeded by: Morgan Foster Larson
- In office January 19, 1932 – January 3, 1935
- Preceded by: Morgan Foster Larson
- Succeeded by: Clifford Ross Powell (acting)
- In office January 18, 1938 – January 21, 1941
- Preceded by: Harold G. Hoffman
- Succeeded by: Charles Edison
- In office January 3, 1935 – January 17, 1938
- Preceded by: Hamilton Fish Kean
- Succeeded by: John G. Milton

Personal details
- Born: July 3, 1877 Jersey City, New Jersey, U.S.
- Died: November 18, 1952 (aged 75) Branchburg Township, New Jersey, U.S.
- Party: Democratic
- Spouse: Jennie Hastings Stevens
- Education: Cooper Union; New Jersey Law School (LLB)

Arthur Harry Moore (July 3, 1877 – November 18, 1952) was an American attorney and politician of the Democratic Party who served three nonconsecutive three-year terms as governor of New Jersey (1926–1929, 1932–1935, and 1938–1941). He is the longest-served modern governor of New Jersey and the only one elected to three terms. (Note: "Modern" here means since 1844, when the office was first popularly elected and made independent from the legislature. Prior to 1844, the office was elected by the legislature from within its membership.) He also served a partial term as United States Senator from 1935 to 1938, before stepping down to begin his third term as governor.

== Early life ==
Arthur Harry Moore was born in the Lafayette section of Jersey City, New Jersey on July 3, 1877. His parents were Robert White Moore and Martha (née McCoomb) Moore, of Scots-Irish descent.

Moore, known as "Red," dropped out of local public schools to become a clerk at age thirteen. In his spare time, he continued his education at the Cooper Union in New York City and developed proficiency in bookkeeping and typing.

== Early political involvement ==
Moore became involved in local Democratic politics at an early age, developing a reputation for public speaking and the sobriquet, "the boy orator of Lafayette."

In 1907, Moore's longtime friend H. Otto Wittpenn was elected as mayor of Jersey City, and Moore entered City Hall as his personal secretary. In 1911, following the death of Hudson County party leader Robert Davis, Moore assumed his post as city collector.

=== Jersey City Commissioner ===
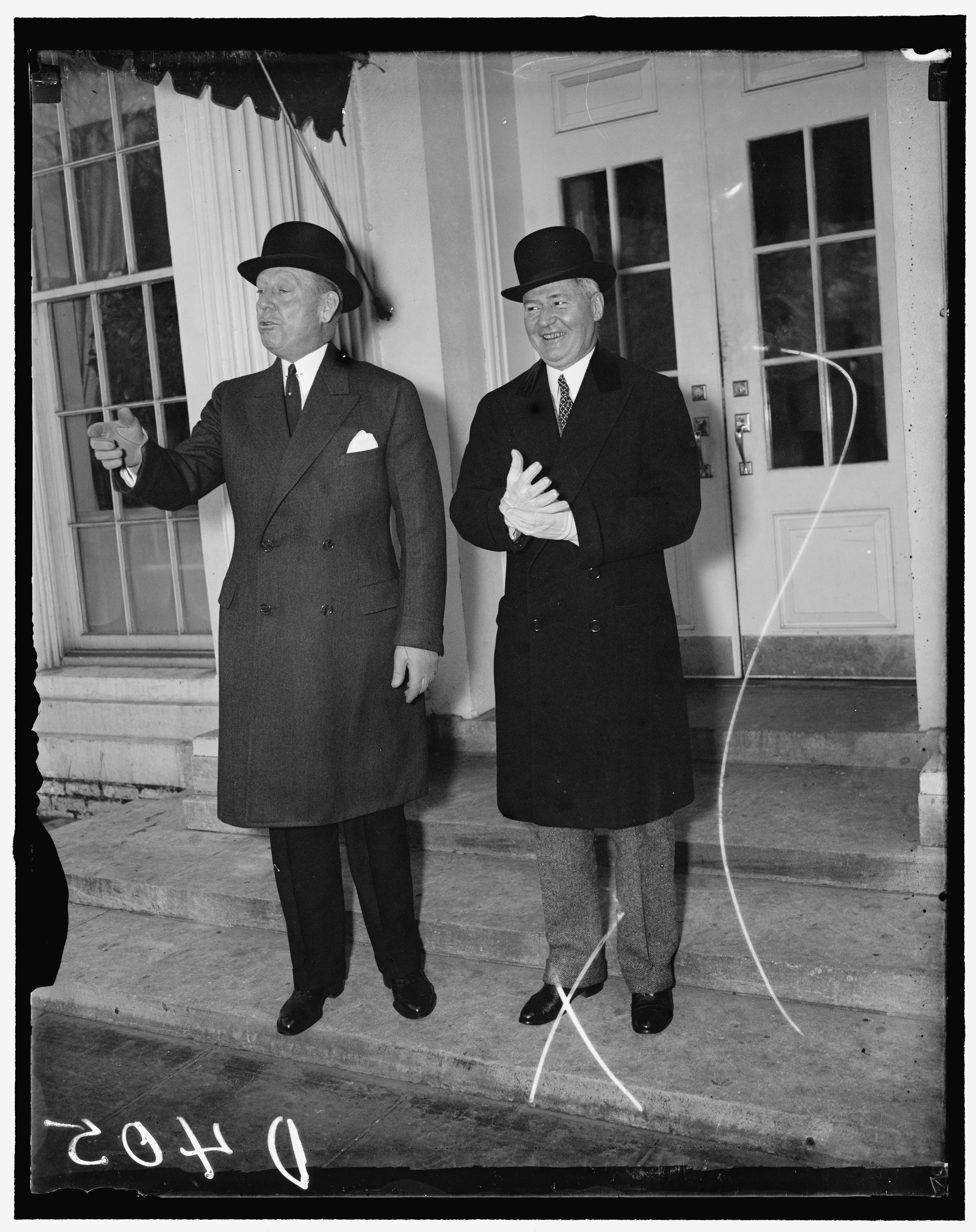
For his entire career in elected office, Moore (right) was associated with Jersey City mayor and political boss Frank Hague (left). Hague guided each of his campaigns for Governor until Moore finally refused him in 1943.

In 1913, Jersey City adopted the commission form of government, and Moore ran successfully for an inaugural seat on the five-man governing body. As director of Parks and Public Property, he promoted recreational facilities and opportunities for city youth, particularly handicapped children. In 1931, the A. Harry Moore School in Jersey City was one of the first in the United States to be designed to specifically meet the needs of handicapped children. He also formed an alliance with fellow commissioner Frank Hague which would lead both men to statewide power.

In 1916, Wittpenn unsuccessfully ran for the governorship and retired from politics. Hague ran to succeed him as mayor and Moore formalized their alliance by leading his slate of commission candidates. The Hague slate swept the 1917, 1921, and 1925 municipal elections; Hague would remain as mayor for thirty years. Moore also entered law at this period, attending evening classes at the New Jersey Law School in Newark (now Rutgers Law School). He passed the state bar exam in 1922 and received an LL.B. in 1924.

== Governor of New Jersey ==
=== 1925 election ===
As a leading figure in Jersey City, Moore was scouted as a candidate for governor as early as 1921. With Hague secure in control of the state party, he chose 1925 to secure Moore's easy nomination for governor.

Moore ran in the general election as a "wringing wet" candidate, opposed to ongoing Prohibition policies against alcohol. His opponent, Morris County state senator Arthur Whitney, ran with the support of the Anti-Saloon League. In addition to Prohibition, Republicans attacked the alleged menace of "Hagueism" in state government. On election day, Moore carried only three counties, but the 103,995 vote plurality he received in Hudson gave him a comfortable victory.

=== First term in office: 1926–1929 ===
With Hague as his benefactor, Moore's primary role as governor was to deliver patronage to the Hudson County machine. After the election, Moore told the press, "You can say for me that in patronage matters I am strictly organization." However, he had to cooperate with the New Jersey Senate, which remained strongly Republican and had broad advise and consent powers, on most appointments. This proved little trouble; Moore generally took a conservative approach and received a positive reception from the Republican legislature.

In 1927, Moore did conflict with the legislature in efforts to provide sufficient potable water for North Jersey. As a proponent of home rule, Moore recommended that municipalities resolve the problem themselves or via inter-municipal cooperation. The legislature favored a constitutional amendment authorizing regional water supply districts controlled by the state, but Moore's view won out in a November 1927 referendum.

A spot of agreement between the legislature and governor was land use control. After the United States Supreme Court decision Village of Euclid v. Ambler Realty Co., the legislature proposed that the state constitution be amended to allow municipalities to exercise zoning authority; Moore and Hague approved, campaigned for the amendment, and saw it ratified by the voters.

Moore also oversaw transportation reform efforts, led by his eventual successor Morgan F. Larson, including the establishment of a new highway construction program. Though Moore favored modernization, he vetoed a gasoline tax bill to fund the program as an undue burden on the taxpayers. The bill eventually became law, coupled with a $30 million bond issue. Under Moore's authority and with the efforts of New York governor Al Smith, New York City became more connected to New Jersey. The Holland Tunnel, Goethals Bridge, Outerbridge Crossing were dedicated, and construction began on the George Washington Bridge.

In response to rising crime and disorder, especially at night clubs, Moore called for an expansion of the state police force, which had been established in 1921. Moore also received national attention as a result of the sensational 1922 Hall-Mills murder case. In 1926, he appointed Alexander Simpson as special prosecutor. Simpson's failure to convict Frances Noel Stevens Hall and her brothers for the murder of Hall's husband and his lover was an embarrassment to Moore and the state.

=== Out of office ===
In 1928, Moore was barred from seeking a second consecutive term in office. The Hague machine was finally stalled in the election of Morgan F. Larson, though Larson's nomination was supported by Hague to block a more aggressive anti-machine candidate, Robert Carey. With Herbert Hoover atop the ticket, Republicans won a landslide in New Jersey.

Larson's victory had a silver lining for Moore; when the Great Depression hit the state in 1929, the Republican Party was in complete control of the state and received the blame for the economic collapse that followed. Moore maintained a public profile during Larson's term in office, following a rigorous speaking schedule, continuing his involvement in fraternal organizations, and hosting a weekly radio program on station WOR. By the end of 1930, Moore had established himself as the obvious choice for governor in 1931.

=== 1931 election ===
By 1931, Moore was a polished campaigner. He emphasized patriotic and religious themes ("the broad generalities of the eternal verities") and added amusing and emotional anecdotes. He focused his attacks on President Hoover and Governor Larson, blaming them for the ongoing economic misery. To counter, Republican nominee David Baird Jr. resorted to accusations of "Hagueism."

In a much improved showing, Moore carried all but four counties; Baird received a majority only in his native Camden. Moore's plurality of 230,053 votes and 57.8% of the vote were the largest yet recorded in the state's history.

=== Second term: 1932–1935 ===
Year	Appropriations
1931	$34.5M
1932	$28.3M
1933	$19.7M
1934	$20.7M

Moore's second term in office was focused on economic recovery. He maintained his conservative approach, calling for the reduction or postponement of expenditures to enable local governments and the private sector to regenerate. The 1932 legislature gave him discretionary power to curb spending, and he dramatically reduced appropriations from $34.5MM to $20.7MM by 1934. He reduced funding for state programs, especially highway construction, in favor of municipal aid and direct relief to the impoverished.

His second term drew Moore's philosophy into conflict with Franklin D. Roosevelt's New Deal program, which called for greater government spending and a firmer role for government authority in the regulation of the economy. Nevertheless, Moore vigorously lobbied to ensure that New Jersey receive its share of public works projects and federal relief funds.

Moore attempted to take advantage of the emergency to reorganize state and local government but was unsuccessful. He offered proposals to overhaul state courts, to add a home rule amendment to the constitution, to place state bureaucracy under firmer executive control, and to adopt a sales or income tax as a permanent revenue base. His only successful proposal was a statute to modernize municipal finance.

Moore was also tasked with implementing the new Alcoholic Beverage Control Commissions, designed to preserve some elements of Prohibition after its national repeal.

As in his first term, Moore was involved in overseeing a high-profile criminal case: the kidnapping of Charles A. Lindbergh Jr. from East Amwell. Lindbergh Jr. was the son of famed aviator Charles Lindbergh and the grandson of the late U.S. Senator Dwight Morrow. The case instantly received international attention. Moore also personally directed rescue efforts off Perth Amboy after the sinking of the SS Morro Castle in 1934.

== United States Senator: 1935–1938 ==
=== 1934 election ===
Alongside his gubernatorial duties, Moore ran for the United States Senate in 1934 at Hague's insistence. Despite a strong year for New Jersey Republicans, which included the election of Harold G. Hoffman as Moore's successor, Moore was easily elected to Washington.

=== Term in office ===
Moore spent only three years in Washington; they were largely unhappy. He referred to the Senate as "a cave of winds" and was ill at ease as a partisan supporter of the New Deal, especially as President Roosevelt pursued more welfare state programs. He voted against the Social Security Act (the lone Democrat to do so), the public utility holding company bill, and the 1935 amendments to the Agricultural Adjustment Act and opposed the Judicial Procedures Reform Bill of 1937.

His focus remained bringing federal projects to New Jersey and Jersey City in particular, including Jersey City Medical Center and Roosevelt Stadium.

== Third term as Governor: 1938–1941 ==
=== 1937 election ===
In 1937, Moore accepted Hague's invitation to run for the governorship a third time. His opponent was Reverend Lester H. Clee of Essex County, a relative of Moore's by marriage. Despite the candidates' personal acquaintance, the 1937 election was bitter and hard-fought. Moore defended himself from charges that he was opposed to the New Deal and Roosevelt; he survived thanks to another large plurality from Hudson County.

Clee alleged voter fraud, a claim which would hang over Moore's final term. Hague stymied various court cases and efforts by the state legislature to investigate the claims. In 1940, when an investigating committee of the United States Senate attempted to reopen the controversy, it discovered that the Hudson County poll books had been burned.

=== Term in office ===
During Moore's final term in office, his principal concern was again economic recovery. Moore continued to divert road funds toward direct relief, especially work relief in the form of federally subsidized highway and water facility projects. In 1939, he attempted to pass a $60-million highway bond issue; the Republican legislature instead opted for a $21-million issue which was ratified by voter referendum.

Moore also promoted tax reform as railroad taxes, a major source of revenue for over a century, declined. Moore proposed a broad-based replacement tax but the legislature, believing that new taxes would weaken the recovery, opposed him. Instead, pari-mutuel betting was legalized via referendum, with horse betting expected to make up the lost revenue.

In addition to the ongoing state and federal investigations into voter fraud, Moore damaged his reputation and popularity by appointing Hague's son to the Court of Errors and Appeals, the state's highest court, in 1939.

World War II began in the second half of Moore's term and was the focus of his final years in office. He established the Governor's Emergency Committee, the first state civil defense agency in the nation, by executive order. He also oversaw the development and training of the national guard and, in his final months, the administration of the nation's first peacetime draft.

In January 1941, Moore left office for the final time, to be succeeded by Secretary of the Navy Charles Edison.

== Later life and death ==
After retiring as governor, Moore resumed his legal practice in Jersey City.

Hague attempted to recruit Moore to run for governor in 1943, but Moore adamantly refused. Hague instead ran mayor Vincent J. Murphy of Newark, who was defeated by Walter Evans Edge. The election briefly led to a split between Moore and Hague, but they had reconciled by 1944, and Moore was selected as a delegate to the 1944 Democratic National Convention.

In 1945, Governor Edge appointed Moore to a vacancy on the State Board of Education.

In his final years, Moore maintained a residence in his old Lafayette neighborhood but spent most of his time at a summer home in Mount Airy, where he enjoyed horseback riding. He remained busy with law, service on corporate boards, and speaking engagements.

His final major political involvement was as campaign manager for Elmer H. Wene, the Democratic nominee for Governor in 1949. In the same year, the Hague machine in Jersey City finally collapsed.

=== Death and legacy ===
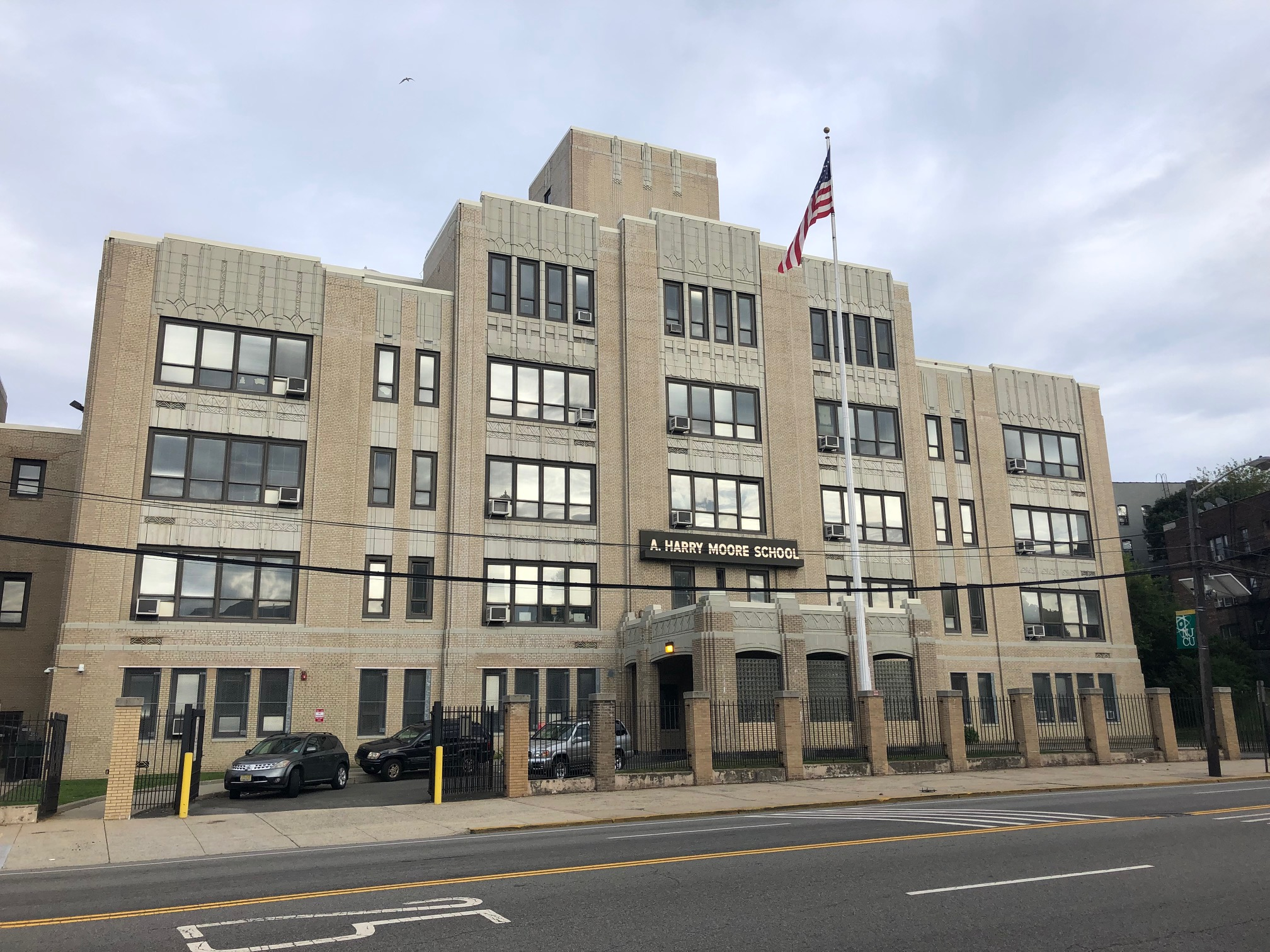
A. Harry Moore School built in 1931 is part of New Jersey City University

Moore died on November 18, 1952, at the age of 75, in Branchburg Township, New Jersey, when he suffered a stroke while driving with his wife and ran his car off the highway. His wife Jennie was only slightly injured in the crash. He was buried at Bayview – New York Bay Cemetery in Jersey City.

A.Harry Moore School still serves the children of Jersey City and Hudson County. Since 1963, the school is part of New Jersey City University (NJCU) and is a laboratory school for its Special Education program

== Personal life ==
Moore married Jennie Hastings Stevens, a neighbor, on March 28, 1911. They had no children. Moore taught the men's bible class at Lafayette Reformed Church, while Jennie taught Sunday school.

== See also ==
- List of governors of New Jersey

== Notes ==
Political offices
Preceded by George Sebastian Silzer	Governor of New Jersey; January 19, 1926 – January 15, 1929	Succeeded by Morgan Foster Larson
Preceded by Morgan Foster Larson	Governor of New Jersey; January 19, 1932 – January 3, 1935	Succeeded by Harold G. Hoffman
Preceded by Harold G. Hoffman	Governor of New Jersey; January 18, 1938 – January 21, 1941	Succeeded by Charles Edison
U.S. Senate
Preceded by Hamilton Fish Kean	U.S. Senator (Class 1) from New Jersey; January 3, 1935 – January 17, 1938	Succeeded by John G. Milton
Party political offices
Preceded by George Sebastian Silzer	Democratic Nominee for Governor of New Jersey; 1925	Succeeded by William L. Dill
Preceded by William L. Dill	Democratic Nominee for Governor of New Jersey; 1931	Succeeded by William L. Dill
Preceded by Edward I. Edwards	Democratic Nominee for the U.S. Senate (Class 1) from New Jersey; 1934	Succeeded by William H. J. Ely
Preceded by William L. Dill	Democratic Nominee for Governor of New Jersey; 1937	Succeeded by Charles Edison
