= David Baird Jr. =

American politician

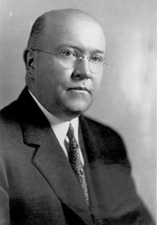

United States Senator from New Jersey
- In office November 30, 1929 – December 2, 1930
- Appointed by: Morgan Foster Larson
- Preceded by: Walter Evans Edge
- Succeeded by: Dwight Morrow

Personal details
- Born: David Baird Jr. October 10, 1881 Camden, New Jersey, U.S.
- Died: February 28, 1955 (aged 73) Camden, New Jersey
- Party: Republican
- Parent: David Baird Sr.

David Baird Jr. (October 10, 1881 – February 28, 1955) was a U.S. senator from New Jersey.

== Biography ==
Born in Camden, New Jersey to Senator David Baird, Baird Jr. graduated from Lawrenceville School in 1899 and from Princeton University in 1903. Like his father, he engaged in the lumber business and banking in Camden from 1903 to 1929.

On November 30, 1929, Baird was appointed as a Republican to the United States Senate to fill the vacancy caused by the resignation of Walter Evans Edge. He served from November 30, 1929, to December 2, 1930, when a duly elected successor was qualified. Baird was not a candidate for election to the vacancy in 1930.

Baird was an unsuccessful candidate for Governor of New Jersey in 1931, after which he resumed former business pursuits.

He was appointed by the Governor to the Delaware River Joint Toll Bridge Commission to fill an unexpired term in 1938. He then worked as insurance broker, and died in Camden in 1955, aged 73. He was interred in Harleigh Cemetery.

U.S. Senate
Preceded by Walter Evans Edge	U.S. Senator (Class 2) from New Jersey; 1929–1930	Succeeded by Dwight Morrow
Party political offices
Preceded by Morgan Foster Larson	Republican Nominee for Governor of New Jersey; 1931	Succeeded by Harold G. Hoffman
