= Harold G. Hoffman =

American politician (1896–1954)

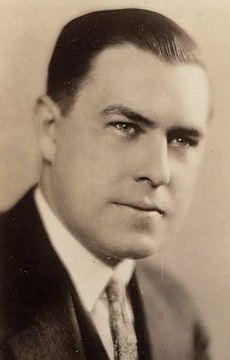
- Hoffman c. 1934

41st Governor of New Jersey
- In office January 15, 1935 – January 18, 1938
- Preceded by: Horace Griggs Prall (acting)
- Succeeded by: A. Harry Moore

Member of the U.S. House of Representatives from New Jersey's 3rd district
- In office March 4, 1927 – March 3, 1931
- Preceded by: Stewart H. Appleby
- Succeeded by: William H. Sutphin

Personal details
- Born: Harold Giles Hoffman; February 7, 1896 South Amboy, New Jersey, U.S.
- Died: June 4, 1954 (aged 58) New York City, U.S.
- Party: Republican
- Spouse: Lillie Moss (m. 1919)

Harold Giles Hoffman (February 7, 1896 – June 4, 1954) was an American businessman, media personality, and politician who served as the 41st Governor of New Jersey from 1935 to 1938. His time in office was marked by controversy over his support for a sales tax and interference in the Lindbergh kidnapping case. He died while subject to an investigation for embezzlement from his bank and the state government, which he confessed to his daughter before his death.

Hoffman also served two terms representing Middlesex, Monmouth, and Ocean counties (as New Jersey's 3rd congressional district) in the United States House of Representatives from 1927 to 1931, represented Middlesex in the New Jersey General Assembly, and served as mayor of South Amboy.

== Early life and education ==
Harold Giles Hoffman was born on February 7, 1896, in South Amboy, New Jersey, to Frank Hoffman and Ada Crawford Thom. His mother was the daughter of the painter James Crawford Thom and the granddaughter of Scottish sculptor James Thom. His father's ancestors included the earliest European settlers in New Amsterdam from Sweden and Dutch nobility.

Hoffman attended public schools and worked as a local newspaper reporter while still in high school. Upon graduating from South Amboy High School in 1913, he joined the Perth Amboy Evening News as a full-time employee, becoming assistant city editor and sports editor. He left the newspaper after a dispute with the owner and worked at the Du Pont Laboratory in Parlin.

=== World War I ===
Hoffman enlisted in the Third Infantry of the New Jersey National Guard on July 25, 1917, 3 months after the United States declaration of war on Germany. The division soon became the 114th Infantry of the 29th Division of the American Expeditionary Forces.

He saw action in the Meuse-Argonne offensive and was promoted to captain on the battlefield before returning home. He was eventually discharged in 1946 with the rank of lieutenant colonel.

=== Banking career ===
After World War I, Hoffman returned to South Amboy and became an executive with the South Amboy Trust Company. Over the next decades, he built a career as a prominent South Amboy businessman, serving as vice president of the Trust Company, president of a real estate corporation, president of a mortgage company, treasurer of another realty and investment corporation, and director of a building and loan association. He became well known throughout the state banking community.

== Early political career ==
Hoffman was engaged in South Amboy and Middlesex County Republican Party politics from an early age. He was appointed treasurer of South Amboy and entered elected office as an Assemblyman in 1923.

In 1925, Hoffman won a write-in campaign for mayor and served as secretary to Senate President Morgan Foster Larson.

In 1926, Hoffman was elected to the United States House of Representatives from the 3rd congressional district (which consisted of Middlesex, Monmouth, and Ocean counties) by a wide margin over Fred De Voe, despite the district's usual Democratic lean. He won re-election over John R. Phillips Jr. in 1928. Though his career in Washington was undistinguished, his electoral success also earned him the chair of the Middlesex County Republican Party and a prominent role in the state party hierarchy.

When Morgan Larson was elected Governor of New Jersey in 1928, he appointed Hoffman to a four-year term as the state Commissioner of Motor Vehicles. Hoffman continued to hold his seat in Congress until it expired in 1931 and used the position to its full advantage as a platform to raise his public image and build a national reputation as a spokesman for highway safety, a relatively new issue at the time. After his term as commissioner expired in 1933, Hoffman worked to build a loyal statewide political organization by campaigning on behalf of other candidates throughout the state.

== Governor of New Jersey ==
=== 1934 election ===
In 1934, Hoffman initially considered challenging incumbent U.S. Senator Hamilton Fish Kean before being persuaded to seek the Republican nomination for Governor. Hoffman won the primary with a majority of the vote over State Senators Emerson L. Richards and Joseph G. Wolber and judge Robert Carey.

In the general election, Hoffman faced his predecessor as commissioner of motor vehicles, William L. Dill. Dill was a political client of Jersey City boss Frank Hague. The campaign was low-key, with Hoffman avoiding strong stance on the issues and each candidate accusing the other of bossism. Hoffman won in an upset, becoming the first Republican elected Governor of New Jersey outside of a presidential election year since 1907. After his election, some accused Hague of selling out Dill to get Hoffman elected and branded Hoffman a "Hague Republican," but Hoffman's personal popularity nevertheless made him a potential contender for national office.

=== Term in office (1935–1938) ===
Hoffman's tenure in office was marked by controversy and notoriety.

As governor, Hoffman got into at least two separate fistfights with reporters.

He entered office in the midst of the Great Depression and the transfer of authority from states and municipalities to the federal government via New Deal relief programs, but most responsibility still fell to state government to address the crisis.

Among his first acts in office was to call for a state sales tax, an unpopular issue he had avoided addressing during the campaign. The proposal for any new tax was opposed by most Republicans, businesses, and taxpayers' associations; Hoffman instead turned to Frank Hague and urban Democrats to pass the legislation, and only six months into his term, the "unholy deal" dramatically undermined Hoffman's popularity in his own party and brought the enmity of Essex Republican Arthur T. Vanderbilt. In the 1935 Republican primaries, Vanderbilt's "Clean Government Group" made serious inroads, and Hoffman was forced to sign a sales tax repeal in October; he dramatically chose to sign the bill in red ink, symbolizing in his words, an "unbalanced budget and maybe hungry people."

==== Involvement in Hauptmann case ====
Hoffman drew further controversy on October 16, 1935, when he made a dramatic visit to the death row cell of Bruno Hauptmann, awaiting execution for the kidnapping and murder of Charles Lindbergh Jr. Hoffman believed Hauptmann had not acted alone, and claimed to hope to convince the convict to reveal his conspirators. He urged the other members of the New Jersey Court of Errors and Appeals, the state's highest court, to visit Hauptmann.

Just before Hauptmann's scheduled execution in January 1936, Hoffman granted him a thirty-day reprieve (while declaring he held no position on Hauptmann's guilt) and ordered the state police to reopen the investigation. During that time, Hoffman gained further disrepute when detective Ellis H. Parker conducted an independent investigation in which Parker kidnapped and coerced Paul Wendel, a Trenton attorney, into confessing to aiding Hauptmann.

Hoffman attempted to grant a second reprieve, but it was blocked. Hoffman said he would not grant another reprieve and Hauptmann was executed on April 3, 1936.

==== 1936 presidential campaign and 1937 election ====
Despite his declining popularity, Hoffman still harbored ambitions for the presidency, and his associates sought to first make him the undisputed favorite of the New Jersey delegation. However, strong sympathy for Alf Landon in the state and the continued opposition from Vanderbilt's Clean Government Group nixed his chances.

Though Hoffman was elected as a delegate to the 1936 Republican National Convention, he barely defeated a vigorous campaign from former U.S. Representative Franklin William Fort for the spot, and the other three delegates were critics of the governor. The political blow left him an effective lame duck for the remainder of his term, and he focused on setting himself up to run for governor again in 1940.

In the 1937 election, Hoffman's preferred candidate for Governor Clifford R. Powell lost the Republican nomination to Lester H. Clee, a Clean Government luminary who made his opposition to Hoffman central to the campaign. Clee narrowly lost the general election.

=== 1940 election ===
In 1940, having maneuvered himself an appointment as executive director of the state Unemployment Compensation Commission, Hoffman attempted to return to office as governor. This time, he had the strong and open support of Frank Hague, and he lost the Republican primary to Robert C. Hendrickson, another Clean Government candidate. Hoffman refused to support the nominee, and Hendrickson lost the election to Charles Edison.

== Later career ==
In 1939, Hoffman was named president of the minor league baseball Interstate League.

During World War II, Hoffman took military leave from the Unemployment Compensation Commission. He reentered the army as a major in the Transportation Corps on June 15, 1942, and served until June 24, 1946, when he was discharged with the rank of colonel. Upon discharge, Hoffman resumed his position as director of the Unemployment Commission.

During the Alfred Driscoll administration, Hoffman resigned to become the first director of the state Division of Employment Security within the Department of Labor and Industry.

In this period, Hoffman made several appearances on radio and television panel shows:

- In 1948, he appeared on the short-lived ABC network program That Reminds Me.
- On June 12, 1948, he was a guest panelist on the joke-themed radio program Stop Me If You've Heard This One.
- On February 2, 1950, Hoffman was one of four panelists on the debut presentation of the game show What's My Line?
- On February 16, 1950, he made a return appearance on What's My Line?
- In 1953, Hoffman appeared as a panelist on the NBC radio joke-telling program Can You Top This?

== Personal life ==
In 1919, Hoffman married Lillie May Moss, the daughter of a prominent South Amboy dentist.

== Embezzlement investigation and death ==
On March 18, 1954, newly inaugurated Governor Robert B. Meyner suddenly suspended Hoffman from his role at the Division of Employment and charged him with irregular purchases. For weeks, the charges remained unsubstantiated, and Hoffman's political allies accused Meyner of a political witch hunt. On June 4, Hoffman died in a New York City hotel room of a heart attack, intensifying the attacks on Meyner.

Several weeks later, the government released a thorough case against Hoffman, substantiated by a letter to his daughter shortly before his death revealing a long trail of corruption which lasted throughout his career. In the letter, Hoffman admitted to embezzling over $300,000 from the South Amboy Trust Company to pay off early campaign debts after a "certain wealthy elder candidate, who is now deceased" reneged on a promise to cover the debts. Then, from at least 1949 onwards, Hoffman admitted he had used state funds to cover the South Amboy Trust Company's shortages. In addition to these confessions, other charges arose against the former governor and his associates, including the revelation that another state official had blackmailed Hoffman for $150,000 to keep the embezzlement hidden. In the letter to his daughter, Hoffman wrote, "Morality, in its ultimate determination, is a funny thing."

Hoffman is buried in Christ Church Cemetery in South Amboy, New Jersey.

== See also ==
- Adventurers' Club of New York
- List of governors of New Jersey

U.S. House of Representatives
Preceded by Stewart H. Appleby	Member of the U.S. House of Representatives from New Jersey's 3rd congressional district March 4, 1927 – March 3, 1931	Succeeded by William H. Sutphin
Political offices
Preceded by A. Harry Moore	Governor of New Jersey; January 15, 1935 – January 18, 1938	Succeeded by A. Harry Moore
Party political offices
Preceded by David Baird, Jr.	Republican Nominee for Governor of New Jersey; 1934	Succeeded by Lester H. Clee
