= 1907 United States gubernatorial elections =

- November 5, 1907; September 17, 1907 (OK); April 21, 1908 (LA)

8 governorships
	Majority party	Minority party
Party	Republican	Democratic
Seats before	25	19
Seats after	26	19
Seat change	▲1	Steady
Seats up	2	5
Seats won	3	5
	Third party
Party	Silver
Seats before	1
Seats after	1
Seat change	Steady
Seats up	0
Seats won	0
- Democratic gain Democratic hold Republican gain Republican hold

United States gubernatorial elections were held in 1907, in eight states.

Kentucky, Louisiana, Maryland and Mississippi held their gubernatorial elections in odd numbered years, every four years, preceding the United States presidential election year. New Jersey at this time held gubernatorial elections every three years. It would abandon this practice in 1949. Massachusetts and Rhode Island both elected their governors to a single-year term. This was the last time Rhode Island elected its governors to a single-year term, as it switched to two-year-terms from the 1912 election.

Oklahoma held its first gubernatorial election on achieving statehood.

== Results ==
State	Incumbent	Party	Status	Opposing candidates
Kentucky	J. C. W. Beckham	Democratic	Term-limited, Republican victory	Augustus E. Willson (Republican) 51.17% S. W. Hager (Democratic) 46.87% L. L. Pickett (Prohibition) 1.52% Claude Andrews (Socialist) 0.36% James H. Arnold (Socialist Labor) 0.09%
Louisiana (held, April 21, 1908)	Newton C. Blanchard	Democratic	Term-limited, Democratic victory	Jared Y. Sanders (Democratic) 87.14% Henry N. Pharr (Republican) 11.05% James Barnes (Socialist) 1.81% Democratic primary results Jared Y. Sanders 56.29% Theodore S. Wilkinson 43.71%
Maryland	Edwin Warfield	Democratic	Retired, Democratic victory	Austin Lane Crothers (Democratic) 50.66% George R. Gaither Jr. (Republican) 46.81% James W. Frizzell (Prohibition) 1.88% Ira Culp (Socialist) 0.65%
Massachusetts	Curtis Guild Jr.	Republican	Re-elected, 50.33%	Henry M. Whitney (Democratic) 22.58% Thomas L. Hisgen (Independence League) 20.20% Charles W. Bartlett (Anti-Merger) 3.00% John W. Brown (Socialist) 2.04% Hervey S. Cowell (Prohibition) 1.02% Thomas F. Brennan (Socialist Labor) 0.80%
Mississippi	James K. Vardaman	Democratic	Term-limited, Democratic victory	Edmund F. Noel (Democratic) 100.00% Democratic primary run-off results Edmund F. Noel 50.87% Earl Leroy Brewer 49.13% (majority, 2,002)
New Jersey	Edward C. Stokes	Republican	Term-limited, Republican victory	John Franklin Fort (Republican) 49.28% Frank S. Katzenbach Jr. (Democratic) 47.25% Frederick Krafft (Socialist) 1.74% James G. Mason (Prohibition) 1.33% John C. Butterworth (Socialist Labor) 0.40%
Oklahoma (held, September 17, 1907)	New state			Charles N. Haskell (Democratic) 53.42% Frank Frantz (Republican) 42.81% C. C. Ross (Socialist) 3.78%
Rhode Island	James H. Higgins	Democratic	Re-elected, 50.37%	Frederick H. Jackson (Republican) 46.90% Louis E. Remington (Prohibition) 1.26% William H. Johnston (Socialist) 1.03% John W. Leach (Socialist Labor) 0.44%
