= 1910 New Jersey gubernatorial election =

- November 8, 1910
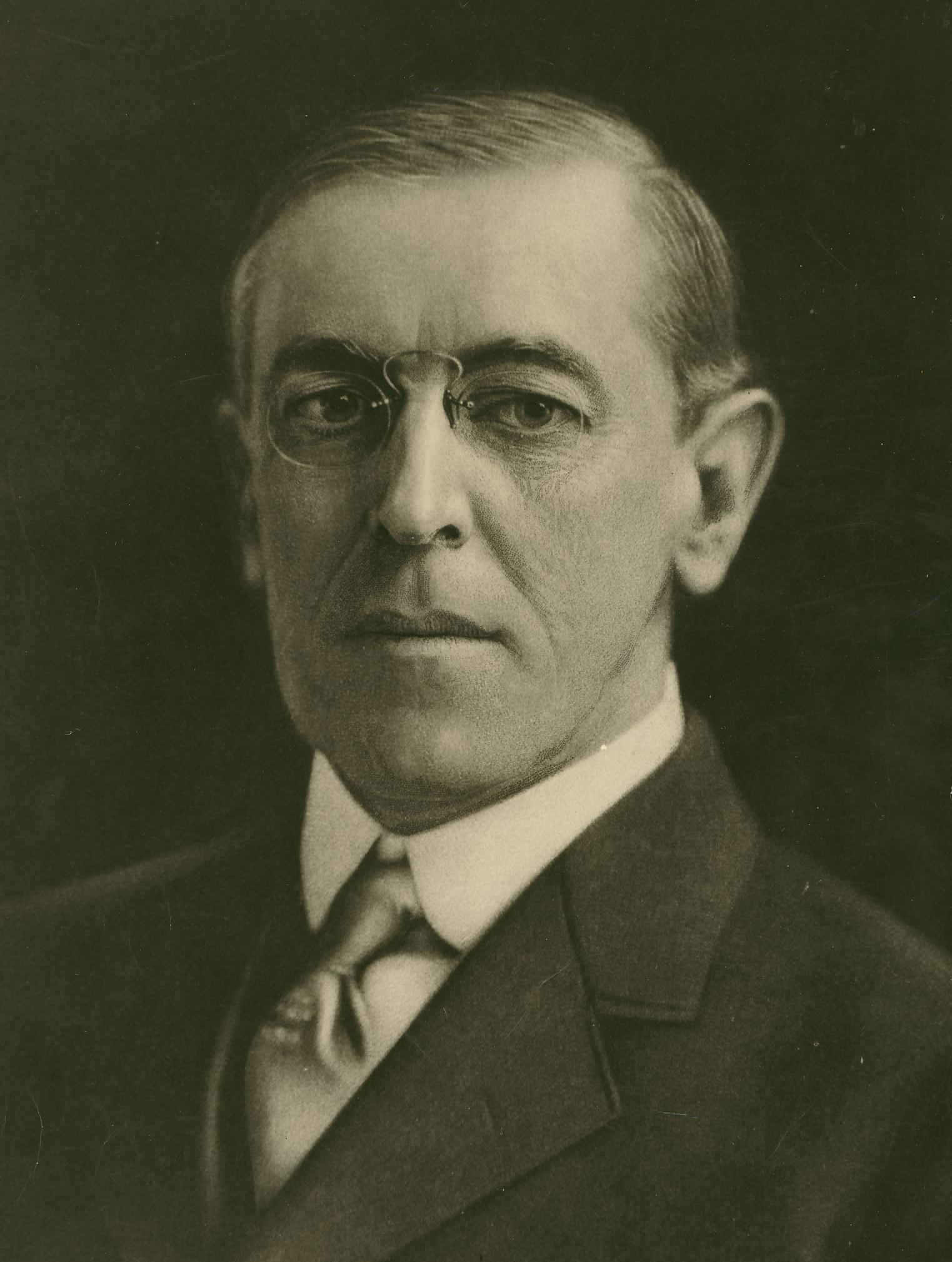

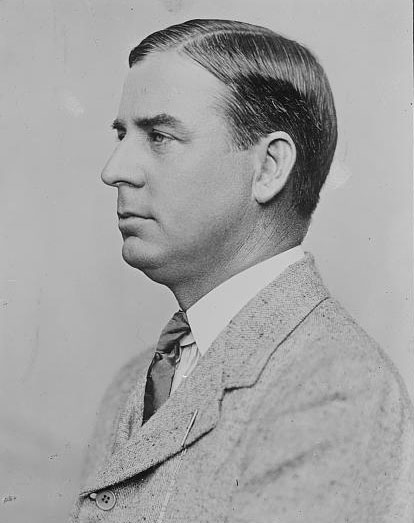
Nominee	Woodrow Wilson	Vivian M. Lewis
Party	Democratic	Republican
Popular vote	233,682	184,626
Percentage	53.93%	42.61%
- County results Wilson: 40–50% 50–60% 60–70% Lewis: 40–50% 50–60% 60–70%
Governor before election
John Franklin Fort
Republican
Elected Governor
Woodrow Wilson
Democratic

The 1910 New Jersey gubernatorial election was held on November 8, 1910. Democratic nominee and future President Woodrow Wilson defeated Republican Assemblyman Vivian M. Lewis with 53.93% of the vote. During the campaign, Wilson underwent a political transformation from a symbol of conservative Wall Street reaction into one of the leading members of his party's progressive faction. His victory was widely understood to be the prelude to his campaign for the presidency in 1912.

Wilson was the first Democrat elected Governor of New Jersey since 1892 and the first Democrat to carry Bergen, Burlington, Gloucester, Somerset, Morris, Ocean, or Union counties in that time. This was the last time Somerset County voted more Democratic than the state as a whole in a New Jersey governor election until 2021.

== Background ==
Since 1895 and the realignment of Northeastern politics under President William McKinley, New Jersey had been controlled by the Republican Party, which had won five consecutive gubernatorial elections after losing the previous ten. The New Jersey Senate, apportioned on a per-county basis, was controlled by the Republican Party, and both of the state's United States Senators, John Kean and Frank O. Briggs, were Republicans. Republican presidential candidates had carried the state handily in every election since 1896.

In 1910, however, Democratic hopes were high given the declining popularity of the William Howard Taft administration and a growing rift in the Republican ranks between the conservative Taft and his progressive predecessor, Theodore Roosevelt. Seeking to break the Republican hold on the governor's office and elect a Democratic U.S. Senator in 1911, party leaders sought a progressive candidate who could divide the state's large Republican vote.

=== Woodrow Wilson ===
Princeton University president Woodrow Wilson had long been recruited for a career in politics, widely known for progressive, sometimes controversial, reforms he had instilled at Princeton but also considered a conservative Southerner by intuition. As early as 1906, George Brinton McClellan Harvey had publicly spoken of Wilson as a potential President of the United States; Wilson entertained the idea by dining with Harvey soon after.

In 1907, Harvey and former Senator James Smith Jr. backed Wilson for the United States Senate, though given Republican control of the legislature, the endorsement was purely honorary; Wilson withdrew his name in favor of Edwin Augustus Stevens Jr., his former Princeton classmate. Though he declined to seek office, Wilson did write a "Credo" that year for possible use by the New York Sun, which denounced labor unionism and the closed shop, embraced "the right of freedom of contract" as the "most precious of all the possession of a free people," and declared opposition to the regulation of trusts by government commissions. In a speech to the graduating class of 1909, Wilson declared that labor unions existed primarily to keep production standards as low as possible.

In early 1910, Harvey and Smith, who by then had become the boss of the Essex County machine, met at Delmonico's and settled on Wilson as their preferred candidate for governor. Both Harvey and Smith were leading eastern conservatives, representative of Wall Street and machine politics; they considered Wilson suitably conservative based on his public political statements critical of Bryanism and Theodore Roosevelt. Others viewed Wilson as a potential progressive based on his university reforms, where he had publicly opposed the influence of wealthy donors, particularly Moses Taylor Pyne, on education and research.

== Democratic nomination ==
=== Candidates ===
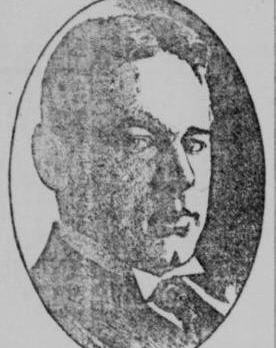
Frank S. Katzenbach, the popular former Trenton mayor and 1907 nominee, was Wilson's chief opponent for the nomination.

- William Harrigan, Essex County sheriff
- John Hinchliffe, former state senator from Passaic County and mayor of Paterson
- Frank S. Katzenbach, former mayor of Trenton and nominee for governor in 1907
- George Sebastian Silzer, state senator from Middlesex County
- Woodrow Wilson, president of Princeton University
- H. Otto Wittpenn, mayor of Jersey City

=== Campaign ===
After Wilson privately informed Harvey that, if the nomination were provided to him "on a silver platter," that he would have to give "serious consideration," Harvey and Smith began to actively work to secure his nomination. Wilson also began to position himself politically in anticipation of the general election campaign, attempting to shed his conservative reputation in order to attract progressive votes. However, Wilson sought to avoid association with radicals, and he privately reassured Smith that he would not challenge the existing state party machine, so long as the machine backed his policies and left him his choice of "measures and men."

Wilson spent most of the summer attending to his university duties, while Harvey and Smith looked past 1910 toward a potential presidential campaign, setting up meetings with men of influence in national politics, including Henry Watterson, Roger Charles Sullivan, and Edward N. Hurley. On July 12, Wilson also met with county political bosses to secure their support for his nomination. The bosses were satisfied with Wilson's acquiescence on machine power but disappointed in his support for a local option on liquor regulation. (Opposition to liquor restrictions had long been a cornerstone of the New Jersey Democratic platform.) He declined to modify his position. Three days later, Wilson publicly denied that he was a candidate for the nomination but announced his willingness to be drafted.

Having turned his attention to politics, Wilson expected the bosses to secure his nomination without contest. His chief obstacle in that regard was Frank S. Katzenbach, the mayor of Trenton and the 1907 nominee. Katzenbach had narrowly lost the election and remained popular with Democratic voters; a Trenton Times poll of Mercer County, where both candidates had long resided, returned an overwhelming majority for Katzenbach. When Katzenbach remained in the race through the summer, Wilson wrote to Harvey, "I do not understand this Katzenbach business at all."

In addition to ambivalence from party faithful, Wilson faced active hostility from the state's organized labor movement given his past hostility. Wilson was initially received poorly by progressive elements in the state, especially the Jersey City "New Idea" men led by George L. Record, Mark M. Fagan, and Joseph Patrick Tumulty.

The popular opposition surprised and disappointed Wilson, who considered it a reversal of fortune from the popular support and insider opposition he had experienced as university president. Nevertheless, he maintained a strategy of public silence, avoiding any direct comment on controversial issues and relying on the machine to deliver his nomination. As the convention approached, progressives planned to vote for the strongest anti-Wilson option.

=== Convention ===
The Democratic convention was held in Trenton on September 15.

Entering the convention, Wilson's nomination was far from assured, but a slight majority of delegates favored him over Katzenbach. As part of an effort to keep Wilson in the machine's good graces, Harvey allowed him to personally write the party platform, which was warmly embraced by progressives and ratified to start proceedings.

Katzenbach was nominated by John W. Wescott, setting off a popular demonstration for the candidate. Wilson's name was submitted by Smith, who admitted few delegates had "a passing acquaintance" with his candidate. Despite protests on the convention floor, balloting began and Wilson's nomination was carried through by boss control, as expected from the start. The first round of balloting showed Wilson with 42.5 more votes than required. Before an official count could be announced, the Middlesex County delegation switched their 62 votes from Senator Silzer to Wilson, followed by the remainder of the delegates to make the nomination unanimous.

1910 Democratic convention (before shifts)
Party	Candidate	Votes	%
Democratic	Woodrow Wilson	749.5	52.97%
Democratic	Frank S. Katzenbach	372	26.29%
Democratic	George Sebastian Silzer	210	14.84%
Democratic	H. Otto Wittpenn	76.5	5.41%
Democratic	William Harrigan	6	0.42%
Democratic	John Hinchliffe	1	0.07%
Total votes		1,415	100.00%

After learning of his nomination, Wilson made the twelve mile trip from Princeton, where he had been golfing, to accept the nomination, endorse the party platform, and address the convention. Wilson was introduced as "the next President of the United States" and his acceptance speech, which stressed his independence from the machine, won applause from the delegates. Joseph Patrick Tumulty, one of the progressive men who had opposed Wilson's nomination, was won over by the speech and later became Wilson's personal secretary.

He immediately announced his intention to resign from Princeton, and his resignation was made effective at the next board meeting on October 20.

== Republican nomination ==
=== Candidates ===
- Joseph S. Frelinghuysen, state senator from Somerset County and president of the New Jersey Senate
- Pierre Prosper Garven, mayor of Bayonne and Hudson County prosecutor
- Vivian M. Lewis, New Jersey Banking and Insurance Commissioner and former assemblyman from Paterson
- William P. Martin, member of the Essex County Progressive Republican League

=== Primary ===
Primary elections to elect delegates to the state convention were held on September 13.

=== Convention ===
The Republican Convention was held in Trenton on September 20. Vivian M. Lewis was nominated after balloting showed that he had 801 and three-eighths votes, with only 487 necessary to win. After this, Garven's supporters in Hudson County threw their support to Lewis and he was nominated unanimously.

1910 Republican convention (before shifts)
Party	Candidate	Votes	%
Republican	Vivian M. Lewis	801.375	75.89%
Republican	William P. Martin	115.625	10.95%
Republican	Pierre Prosper Garven	83	7.86%
Republican	Joseph S. Frelinghuysen	56	5.30%
Total votes		1,056	100.00%

The platform largely reflected Lewis's progressive views, including a call for a rate-making public utilities commission, an employment liability law, civil service regulations, regulation of automobiles, and improve election and primary laws.

== General election ==
=== Candidates ===
- John C. Butterworth (Socialist Labor)
- Wilson B. Killingbeck (Socialist)
- Vivian M. Lewis, State Banking and Insurance Commissioner and former assemblyman from Paterson (Republican)
- C. F. Repp (Prohibition)
- Woodrow Wilson, president of Princeton University (Democratic)

=== Campaign ===
Wilson's nomination and acceptance speech instantly brought national political scrutiny to the campaign, given the widespread understanding that it would be the prelude to a presidential campaign in 1912. Wilson, a political novice, hoped for a low-key, self-funded campaign which would be run on a part-time basis. He had a distaste for the barnstorming, back-slapping politics associated with Bryanism and initially proposed a campaign budget of $500; before its end, Smith alone would contribute over $50,000.

In September, Wilson delivered opening speeches in Jersey City and Plainfield, which waffled between his prior support for Jeffersonian limited government and his new progressive stances. The speeches met mixed reviews; Tumulty advised the candidate that his performance was "most disappointing." Wilson's fortunes improved dramatically after a September 30 address in Newark, in which he established his progressive credentials and addressed claims that he lacked specifics by calling for strict regulation of corporations and a commission to regulate public utilities.

The turning point in the campaign came in October, shortly after Wilson's resignation from Princeton was made formal. George L. Record, a well-known progressive columnist and Republican candidate for U.S. House, answered Wilson's open invitation to a public debate. Wilson counter-proposed a public correspondence; on October 19, Record submitted a long list of questions, testing Wilson's support for nearly every progressive cause. Wilson answered in favor of every policy position and publicly pledged that his party's bosses would not control state government if he won election. He nevertheless declined to demand that legislative candidates pledge themselves to the progressive cause, claiming such a demand would be "unbecoming" interference with the legislative election.

On the eve of the election, Wilson delivered a final speech calling for the "regeneration" of the Democratic Party:

"We have begun a fight that, it may be, will take many a generation to complete, the fight against special privilege, but you know that men are not put into this world to go the path of ease; they are put into this world to go the path of pain and struggle. ... [A]nd some day, when we are all dead, men will come and point at the distant upland with a great shout of joy and triumph and thank God that there were men who undertook to lead in the struggle. What difference does it make if we ourselves do not reach the uplands? We have given our lives to the enterprise."

=== Results ===
On Election Day, Wilson won the state in a historic sweep, especially in the state's political context. Democrats took overwhelming control of the State Assembly.

1910 New Jersey gubernatorial election
Party	Candidate	Votes	%	±%
Democratic	Woodrow Wilson	233,682	53.93%	▲6.68
Republican	Vivian M. Lewis	184,626	42.61%	▼6.67
Socialist	Wilson B. Killingbeck	10,134	2.34%	▲0.60
Prohibition	C. F. Repp	2,818	0.65%	▼0.68
Socialist Labor	John C. Butterworth	2,032	0.47%	▲0.07
Total votes		433,292	100.00%	
Democratic gain from Republican		Swing	▲6.68	
