= Electoral history of Woodrow Wilson =

List of elections featuring Woodrow Wilson as a candidate

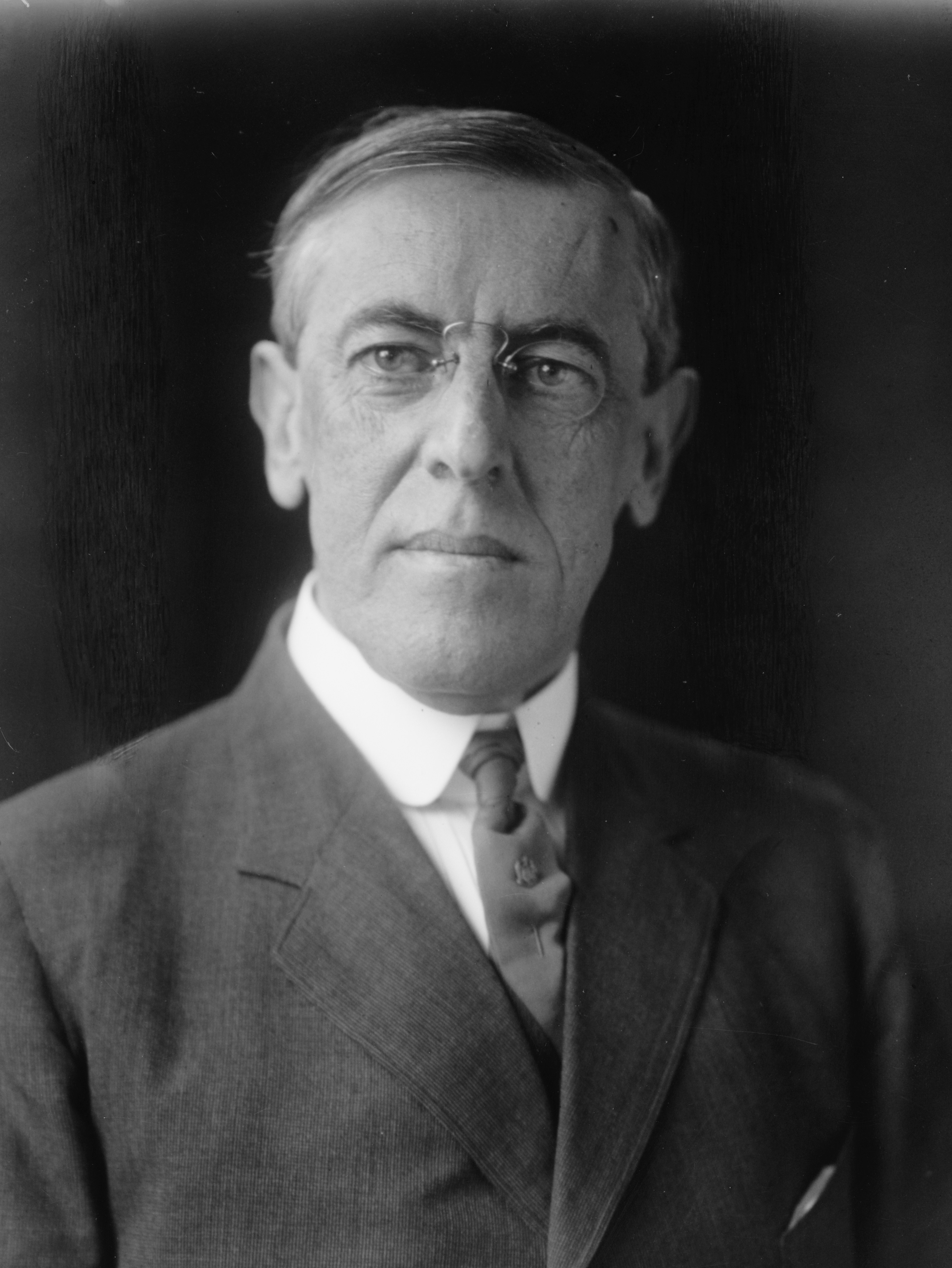
Portrait of Wilson by Harris & Ewing

This is the electoral history of Thomas Woodrow Wilson, a Democrat, who served as the 28th President of the United States (1913–1921), and earlier as the 34th Governor of New Jersey (1911–1913).

Wilson's electoral record is fairly short compared with most other American Presidents. Throughout his lifetime Wilson competed in only three public elections, winning all of them.

== 1910 New Jersey gubernatorial race ==
Results of the 1910 gubernatorial election in New Jersey. Wilson won the counties in blue.

=== Candidates ===
Major party candidates

- Woodrow Wilson, Democratic
- Vivian M. Lewis, Republican

Other candidates

- Wilson B. Killingbeck, Socialist
- C. F. Repp, Prohibition Party
- John C. Butterworth, Socialist Labor Party of America

=== Results ===
New Jersey gubernatorial election, 1910
Party	Candidate	Votes	%	±%
Democratic	Woodrow Wilson	233,682	53.93%	
Republican	Vivian M. Lewis	184,626	42.61%	
Socialist	Wilson B. Killingbeck	10,134	2.34%	
Prohibition	C. F. Repp	2,818	0.65%	
Socialist Labor	John C. Butterworth	2,032	0.47%	
Majority				
Turnout				
Democratic gain from Republican		Swing		

== 1912 Presidential Election ==
=== Democratic party nomination ===
1912 Democratic Party presidential primaries
- March 19 to June 4, 1912
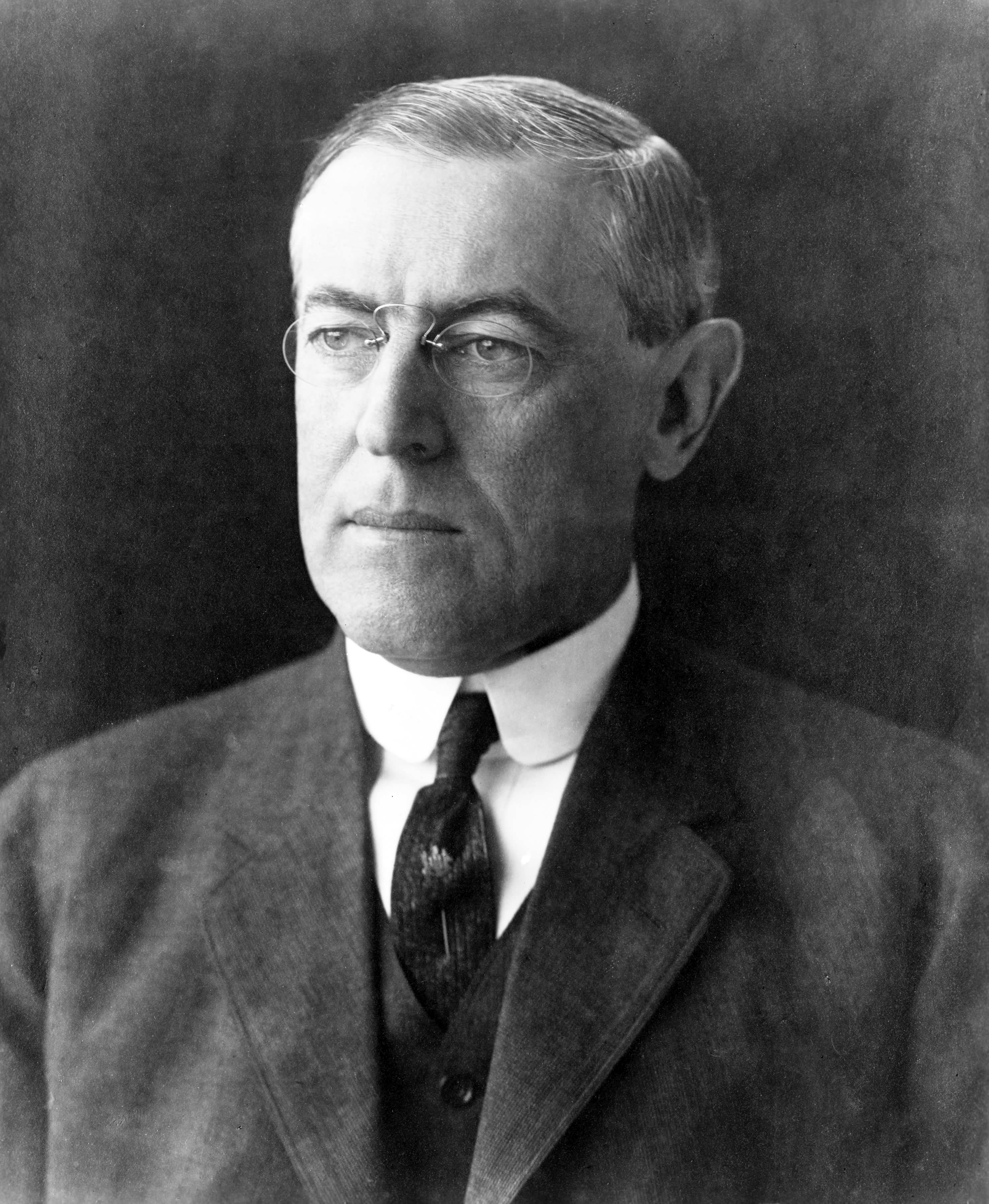

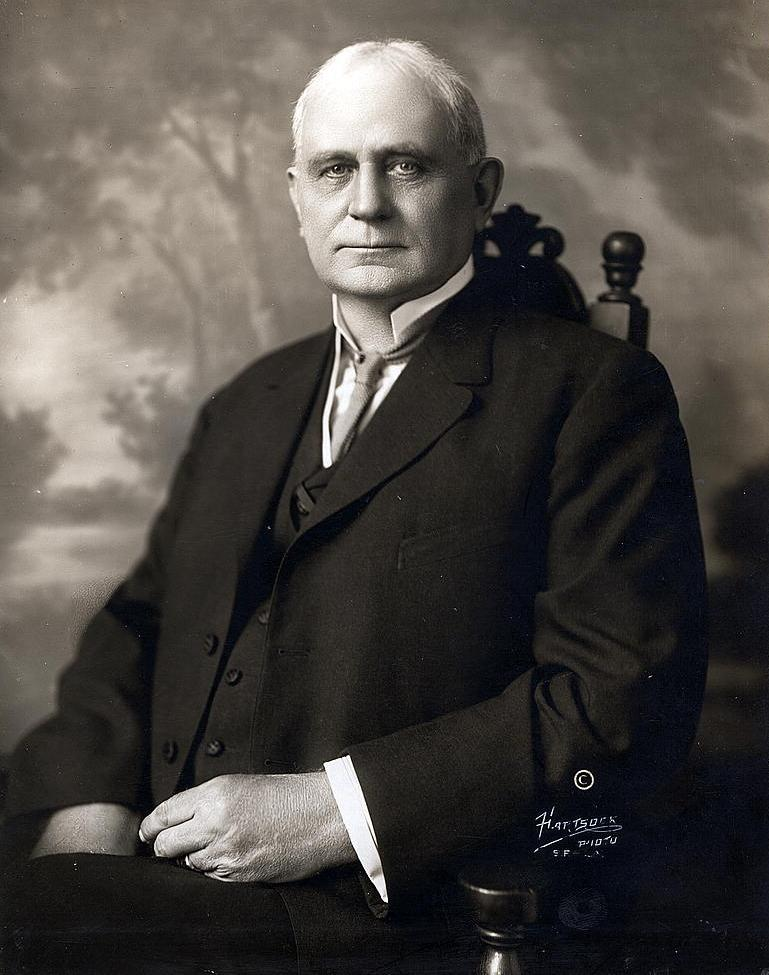

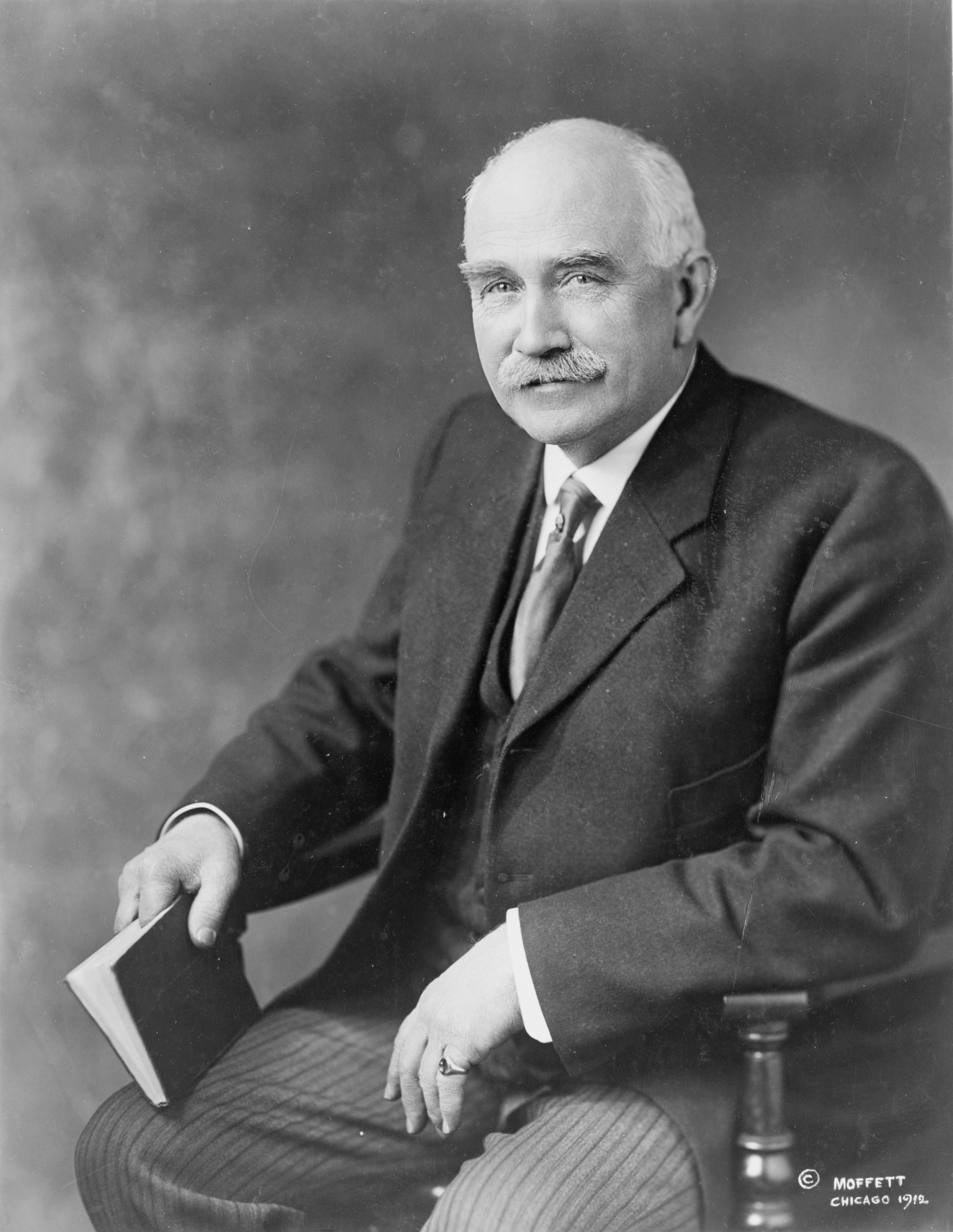

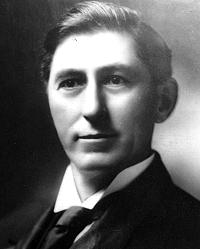
Candidate	Woodrow Wilson	Champ Clark
Home state	New Jersey	Missouri
Contests won	5	5
Popular vote	435,169	405,537
Percentage	44.6%	41.6%
Candidate	Judson Harmon	John Burke
Home state	Ohio	North Dakota
Contests won	1	1
Popular vote	116,294	9,357
Percentage	11.9%	1.0%
Previous Democratic nominee
William Jennings Bryan
Democratic nominee
Woodrow Wilson

==== 1912 Democratic Party presidential primaries ====
Wilson emerged the overall victor from the 12 Democratic Party caucuses and presidential primaries held in the lead up to the 1912 Democratic National Convention. The primary process was not what it is today however, most states did not hold primaries or caucuses and the party was not bound by the results in the way it is today.

==== The Democratic National Convention ====
The 1912 Democratic National Convention was one of the most protracted and contested in history. Wilson lost the first thirty ballots to House Speaker Champ Clark. Even though Clark secured a majority on the 9th Ballot, to be the party nominee, DNC rules at the time required at least two-thirds, so the voting continued. Wilson's chances steadily increased after he received the endorsement of William Jennings Bryant starting on the 10th Ballot. After initially trailing and almost giving up hope, Wilson finally prevailed on the 46th Ballot.

=== General Election ===
In the general election, Wilson faced two major opponents: incumbent Republican President William Howard Taft, and former Republican President Theodore Roosevelt, running on the "Bull Moose" Party ticket. Eugene V. Debs was the Socialist Party candidate and attracted far from token support. At the 1912 Republican National Convention Taft narrowly won re-nomination against Roosevelt, under whom he had served as Secretary of War. Roosevelt felt he had been cheated by party bosses and along with his supporters walked out of the convention. This split proved as expected, to be a major boost for Democrats in the general election. Wilson went on to become the first Democrat victor in a presidential election since 1892.

1912 United States presidential election
- November 5, 1912

531 members of the Electoral College 266 electoral votes needed to win
- Turnout: 58.8% ▼6.6 pp

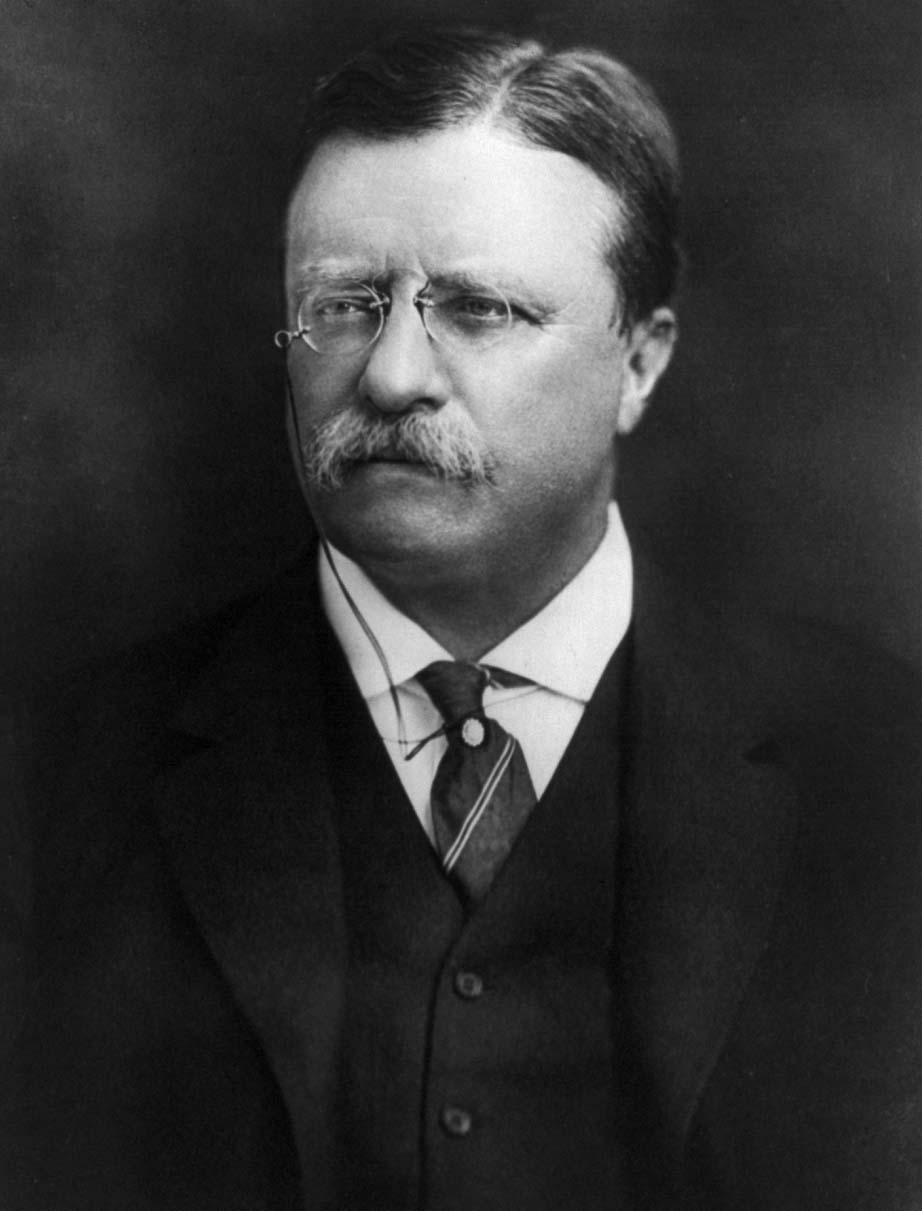

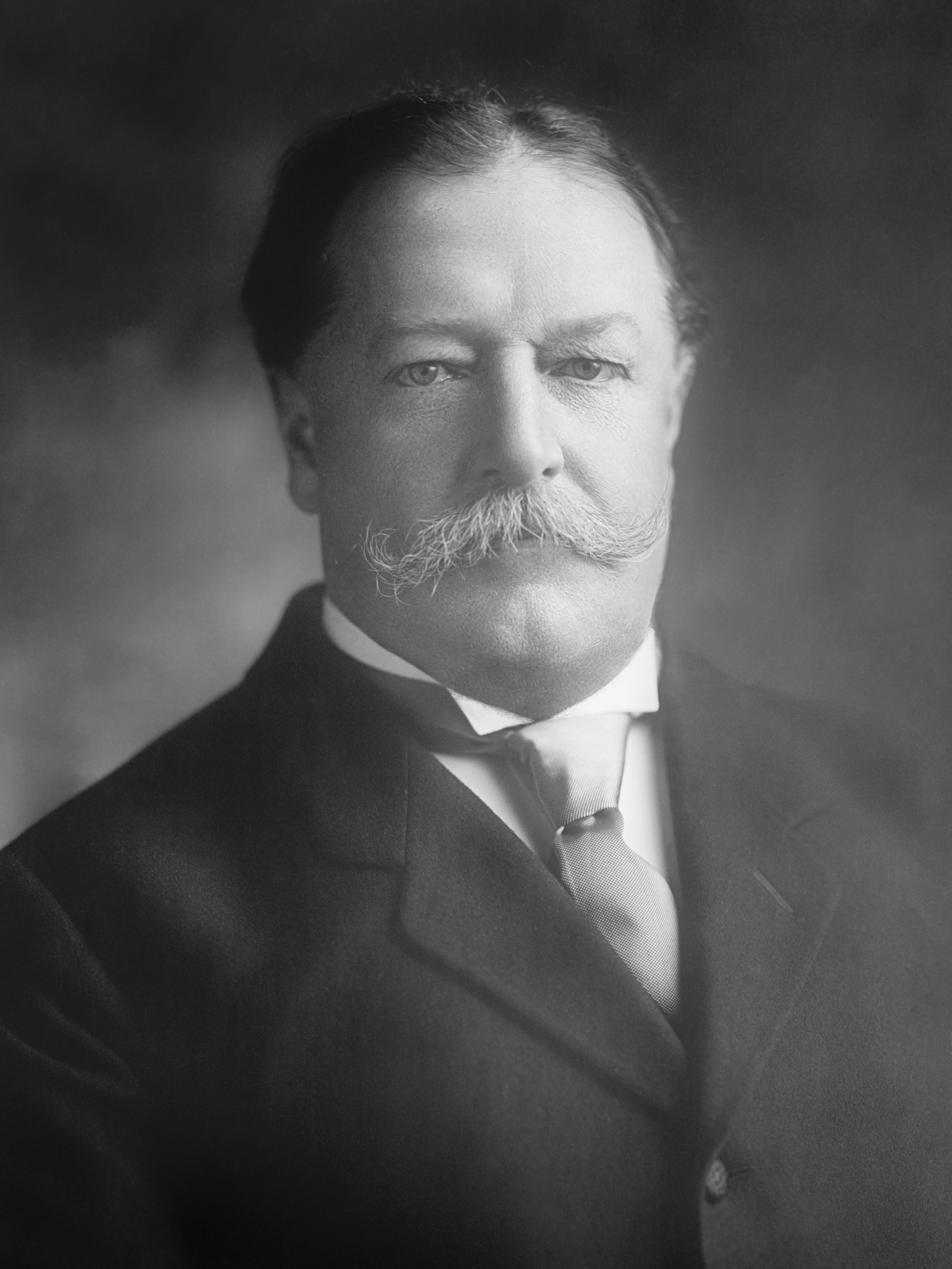

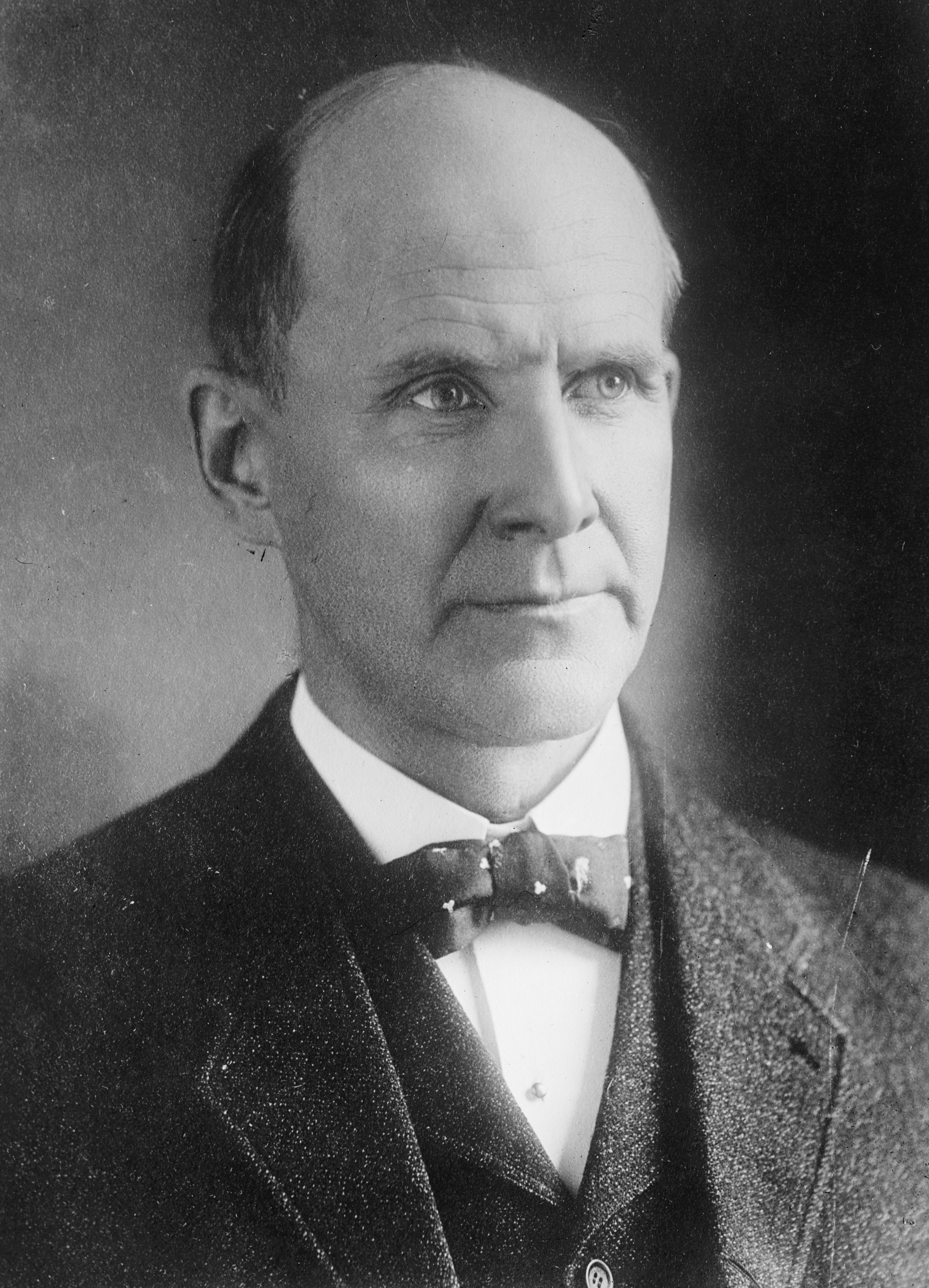
Nominee	Woodrow Wilson	Theodore Roosevelt
Party	Democratic	Progressive
Home state	New Jersey	New York
Running mate	Thomas R. Marshall	Hiram Johnson
Electoral vote	435	88
States carried	40	6
Popular vote	6,296,284	4,122,721
Percentage	41.8%	27.4%
Nominee	William Howard Taft	Eugene V. Debs
Party	Republican	Socialist
Home state	Ohio	Indiana
Running mate	Nicholas M. Butler (Note: Incumbent vice-president James S. Sherman was re-nominated to serve as Taft's running-mate, but died six days prior to the election. Butler was chosen to receive the Republican vice-presidential votes after the election.)	Emil Seidel
Electoral vote	8	0
States carried	2	0
Popular vote	3,486,242	918,332
Percentage	23.2%	6.0%
- Presidential election results map. Blue denotes those won by Wilson/Marshall, light green denotes those won by Roosevelt/Johnson, red denotes states won by Taft/Butler. Numbers indicate the number of electoral votes allotted to each state.
President before election
William Howard Taft
Republican
Elected President
Woodrow Wilson
Democratic

==== Results ====
On November 5, Wilson captured the presidency handily by carrying a record 40 states.

As of 2025, this is the only presidential election since 1860 in which 4 candidates received more than 5% of the popular vote and a third-party candidate outperformed a major party candidate in the general election. Wilson won the presidency with a lower percentage of the popular vote than any candidate since Abraham Lincoln in 1860. Taft's result remains the worst performance for any incumbent president, both in terms of electoral votes (8) and share of popular votes (23.17%). His 8 electoral votes remain the fewest by a Republican and by a losing major party candidate, matched by Alf Landon's 1936 campaign.

Despite his clear victory in electoral college votes, Wilson's popular vote total was less than that of William Jennings Bryan, in any of his three preceding presidential campaigns as the Democratic Party's nominee for president. In only two regions, New England and the Pacific, was Wilson's vote greater than the greatest Bryan vote. Wilson won a plurality, not a majority of the popular vote. Wilson's popular vote percentage was lowest of any victor in a U.S. Presidential Election since Abraham Lincoln in 1860.

== 1916 Presidential Election ==
1916 United States presidential election
- November 7, 1916

531 members of the Electoral College 266 electoral votes needed to win
- Turnout: 61.6% ▲2.8 pp
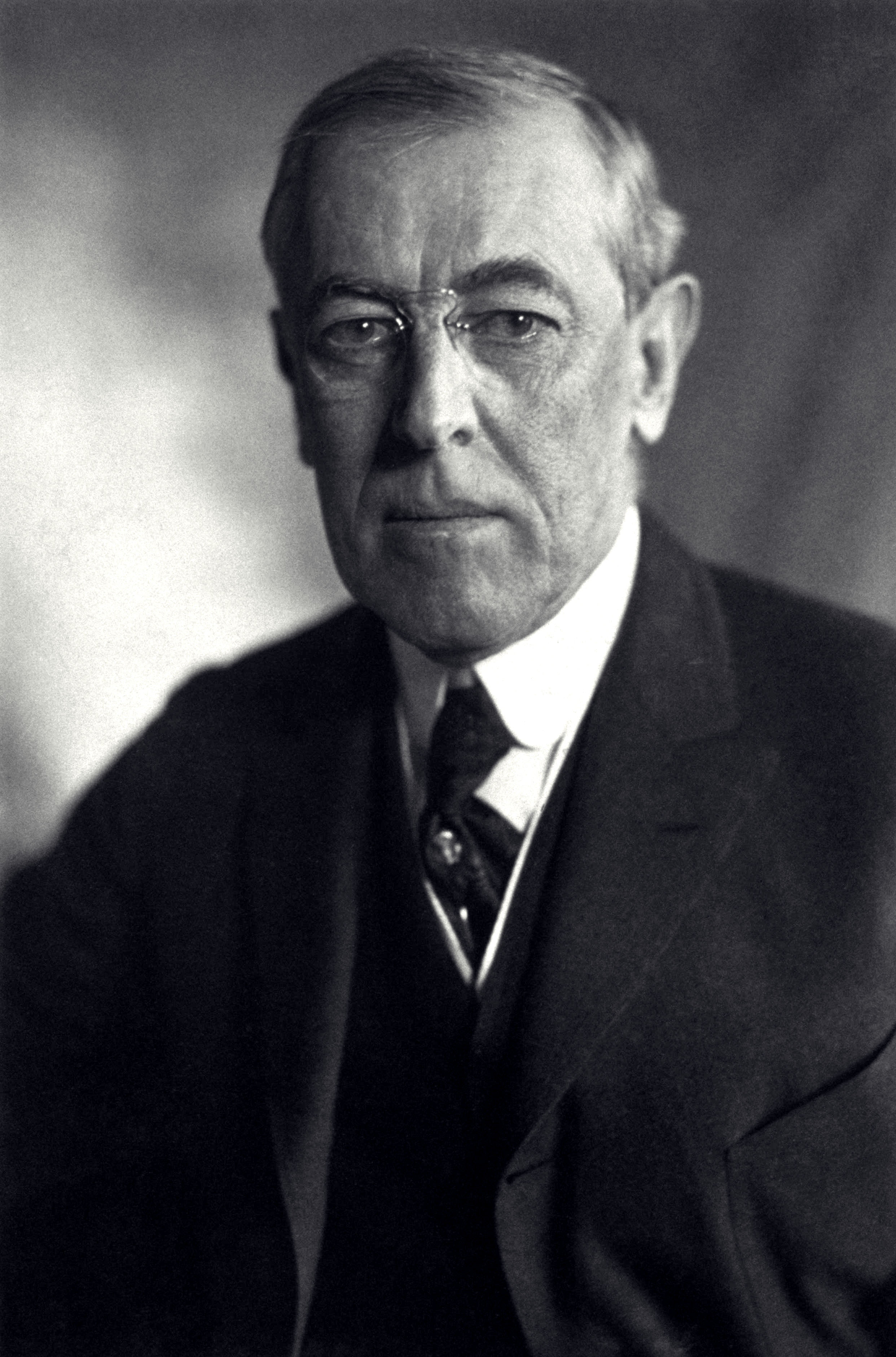

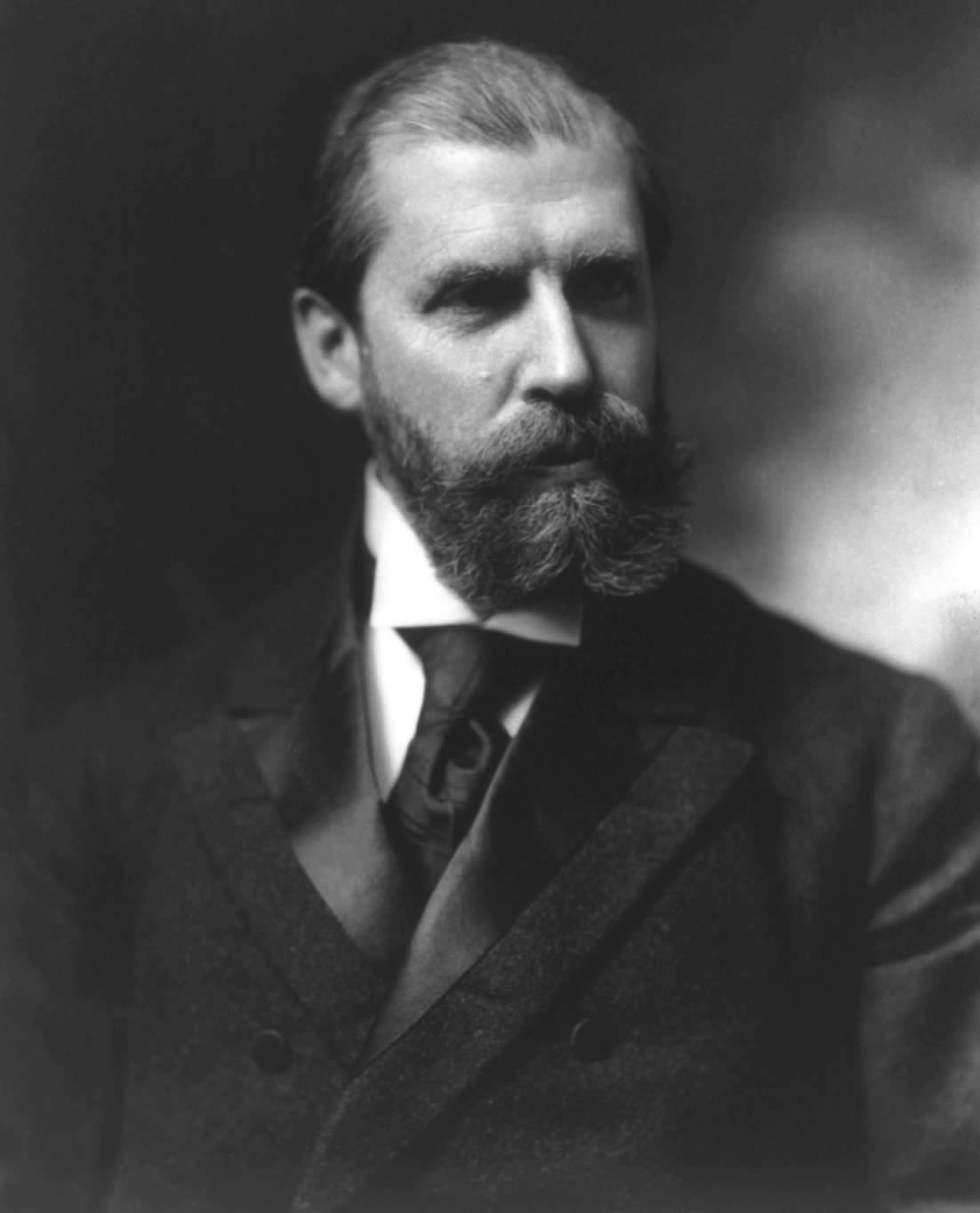
Nominee	Woodrow Wilson	Charles Evans Hughes
Party	Democratic	Republican
Home state	New Jersey	New York
Running mate	Thomas R. Marshall	Charles W. Fairbanks
Electoral vote	277	254
States carried	30	18
Popular vote	9,126,868	8,548,728
Percentage	49.2%	46.1%
- Presidential election results map. Blue denotes those won by Wilson/Marshall, red denotes states won by Hughes/Fairbanks. Numbers indicate the number of electoral votes allotted to each state.
President before election
Woodrow Wilson
Democratic
Elected President
Woodrow Wilson
Democratic

In 1916, Wilson ran for re-election. After easily securing re-nomination at the Democratic Convention, Wilson went on to narrowly win the general election against Republican Charles Hughes.
