= William A. Stevens =

American jurist and politician (1879–1941)

29th Attorney General of New Jersey
- In office 1929–1935
- Governor: Morgan F. Larson
- Preceded by: Edward L. Katzenbach
- Succeeded by: David T. Wilentz

President of the New Jersey Senate
- In office 1928–1929
- Preceded by: Francis B. Davis
- Succeeded by: Thomas A. Mathis

Member of the New Jersey Senate from Monmouth County
- In office 1919–1929
- Preceded by: Henry E. Ackerson Jr.
- Succeeded by: E. Donald Sterner

Personal details
- Born: July 19, 1879 Stapleton Heights, Staten Island, New York City
- Died: March 9, 1941 (aged 61) Philadelphia, Pennsylvania
- Education: State Normal School; New York Law School (L.L.B.)

William Asher Stevens (July 19, 1879 – March 9, 1941) was an American jurist and Republican Party politician who served as President of the New Jersey Senate and New Jersey Attorney General. As Attorney General he conducted the early phase of the state's investigation into the Lindbergh kidnapping.

== Early life ==
Stevens was born in Stapleton Heights, Staten Island in 1879. In his youth he moved with his parents to Long Branch, New Jersey, where he graduated from Chattle High School in 1897 (since renamed as Long Branch High School). He studied at the State Normal School (now The College of New Jersey) in Trenton and then entered the law office of Public Utility Commission President John W. Slocum. He attended New York Law School, receiving a Bachelor of Laws degree in 1901, and was admitted to the New Jersey Bar the following year.

== Career ==
In 1912, when Long Branch adopted the commission form of government, Stevens was named City Solicitor. He served until 1921, when he was appointed Monmouth County Solicitor.

His political career began in 1919 when he was elected to fill an unexpired term in the New Jersey Senate. He was re-elected to a full term in 1920 and again in 1923 and 1926. He was selected by his fellow Senate Republicans as floor leader in 1923. In 1928 he became President of the Senate, serving as Acting Governor while Governor A. Harry Moore was out of the state.

In 1929, Governor Morgan F. Larson appointed him to a five-year term as New Jersey Attorney General. When the Lindbergh kidnapping occurred in March 1932, Stevens took personal charge of the case, since Hunterdon County, where the crime took place, had no prosecutor at the time. This paved the way for Stevens' successor, David T. Wilentz, to lead the prosecution of Bruno Hauptmann in the 1935 trial.

While Attorney General Stevens also led the fight against pollution of New Jersey beaches by garbage dumped at sea. He succeeded in forcing New York authorities to dispose of garbage by incineration.

After his tenure as Attorney General he returned to Monmouth County to serve as solicitor for Deal, West Long Branch, Little Silver, and Rumson. He was also a partner in the law firm of Applegate, Stevens, Foster, & Reussille in Red Bank.

Stevens died in 1941 at the University of Pennsylvania Hospital in Philadelphia after undergoing a brain operation. He was 61.

Political offices
Preceded by Francis B. Davis	President of the New Jersey Senate; 1928	Succeeded by Thomas A. Mathis
Legal offices
Preceded by Edward L. Katzenbach	Attorney General of New Jersey; 1929 – 1934	Succeeded by David T. Wilentz
