= Senator Ackerson =

Senator Ackerson may refer to:

- Henry E. Ackerson Jr. (1880–1970), New Jersey State Senate
- Jon Ackerson (born 1943), Kentucky State Senate
