= Edward L. Katzenbach =

American lawyer and politician, 28th Attorney General of New Jersey

28th Attorney General of New Jersey
- In office 1924–1929
- Governor: George S. Silzer
- Preceded by: Thomas F. McCran
- Succeeded by: William A. Stevens

Personal details
- Born: Edward Lawrence Katzenbach; October 2, 1878 Trenton, New Jersey, U.S.
- Died: December 18, 1934 (aged 56) Trenton, New Jersey, U.S.
- Party: Democratic
- Spouse: Marie Louise Hilson (m. 1911)
- Children: Edward Jr. and Nicholas
- Relatives: Frank S. Katzenbach (brother)
- Education: Princeton University (AB); Harvard University (LLB)

Edward Lawrence Katzenbach (October 2, 1878 – December 18, 1934) was the Attorney General of New Jersey from 1924 to 1929. He was the brother of New Jersey Supreme Court Justice Frank S. Katzenbach and the father of United States Attorney General Nicholas Katzenbach.

== Biography ==
Katzenbach was born in 1878 in Trenton, New Jersey, to Frank Snowden Katzenbach and Augusta (Mushbach) Katzenbach. He attended the State Model School and graduated from Princeton University in 1900. After graduation, he was appointed a fellow and instructor in political economy. He then attended Harvard Law School and graduated in 1905.

In November 1911 he married Marie Louise Hilson (December 8, 1882 – February 4, 1970) who later became the first female president of the State Board of Education. They had two sons: Edward Lawrence Katzenbach, Jr. (February 24, 1919 – April 23, 1974), who served as Deputy Assistant Secretary of Defense for Education and Manpower Resources under John F. Kennedy, and Nicholas Katzenbach (January 17, 1922 – May 8, 2012), United States Attorney General and Under Secretary of State under Lyndon B. Johnson.

In 1922 Katzenbach was appointed by Governor Edward I. Edwards to the State Board of Institutions and Agencies. He resigned from the board in February 1924 when he was appointed by Governor George S. Silzer to be Attorney General. He served in that position for a five-year term, until 1929.

From 1929 Katzenbach was a lecturer in politics at Princeton. He was also on the board of trustees of Rutgers University. In 1934 he died at his Trenton home after an extended illness at the age of 56.

Legal offices
Preceded by Thomas F. McCran	Attorney General of New Jersey; 1924 – 1929	Succeeded by William A. Stevens
