= 1907 New Jersey gubernatorial election =

- November 5, 1907
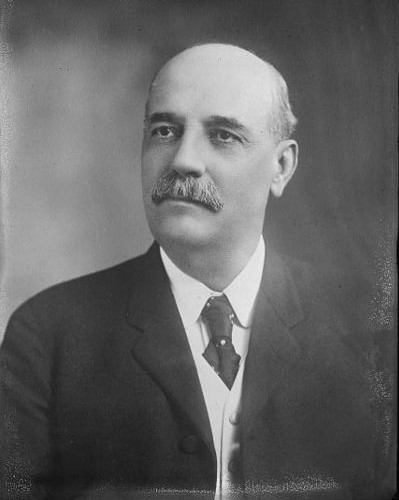

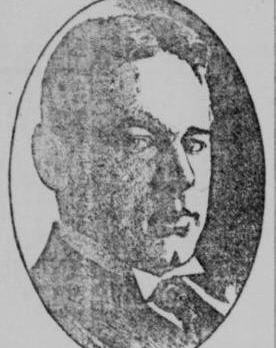
Nominee	John Franklin Fort	Frank S. Katzenbach
Party	Republican	Democratic
Popular vote	194,313	186,300
Percentage	49.28%	47.25%
- County results Fort: 40–50% 50–60% 60–70% Katzenbach: 40–50% 50–60%
Governor before election
Edward C. Stokes
Republican
Elected Governor
John Franklin Fort
Republican

The 1907 New Jersey gubernatorial election was held on November 5, 1907. Republican nominee John Franklin Fort defeated Democratic nominee Frank S. Katzenbach with 49.28% of the vote.

This was the Republicans fifth straight gubernatorial victory, the party's longest in history.

== Republican nomination ==
=== Candidates ===
- J. Franklin Fort, Associate Justice of the New Jersey Supreme Court
- Vivian M. Lewis, New Jersey Clerk in Chancery
- Mahlon Pitney, Associate Justice of the New Jersey Supreme Court
- Frank H. Sommer, Essex County Sheriff

=== Results ===
The Republican State Convention was held in Trenton on September 10.

1907 New Jersey Republican Convention
Party	Candidate	Votes	%
Republican	J. Franklin Fort	753	65.59%
Republican	Vivian M. Lewis	179	15.59%
Republican	Frank Sommer	120	10.45%
Republican	Mahlon Pitney	96	8.36%
Total votes		1,148	100.00%

== Democratic nomination ==
=== Candidates ===
- John Hinchliffe, former Mayor of Paterson and State Senator
- Frank S. Katzenbach, Mayor of Trenton
- James E. Martine, former member of the Plainfield Common Council and candidate for U.S. Representative in 1906

=== Results ===
The Democratic State Convention was held in Trenton on September 17.

1907 New Jersey Democratic Convention
Party	Candidate	Votes	%
Democratic	Frank S. Katzenbach	1,093.5	90.86%
Democratic	John Hinchliffe	75	6.23%
Democratic	James E. Martine	35	2.91%
Total votes		1,203.5	100.00%

== General election ==
=== Candidates ===
- John C. Butterworth (Socialist Labor)
- John Franklin Fort, Associate Justice of the New Jersey Supreme Court (Republican)
- Frank S. Katzenbach, Mayor of Trenton (Democratic)
- Frederick Krafft, activist and business manager of the New Yorker Volkszeitung (Socialist)
- James G. Mason (Prohibition)

=== Results ===
New Jersey gubernatorial election, 1907
Party	Candidate	Votes	%	±%
Republican	John Franklin Fort	194,313	49.28%	▼4.22
Democratic	Frank S. Katzenbach	186,300	47.25%	▲5.69
Socialist	Frederick Krafft	6,848	1.74%	▼0.31
Prohibition	James G. Mason	5,255	1.33%	▼0.22
Socialist Labor	John C. Butterworth	1,568	0.40%	▼0.18
Majority				
Total votes		394,284	100.00%	
Republican hold		Swing		
