= Senator Slocum =

Senator Slocum may refer to:

- Bill Slocum (1947–2023), Pennsylvania State Senate
- John W. Slocum (1867–1938), New Jersey State Senate
