= Nicholas Katzenbach =

American lawyer (1922–2012)

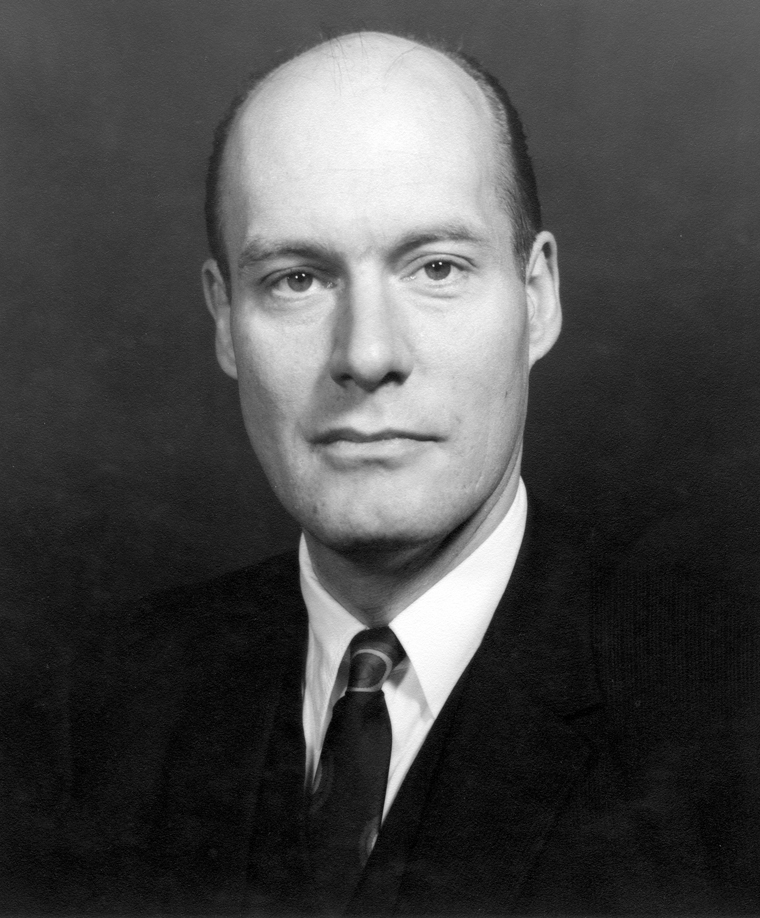
- Official portrait of Katzenbach, c. 1962

24th United States Under Secretary of State
- In office November 28, 1966 – January 20, 1969
- President: Lyndon B. Johnson
- Preceded by: George Ball
- Succeeded by: Elliot Richardson

65th United States Attorney General
- In office September 4, 1964 – November 28, 1966 (Note: Acting: September 4, 1964 – February 11, 1965)
- President: Lyndon B. Johnson
- Deputy: Ramsey Clark
- Preceded by: Robert F. Kennedy
- Succeeded by: Ramsey Clark

7th United States Deputy Attorney General
- In office April 16, 1962 – January 28, 1965
- President: John F. Kennedy; Lyndon B. Johnson
- Preceded by: Byron White
- Succeeded by: Ramsey Clark

Personal details
- Born: Nicholas deBelleville Katzenbach; January 17, 1922 Philadelphia, Pennsylvania, U.S.
- Died: May 8, 2012 (aged 90) Skillman, New Jersey, U.S.
- Party: Democratic
- Spouse: Lydia King Phelps Stokes (m. 1946)
- Children: 4, including John
- Parents: Edward L. Katzenbach; Marie Hilson Katzenbach
- Education: Princeton University (AB); Yale University (LLB); Balliol College, Oxford

Military service
- Branch/service: United States Army; Army Air Forces
- Unit: 381st Bombardment Squadron
- Battles/wars: World War II; Mediterranean theater; European theater

Nicholas deBelleville Katzenbach (January 17, 1922 – May 8, 2012) was an American lawyer who served as United States Attorney General during the Lyndon B. Johnson administration. He had previously served as United States Deputy Attorney General under President John F. Kennedy.

== Early life and education ==
Katzenbach was born in Philadelphia and raised in Trenton, New Jersey. His parents were Edward L. Katzenbach, who served as Attorney General of New Jersey, and Marie Hilson Katzenbach, who was the first female president of the New Jersey State Board of Education. His uncle, Frank S. Katzenbach, served as Mayor of Trenton, New Jersey and as a Justice of the New Jersey Supreme Court.

He was named after his mother's great-great-grandfather, Nicolas de Belleville (1753–1831), a French medical doctor who accompanied Kazimierz Pułaski to America and settled in Trenton in 1778. Katzenbach was raised an Episcopalian, and was partly of German descent.

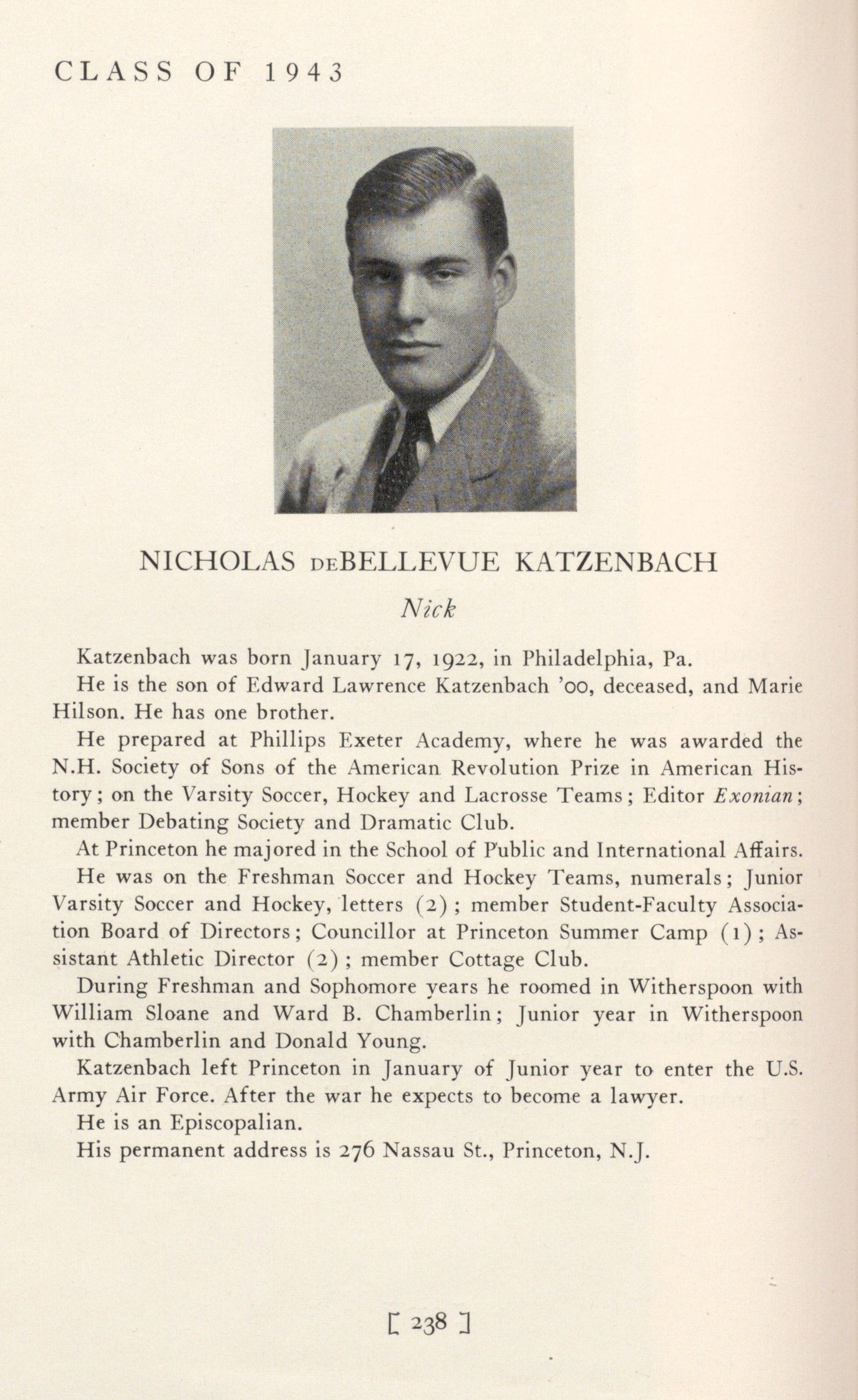
Katzenbach in the Princeton University yearbook, 1943

He attended Phillips Exeter Academy and was accepted into Princeton University. Katzenbach was a junior at Princeton in 1941 when he enlisted in the U.S. Armed Forces right after Pearl Harbor and served in the United States Army Air Corps in World War II. He was assigned as a navigator in the 381st Bombardment Squadron, 310th Bomb Group in North Africa. His North American B-25 Mitchell bomber was shot down February 23, 1943, over the Mediterranean Sea off North Africa. He spent more than two years as a prisoner of war in Italian and German POW camps, including Stalag Luft III, the site of the "Great Escape", in which Katzenbach assisted. He read extensively as a prisoner and ran an informal class based on Principles of Common Law.

He received his A.B., cum laude, from Princeton University in 1945 (partly based on Princeton giving him credit for the 500-odd books he had read in captivity). As part of his degree, Katzenbach completed a senior thesis titled The Little Steel Formula: An Historical Appraisal. He received an LL.B., cum laude, from Yale Law School in 1947, where he served as editor-in-chief of the Yale Law Journal. From 1947 to 1949, he was a Rhodes Scholar at Balliol College, Oxford.

On June 8, 1946, Katzenbach married Lydia King Phelps Stokes, in a ceremony officiated by her uncle, Anson Phelps Stokes, former canon of the Washington National Cathedral. Her father was Harold Phelps Stokes, a newspaper correspondent and secretary to Herbert Hoover.

Katzenbach was admitted to the New Jersey bar in 1950 and the Connecticut bar in 1955. He was an associate in the law firm of Katzenbach, Gildea and Rudner in 1950.

== Government service ==
From 1950 to 1952, he was attorney-advisor in the Office of General Counsel to the Secretary of the Air Force. Katzenbach was on the faculty of Rutgers Law School from 1950 to 1951; was an associate professor of law at Yale from 1952 to 1956; and was a professor of law at the University of Chicago from 1956 to 1960.

He served in the U.S. Department of Justice as Assistant Attorney General of the Office of Legal Counsel in 1961–1962 and as Deputy Attorney General appointed by President John F. Kennedy in 1962. After the assassination of President Kennedy, Katzenbach continued to serve with the Johnson administration. On February 11, 1965 President Johnson appointed Katzenbach the 65th Attorney General of the United States, and he held the office until October 2, 1966. He then served as Under Secretary of State from 1966 to 1969. While Under Secretary of State, he commented on the 1967 USS Liberty incident: “There was nobody I think who did not believe that the Israelis knew it was an American ship that they were attacking.”

In September 2008, Katzenbach published a memoir about his years in government service.

== The "Stand in the Schoolhouse Door" ==
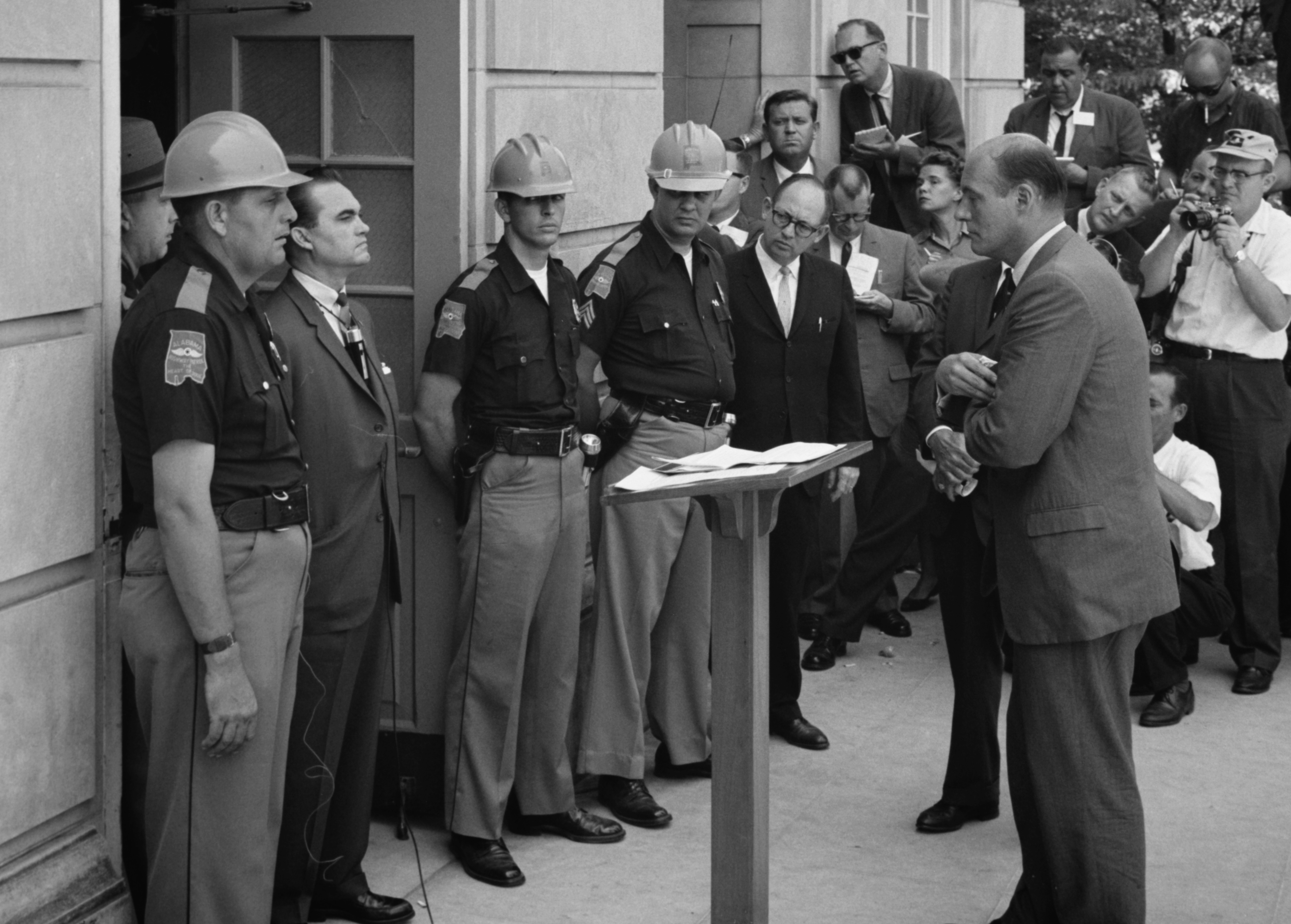
Alabama Governor George Wallace (in front of door) standing defiantly against desegregation while being confronted by Katzenbach (standing opposite Wallace) at the University of Alabama.

On June 11, 1963, Katzenbach was a primary participant in one of the most famous incidents of the Civil Rights struggle. Alabama Governor George Wallace stood in front of Foster Auditorium at the University of Alabama in an attempt to stop desegregation of that institution by the enrollment of two black students, Vivian Malone and James Hood. This became known as the "Stand in the Schoolhouse Door". With a U.S. Marshal and a U.S. attorney at his side, Katzenbach read a statement from President Kennedy demanding that the university allow the students to attend. Hours later, Wallace stood aside only after being ordered to do so by Alabama National Guard General Henry V. Graham, as Katzenbach walked in with the students to have them admitted.

== Role in JFK assassination investigation ==
Katzenbach has been credited with providing advice after the assassination of John F. Kennedy that led to the creation of the Warren Commission. On November 25, 1963, he sent a memo to Johnson's White House aide Bill Moyers recommending the creation of a Presidential Commission to investigate the assassination. To combat speculation of a conspiracy, Katzenbach said the results of the FBI's investigation should be made public. He wrote, in part: "The public must be satisfied that Oswald was the assassin; that he did not have confederates who are still at large".

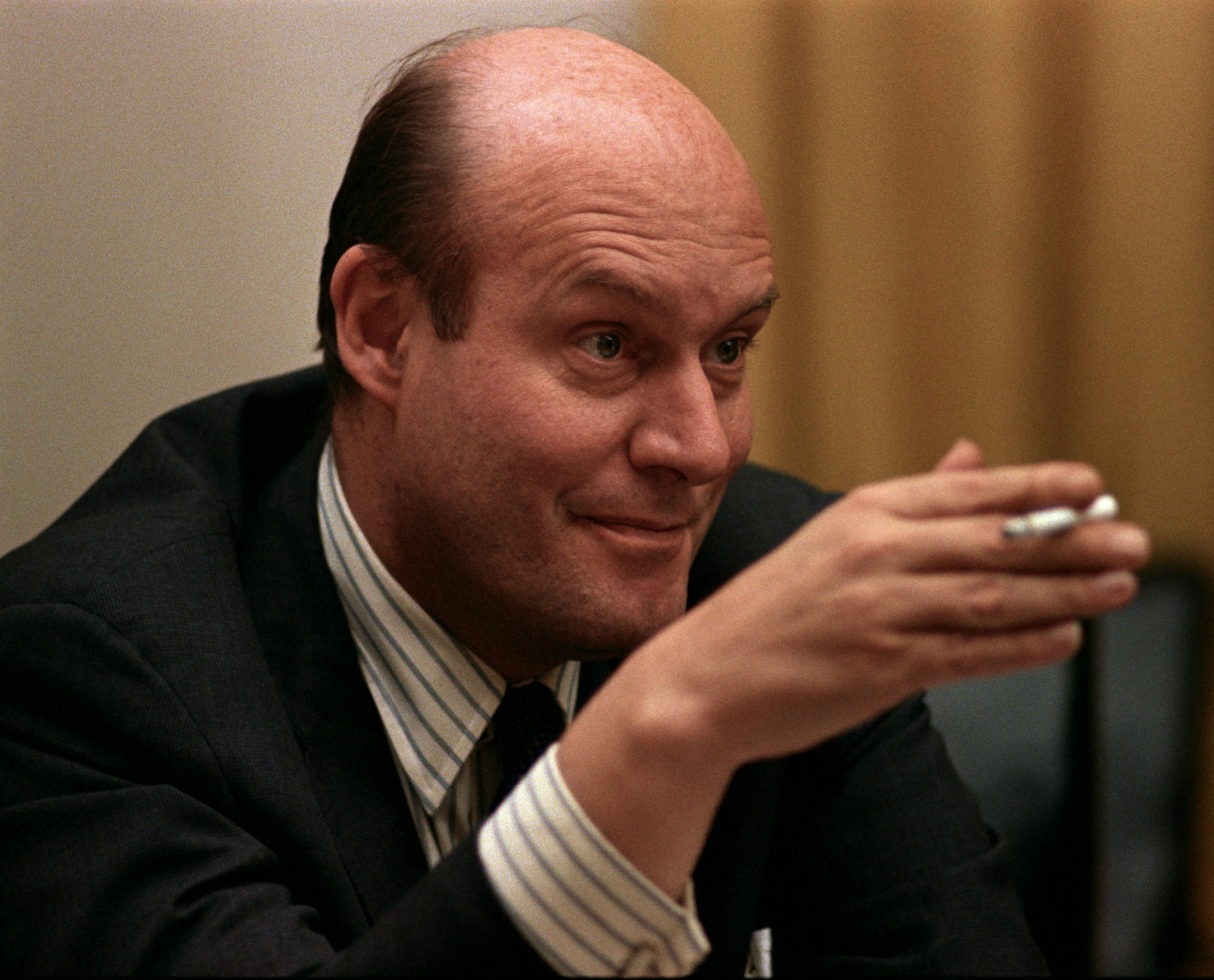
Katzenbach at White House, 6 May 1968

Four days after Katzenbach's memo, Johnson appointed some of the nation's most prominent figures, including the Chief Justice of the United States, to the Commission. Conspiracy theorists later called the memo, one of thousands of files released by the National Archives in 1994, the first sign of a cover-up by the government. He was interviewed for the 1992 documentary The JFK Assassination: The Jim Garrison Tapes.

== Later years ==
Katzenbach left government service to work for IBM in 1969, where he served as general counsel during the lengthy antitrust case filed by the Department of Justice seeking the break-up of IBM. He and Cravath, Swaine & Moore attorney Thomas Barr led the case for the computer giant for 13 years until the government finally decided to drop it in 1982. Later Katzenbach led the opposition against the case filed by the European Economic Community.

He retired from IBM in 1986 and became a partner at the firm of Riker, Danzig, Scherer, Hyland & Perretti in New Jersey. He was named chairman of the failing Bank of Credit and Commerce International (BCCI) in 1991.

In 1980, Katzenbach testified in the United States District Court for the District of Columbia for the defense of W. Mark Felt, later revealed to be the "Deep Throat" of the Watergate scandal and later Deputy Director of the FBI; accused and later found guilty of ordering illegal wiretaps on American citizens.

In December 1996, Katzenbach was one of New Jersey's fifteen members of the Electoral College, who cast their votes for the Clinton/Gore ticket.

Katzenbach also testified on behalf of President Clinton on December 8, 1998, before the House Judiciary Committee hearing, considering whether to impeach President Clinton.

In July 2002, Katzenbach joined the board of MCI Communications. In March 2004, he was elected as non-executive chairman of the MCI's board, effective after MCI emerged from Chapter 11 bankruptcy protection. MCI later merged with Verizon.

Katzenbach was a member of both the American Academy of Arts and Sciences and the American Philosophical Society.

Katzenbach and his wife Lydia retired to the Princeton, New Jersey area, with a summer home in West Tisbury, Massachusetts on Martha's Vineyard. His son is writer John Katzenbach. His daughter, Maria, is also a published novelist.

After the death of W. Willard Wirtz in April 2010, Katzenbach became the oldest surviving former U.S. Cabinet member. Katzenbach died at his home in the Skillman section of Montgomery Township, New Jersey, on May 8, 2012, at the age of 90.

== See also ==
- Some of It Was Fun: Working with RFK and LBJ (W. W. Norton) – publisher web site
- Video: Nicholas Katzenbach talks about his youth (bigthink.com)
- Video: Nicholas Katzenbach on RFK and LBJ (bigthink.com)
- Video: Nicholas Katzenbach compares Vietnam and Iraq (bigthink.com)
- The Best and the Brightest
- Katzenbach appears in archival footage of his confrontation with Gov. Wallace in the movie Forrest Gump

== Bibliography ==
- Katzenbach, Nicholas (2008). Some of It Was Fun: Working with RFK and LBJ. New York: W.W. Norton. ISBN 978-0-393-06725-5.

Legal offices
| Preceded by Robert Kramer | United States Assistant Attorney General for the Office of Legal Counsel; 1961–1962 | Succeeded by Norbert Schlei |
| Preceded by Byron White | United States Deputy Attorney General; 1962–1965 | Succeeded by Ramsey Clark |
| Preceded by Robert F. Kennedy | United States Attorney General; Acting:1964–1965; 1964–1966 | Succeeded by Ramsey Clark |
Political offices
| Preceded by George Ball | Undersecretary of State; 1966–1969 | Succeeded by Elliot Richardson |
