= Henry E. Ackerson Jr. =

American judge (1880–1970)

Associate Justice of the Supreme Court of New Jersey
- In office 1948–1952
- Appointed by: Alfred E. Driscoll
- Preceded by: Office created
- Succeeded by: William J. Brennan Jr.

New Jersey Court of Errors and Appeals
- In office February 11, 1919 – 1947
- Succeeded by: Office eliminated

Member of the New Jersey Senate from Monmouth County
- In office 1915 – February 11, 1919
- Preceded by: John W. Slocum
- Succeeded by: William A. Stevens

Personal details
- Born: Henry Elijah Ackerson Jr. October 15, 1880 Holmdel Township, New Jersey
- Died: December 9, 1970 (aged 90) Holmdel Township, New Jersey
- Party: Democratic
- Spouse: Edith D. Calef (m. 1912; died 1969)
- Children: 2
- Education: New York Law School

Henry Elijah Ackerson Jr. (October 15, 1880 – December 9, 1970) was an American attorney, jurist and Democratic Party politician who served in the New Jersey Senate from 1915 to 1919 and as a judge of the state's highest court from 1919 to 1952.

== Early life and education ==
Henry Elijah Ackerson Jr. was born in Holmdel Township on October 15, 1880 to Cornelius Ackerson and Anna (née Bray) Ackerson. He was descended from early Dutch settlers who arrived in the country around 1650. In 1890, the family moved to Keyport, where he received most of his early education in the public school. He graduated from Keyport High School in 1898 with high honors.

After graduation, he was employed as a clerk at the People's National Bank of Keyport before entering the Packard Commercial School in New York City. After leaving Packard, he worked as a secretary to the manager of a New York brokerage firm and studied law at night classes at Senftner Preparatory School. In 1900, he passed the New York Regents examination and was admitted to New York Law School, where he graduated at the head of the class in 1902.

== Legal career ==
As a result of his high marks, Ackerman was hired as a professor. He taught for two years while working at a law firm in Jersey City. He was admitted to the New Jersey bar as an attorney on March 7, 1904 and moved home to Keyport to open an independent practice in 1906. admitted as a counselor and Master in Chancery on November 28, 1909. He formed a partnership with his brother, Cecil S. Ackerson, in 1916.

Beginning in 1909, Ackerman served as public attorney for Keyport (until 1914) and Holmdel. He served as counsel to the Monmouth County Board of Chosen Freeholders beginning in 1914. He also served as a director and attorney for the People's National Bank of Keyport.

== Political career ==
In 1914, Ackerman was elected to the New Jersey Senate on the Democratic Party ticket. He was re-elected in 1917. He served as minority leader during the 1916 session and was the minority nominee for Senate president. In 1919, he served as minority leader again and as a member of the legislative delegation to draft a supplementary treaty with New York for the development of the Port of New York.

Ackerman resigned from the Senate after he was appointed as a judge of the New Jersey Court of Errors and Appeals.

== Judicial service ==
Ackerman was appointed to the New Jersey Court of Errors and Appeals, the highest appellate court in the state, on February 11, 1919.

When the court was eliminated as part of the 1947 state constitutional reforms, Ackerman was appointed as an associate justice on its successor, the Supreme Court of New Jersey, where he served until his retirement in 1952. He was succeeded by future Supreme Court of the United States justice William J. Brennan Jr.

== Personal life and death ==
Ackerson married Edith Dart Calef in Middletown, Connecticut on April 5, 1910. Their first son, Cornelius, was born in 1912, and their second, Calef, was born in 1916. He was a member and regent of the Royal Arcanum.

Ackerson lived in Keyport until his retirement from the bench. He eventually moved to a nursing home in Holmdel, where he died on December 9, 1970. He was interred at Holmdel Cemetery.

=== Legacy ===
Ackerson Hall in Newark is named in his honor and was the home of Rutgers Law School from 1966 to 1978. It is still an academic building at Rutgers University–Newark, The Justice Henry E. Ackerson Jr. Prize, awarded to the student "who has most distinguished himself or herself in the area of legal skills" is named in his honor.

== See also ==
- List of justices of the Supreme Court of New Jersey
- New Jersey Court of Errors and Appeals
- Courts of New Jersey
