= Marie H. Katzenbach School for the Deaf =

Public boarding school in New Jersey, US

Coordinates: 40°15′15″N 74°48′47″W

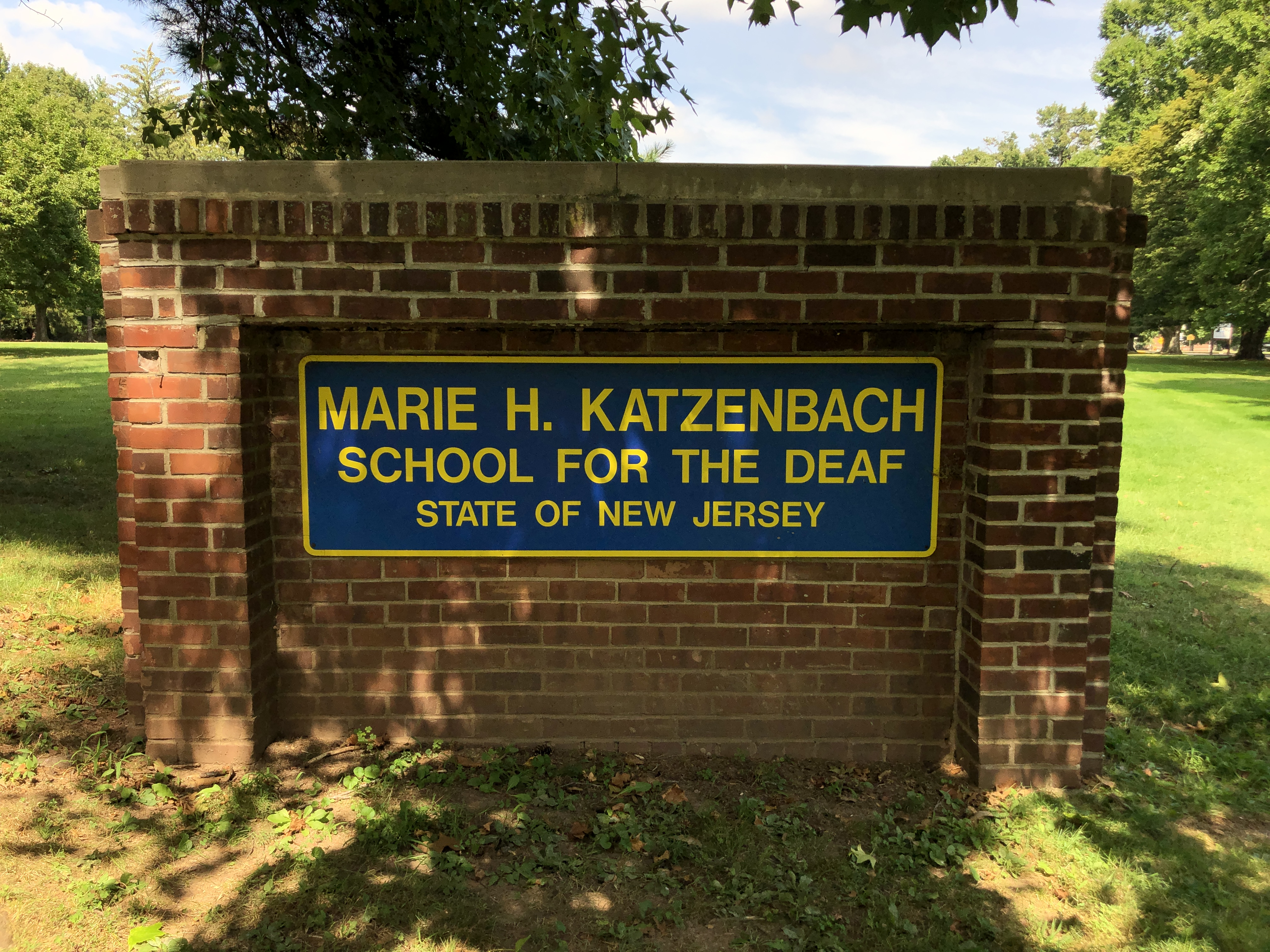
Marie H. Katzenbach School for the Deaf entrance

Marie H. Katzenbach School for the Deaf (MKSD), also known as the New Jersey School for the Deaf and Blind, initially the New Jersey State Institution for the Deaf, is a K–12 statewide school in West Trenton, Ewing Township, New Jersey, United States. Its age range is pre-Kindergarten to age 21. The New Jersey Department of Education oversees the school. It is named after Marie Hilson Katzenbach.

== History ==
The New Jersey Legislature began funding education specially tailored to deaf students, at first sent to schools out of state, in 1821. The school was first established in 1882 by the legislature even though funding for it was first appropriated in 1832. The school opened in 1883 in the former Soldiers’ Children's Home of New Jersey in Trenton. Circa 1893 the New Jersey State Board of Education assumed responsibility of the school, which resulted in it being overseen by the department. It was renamed the New Jersey School for the Deaf in 1900 and moved to West Trenton circa 1920, with the elementary opening there in 1823 and subsequent grades afterward. It received its current name in 1965.

In the 1960s an epidemic of German measles deafened many New Jersey children, leading to MKSD's peak enrollment, with the student population up to 600. Enrollment remained constant in subsequent periods.

== Campus ==
The campus has the Cooley Farmhouse.

It also has a boarding facility.

== Student body ==
In 1973 it had 108 day students and 494 boarding students. About 40% were children of deaf people. 32 of the students were from Bergen County. Because Bergen County has its own elementary school for the deaf, the Bergen County students skewed older. At the time the school was at capacity and only admitting about half of its applicants.

In 1990 it had 285 students, there were 28, 19, and 21, respectively, from Middlesex, Monmouth, and Ocean counties.
