= 1922 New Jersey gubernatorial election =

- November 7, 1922
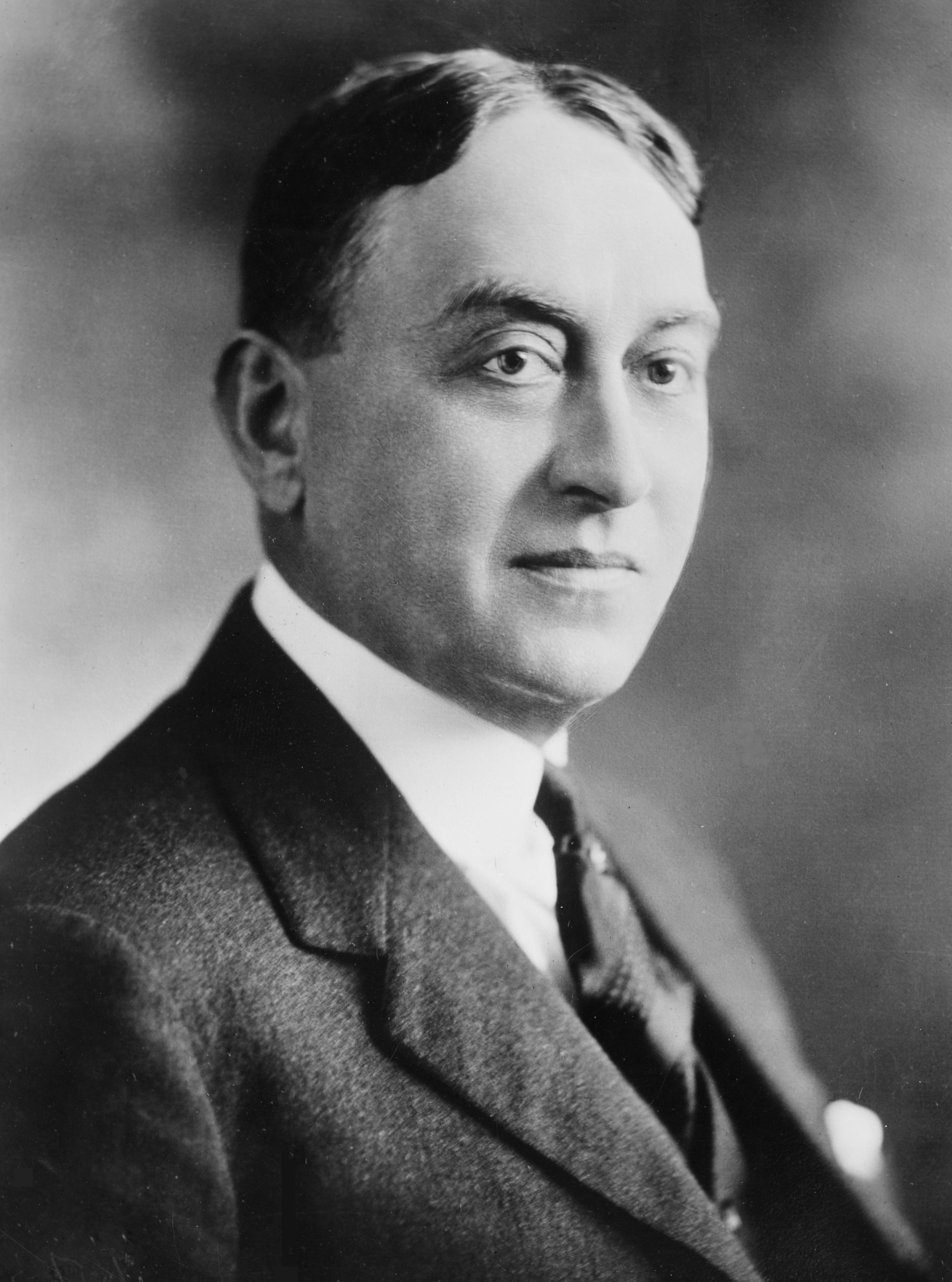

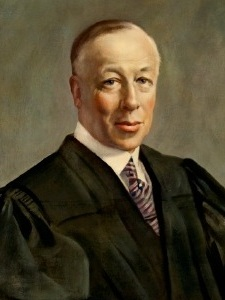
Nominee	George Sebastian Silzer	William Nelson Runyon
Party	Democratic	Republican
Popular vote	427,206	383,312
Percentage	52.19%	46.82%
- County results Silzer: 40–50% 50–60% 70–80% Runyon: 40–50% 50–60% 60–70%
Governor before election
Edward I. Edwards
Democratic
Elected Governor
George Sebastian Silzer
Democratic

The 1922 New Jersey gubernatorial election was held on November 7, 1922. Democratic nominee George Sebastian Silzer defeated Republican nominee William Nelson Runyon with 52.19% of the vote.

== Democratic primary ==
=== Candidates ===
- George Sebastian Silzer, judge and former State Senator for Middlesex County

==== Withdrew ====
- William E. Tuttle Jr., New Jersey Commissioner of Banking and former U.S. Representative from Westfield

=== Campaign ===
George Sebastian Silzer ran with the backing of Jersey City boss Frank Hague and as a firm opponent of Prohibition. The race was a two-way contest between Silzer and William E. Tuttle Jr. until Tuttle abruptly withdrew in early September, citing his health and leaving both candidates unopposed in their respective primaries. Tuttle ultimately died on February 11, 1923, less than a year after the primary.

== Republican primary ==
=== Candidates ===
- William Nelson Runyon, State Senator for Union County and former acting Governor

=== Campaign ===
The uncontested primary was largely uneventful until August, when a member of the Democratic State Committee accused Runyon, a supporter of Prohibition, of delivering a speech in Collingswood under the influence of alcohol. Both Democratic candidates were in attendance at the event and personally rebuked the claim, which the committeewoman, Katharine McTague Donges, denied making. Runyon demanded a full retraction, threatening a libel suit against Donges. Around the same time, Governor Edward I. Edwards allegedly made a similar insinuation regarding a speech Runyon delivered in Sea Girt, though Edwards denied the claim.

== General election ==
=== Candidates ===
- George A. Goebel (Socialist)
- William Nelson Runyon, State Senator for Union County and former acting Governor (Republican)
- George Sebastian Silzer, judge and former State Senator for Middlesex County (Democratic)

=== Results ===
New Jersey gubernatorial election, 1922
Party	Candidate	Votes	%	±%
Democratic	George Sebastian Silzer	427,206	52.19%	
Republican	William Nelson Runyon	383,312	46.82%	
Socialist	George A. Goebel	5,644	0.69%	
Majority				
Turnout				
Democratic hold		Swing		
