= Marie Hilson Katzenbach =

American educator

- Born: December 8, 1882
- Died: February 4, 1970 (aged 87)
- Children: Edward Lawrence Katzenbach, Jr. Nicholas Katzenbach

Marie Louise Hilson Katzenbach (December 8, 1882 – February 4, 1970) was an American educator who was the

first female president of the New Jersey State Board of Education.

Marie Louise Hilson was born in 1882 in Trenton, New Jersey, to Cleaveland Hilson and Matilda Emily Hunt. She was the great-great-granddaughter of Nicholas de Belleville (1753–1831), a French medical doctor who accompanied Casimir Pulaski to America and settled in Trenton in 1778, and Moore Furman (1728–1808), the first mayor of Trenton.

She attended the Trenton Model School and at 18 went to work at an orphanage, the Union Industrial Home. She pushed for the children at the home to be educated in public schools, and when she joined the Board of Managers in 1913, she advocated for psychiatric treatment and special education. She also worked as a librarian at the Trenton Free Library for 10 years, serving as chief of the cataloguing department.

In November 1911 she married Edward L. Katzenbach, who would go on to serve as Attorney General of New Jersey from 1924 to 1929. They had two sons: Edward Lawrence Katzenbach, Jr. (February 24, 1919 – April 23, 1974), who served as Deputy Assistant Secretary of Defense for Education and Manpower Resources under John F. Kennedy, and Nicholas Katzenbach (January 17, 1922 – May 8, 2012), United States Attorney General and Under Secretary of State under Lyndon B. Johnson.

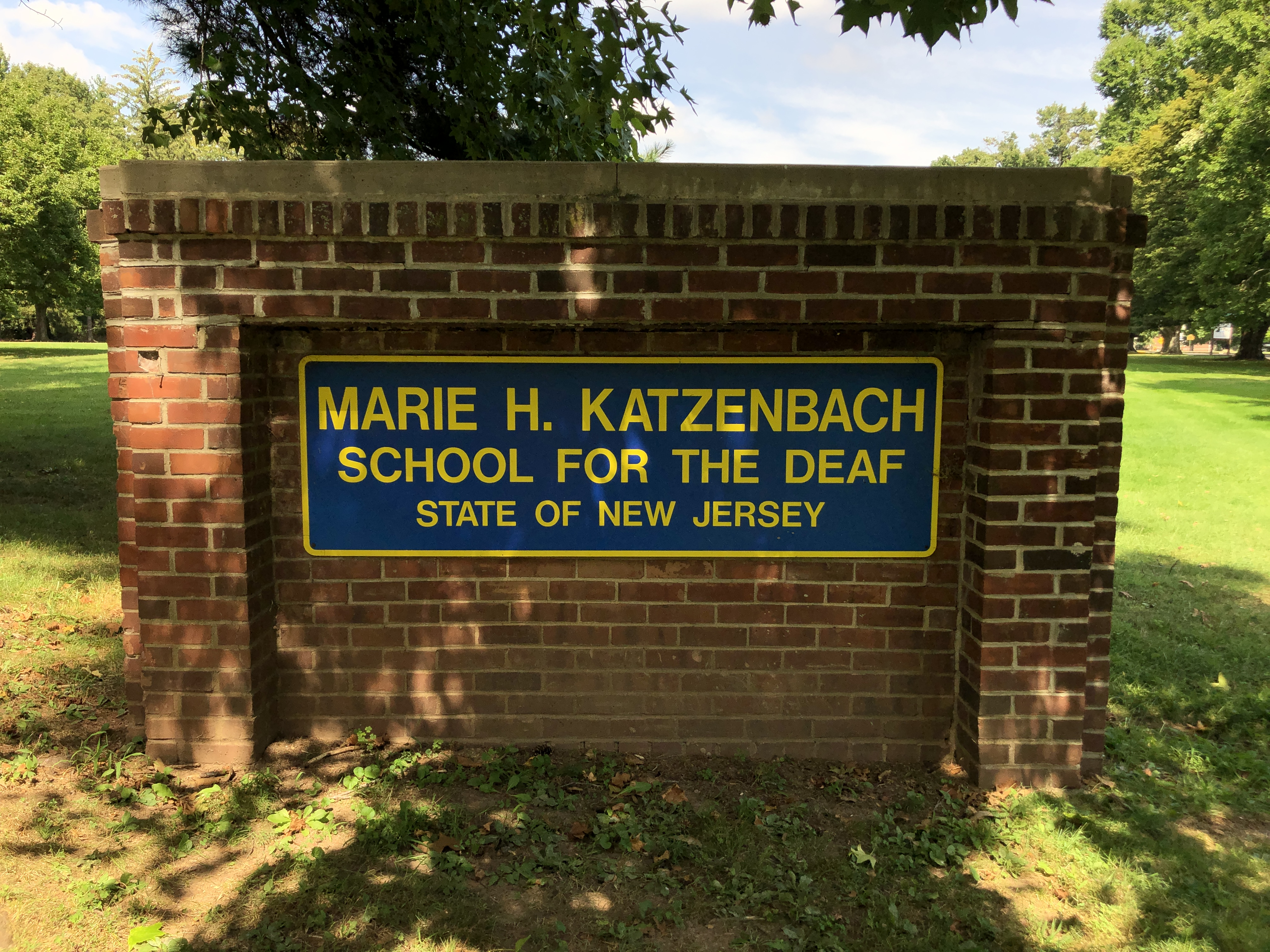
Marie H. Katzenbach School for the Deaf entrance

In 1921 she was appointed to the State Board of Education. Two years later she was named to the board for the New Jersey School for the Deaf and was involved in the planning of the school's Trenton campus. She would remain associated with the school for the rest of her life, and in 1965 it was renamed the Marie H. Katzenbach School for the Deaf in her honor.

During her tenure on the State Board of Education she was instrumental in the formation of the state college system, helping to transform two-year normal schools into four-year colleges. She also pushed for the designation of Rutgers as the State University in 1955, taking particular interest in developing Douglass College for women. Katzenbach Hall, a residential hall on the Douglass Campus built in 1963, is named for her.

In 1956 Katzenbach became the first woman to head the State Board of Education. She remained active on the Board until 1964, when, at the age 81, she was seriously injured when her car ran into the education building. She died in 1970 at the age of 87 at her home in Princeton, New Jersey.
