= Stapleton Heights, Staten Island =

Neighborhood in New York City

Coordinates: 40°37′48.5″N 74°5′4″W

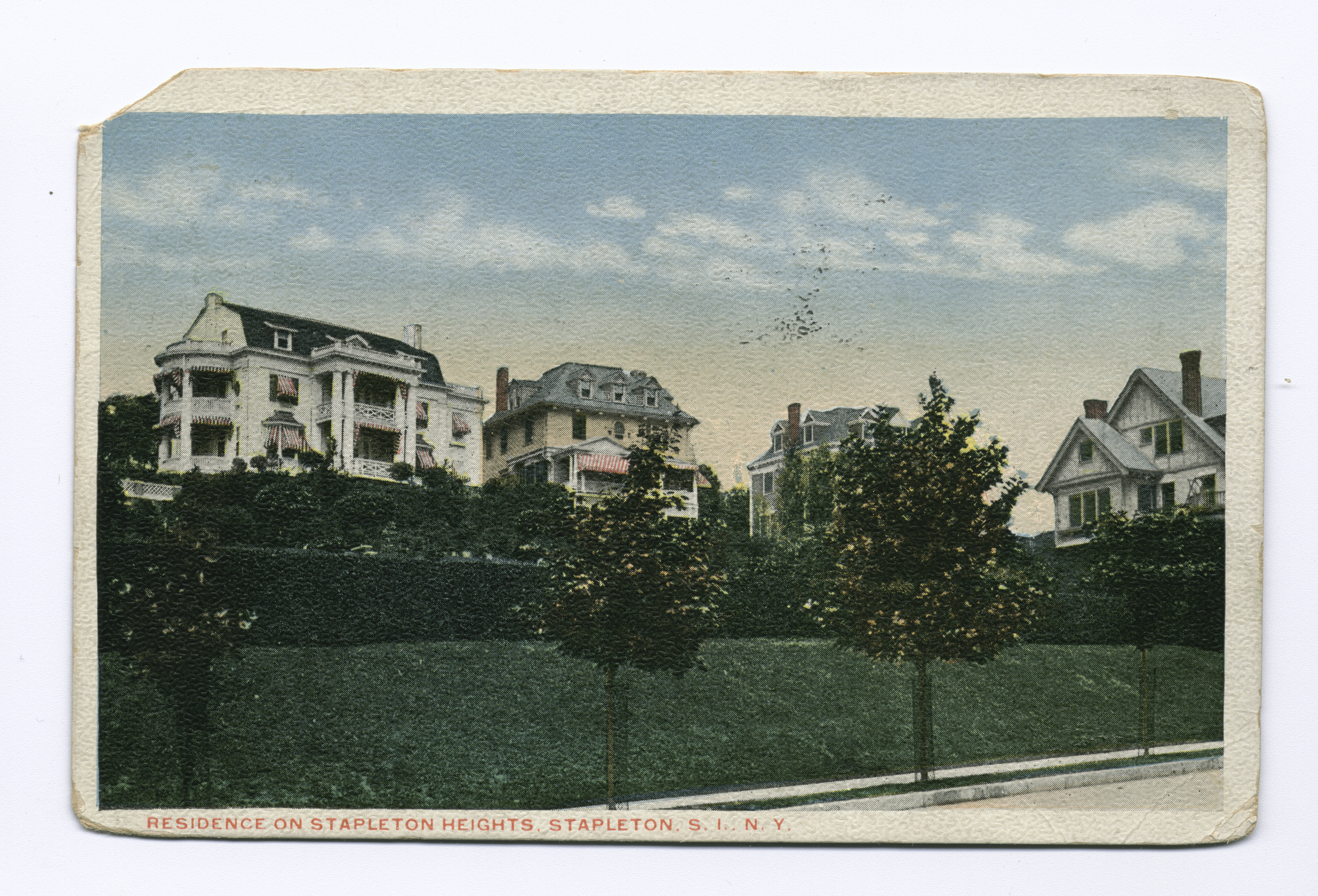
Postcard of a house in Stapleton Heights

Stapleton Heights (or Stapleton Hill) is a neighborhood in northeastern Staten Island, New York City. It stands on the second of a series of hills that form a "backbone" running diagonally across the island from northeast to southwest, between Ward Hill (the first of the hills as they rise from Tompkinsville) and Grymes Hill; to the east is Stapleton, which is along the waterfront. It is an upper-middle-class enclave noted for its large older one-family homes, and for its view of Upper New York Bay and the Verrazzano–Narrows Bridge. Many of the grander homes of the neighborhood were constructed in the late 19th century by the families who controlled the industries along the waterfront, including the breweries that operated there until the last one closed in 1963. One such home, on Louis Street, is allegedly "haunted," according to local residents.

Stapleton Heights is served by the S52 and S78 local buses.

== See also ==
- List of Staten Island neighborhoods
