= Frank S. Katzenbach =

American judge

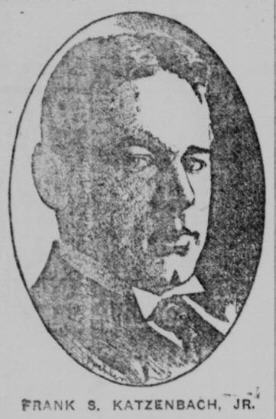
- Frank Snowden Katzenbach Jr. (1868-1929)

31st Mayor of Trenton, New Jersey
- In office 1902–1906
- Preceded by: Frank Obadiah Briggs
- Succeeded by: Frederick W. Gnichtel

Personal details
- Born: Frank Snowden Katzenbach; November 5, 1868 Trenton, New Jersey, U.S.
- Died: March 13, 1929 (aged 60) Trenton, New Jersey, U.S.
- Relatives: Edward L. Katzenbach (brother); Nicholas Katzenbach (nephew)
- Education: Princeton University; Columbia University

Frank Snowden Katzenbach, Jr. (November 5, 1868 – March 13, 1929) was an American jurist and Democratic party politician from New Jersey. He was an Associate Justice of the New Jersey Supreme Court and was the Democratic nominee for Governor of New Jersey in 1907. He was the brother of New Jersey Attorney General Edward L. Katzenbach and uncle of Nicholas Katzenbach, the United States Attorney General.

== Biography ==
Katzenbach was born in Trenton, New Jersey, in 1868 to Frank Snowden Katzenbach, Sr. and Augusta Mushbach. He attended the Model School and graduated from Princeton University in 1889, studied law at Columbia Law School and in the office of James Buchanan. Katzenbach was elected alderman-at-large in Trenton in 1898, and then was elected Mayor of Trenton, New Jersey, in 1901 and 1903.

At the Democratic State Convention of 1907, Katzenbach received the party's nomination for Governor of New Jersey. In the campaign against the Republican nominee John Franklin Fort, both candidates agreed on the creation of a public utilities commission, the enactment of civil service reform, and the adoption of direct primary elections. The election returns were extremely close, with many newspapers (including The New York Times) announcing the next day that Katzenbach had won. But late returns from Hudson County showed that Fort had eked out a victory.

Katzenbach continued practicing law until 1920, when he was appointed by Governor Edward Irving Edwards to the New Jersey Supreme Court. He served as a Justice until 1929.

He died in a Trenton, New Jersey, hospital from sepsis caused by a leg infection. He was 60.

== See also ==
- List of justices of the Supreme Court of New Jersey
- Mayor of Trenton, New Jersey
- New Jersey Court of Errors and Appeals
- Courts of New Jersey

Party political offices
Preceded by Charles C. Black	Democratic Nominee for Governor of New Jersey; 1907	Succeeded by Woodrow Wilson
