= Vivian M. Lewis =

American politician (1869–1950)

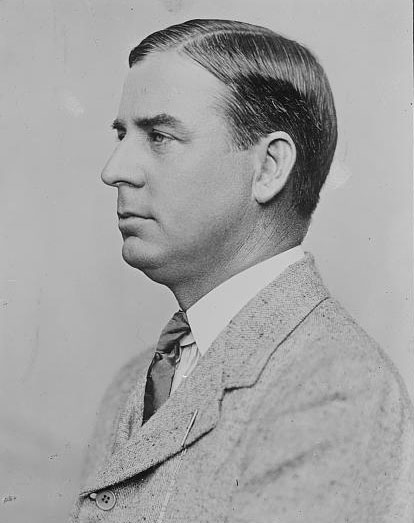

Member of the New Jersey General Assembly from Passaic County
- In office 1898–1902
- Succeeded by: Raymond Bogert

Personal details
- Born: June 8, 1869 Paterson, New Jersey, U.S.
- Died: March 14, 1950 (aged 80) Paterson, New Jersey, U.S.
- Party: Republican
- Spouses: Jane Campbell (div. 1906); Charlotte A. Jorgensen (m. 1916)
- Children: 2 sons (with Campbell)
- Occupation: Politician; lawyer

Vivian Murchison Lewis (June 8, 1869 – March 14, 1950) was an American jurist and politician. He was the Republican nominee for Governor of New Jersey in 1910, losing to Woodrow Wilson.

== Early life and education ==
Lewis was born in Paterson, New Jersey, in 1869 to Isaac Arriston and Hanna (Davies) Lewis. He attended local schools in Paterson. As was the custom of the time, he studied law with private tutors (read the law) and was admitted to the bar in 1892. During this time he also wrote for New York newspapers.

== Political career ==
Lewis joined the Republican Party and became politically active. In 1897 he was elected as a Republican to the New Jersey General Assembly. He was re-elected in 1899 and 1900, serving as majority leader in the Assembly during his last term.

In 1904 Lewis was elected City Counsel of Paterson. He resigned this position when Governor Franklin Murphy appointed him Clerk in Chancery (an office now known as Clerk of the Superior Court). Lewis filled the vacancy left by Edward C. Stokes, who resigned upon his inauguration as governor. He was renominated by Stokes for a full term in 1905. Lewis left the position of Clerk in Chancery in 1909 when he was appointed by Governor John Franklin Fort to be the State Commissioner of Banking and Insurance.

In 1907, Lewis was the runner-up for the Republican nomination for Governor, finishing behind John Franklin Fort at the September party convention.

In 1910, Lewis was nominated to be the Republican candidate for Governor of New Jersey, facing off against Democrat Woodrow Wilson, then President of Princeton University. Wilson ran a spirited campaign declaring his independence from machine politics, promising that party bosses would not control the state if he was elected. Lewis did not articulate an appealing campaign. Wilson soundly defeated Lewis in the general election by a margin of more than 49,000 votes. However, Republican William Howard Taft had carried New Jersey in the 1908 presidential election by more than 80,000 votes. Some historians think that Wilson benefited from former president Theodore Roosevelt's public campaign for progressive causes in this period.

In 1912, Lewis resigned from his position as banking commissioner to accept the judicial position of vice chancellorship from Chancellor Edwin Robert Walker. He was reappointed to this office in 1919, 1926, 1933 and 1940. He retired in 1947, when the powers of the chancellor and vice chancellors were absorbed by the Superior Court, under the new State Constitution.

== Marriage and family ==
Lewis married Jane Campbell (div. 1906) and they had two sons, Henry C. and John C. Lewis. He married Charlotte A. Jorgensen on September 27, 1916. He died in 1950 in Paterson at the age of 80.

Party political offices
Preceded by John Franklin Fort	Republican Nominee for Governor of New Jersey; 1910	Succeeded by Edward C. Stokes
