= George Sebastian Silzer =

American politician (1870–1940)

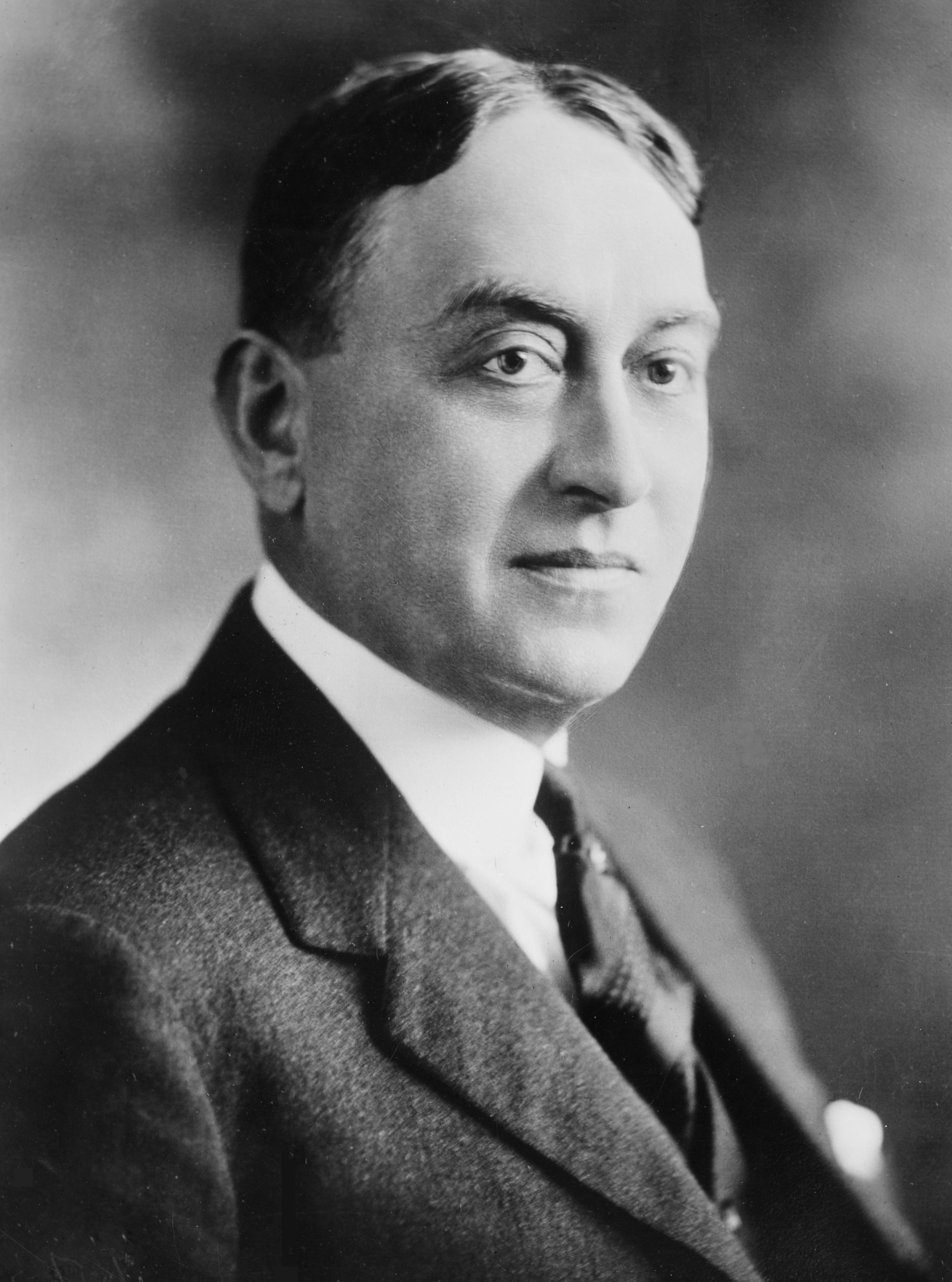

38th Governor of New Jersey
- In office January 15, 1923 – January 19, 1926
- Preceded by: Edward I. Edwards
- Succeeded by: A. Harry Moore

Chair of the Port Authority of New York and New Jersey
- In office 1926–1928
- Preceded by: Julian Gregory
- Succeeded by: John F. Galvin

Member of the New Jersey Senate from Middlesex County
- In office 1907–1912
- Preceded by: William H. C. Jackson
- Succeeded by: William E. Ramsay

Personal details
- Born: April 14, 1870 New Brunswick, New Jersey
- Died: October 16, 1940 (aged 70) Newark, New Jersey
- Party: Democratic
- Spouse: Henrietta T. Waite

George Sebastian Silzer (April 14, 1870 – October 16, 1940) was an American attorney, jurist, and Democratic Party politician who served as the 38th Governor of New Jersey from 1923 to 1926.

== Early life ==
Silzer was born on April 14, 1870, to Christina (née Zimmerman) and Theodore C. Silzer, a bar proprietor, in New Brunswick, New Jersey.

He attended local public grammar and high schools before reading law in the offices of J. Kearny Rice. He was admitted to the bar in 1892 and opened his own office in New Brunswick, which because increasingly successful until he became a state judge in 1914.

== Early political and judicial career ==
Silzer was a member of the New Brunswick board of aldermen from 1892 to 1896. For ten years, he was the chair of the Middlesex County Democratic Party.

In 1906, Silzer was elected to represent Middlesex in the New Jersey Senate, aided by the Bishops' Liquor Law. He was re-elected to a second three-year term in 1909.

In the Senate, Silzer was a leading member of the progressive faction. In 1910, Silzer campaigned for governor on a progressive, anti-machine platform and drew 210 votes at the state convention, but finished a distant third behind nominee Woodrow Wilson, who won the general election. Although Democrats were the minority party during his entire tenure in the Senate, Silzer led the passage of several measures during the Wilson administration, including a workmen's compensation law. He was one of Wilson's leading legislative allies.

In 1912, Wilson appointed Silzer to be Middlesex County prosecutor, and he resigned from the Senate. He served as prosecutor for two years until Governor James F. Fielder appointed him to the circuit court.

== Governor of New Jersey: 1923–1926 ==
=== 1922 election ===
Silzer had served as a judge for eight years when he was nominated as the Democratic candidate for governor in 1922. His nomination was part of a deal engineered by Hudson County boss Frank Hague; in exchange for Silzer's nomination for governor, Middlesex Democrats backed the outgoing governor, Edward I. Edwards of Jersey City, for U.S. Senate.

The general election campaign was dominated by the issue of Prohibition. Silzer's opponent was a conservative "dry" Republican and fellow judge, William N. Runyon, who backed full enforcement of the Volstead Act, whereas Silzer argued it went "far beyond" the terms of the Eighteenth Amendment. Silzer's victory was universally interpreted as a victory for alcohol liberalization and also confirmed Hague's domination of the New Jersey Democratic Party. Silzer won the state by far less than his margin in Hudson County.

=== Tenure ===
Silzer generally pursued a progressive policy agenda while in office, but the legislature passed few of his proposals.

His inaugural address criticized "special privilege" and promised to "put government back into the hands of the people." He proposed stringent public utilities regulation, protective labor legislation, and re-enactment of Wilson era restrictions on the coal industry. In later messages to the legislature, Silzer called for prison and tax reform; expansion of public welfare; strict controls on pollution, firearms, and narcotics; support for a federal anti-lynching law, and state securities regulation.

Unlike other Democratic governors of the period, Silzer avoided close cooperation with Frank Hague. He was also guaranteed a Republican legislature under the per-county apportionment system in place at the time, given that most Democratic votes came from a few urban counties. Though many of Silzer's proposals have been adopted in the century since, in most instances his legislative program failed to rally support. He was successful in winning restrictions on the employment of woman and child laborers and some expansions in the terms of the state workmen's compensation laws.

On occasion, he resorted to purely executive power. In 1923, Silzer directed the state attorney general to bring a suit against the Public Service Corporation amid a labor dispute. Silzer's threat led the public utilities giant to resolve the dispute and resume service.

=== Development projects ===
One area on which Silzer did make progress was transportation reform, as all parties agreed it was essential to stimulate population and industrial development in the years following the growth of the automobile and suburbs. Silzer supported extensive construction, though he opposed the bond issues that the legislature and electorate favored to fund these projects. Several of the proposals he backed were eventually completed, including the Delaware River Port Authority, the George Washington Bridge, and the three bridges connecting the state to Staten Island. He also oversaw the completion of the Holland Tunnel and initiated its incorporation into the new Port of New York Authority.

Silzer opened his term by recalling the entire state highway commission from office, a controversial act justified by his judgment that the commission was corrupt and incompetent, having allowed highway construction to become dominated by a few corporations. He named a four-man replacement board consisting of Walter Kidde, Hugh L. Scott, Abraham Jelin, and Percy Hamilton Stewart, but their nominations were blocked by the Senate. Instead, Silzer went directly to the voters and won support for his nominees.

Silzer also defended state zoning laws, stating, "We must also have in mind scientific planning which will make such development as attractive as possible. In these enlightened days, we cannot drift along and permit ugliness to dominate."

== Personal life ==
Silzer married Henrietta T. Waite. He was survived by one son, Parker W. Silzer.

== Later life and death ==
In 1926, his successor A. Harry Moore appointed Silzer as chairman of the Port of New York Authority. He oversaw the groundbreaking ceremonies for the George Washington Bridge and left office in 1928.

In 1933, Silzer published an analysis of state government titled The Government of a State.

Most of Silzer's life after politics was devoted to the law. In 1935, he defended mobster Dutch Schultz on federal income tax evasion charges; Schultz was acquitted but later assassinated by fellow mobsters when he attempted to murder prosecutor Thomas Dewey. In 1937, he was connected to the Lindbergh kidnapping when he was on the defense team for Ellis H. Parker, a Burlington County detective who kidnapped Trenton attorney Paul Wendel and coerced his signed confession to the kidnapping.

He died on October 16, 1940, of a heart attack as he was on his way to Newark Penn Station in Newark from his law offices in that city.

== See also ==
- List of governors of New Jersey

Political offices
| Preceded by Edward I. Edwards | Governor of New Jersey; January 15, 1923 – January 19, 1926 | Succeeded by A. Harry Moore |
Party political offices
| Preceded by Edward I. Edwards | Democratic Nominee for Governor of New Jersey; 1922 | Succeeded by A. Harry Moore |
