= Frederick Krafft =

American politician (1860–1933)

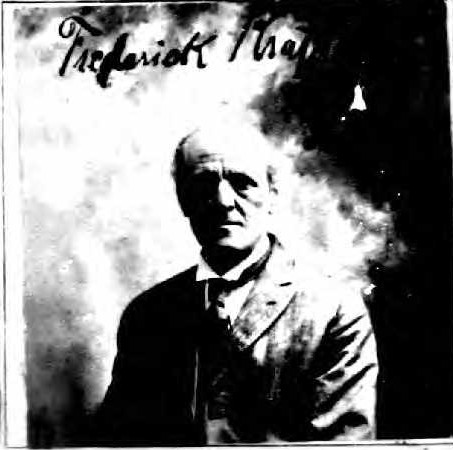
Frederick Krafft in 1921

Frederick Krafft (1860–August 31, 1933) was an American socialist political activist and politician. Twice nominated by the Socialist Party of America as its candidate for Governor of New Jersey and twice a candidate for United States Congress, Krafft is best remembered as the defendant in a 1918 trial for alleged violation of the Espionage Act. Krafft later was the only person convicted under this law to receive a full executive pardon from President Woodrow Wilson.

== Early years ==
Frederick Krafft was born in the United States in 1860. He was the son of German parents, radical republican "'48ers" who emigrated to America following the abortive German revolutions of 1848.

During his youth, Krafft studied to become a Christian minister, but the death of his father forced Frederick into the world of business, where he was employed by a life insurance company for 25 years. Krafft was subsequently the business manager for the New Yorker Volkszeitung, a German-language socialist daily newspaper located in New York City.

== Political career ==
A longtime resident of Ridgefield, Frederick Krafft was a State Secretary of the Socialist Party of New Jersey, the state affiliate of the Socialist Party of America (SPA). Krafft was a frequent delegate to conventions of the party, including the gatherings held in 1908, 1912, 1917, and 1919.

Krafft was elected to the governing 15 member National Executive Committee (NEC) of the SPA in 1918, although he was unable to participate in its activities until early the next year due to his ongoing legal difficulties.

During the bitter 1919 party split from which emerged the Communist Party of America and the Communist Labor Party of America, Krafft was one of the 7 supporters of the "Regular" faction headed by Executive Secretary Adolph Germer and NEC member James Oneal. Krafft was the NEC member who moved for the suspension of the Ohio state organization of the SPA in June 1919 owing to its support of the Left Wing Section headed by Alfred Wagenknecht and L.E. Katterfeld.

In 1920, Krafft was the nominee of the SPA for Congress in the 6th Congressional District of New Jersey. He ran again for the same seat in 1924, this time as the nominee of the Progressive Party headed by Robert M. La Follette, an umbrella organization with which the Socialist Party actively participated.

=== The 1918 trial ===
Krafft is best remembered as the defendant of one of the political trials associated with World War I.

In August 1917, Krafft was speaking on a street corner in Newark, New Jersey. At some point in his talk, soldiers in the crowd began to create a disturbance, causing Krafft to send for the police in an effort to maintain order. Instead of receiving police protection, Krafft was instead arrested for holding a meeting without a permit. These charges were later extended under the 1917 Espionage Act when a complaint was filed by soldiers in the crowd, who accused the socialist agitator of German extraction of attempting to cause insubordination and disloyalty in the armed forces.

During the course of the trial, the government called five witnesses, each of whom told varying accounts of the alleged disloyal speech which Krafft was charged with uttering. The most damning phrases seem to have been "I can't see how the government can compel troops to France" and "if it was up to me, I'd tell them to go to hell." Despite the fact that 12 witnesses were called by the defense to refute the allegation that such words were uttered, and despite Krafft's own protest that Krafft stated under oath that he had actually said very nearly the opposite, the jury returned a verdict of guilty.

Krafft was sentenced to 5 years in federal penitentiary and fined $1,000.

In March 1919, Krafft received a full pardon from President Woodrow Wilson for the 1918 conviction, owing in part to Krafft's pro-war stance at the 1917 Emergency National Convention of the Socialist Party.

== Death and legacy ==
Frederick Krafft died in August 1933 at his home in Ridgefield, New Jersey.

== See also ==
- List of people pardoned or granted clemency by the president of the United States

== Works ==
- Now and Then. New York: Socialistic Co-operative Publishing Association, 1901.
- "Shoot to Kill": A Labor Drama in One Act. New York: Co-operative Press, 1905.
- Let the Facts Speak for Themselves: Being a True Record of the Case of Frederick Krafft (Arrested while Speaking under Auspices of County Committee of the Socialist Party of Essex County). Newark, NJ: n.p., n.d. [c. 1917].
