= John Franklin Fort =

Governor of New Jersey (1852-1920)

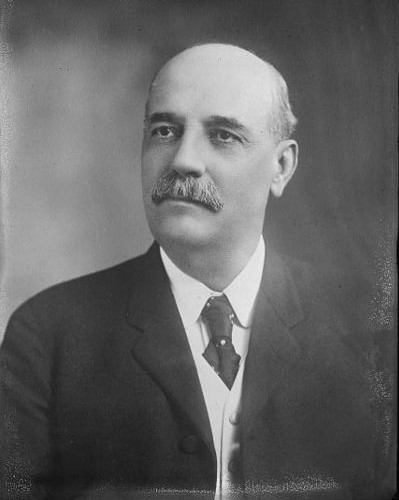

33rd Governor of New Jersey
- In office January 21, 1908 – January 17, 1911
- Preceded by: Edward C. Stokes
- Succeeded by: Woodrow Wilson

Personal details
- Born: March 20, 1852 Pemberton, New Jersey, U.S.
- Died: November 17, 1920 (aged 68) South Orange, New Jersey, U.S.
- Party: Republican
- Spouse: Charlotte E. Stainsby
- Education: Albany Law School (LL.B.)

John Franklin Fort (March 20, 1852 – November 17, 1920) was an American Republican Party politician, who served as the 33rd governor of New Jersey, from 1908 to 1911. His uncle, George Franklin Fort, was a Democratic governor of New Jersey from 1851 to 1854.

== Biography ==
Fort was born in Pemberton, New Jersey, on March 20, 1852. He attended the Pennington Seminary, and earned an LL.B. degree at Albany Law School in 1872.

An attorney, Fort was appointed by Governor George B. McClellan, a Democrat, to the First District Court of Newark, a position he held through subsequent Democratic administrations until he stepped down in 1886. Fort was a delegate to the Republican National Convention in 1884 and 1896. In 1900, Governor Foster M. Voorhees appointed him to the New Jersey Supreme Court, where he remained until 1907. Fort was a delegate to the 1912 Republican National Convention.

In 1909 Fort was elected an honorary member of the New Jersey Society of the Cincinnati.

In March 1917, President (and former New Jersey governor) Woodrow Wilson appointed Fort to the Federal Trade Commission, a position he held until November 1919 when he resigned due to illness. He died in his South Orange home on November 17, 1920, aged 68, and was buried at Bloomfield Cemetery in Bloomfield.

== See also ==
- List of governors of New Jersey

Political offices
Preceded by Edward C. Stokes	New Jersey governor January 21, 1908 – January 17, 1911	Succeeded by Woodrow Wilson
Preceded by David A. Depue	Associate Justice of the Supreme Court of New Jersey; 1900 – 1907	Succeeded by Charles Wolcott Parker
Party political offices
Preceded by Edward C. Stokes	Republican nominee for Governor of New Jersey; 1907	Succeeded by Vivian M. Lewis
