= John W. Slocum =

American lawyer and politician

John Webley Slocum (April 23, 1867 – May 22, 1938) was an American lawyer, politician, and judge from New Jersey.

== Life ==
Slocum was born on April 23, 1867, near Long Branch, New Jersey, the son of Edward Randolph Slocum and Mary Jane Woolley.

Slocum graduated from the Long Branch High School in 1884, after which he began studying law with Judge Wilbur A. Heisley. He was admitted to the state bar as an attorney in 1888, and in 1892 he was admitted as a counsellor-at-law. He maintained a general law practice in Long Branch. He was appointed a Special Master in Chancery by Chancellor William J. Magie with the recommendation of Henry Stafford Little. He was president of the Long Branch Daily Record, the Long Branch Sewer Company, and the Independent Fire Company, as well as director and counsel of the Hollywood Land Company. He was also president of the F. M. Taylor Publishing Company (which published the Long Branch Daily Record), vice-president and director of the Long Branch Trust Co., a member of the local board of education, and organizer and president of the West Long Branch Cemetery Trust. He served as Police Justice from 1889 to 1894 and City Solicitor from 1895 to 1900, at which point he resigned to focus on his law practice.

Slocum was a delegate to the 1912 Democratic National Convention. He was reappointed City Solicitor of Long Branch in 1906 and continued to hold that office when he was Senator. In 1911, he was elected to the New Jersey Senate as a Democrat, representing Monmouth County. He was the first Democratic Senator elected from Monmouth County in eighteen years. He served in the Senate in 1912, 1913, and 1914. He became President of the Senate in 1914, and in June of that year he served as Acting Governor when Governor James Fairman Fielder went on a western trip. After his term as Senator expired, Governor Fieldner appointed him Judge of the Monmouth County Common Pleas Court. He resigned from the court in May 1915 to accept an appointment to the Board of Public Utilities Commissioners. He became President of the Board in May 1918 following the resignation of Ralph W. E. Donges. He and the other three commissioners were removed from office by Governor Edward I. Edwards after a hearing in October 1920. The removals were sustained by the Supreme Court of New Jersey, and the commissioners brought the case before the New Jersey Court of Errors and Appeals.

Slocum was a trustee of the Monmouth County Bar Association and a member of the American Bar Association, the New Jersey State Bar Association, the Monmouth County Historical Society, and the Elks. He attended St. James Episcopal Church. In 1892, he married Ada Breece of Long Branch. They had no children.

Slocum died at home from a heart attack on May 22, 1938. He was buried in the Slocum family plot in the West Long Branch Cemetery.

Political offices
Preceded by James A. C. Johnson	President of the New Jersey Senate; 1914	Succeeded by Walter Evans Edge
