= Irvine I. Turner =

American politician (1914–1974)

Irvine Turner
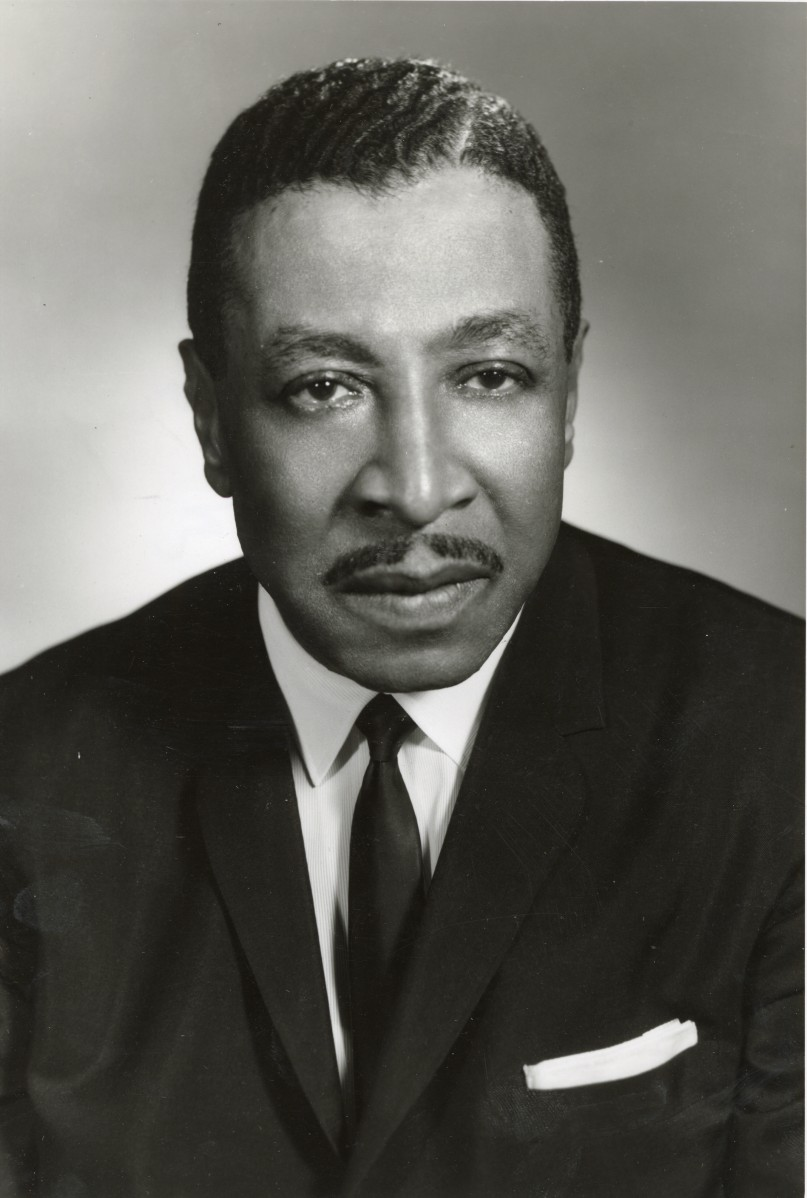

Member of the Municipal Council of Newark from the Central Ward
- In office July 1, 1954 – July 1, 1970
- Succeeded by: Dennis Westbrooks

Personal details
- Born: 1914 Newark, New Jersey, U.S.
- Died: September 9, 1974 Newark, New Jersey, U.S.
- Party: Democratic
- Occupation: Politician

Irvine I. Turner (1914–1974) was an American newspaper publisher and politician who was a native of Newark, New Jersey and served on the city's first Municipal Council. He was also publisher and co-editor of The New Jersey Record, a Black weekly newspaper. He was known for his "flamboyant personality and fiery rhetoric". Mayor Kenneth A. Gibson called him "a man who paved the way for black people to be elected to public office."

== Early life ==
Irvine Turner was born in Newark in 1914 and educated in the city, including at Barringer High School. He attended the New York School of Journalism and joined the staff of the New Jersey Guardian. When the Guardian suspended publication he co-founded The New Jersey Record with Fred R. Clark. In 1941 was appointed a member of the Newark Fair Employment Practices Committee under Mayor Vincent J. Murphy, becoming its youngest member. In the same year he served on a committee to study one way streets under Public Safety Director John B Keenan. Turner ran unsuccessfully for City Commissioner in 1949 and 1953.

== Newark Municipal Council ==
=== 1954 election ===
In November 1953, Newark voters adopted a new charter via public referendum. The charter abolished the existing five-member city commission and replaced it with a nine-member Municipal Council, with four members elected at-large and five elected from the city's five new wards. Elections to four-year terms on the Municipal Council were scheduled for May 11, 1954, and the new Council would take office on the following July 1.

Turner ran to represent the Central Ward against Roger Yancy, a lawyer advanced by the professional African American community, and Johnny Savado. Turner, as a newspaperman, was popular in the community. He had financial support from Jewish gangster Abner Zwillman and was endorsed by former mayor Ralph A. Villani, unions, the Civil Rights Congress, and the Negro Labor Vanguard. The New Jersey Afro American, however, endorsed Yancey.

In the initial election, Turner and Savado advanced to a run-off. Turner defeated Savado by approximately one thousand votes in a run-off election.

Historian Robert Curvin wrote, "With his victory, a common man with intriguing connections and one-time neighborhood hustler was transformed into one of the most important politicians in New Jersey." Amiri Baraka wrote, "Mr. Turner's breakthrough into American politics was made possible by getting into political shape the Black Central Ward and establishing a leadership category for Black People going for the Democratic Party."

=== Tenure ===
He was re-elected repeatedly. During his career, Turner aligned with mayors Meyer C. Ellenstein and Ralph A. Villani. He helped appoint African Americans for Newark city positions, using these jobs in exchange for the support of voters which he could then provide to other politicians including Hugh Joseph Addonizio. He pushed for more opportunities for African Americans in employment, housing, the police force and government. He had a wide-ranging career and was involved with many issues in the Central Ward and citywide. He criticized the white establishment including slumlords and officials.

During his career he was featured in national magazines like Jet and Ebony.

However, by the later 1960s, many in Newark were looking for radical change. Kenneth A. Gibson, with the support of Amiri Baraka, challenged Addonizio in the mayoral election under the banner of the United Freedom Democratic Party. George C. Richardson ran against Turner on the Gibson ticket but received only 10,000 votes. In 1967, Baraka continued his criticisms of Turner, writing, "Where once [Turner] offered some actual inspiration to Black People in Newark, now he represents the impotence and incompetence of one traditional area of Negro leadership."

As new organizers began to present a challenge to established politicians, Turner began criticizing the civil rights activists in Newark. He said, "Violence, rash words, or insulting remarks are not going to get my race any further ahead than they have come.”

=== Indictment and defeat ===
In December 1969, Turner was indicted along with Mayor Hugh Joseph Addonizio. In 1970, with opposition against Addonizio growing, Dennis Westbrooks challenged Turner and won a runoff. Gibson defeated Addonizio for mayor, but Westbrooks was one of only two Gibson allies to win election to the Council.

== Personal life and death ==
Irvine Turner had been hospitalized on numerous occasions since the 1950s and sustained numerous strokes. He died on September 9, 1974, leaving a wife and three children.

=== Legacy ===
Irvine I. Turner Boulevard, a large street in Newark, is named after him.
