= 1943 New Jersey gubernatorial election =

- November 2, 1943
- Turnout: 54.99% (▼30.53%)
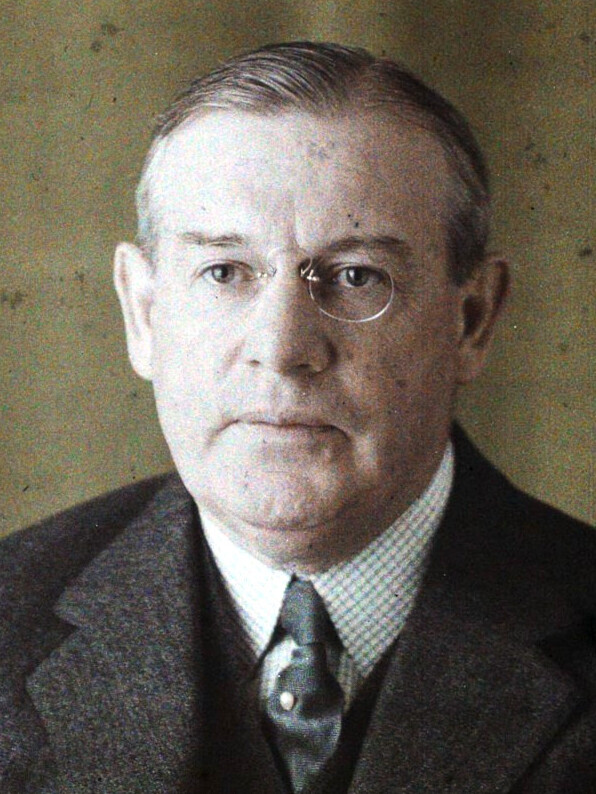

| Nominee | Walter E. Edge | Vincent J. Murphy |
| Party | Republican | Democratic |
| Popular vote | 634,364 | 506,604 |
| Percentage | 55.20% | 44.08% |
- County results Edge: 50–60% 60–70% 70–80% Murphy: 50–60% 70–80%
Governor before election
Charles Edison
Democratic
Elected Governor
Walter Evans Edge
Republican

The 1943 New Jersey gubernatorial election was held on November 2, 1943. Republican nominee Walter Evans Edge defeated Democratic mayor of Newark Vincent J. Murphy of the vote. The election, held at the height of American involvement in World War II, returned Edge, who had previously governed the state during World War I, to the office after nearly 35 years.

Primary elections were held on September 21, 1943. Both Edge and Murphy were unopposed for their respective party nominations. Murphy was nominated with the support of the Jersey City political machine led by Frank Hague.

== Republican primary ==
=== Candidates ===
- Walter E. Edge, newspaper publisher and former governor (1916–19) and U.S. senator (1919–29)

=== Campaign ===
Walter Edge was recruited to run by Republican Party leadership. Edge, who had served as governor from 1916 to 1919 during World War I, had been a popular leader and was elected to two terms in the United States Senate before serving as United States Ambassador to France. He announced his candidacy on April 30, 1943. He was immediately endorsed by good government activists, led by Arthur T. Vanderbilt and U.S. senator Albert W. Hawkes. Although Edge declined to present a detailed platform, he endorsed Charles Edison's ongoing efforts at constitutional reform and denounced any potential deal with the Democratic Party.

=== Results ===
Republican primary results
| Party | Candidate | Votes | % |
|---|---|---|---|
| Republican | Walter Evans Edge | 227,253 | 100.00 |
| Total votes | | 227,253 | 84.21% |
| Invalid or blank votes | | 1,367 | 0.51% |
| Blank ballots | | 41,252 | 15.29% |
| Turnout | | 269,872 | |

== Democratic primary ==
=== Candidates ===
- Vincent J. Murphy, mayor of Newark since 1941 and president of the New Jersey Federation of Labor

==== Declined ====
- A. Harry Moore, former governor (1926–29, 1932–35, and 1938–41) and U.S. senator (1935–38)

=== Campaign ===
Murphy, a long-time labor organizer and the mayor of Newark, was chosen in July as a consensus candidate who could unify a party divided between supporters and opponents of the Frank Hague machine in Jersey City, including New Deal loyalists who favored national progressive policies over the pragmatic patronage approach taken by Hague. Murphy had been elected city commissioner in 1937 and mayor in 1941 with Hague's support against incumbent Meyer C. Ellenstein.

Hague was able to gain incumbent governor Edison's support for Murphy after Hague was unable to persuade his strongest ally, former three-term governor A. Harry Moore, to run. Edison and Hague each independently endorsed Murphy, eliminating the potential for a divisive primary campaign.

=== Results ===
Democratic Party primary results
| Party | Candidate | Votes | % |
|---|---|---|---|
| Democratic | Vincent J. Murphy | 170,385 | 100.00% |
| Total votes | | 170,385 | 92.57% |
| Invalid or blank votes | | 1,050 | 0.57% |
| Blank ballots | | 12,626 | 6.86% |
| Turnout | | 184,061 | |

== General election ==
=== Candidates ===
- John Binns (Prohibition)
- John C. Butterworth (Socialist Labor)
- Walter Evans Edge, newspaper publisher and former governor (1916–19) and U.S. senator (1919–29) (Republican)
- Vincent J. Murphy, mayor of Newark since 1941 and president of the New Jersey Federation of Labor (Democratic)
- Roy V. H. Wilkinson (Socialist)

=== Campaign ===
Because neither major candidate faced significant primary opposition, they focused early on contrasting their positions on the issues. Edge focused on his support for constitutional reform and administrative efficiency, opposing any proposal for a state income tax and promising to balance the state budget despite wartime expenditures. Murphy campaigned on greater protection for laborers, particularly safeguarding against exploitation in the industrial sector as a result of the war, and on establishing a framework for post-war economic equity. Edge argued that Murphy's policies would require tax increases to fund expanded social programs, particularly as wartime labor disputes had led to increased reliance on public assistance, and that labor rights should be secondary to the industrial focus necessary to win the war.

Although Edge had been supported by Hague during his first gubernatorial campaign in 1916, he attacked Murphy for his association with the party boss.

Late in the campaign, Murphy sought to make the war an issue in his favor. He accused Edge of using state national guard units during World War I to promote his political career, citing contemporary press reports. Edge denied the allegation. Murphy also accused Edge of isolationism in his opposition to 1940 Republican nominee Wendell Willkie, a charge which was denied by Willkie himself. There were no debates between the two candidates; the campaigns relied instead on endorsements and traditional regional organizing.

=== Results ===
New Jersey gubernatorial election, 1943
| Party | Candidate | Votes | % | ±% |
|---|---|---|---|---|
| Republican | Walter Evans Edge | 634,364 | 55.20% | |
| Democratic | Vincent J. Murphy | 506,604 | 44.08% | |
| Socialist Labor | John C. Butterworth | 4,587 | 0.40% | |
| Prohibition | John Binns | 2,074 | 0.18% | |
| Socialist | Roy V. H. Wilkinson | 1,563 | 0.14% | |
| Majority | | | | |
| Turnout | | | | |
| Republican gain from Democratic | | Swing | | |

In addition to Edge's large victory in the gubernatorial election, voters decisively approved a referendum in favor of constitutional revision, authorizing the state legislature to draft and agree upon a revised constitution with no modifications to the state bill of rights or legislative apportionment.
