= TWA Flight 1 =

1936 aircraft crash in Pennsylvania, US

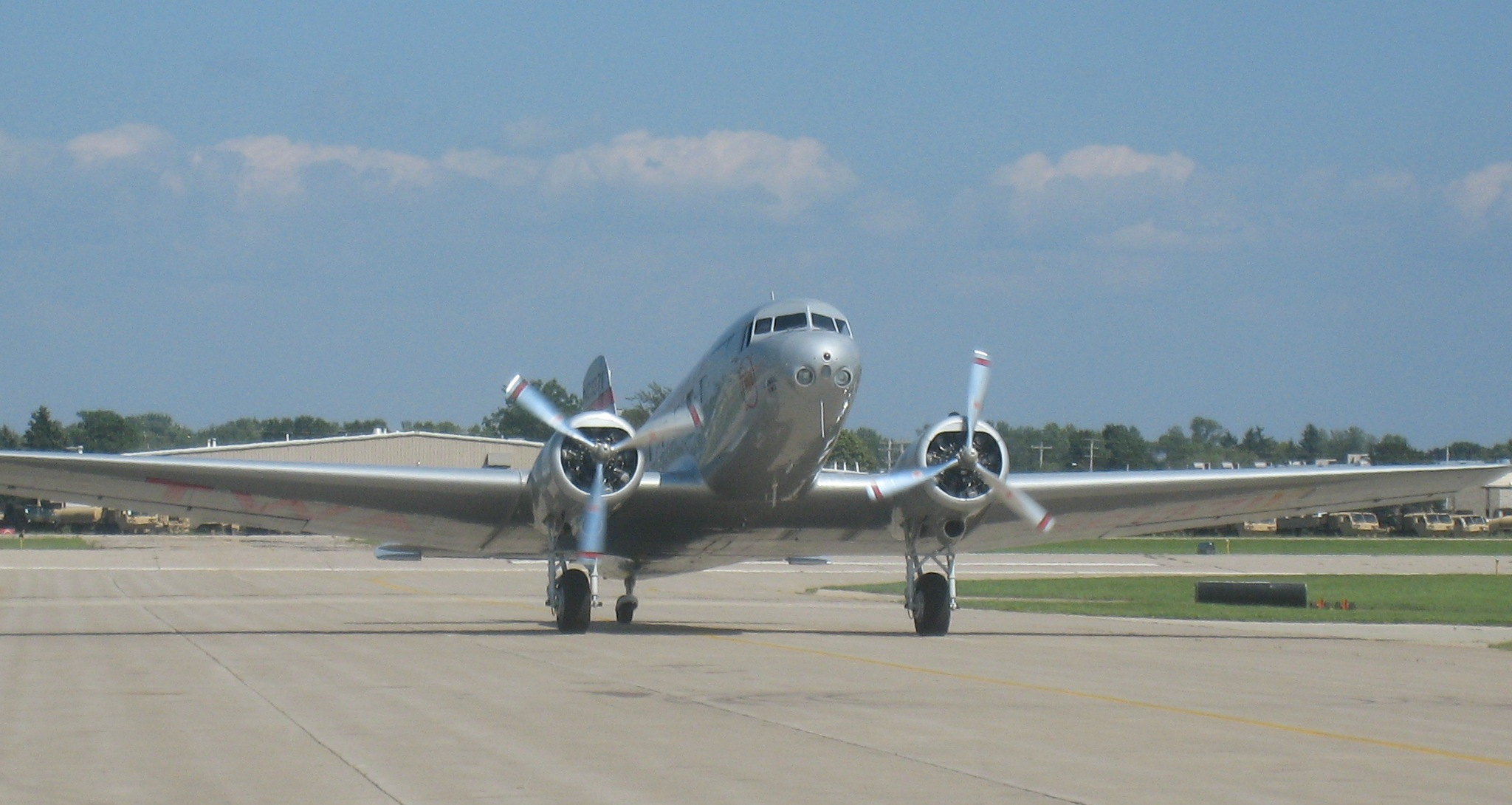
- A restored DC-2 is seen with TWA markings

Accident
- Date: April 7, 1936
- Summary: Pilot error
- Site: Chestnut Ridge, Wharton Township, Fayette County, near Uniontown, Pennsylvania; 39°47′59.10″N 79°41′56.58″W

Aircraft
- Aircraft type: Douglas DC-2
- Operator: Transcontinental and Western Airways (TWA)
- Registration: NC13721
- Flight origin: Newark, New Jersey
- Stopover: Camden, New Jersey, Pittsburgh, Pennsylvania, Columbus, Ohio, Dayton, Ohio, Indianapolis, Indiana, Milwaukee, Wisconsin, St. Louis, Missouri, Kansas City, Missouri, Topeka, Kansas, Amarillo, Texas, and Albuquerque, New Mexico
- Destination: Los Angeles
- Passengers: 11
- Crew: 3
- Fatalities: 12
- Injuries: 2
- Survivors: 2

Transcontinental and Western Airways Flight 1 (TWA 1), a Douglas DC-2, crashed into Chestnut Ridge, near Uniontown, Pennsylvania, approximately 10:20 a.m. Eastern Standard Time on April 7, 1936, killing 12 of the 14 passengers and crew aboard. Flight 1 was a regularly scheduled TWA Sun Racer flight from Newark, New Jersey, to Los Angeles, with almost a dozen intermediate stops between. Approaching the flight's second stop, Pittsburgh, Pennsylvania's Allegheny County Airport, pilot Otto Ferguson lost contact with the airport's radio navigation signal, and tracked several miles in a southwestern line off course. Fearing icing conditions, he descended in an attempt to find visual landmarks for navigation. Thick fog hindered him, and his descent continued until Flight 1 hit ice-covered trees atop Chestnut Ridge, about 40 miles (64 km) south of Pittsburgh, just north of the West Virginia state line and near Uniontown, Pennsylvania. When the plane crashed it was aiming in a northern flight direction indicating that the pilot finally realized he had tracked south of his flightplan and may have been trying to correct it. (The flight should have been aimed due west not north or hours prior south-southwest.)

The plane's two pilots were killed instantly, as were several passengers. Flight attendant Nellie Granger, though injured in the crash, got help for the surviving passengers by following nearby telephone wires to a home, where she called for help. Though one of the survivors later died of his injuries, Granger was hailed as a hero for her efforts to help them despite her own injuries.

== The Sun Racer ==
Transcontinental & Western Airways, forerunner to the modern Trans World Airlines, formed July 16, 1930, from the merger of Transcontinental Air Transport (T-A-T) and Western Air Express. In October 1930, T&WA pioneered the first U.S. transcontinental scheduled service, a 36-hour affair that included an overnight stay in Kansas City, Missouri. As the airline became more experienced with long-distance flying, its service improved. In 1934, it introduced the Douglas DC-1, flying it coast to coast in February 1934 in a then-record 12 hours, 4 minutes.

On May 18, 1934, the DC-2, the production version of the DC-1, entered commercial service on TWA's Columbus–Pittsburgh–Newark route. The aircraft's success quickly led to its introduction on most TWA routes, and the growth of others. The most prominent of these was the Sun Racer, also known as TWA Flight 1, which promised to deliver passengers from coast to coast in a single day.

== The crash ==
On March 11, 1936, W. L. Smith, a pilot for TWA, was descending to land at Pittsburgh's Allegheny County Airport but found the airport's radio beacon had led him 40 miles (64 km) off course. After landing safely, Smith complained to airport officials, who were unable to find anything wrong with the beacon. Other pilots later testified the beacon frequently gave a false signal similar to the one received when an airplane was directly above the airport.

On April 7, TWA Flight 1 left Newark at 7:54 a.m. and made its regularly scheduled stop in Camden, outside Philadelphia, at 8:27 a.m. and picked up additional passengers. In Camden, pilot Otto Ferguson and co-pilot Harry C. Lewis received the weather report for their trip, which indicated heavy clouds and icing conditions in western Pennsylvania below 15,000 feet. The DC-2 was certified to operate in these conditions, which required instrument flying rules. Ferguson's plan was to fly west from Camden, using compass readings and radio beacons as guidance, then make an approach into Allegheny County Airport from the northeast. During the trip, he kept in radio contact with TWA Flight 21, a direct flight from Newark to Pittsburgh. That flight was scheduled to arrive about the same time as Flight 1, and Ferguson wanted to avoid potential problems.

Unbeknownst to Ferguson, the course he flew was about 8 degrees south of his plan. After passing the Harrisburg, Pennsylvania, radio beam, TWA Flight 1 began to drift south. Heavy cloud cover prevented Ferguson from seeing any landmarks, and he was relying wholly upon instruments. Shortly after 10 a.m., Ferguson began his descent to Pittsburgh, believing it to be much closer than it actually was. At 10:09, he asked for weather conditions and was told the skies were overcast, with thick clouds above 1,700 feet (520 m). He confirmed the report and said he was about 10 miles (16 km) east of the airport, flying in clouds at 3,000 feet (910 m). Ferguson said the tower's radio signal was "very weak" and asked, "Is it OK to come on in?" It was the last communication from the plane.

At 10:10 a.m., witnesses near Connellsville, Pennsylvania, which is about 30 miles (48 km) south of Pittsburgh, reported hearing and seeing the plane fly overhead through gaps in the fog. Several people reported seeing the plane flying low over houses. Investigators later concluded that during these final moments before the crash, Ferguson realized he was lost and began following a small creek to the northwest. The heavy clouds forced him to fly lower to follow the creek, which turns into a small valley before its source. After entering the valley, Ferguson would have had only three-quarters of a mile (1.5 kilometers) to climb 650 feet (200 m) over the mountain he was then faced with.

About 10:20 a.m., Flight 1 crashed into the south side of Chestnut Ridge's summit.

== Rescue ==
For those aboard, the first inkling that something was wrong came when the first trees flew by the passenger cabin's windows. Until that point, the flight had been an uneventful one, with few bumps. The seatbelt warning light had not been lit. Pilot Ferguson and co-pilot Lewis were killed instantly upon impact, their bodies trapped within the wreckage. A handful of passengers were more fortunate, as they were thrown from the aircraft as it tore itself apart, then flipped over and began burning. Flight attendant Nellie Granger was the first of these passengers to realize what had happened.

She remembered nothing of the crash itself and awoke about 125 feet (38 m) from the plane's wreckage. Though stunned by the concussion and bleeding from several injuries, she managed to pull two passengers away from the burning aircraft and administered first aid. Realizing they needed immediate medical attention, she went to find help. Despite the thick fog, clouds and freezing rain that dominated the scene, she noticed a set of telephone wires in a nearby field. Wearing only a light uniform, she followed the wires 4 miles (6.4 km) to a farmhouse, where she telephoned the TWA office in Pittsburgh to notify them of the crash.

In Pittsburgh, Flight 21, which had been ahead of Flight 1, arrived at 10:33 without incident. The Allegheny County Airport air traffic controller began radioing in vain for news of Flight 1, but received no news. Not until Granger's phone call about 1:55 p.m. did anyone at the airfield realize the plane had crashed. Help was immediately dispatched to the area, and Granger retraced her steps to the crash site, where she greeted rescuers before being escorted to an ambulance and a hospital in Uniontown.

== Casualties ==
Of the 14 people—nine passengers and three crew—aboard the aircraft, three people survived the crash, but one of those later died of infection. A flight attendant was the sole crewmember to live, while the wife of Meyer Ellenstein, the mayor of Newark, was the sole survivor among the passengers. One passenger died a week after the accident when a series of amputations failed to stop the advance of an infection. Early reports indicated more of the passengers survived, leading to tragedy when friends rushed to the crash, only to be informed of the truth. Four of the dead passengers were students at Valley Forge Military Academy and were on Easter vacation from classes, enjoying their first airplane trip. The pilot, Otto Ferguson, died on his 42nd birthday; a party had been planned at Indianapolis, one of the stops on the flight's path to Los Angeles.

== Investigation ==
Even before the survivors had been rushed to the hospital, investigators had begun to determine the reason for the crash. The Bureau of Air Commerce, predecessor to the modern Federal Aviation Administration, was put in charge of the investigation, but TWA sent independent investigators as well. Bad weather was pointed to as an early suspect, and TWA backed the idea that a faulty radio beacon was to blame, resuming an argument that had begun in February, when TWA's president testified to the U.S. Congress that airplane radio beacons were being poorly maintained.

At the crash scene, investigators measured the plane's slide and found the DC-2 had cut a swath more than 200 feet (61 m) long, indicating the plane had been going at a fast pace rather than a landing speed. Interviews with Nellie Granger established the plane had not been readied for landing, indicating pilot Ferguson did not believe he was in a final descent. Government tests revealed the landing beam was not faulty, but TWA refused to accept those results and was persuaded only when independent testing confirmed the results.

Major R. W. Schroeder of the Department of Commerce said, "In my opinion the cause of this catastrophe will never be known," but investigators gradually uncovered the truth through interviews with people who had seen the plane's course diverge from schedule. In the end, the Bureau of Air Commerce concluded pilot Ferguson was at fault and demonstrated "poor judgment" by descending to a dangerous altitude in an attempt to navigate visually. By the time he realized his mistake, ice buildup on the plane's wings prevented it from gaining enough altitude to avoid the mountain. TWA disagreed with the report's conclusions but did not offer an alternative explanation.

== Aftermath ==
In 1935, the Bureau of Air Commerce encouraged a group of airlines to establish the first three centers for providing air traffic control along the airways. Following the crash, the Bureau itself took over the centers and began to expand the network, leading to the development of the modern air traffic control system.

For her efforts, flight attendant Nellie Granger from nearby Dravosburg, Pennsylvania was acclaimed as a hero. She was profiled by The New York Times and Time Magazine, and TWA promoted her to the top position among its flight attendants. She continued flying on the Sky Chief, another TWA New York-Los Angeles flight, albeit after a seagoing cruise paid for by TWA. Country music singer Joe Barker was inspired by her story to write the song "The Crash of The Sun Racer", which tells the story in verse:

"Her flight was made on schedule till she reached the mountain tall. / It's just 12 miles from Uniontown the ship began to fall. / Our praise goes to the stewardess who spread the news around / And tried to help the passengers as the ship blazed on the ground."

TWA continued to use the "Sun Racer" name and flight number throughout the late 1930s. In 2002, a 475-pound granite monument was erected on the crash site to memorialize those killed in the accident.

== Popular culture ==
Country singer and musician "Happy Go-Lucky" Joe Barker created a song memorializing the disaster entitled "The Crash of The Sun Racer."
