= Ocean port =

Ocean port could refer to:

- Oceanport, New Jersey
- A port on an ocean coastline
  - also known as access to tidewater
