= Driscoll Expressway =

Unbuilt highway in New Jersey

Route information
- Maintained by NJTA
- Length: 38 mi (61 km)

Major junctions
- South end: G.S. Parkway / US 9 in Toms River
- I-195 in Jackson Township
- North end: I-95 / N.J. Turnpike in South Brunswick Township

Location
- Country: United States
- State: New Jersey
- Counties: Ocean, Monmouth, Middlesex

Highway system
- New Jersey State Highway Routes; Interstate; US; State; Scenic Byways

The Driscoll Expressway was a proposed 38-mile-long (61 km) tolled limited-access highway that would have connected the New Jersey Turnpike with the Garden State Parkway in the U.S. state of New Jersey. The road was proposed in 1971 to alleviate traffic in the area and was named for former Governor Alfred E. Driscoll, who as chairman of the New Jersey Turnpike Authority (NJTA) would push for construction of the road. By the mid-1970s, mounting opposition from area residents and Governor Brendan Byrne led to the cancellation of the road.

== Route description ==
The Driscoll Expressway, if it had been built, would have begun at an interchange with the Garden State Parkway near County Route 530 in Berkeley Township, Ocean County. From here, it would continue northwest through Ocean County, passing through Toms River Township (formerly Dover Township), Lakewood, and Jackson Township. The highway was to continue into Monmouth County and head northwest through Freehold Township and Manalapan Township. The Driscoll Expressway would cross into Middlesex County and pass through Old Bridge Township (formerly Madison Township), Monroe Township, Helmetta, and East Brunswick Township before heading into South Brunswick and ending at the New Jersey Turnpike.

The Driscoll Expressway was to be four lanes wide. The proposed highway was to have 12-foot-wide (3.7 m) lanes and shoulders as well as a wide median with preserved vegetation and a 450-foot-wide (140 m) right-of-way area of preserved open space. Engineers decided that the speed limit would have been posted at 60 mph (97 km/h), as opposed to 70 mph (110 km/h) for extra safety. The southern half of the highway would have run through the Pinelands Preserve, an area of sandy soil that prevents most plant species other than pines to grow, hence the name.

== History ==
The highway was originally envisioned as the 45-mile-long (72 km) Garden State Thruway by the New Jersey Highway Authority. However, in the mid 1970s, the plans were scratched. The New Jersey Turnpike Authority then stepped in, drawing up plans for a proposed 36-mile-long (58 km) highway. The route would have provided a route to Southern New Jersey for trucks coming from the Trenton area. The highway was now scheduled for completion in 1976. The proposed highway, originally called the Toms River Expressway, was designated in 1971 for former Governor Alfred E. Driscoll. Driscoll would be named the chairman of the New Jersey Turnpike Authority the same year by Governor William T. Cahill and would be responsible for the planning and construction of the road. The Driscoll Expressway was proposed in order to relieve traffic on U.S. Route 9 at a time when Ocean County was experiencing rapid population growth. The highway was projected to have an annual average daily traffic count of 92,000 vehicles by 1990. The Driscoll Expressway was projected to cost $350 million.

In 1973, Brendan Byrne was elected Governor of New Jersey, and he would be in opposition to the proposed highway. Byrne would sign legislation to protect the Pine Barrens from development. Driscoll fought Byrne in an effort to have the road constructed. A total of 90 houses would need to be demolished to construct the highway, and opposition mounted from residents who would lose their houses. Also, voters turned down a $650 million issue for transportation issues. Byrne tried to kill the proposal because of the negative environmental impact it would have. The Authority did not listen, but when Byrne saw that Turnpike tolls would rise by more than 80%, he became more determined. Opposition increased in Ocean County out of fear that the highway would increase traffic and development. In June 1974, construction of the road was blocked by a three-judge Appellate Court. Driscoll died in March 1975 and a week later, the New Jersey Turnpike Authority shelved plans for the road. In February 1977, the New Jersey Turnpike Authority dropped plans for the highway. Hopes to revive the highway failed and the New Jersey Turnpike Authority began to sell off the rights-of-way in the late 1980s.

== Exit list ==
| County | Location | mi | km | Exit | Destinations | Notes |
|---|---|---|---|---|---|---|
| Ocean | Toms River | | | D1 | G.S. Parkway / US 9 | Proposed southern terminus |
| Ocean | Toms River | | | D2 | Route 37 | |
| Ocean | Lakehurst | | | D3 | Route 70 | Planned toll plaza |
| Ocean | Jackson Township | | | D4 | I-195 | Planned toll plaza |
| Monmouth | Manalapan Township | | | D5 | Route 33 | Planned toll plaza |
| Middlesex | Old Bridge Township | | | D6 | CR 520 | Planned toll plaza |
| Middlesex | South Brunswick Township | | | D7 | N.J. Turnpike / I-95 | Proposed northern terminus |
1.000 mi = 1.609 km; 1.000 km = 0.621 mi
