= Chestnut Ridge =

Chestnut Ridge may refer to:

- Chestnut Ridge, Bedford County, a mountain ridge in Pennsylvania
- Chestnut Ridge, Indiana, an unincorporated community in Jackson County
- Chestnutridge, Missouri, an unincorporated community in Christian County
- Chestnut Ridge, Missouri, an unincorporated community in Ste. Genevieve County
- Chestnut Ridge, New Jersey, an unincorporated community in Bergen County
- Chestnut Ridge, New York, a village in the town of Ramapo
- Chestnut Ridge, West Virginia, an unincorporated community in Monongalia County
- Chestnut Ridge Park, in Orchard Park, New York
- Chestnut Ridge people, a Melungeon community residing near Philippi, West Virginia
- Chestnut Ridge (Laurel Highlands), in the Laurel Highlands of southwestern Pennsylvania
- Chestnut Ridge (Aberdeen, Maryland), a home on the National Register of Historic Places
