= Oceanport, New Jersey =

Borough in Monmouth County, New Jersey, US

- Borough
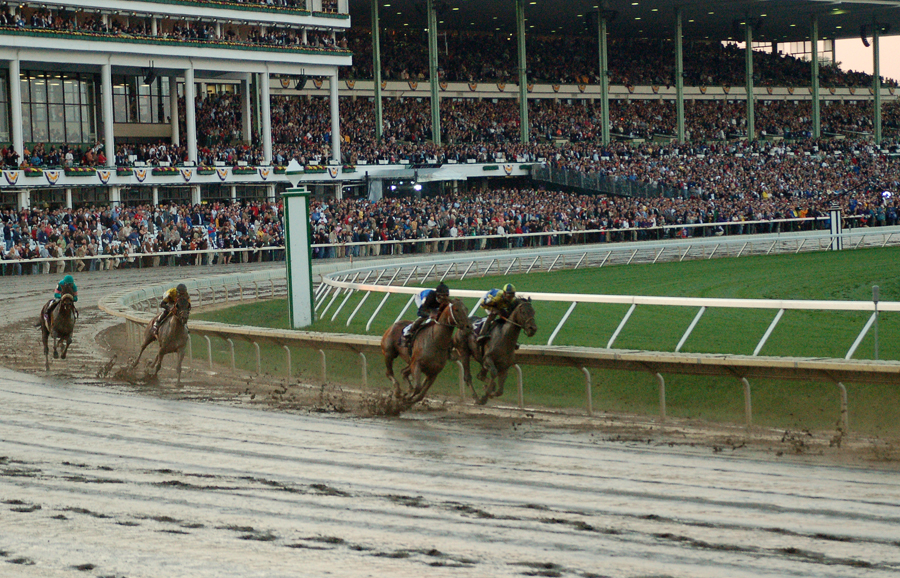
- Thoroughbred horse racing at Monmouth Park Racetrack in Oceanport

- Seal

- Map of Oceanport in Monmouth County. Inset: Location of Monmouth County highlighted in the State of New Jersey.

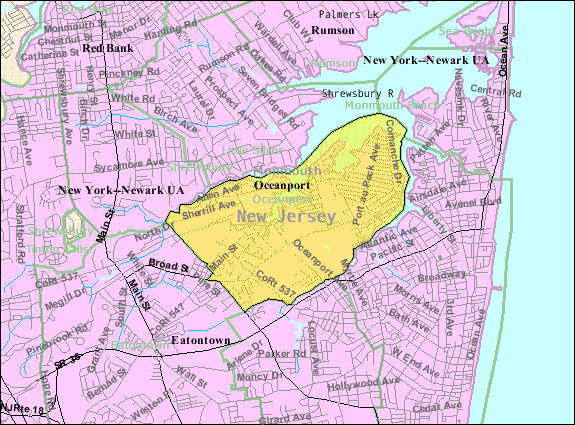
- Census Bureau map of Oceanport, New Jersey

- Location in Monmouth County Location in New Jersey Location in the United States
- Coordinates: 40°18′58″N 74°01′14″W
- Country: United States
- State: New Jersey
- County: Monmouth
- Incorporated: May 11, 1920

Government
  - Type: Borough
  - Body: Borough Council
  - Mayor: Thomas J. Tvrdik (R, term ends December 31, 2027)
  - Municipal clerk: Jeanne Smith

Area
  - Total: 3.80 sq mi (9.83 km^{2})
  - Land: 3.17 sq mi (8.22 km^{2})
  - Water: 0.62 sq mi (1.61 km^{2}) 16.39%
  - Rank: 305th of 565 in state 21st of 53 in county
- Elevation: 20 ft (6.1 m)

Population (2020)
  - Total: 6,150
  - Estimate (2024): 6,383
  - Rank: 342nd of 565 in state 27th of 53 in county
  - Density: 1,938.8/sq mi (748.6/km^{2})
  - Rank: 297th of 565 in state 36th of 53 in county
- Time zone: UTC−05:00 (Eastern (EST))
  - Summer (DST): UTC−04:00 (Eastern (EDT))
- ZIP Code: 07757
- Area codes: 732, 848
- FIPS code: 3402554570
- GNIS feature ID: 885334
- Website: www.oceanportboro.com

Oceanport is a borough situated in the Jersey Shore region, within Monmouth County, in the U.S. state of New Jersey, specifically Central Jersey. As of the 2020 United States census, the borough's population was 6,150, an increase of 318 (+5.5%) from the 2010 census count of 5,832, which in turn reflected an increase of 25 (+0.4%) from the 5,807 counted in the 2000 census.

Oceanport was formed as a borough by an act of the New Jersey Legislature on April 6, 1920, from portions of Eatontown Township (now Eatontown), based on the results of a referendum held on May 11, 1920.

New Jersey Monthly magazine ranked Oceanport as its 4th best place to live in its 2008 rankings of the "Best Places To Live" in New Jersey.

== Geography ==
According to the United States Census Bureau, borough had a total area of 3.80 square miles (9.83 km^{2}), including 3.17 square miles (8.22 km^{2}) of land and 0.62 square miles (1.61 km^{2}) of water (16.39%).

The borough borders the Monmouth County municipalities of Little Silver and Shrewsbury to the northwest, Long Branch to the east, Eatontown to the southwest and West Long Branch to the southeast. It shares water borders to the northeast with Monmouth Beach and Rumson and forms a peninsula, jutting into the Shrewsbury River.

Unincorporated communities, localities and place names within the borough include Elkwood Park, Fort Monmouth, Gooseneck Point, Port-au-peck and Sands Point.

== Demographics ==
Historical population
Census	Pop.	Note	%±
1930	1,872		—
1940	3,159		68.8%
1950	7,588		140.2%
1960	4,937		−34.9%
1970	7,503		52.0%
1980	5,888		−21.5%
1990	6,146		4.4%
2000	5,807		−5.5%
2010	5,832		0.4%
2020	6,150		5.5%
2024 (est.)	6,383	▲	3.8%
Population sources:1930 1940–2000 2000; 2010 2020

=== 2020 census ===
As of the 2020 census, Oceanport had a population of 6,150. The median age was 46.0 years. 19.9% of residents were under the age of 18 and 20.6% of residents were 65 years of age or older. For every 100 females there were 99.8 males, and for every 100 females age 18 and over there were 97.2 males age 18 and over.

100.0% of residents lived in urban areas, while 0.0% lived in rural areas.

There were 2,346 households in Oceanport, of which 28.6% had children under the age of 18 living in them. Of all households, 56.2% were married-couple households, 15.0% were households with a male householder and no spouse or partner present, and 24.8% were households with a female householder and no spouse or partner present. About 24.5% of all households were made up of individuals and 13.7% had someone living alone who was 65 years of age or older.

There were 2,469 housing units, of which 5.0% were vacant. The homeowner vacancy rate was 1.0% and the rental vacancy rate was 6.1%.

Racial composition as of the 2020 census
Race	Number	Percent
White	5,265	85.6%
Black or African American	98	1.6%
American Indian and Alaska Native	9	0.1%
Asian	70	1.1%
Native Hawaiian and Other Pacific Islander	1	0.0%
Some other race	405	6.6%
Two or more races	302	4.9%
Hispanic or Latino (of any race)	611	9.9%

=== 2010 census ===
The 2010 United States census counted 5,832 people, 2,227 households, and 1,597 families in the borough. The population density was 1,833.7 per square mile (708.0/km^{2}). There were 2,390 housing units at an average density of 751.5 per square mile (290.2/km^{2}). The racial makeup was 93.36% (5,445) White, 3.00% (175) Black or African American, 0.05% (3) Native American, 1.59% (93) Asian, 0.00% (0) Pacific Islander, 0.67% (39) from other races, and 1.32% (77) from two or more races. Hispanic or Latino of any race were 4.05% (236) of the population.

Of the 2,227 households, 31.8% had children under the age of 18; 59.7% were married couples living together; 9.1% had a female householder with no husband present and 28.3% were non-families. Of all households, 24.6% were made up of individuals and 12.1% had someone living alone who was 65 years of age or older. The average household size was 2.59 and the average family size was 3.12.

23.4% of the population were under the age of 18, 6.7% from 18 to 24, 21.0% from 25 to 44, 32.8% from 45 to 64, and 16.1% who were 65 years of age or older. The median age was 44.4 years. For every 100 females, the population had 96.6 males. For every 100 females ages 18 and older there were 93.5 males.

The Census Bureau's 2006–2010 American Community Survey showed that (in 2010 inflation-adjusted dollars) median household income was $89,208 (with a margin of error of +/− $18,245) and the median family income was $108,958 (+/− $21,795). Males had a median income of $60,038 (+/− $12,383) versus $49,415 (+/− $5,095) for females. The per capita income for the borough was $52,252 (+/− $9,172). About 3.1% of families and 4.2% of the population were below the poverty line, including 10.2% of those under age 18 and 2.5% of those age 65 or over.

=== 2000 census ===
As of the 2000 United States census there were 5,807 people, 2,043 households, and 1,554 families residing in the borough. The population density was 1,802.1 inhabitants per square mile (695.8/km^{2}). There were 2,114 housing units at an average density of 656.0 per square mile (253.3/km^{2}). The racial makeup of the borough was 95.71% White, 1.96% African American, 0.07% Native American, 0.79% Asian, 0.02% Pacific Islander, 0.55% from other races, and 0.90% from two or more races. Hispanic or Latino of any race were 2.07% of the population.

There were 2,043 households, out of which 35.2% had children under the age of 18 living with them, 66.0% were married couples living together, 8.4% had a female householder with no husband present, and 23.9% were non-families. 21.7% of all households were made up of individuals, and 10.7% had someone living alone who was 65 years of age or older. The average household size was 2.71 and the average family size was 3.18.

In the borough the population was spread out, with 24.5% under the age of 18, 8.4% from 18 to 24, 25.5% from 25 to 44, 27.4% from 45 to 64, and 14.2% who were 65 years of age or older. The median age was 40 years. For every 100 females, there were 98.1 males. For every 100 females age 18 and over, there were 96.0 males.

The median income for a household in the borough was $71,458, and the median income for a family was $85,038. Males had a median income of $57,955 versus $39,718 for females. The per capita income for the borough was $33,356. About 1.8% of families and 2.7% of the population were below the poverty line, including 2.1% of those under age 18 and 3.5% of those age 65 or over.

== Economy and sports ==
Netflix Studios Fort Monmouth is under construction.

Monmouth Park, a thoroughbred horse race track, is home to the annual Haskell Invitational Handicap. The choice to put the track in this small community in 1946 was made because of its prime location at the shore and its accessibility for New Yorkers and North Jersey folk who make up the majority of the track crowd. The Haskell Invitational Stakes, which next to the Triple Crown is horse racing's biggest event, takes place each year in August. In October 2007, Oceanport's Monmouth Park hosted the Breeders' Cup, attracting nearly 70,000 fans over the two days of the event. In June 2018, the Monmouth Park Sports Book by William Hill sportsbook opened and Monmouth Park became the first location in New Jersey to offer sports betting. Monmouth Park had pushed to legalize sports betting, which was legalized by the United States Supreme Court in the case Murphy v. National Collegiate Athletic Association.

== Telephone service ==
The community is served by area codes 732 and 848 for landlines, Oceanport is served by the 222, 389, 229, 544 and 542 exchanges in Area Code 732. Mobile service is through area codes 732/848 and area code 908.

== Government ==
=== Local government ===
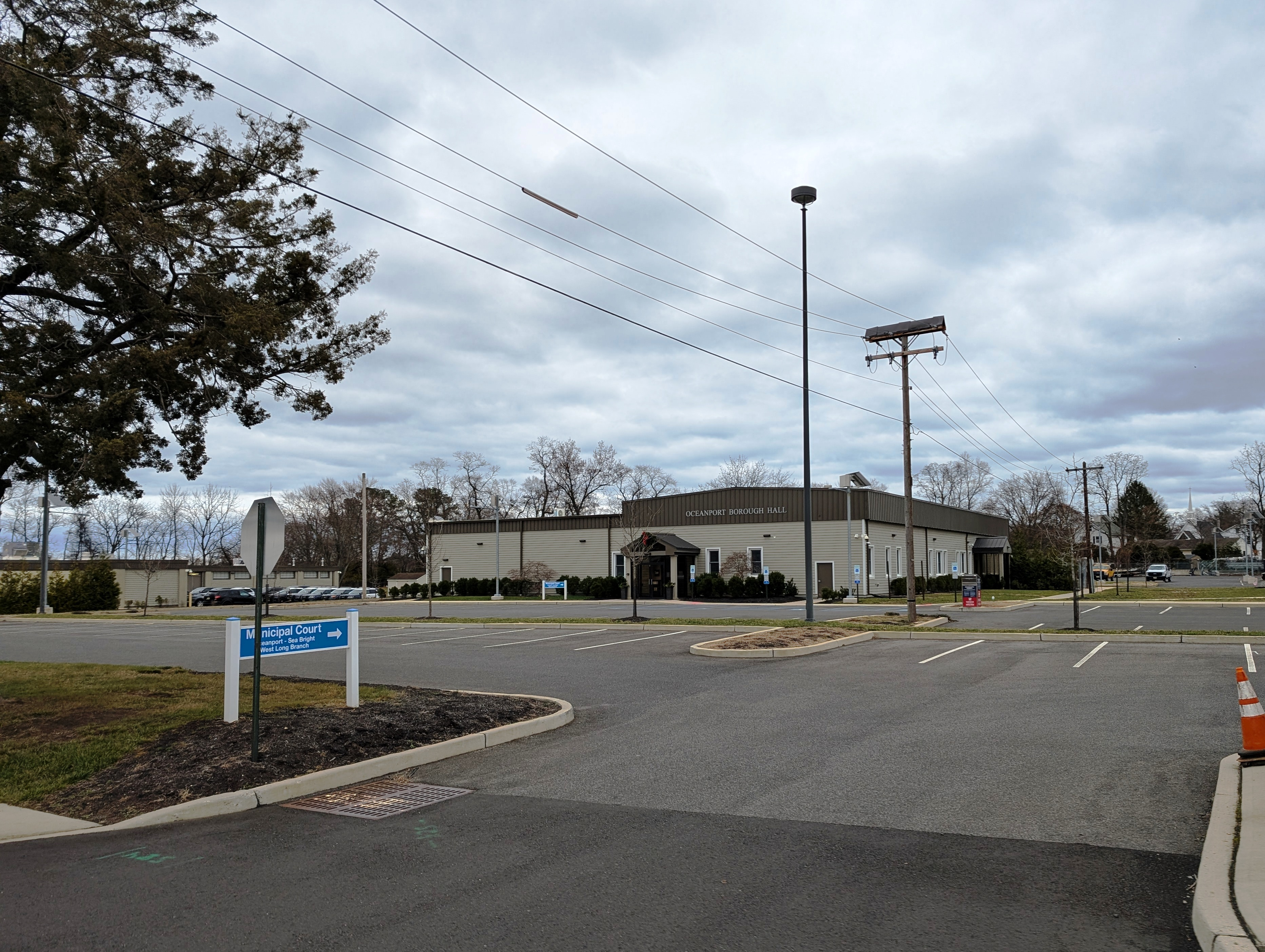
Oceanport Municipal Hall on Fort Monmouth

Oceanport is governed under the borough form of New Jersey municipal government, which is used in 218 municipalities (of the 564) statewide, making it the most common form of government in New Jersey. The governing body is comprised of the mayor and the borough council, with all positions elected at-large on a partisan basis as part of the November general election. A mayor is elected directly by the voters to a four-year term of office. The borough council includes six members elected to serve three-year terms on a staggered basis, with two seats coming up for election each year in a three-year cycle. The borough form of government used by Oceanport is a "weak mayor / strong council" government in which council members act as the legislative body with the mayor presiding at meetings and voting only in the event of a tie. The mayor can veto ordinances subject to an override by a two-thirds majority vote of the council. The mayor makes committee and liaison assignments for council members, and most appointments are made by the mayor with the advice and consent of the council.

As of 2025, the mayor of Oceanport Borough is Republican Thomas J. Tvrdik, whose term of office ends December 31, 2027. Members of the Borough Council are Council President Patricia J. Cooper (R, 2025; elected to serve an unexpired term), William Deerin (R, 2027), Richard A. Gallo Jr. (R, 2026), Bryan Keeshen (R, 2026), Michael O'Brien (R, 2027) and Keith Salnick (R, 2025).

In January 2020, the borough council selected Bryan Keeshen from a list of three candidates nominated by the Republican municipal committee to fill the seat expiring in December 2020 that had been held by Robert F. Proto until he resigned after the November 2019 general election.

In the 2015 election, John F. "Jay" Coffey II was elected as a write-in candidate.

In a special meeting held in August 2015, the borough council selected Stuart Briskey from a list of three candidates nominated by the Republican municipal committee to fill the seat expiring in December 2016 that had been held by Council President Robert Lynch until his resignation from office the previous month. Briskey served on an interim basis until the November 2015 general election, when he was elected to serve the balance of the term of office.

In March 2015, councilmember Jerry Bertekap resigned from office, leaving a vacancy in the term expiring December 2015. The borough council selected John Patti the following month to fill Bertekap's vacant seat.

In November 2013, Christopher Paglia was selected by the borough council from among three candidates offered by the Republican committee and appointed to fill the vacant seat of William Johnson, who had resigned to take a position with Monmouth County.

The borough hall completed in 1965 at the intersection of Myrtle Avenue and Monmouth Boulevard was flooded out during Hurricane Sandy in 2012. Following the storm, council meetings were held at the Maple Place Middle School library and other departments were scattered throughout Fort Monmouth and the borough's senior center. A new municipal hall opened in Fort Monmouth in January 2021 consolidating the borough's departments to one site. After being vacant for five years, the 1965 borough hall was demolished in 2017.

Oceanport is a participating municipality in an initiative to study regionalization of their municipal police force with one or more municipalities. The borough received a grant from the New Jersey Department of Community Affairs in the amount of $40,950 along with the Boroughs of Fair Haven, Little Silver, Shrewsbury and Rumson to hire professional consultants to conduct the study on their behalf. A report delivered in July 2008 recommended that Fair Haven, Little Silver and Rumson should consider a network of shared police services, with consideration of inclusion of Oceanport and Shrewsbury deferred to a second phase.

=== Federal, state and county representation ===
Oceanport is located in the 6th Congressional District and is part of New Jersey's 13th state legislative district.

For the 119th United States Congress, New Jersey's 6th congressional district is represented by Frank Pallone (D, Long Branch). New Jersey is represented in the United States Senate by Democrats Cory Booker (Newark, term ends 2027) and Andy Kim (Moorestown, term ends 2031).

For the 2026–2027 session, the 13th legislative district of the New Jersey Legislature is represented in the New Jersey Senate by Declan O'Scanlon (R, Little Silver) and in the General Assembly by Vicky Flynn (R, Holmdel Township) and Gerard Scharfenberger (R, Middletown Township).

Monmouth County is governed by a Board of County Commissioners composed of five members who are elected at-large to serve three-year terms of office on a staggered basis, with either one or two seats up for election each year as part of the November general election. At an annual reorganization meeting held in the beginning of January, the board selects one of its members to serve as director and another as deputy director.

As of 2025, Monmouth County's Commissioners are Director Thomas A. Arnone (R, Neptune City, 2025), Susan M. Kiley (R, Hazlet Township, 2027), Erik Anderson (R, Shrewsbury, 2026), Nick DiRocco (R, Wall Township, 2025), and Deputy Director Ross F. Licitra (R, Marlboro Township, 2026).

Constitutional officers elected on a countywide basis are Clerk Christine Giordano Hanlon (R, 2025; Ocean Township), Sheriff Shaun Golden (R, 2025; Howell Township) and Surrogate Rosemarie D. Peters (R, 2026; Middletown Township).

=== Politics ===
United States presidential election results for Oceanport
Year	Republican		Democratic		Third party(ies)	
Year	No.	%	No.	%	No.	%
2024	2,404	59.08%	1,638	40.26%	27	0.66%
2020	2,323	56.34%	1,748	42.40%	52	1.26%
2016	1,997	59.63%	1,249	37.29%	103	3.08%
2012	1,836	59.84%	1,200	39.11%	32	1.04%
2008	1,982	57.78%	1,408	41.05%	40	1.17%
2004	2,078	60.72%	1,316	38.46%	28	0.82%
2000	1,582	53.12%	1,271	42.68%	125	4.20%
1996	1,282	47.15%	1,208	44.43%	229	8.42%
1992	1,440	49.10%	980	33.41%	513	17.49%

As of March 2011, there were a total of 4,331 registered voters in Oceanport, of which 990 (22.9%) were registered as Democrats, 1,219 (28.1%) were registered as Republicans and 2,122 (49.0%) were registered as Unaffiliated. There were no voters registered to other parties.

Gubernatorial election results for Oceanport
Year	Republican		Democratic		Third party(ies)	
Year	No.	%	No.	%	No.	%
2025	2,057	60.02%	1,362	39.74%	8	0.23%
2021	1,804	65.17%	950	34.32%	14	0.51%
2017	1,313	64.11%	715	34.91%	20	0.98%
2013	1,455	75.15%	452	23.35%	29	1.50%
2009	1,615	66.46%	641	26.38%	174	7.16%
2005	1,305	55.39%	922	39.13%	129	5.48%

In the 2016 presidential election, Republican Donald Trump received 59.2% (1,997 votes) of the vote, ahead of Democrat Hillary Clinton with 37.0% (1249 votes) among the total 3,375 ballots cast. In the 2012 presidential election, Republican Mitt Romney received 59.8% of the vote (1,836 cast), ahead of Democrat Barack Obama with 39.1% (1,200 votes), and other candidates with 1.0% (32 votes), among the 3,087 ballots cast by the borough's 4,379 registered voters (19 ballots were spoiled), for a turnout of 70.5%. In the 2008 presidential election, Republican John McCain received 56.9% of the vote (1,982 cast), ahead of Democrat Barack Obama with 40.4% (1,408 votes) and other candidates with 1.1% (40 votes), among the 3,481 ballots cast by the borough's 4,475 registered voters, for a turnout of 77.8%. In the 2004 presidential election, Republican George W. Bush received 60.5% of the vote (2,078 ballots cast), outpolling Democrat John Kerry with 38.3% (1,316 votes) and other candidates with 0.6% (28 votes), among the 3,433 ballots cast by the borough's 4,317 registered voters, for a turnout percentage of 79.5.

In the 2013 gubernatorial election, Republican Chris Christie received 75.2% of the vote (1,455 cast), ahead of Democrat Barbara Buono with 23.3% (452 votes), and other candidates with 1.5% (29 votes), among the 1,966 ballots cast by the borough's 4,336 registered voters (30 ballots were spoiled), for a turnout of 45.3%. In the 2009 gubernatorial election, Republican Chris Christie received 65.9% of the vote (1,615 ballots cast), ahead of Democrat Jon Corzine with 26.2% (641 votes), Independent Chris Daggett with 6.5% (159 votes) and other candidates with 0.7% (17 votes), among the 2,450 ballots cast by the borough's 4,401 registered voters, yielding a 55.7% turnout.

United States Senate election results for Oceanport1
Year	Republican		Democratic		Third party(ies)	
Year	No.	%	No.	%	No.	%
2024	2,283	59.01%	1,534	39.65%	52	1.34%
2018	1,728	62.25%	956	34.44%	92	3.31%
2012	1,789	62.01%	1,064	36.88%	32	1.11%
2006	1,405	57.42%	977	39.93%	65	2.66%

United States Senate election results for Oceanport2
Year	Republican		Democratic		Third party(ies)	
Year	No.	%	No.	%	No.	%
2020	2,287	57.03%	1,667	41.57%	56	1.40%
2014	991	59.20%	641	38.29%	42	2.51%
2013	775	60.98%	478	37.61%	18	1.42%
2008	1,847	58.19%	1,262	39.76%	65	2.05%

== Education ==
Students in pre-kindergarten through eighth grade in public school are educated by the Oceanport School District. The district also includes students from Sea Bright, a non-operating district that was subject to a mandatory merger with Oceanport in 2009. As of the 2021–22 school year, the district, comprised of two schools, had an enrollment of 562 students and 65.0 classroom teachers (on an FTE basis), for a student–teacher ratio of 8.7:1. Schools in the district (with 2021–22 enrollment data from the National Center for Education Statistics) are Wolf Hill Elementary School with 310 students in pre-Kindergarten through 4th grade and Maple Place Middle School with 248 students in grades 5–8.

For ninth through twelfth grades, public school students attend Shore Regional High School, a regional high school that also serves students from the constituent districts of Monmouth Beach, Sea Bright and West Long Branch. The high school is located in West Long Branch and is part of the Shore Regional High School District. As of the 2021–22 school year, the high school had an enrollment of 613 students and 55.7 classroom teachers (on an FTE basis), for a student–teacher ratio of 11.0:1. Seats on the high school district's nine-member board of education are allocated based on the population of the constituent municipalities, with three seats assigned to Oceanport.

== Transportation ==
=== Roads and highways ===
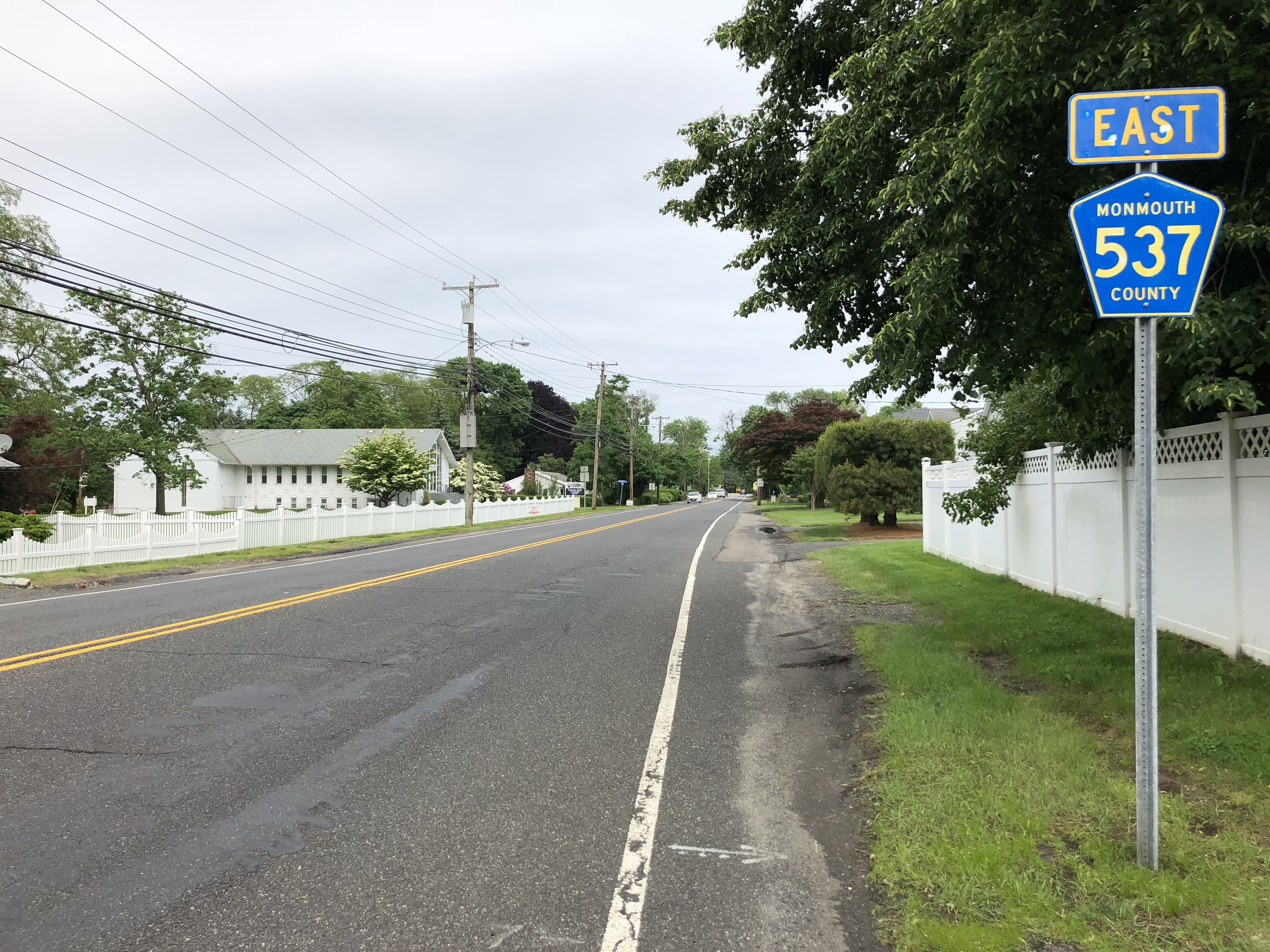
County Route 537 in Oceanport

As of 2010, Oceanport had a total of 31.26 miles (50.31 km) of roadways, of which 25.47 miles (40.99 km) were maintained by the borough, 5.46 miles (8.79 km) by Monmouth County and 0.33 miles (0.53 km) by the New Jersey Department of Transportation.

Route 71 brushes the edge of Oceanport, while CR 537 passes directly through the borough.

=== Public transportation ===
NJ Transit has a limited-service stop at the Monmouth Park station for Monmouth Park Racetrack, offering seasonal service from May through October. Service is available on the North Jersey Coast Line south to Belmar, Point Pleasant Beach and Bay Head or north to points such as Long Branch, Newark, Hoboken Terminal and New York Penn Station.

NJ Transit local bus service is provided on the 831 route.

== Notable people ==
People who were born in, residents of, or otherwise closely associated with Oceanport include:

- Charles W. Billings (1866–1928), politician who served until his death as Oceanport's first mayor and competitive shooter who was a member of the 1912 Summer Olympics American trapshooting team that won the gold medal in team clay pigeons
- Phil Bredesen (born 1943), politician and businessman who served as the 48th governor of Tennessee from 2003 to 2011
- George Conway (c. 1878–1939), horse trainer who trained War Admiral, winner of the Triple Crown in 1937
- John D'Amico Jr. (born 1941), former Oceanport councilmember who served as a county freeholder and state senator
- Brad Faxon (born 1961), professional golfer
- Harry Flaherty (born 1989), professional football tight end who has played for the New Orleans Saints and Dallas Cowboys
- S. Thomas Gagliano (1931–2019), politician who served on the Oceanport borough council and in the New Jersey Senate from 1978 to 1989
- Lewis G. Hansen (1891–1965), member of the New Jersey General Assembly who was the Democratic nominee who lost the 1946 gubernatorial election
- Charles J. O'Byrne (born 1959), top aide to former Governor of New York David Paterson
- Reverdy C. Ransom (1861–1959), Christian socialist, civil rights activist, and leader in the African Methodist Episcopal Church who was ordained and served as the 48th A.M.E. bishop
- Charles Rembar (1915–2000), lawyer best known for his First Amendment litigation
- Kevin Smith (born 1970), filmmaker, lived in Oceanport in the 1990s
