= Phil Daly Sr. =

American gambling-house proprietor (c. 1835–1910)

Phil Daly
- Born: Philip Daly; April 15, 1835; Philadelphia, Pennsylvania, U.S.
- Died: March 14, 1910 (aged 74); Long Branch, New Jersey, U.S.
- Resting place: Mount Carmel Cemetery, West Long Branch, New Jersey
- Occupation: Gambling-house proprietor
- Known for: Pennsylvania Club, Long Branch
- Children: 3

Phil Daly Sr. (April 15, 1835 – March 14, 1910) was an American gambling house operator and racetrack owner best known for operating the Pennsylvania Club in Long Branch, New Jersey, and developing Elkwood Park.

== Early life ==
Philip Daly was born on April 15, 1835, in Philadelphia, Pennsylvania, United States. His parents were Henry Daly and Margaret Montgomery Daly.

== Career ==
Phil Daly began his career in the newspaper business in Philadelphia and later took charge of an establishment in Norfolk, Virginia.

=== Pennsylvania Club ===
Daly established himself in Long Branch, New Jersey in 1877. He bought property from John Hoey and founded the Pennsylvania Club in Long Branch on the corner of Ocean and Brighton avenues. He developed it into one of the highest class and most exclusive gambling clubs in the United States. He maintained a first-class restaurant in connection with his club, where the finest service was given. The clubhouse was owned by the Dalys for 30 years. Daly was forced to close the doors of his club in the early 1900s, as a result of the efforts of John Franklin Fort, then a circuit court judge and later governor of New Jersey. His establishment was later sold for $70,000 in 1909.

=== Elkwood Park ===
Daly developed Elkwood Park in the 1890s. The Daly family managed Elkwood Park and its track up to 1905. The Dalys sold the property to Walter and Fred Lewisohn.

== 1888 shooting ==
In early December 1888, Daly was the target of an attempted robbery involving a badger game scheme. While staying at the Coleman House in New York City, he received two letters signed "Addie Stanton," requesting that he visit an apartment at 406 Fourth Avenue on important business. He initially disregarded the invitation but later Daly visited the address. After being greeted by a young woman and left alone in the flat, the doors leading from a back room opened and two men rushed in. When the masked men tried to rob Daly of $30,000, he ignored their orders and lunged at them. One of the men, Edward Meredith, shot Daly, who narrowly escaped with his life. He was wounded in the temple and the men fled the scene. Within a few days, the police had all four members of the gang, which included Meredith, Henry Hermann, Adelaide Stanton, and Ella Hammond, in custody.

== Later life and death ==
After retiring from the clubhouse in the late 1890s, Daly lived a secluded life. In June 1897, he suffered acute cardiac arrest and edema of the lungs.

Phil Daly Sr. died from heart disease on March 14, 1910, in Long Branch, New Jersey, United States.
