= Port-au-peck, New Jersey =

Populated place in Monmouth County, New Jersey, US

- Unincorporated community
- Location of Port-au-peck in Monmouth County. Inset: Location of county within the state of New Jersey Port-au-peck (New Jersey) Port-au-peck (the United States)
- Coordinates: 40°18′54″N 74°00′28″W
- Country: United States
- State: New Jersey
- County: Monmouth
- Borough: Oceanport
- Elevation: 20 ft (6.1 m)
- Time zone: UTC−05:00 (Eastern (EST))
  - Summer (DST): UTC−04:00 (EDT)
- ZIP Code: 07757
- GNIS feature ID: 882544

Port-au-peck is an unincorporated community located within Oceanport in Monmouth County, in the U.S. state of New Jersey. The name Port-Au-Peck comes from the Lenape name Pootapeck. The land was "sold" to English interests in 1670; however, it is unclear how fair this land transfer was or if the local residents were aware they were giving away their hunting and fishing rights in the transfer.

== Geography ==
Port-au-peck covers 3.9 square miles (10 km^{2}), approximately half of Oceanport. It is the area north-north-east of the New Jersey Transit Monmouth Park line. It forms a peninsula jutting into the Shrewsbury River and is formed in the shape of a mitten or to some a fox.

== Demography ==
While no specific data is taken for Port-au-peck (as it is not census recognized) the neighborhood would be considered by most to be middle class to upper-middle class and is mostly, almost 100% white. Port-au-peck is higher income and more residential than the Eatontown side of Oceanport proper.

== ZIP Code ==
Port-au-peck uses the same ZIP Code (07757) as Oceanport, which has only one post office. Because of this Port-au-peck has been somewhat forgotten in the past years. Few residents in Oceanport use Port-au-peck as a mailing address.
