= Elkwood Park =

Former horse racing venue in Oceanport, New Jersey, U.S.

- Location: Oceanport, New Jersey, U.S.
- Owner: Phil Daly Sr. (1888–1905); Frederick & Walter Lewisohn (1905–1924); J. William Jones & Oliver G. Frake (1924–1926)
- Type: Horse racing, auto racing
- Surface: Dirt
- Field size: 1 mile (1.6 km) oval

Construction
- Opened: 1888

Elkwood Park was a horse racing and automobile racing venue in the borough of Oceanport in Monmouth County, New Jersey, United States. Established in 1888, Elkwood Park hosted harness racing, automobile races, polo, golf, baseball, and local fairs.

== History ==
=== Founding and early years ===
Elkwood Park was established in 1888 in Oceanport, New Jersey. The driving force behind Elkwood Park was Phil Daly Sr., a noted gambler and proprietor of the Pennsylvania Club in Long Branch, New Jersey. That year, Daly followed a hunch that a Thoroughbred horse named Elkwood would win the feature event at Monmouth Park Racetrack. When Elkwood won the Suburban Stakes near the end of the 1888 racing season, Daly won $10,000 which he used to begin building a new racing plant named in Elkwood's honor.

It was proposed that Monmouth County needed another race track for Mondays, Wednesdays, and Fridays. The proposed track would co-exist with the original Monmouth Park Racetrack and hold meetings on the off days of the Monmouth Association. An association was organized under the direction of Long Branch Mayor George W. Brown and with the backing of Phil Daly Sr. Daly bought land in parcels at ordinary farm prices until he had acquired title to more than 100 acres. The property was near Branchport, at the Monmouth Park Junction of the Central and Southern railroads of New Jersey. Dating back to the 1830s, the land was part of a larger tract owned by the Brinley family.

In October 1888, construction of a new one-mile track was underway and contracts were finalized for finishing the stands, buildings, and stables. At Elkwood Park on November 30, 1888, a trap shooting match between Daly's son, Philip Daly Jr., and Annie Oakley was held before a crowd of 3,000 people. Plans for Elkwood Park were hindered by the widely publicized attempted robbery involving Daly in December 1888. Although surveying and fencing had been completed, the racetrack remained unfinished. By then, Daly had nearly 200 men employed at the new track. The plans were ultimately not carried out after work was stopped at Elkwood Park in April 1889.

The stockholders of Elkwood Park Association held an annual meeting in 1890 where the board of directors elected were Phil Daly Jr., D. C. Newing, Al Cuberly, Thomas R. Worthley, W. H. Campbell, C. V. N. Wilson, and Thomas Patten. The elder Daly continued as a backer of Elkwood Park while its management was in the hands of Daly Jr.

Elkwood Park Grand Stand, 1901

In late 1892, Daly Sr. advanced the Elkwood Park Association $35,000 to complete the necessary upgrades to Elkwood Park as a trotting track. The Elkwood Park Association awarded the contract for building the grandstand and betting ring to contractor R. H. Hughes in March 1893 for $9,340. Specifications prepared by architect Frank S. Brand called for a wooden grandstand measuring 140 by 38 feet, with a 16-by-57-foot extension in the back. The design featured refreshment stands on the ground floor and seating for spectators on the second floor. Preparations for the track also included the construction of stables and supporting facilities for the inaugural summer meeting.

Sketch of Elkwood Park, 1898

The race track at Elkwood Park opened on July 15, 1893, featuring a series of pony races and prizes offered. The first two meetings proved successful and were continued every Saturday morning throughout the season until early September 1893.

Once laws against horse race betting were introduced in 1894, both Elkwood Park and Monmouth Park Race Track were shut down. Elkwood Park was later revived and various sporting events were staged there occasionally. The grounds were spacious and offered facilities for golf, fly casting, pigeon shooting, and other sports. The program of the Grand American Handicap held under the auspices of the Interstate Association was first hosted at Elkwood Park in March 1897. The large trap shooting event was held at Elkwood Park twice.

Markmen's Club House At Elkwood Park, Long Branch, N. J., 1897

Elkwood Park's clubhouse was situated at the entrance of the grounds. The sporting lodge had been constructed at a cost of $35,000. It served as the designated golf and trap shooting clubhouse and provided lockers, gun racks, shell loaders, punching bags, a billiard table, as well as a complete kitchen and buffet that seated 1,000 people. In 1901, a new grandstand with a seating capacity of 11,600 was completed by the Gentleman's Riding and Driving Club.

Elkwood Park was a popular venue while the Grand American Handicap shoots were held there but had been lying idle for two years by 1903.

=== Lewisohn estate ===
Phil Daly's wife later sold the property to Frederick and Walter Lewisohn of New York on September 20, 1905. The pair were the sons of Leonard Lewisohn, a founder of the banking firm called Lewisohn Brothers. The new owners spent a large amount of money in making Elkwood Park a show place after purchasing the property. The Lewisohns erected a mansion, casino, stables, carriage house, and other buildings. They also built a polo field and laid out a nine-hole golf course. A six-acre pond was built in the infield of the track. Walter Lewisohn also acquired 74 acres across from Elkwood Park on Port-au-Peck Ave for growing crops.

During this period, the United Hunt meet was a popular event held at Elkwood Park. Matinee racing was held under the direction of the Elkwood Park Driving Club in 1906. Efforts were made in 1908 to revive racing at Elkwood Park without betting. After applying for Grand Circuit dates in 1908, the track was granted a place on the circuit but was unable to hold a meeting. Later in the 1908 season the track was turned over to auto racing. The Elkwood Park Automobile Association was established to organize a Fourth of July race meet at the Elkwood Park track. Officers of the association included Charles C. McFadden as president, Robert Guggenheim vice president, William B. Anderson treasurer, and T. Francis Moore as secretary. Fred and Walter Lewisohn served on the board of directors along with Harry Payne Whitney, W. E. D. Stokes, P. J. Casey, Martin H. Vogel, and Col. T. J. O'Donahue.

The Elkwood Park track featured on the Grand Circuit from August 30 to September 3, 1909, filling the vacany of Readville Race Track.

The Elkwood Park Steeplechase Association was organized in 1911 with Walter Lewisohn serving as president. An eight-jump steeplechase was constructed within the centerfield of the track.

=== Ku Klux Klan ===
On June 20, 1924, majority of Elkwood Park was purchased by J. William Jones and Oliver G. Frake. The Ku Klux Klan, a white supremacist group in the United States, sought the land for a meeting place for thousands of members who came from all over New Jersey. It was first used for a large gathering called the Tri-State Klonklave on the Fourth of July that year. Elkwood Park served as the state headquarters for the Ku Klux Klan and its Long Branch and Red Bank units from 1924 to 1926.

In April 1926, the Elkwood Park Company purchased the tract from the Ku Klux Klan for redevelopment. The syndicate from Elizabeth, New Jersey formed the Elkwood Park Company with Benjamin C. Landa as president, John P. Tulules as treasurer, and Judge John R. Conley as secretary.

== Closure and redevelopment ==
The rights to the property were acquired by the Monmouth Parking Racing Association when betting on horse racing became legal again. In 1946, the original Elkwood Park became the site of the present-day Monmouth Park Racetrack.
