= Vincent J. Murphy =

American politician (1893–1976)

32nd Mayor of Newark
- In office 1941–1949
- Preceded by: Meyer C. Ellenstein
- Succeeded by: Ralph A. Villani

1st President of the New Jersey AFL-CIO
- In office 1961–1970
- Preceded by: Louis P. Marciante (as AFL president)
- Succeeded by: Charles H. Marciante

Personal details
- Born: August 1, 1893 Newark, New Jersey, U.S.
- Died: June 8, 1976 (aged 82) Spring Lake, New Jersey, U.S.
- Party: Democratic

Vincent Joseph Murphy (August 1, 1893 – June 8, 1976) was an American labor leader and Democratic Party politician from New Jersey. He was mayor of Newark, New Jersey from 1941 to 1949 and the Democratic nominee for governor of New Jersey in 1943. From 1961 until 1970, he was president of the New Jersey chapter of the AFL-CIO.

== Early life ==
Vincent Joseph Murphy was born on August 1, 1893 in Newark, New Jersey. He was the second eldest of 10 children of Thomas Francis Murphy and Sarah Gaskin.

== Labor organizer ==
At the age of 15, Murphy became a plumber's apprentice and joined the Local 24 of the United Association of Journeymen and Apprentices of the Plumbing, Pipefitting and Sprinkler Fitting Industry in 1913, serving as its secretary-treasurer from 1920 to 1938.

In 1933, Murphy was named secretary-treasurer of the New Jersey Federation of Labor. He served for many years under influential president Louis P. Marciante.

=== New Jersey AFL-CIO president (1961–70) ===
In March 1961, Marciante died of a heart attack after twenty-seven years as AFL president. Murphy was unanimously elected to succeed him. He presided over the state AFL-CIO merger on September 25, 1961 and became the first president of the new organization.

During the 1961 New Jersey gubernatorial election, Murphy and the AFL-CIO remained neutral between Richard J. Hughes and James P. Mitchell, a Republican popular with organized labor from his tenure as industrial personnel director during World War II and as U.S. Secretary of Labor. Hughes won the election. Although the two men conflicted at times during his term in office, particularly over Murphy's opposition to a jetport in Somerset County, Murphy and the AFL-CIO endorsed Hughes in 1965, and Hughes appointed Murphy to the state's Economic Development Council.

In 1969, Murphy once again led the AFL-CIO to remain neutral in the gubernatorial election, citing the closed process which had resulted in the nomination of Robert B. Meyner by the Democratic Party and Meyner's lack of labor credentials. However, leaders within the state labor movement, including Steve Adubato Sr., criticized the decision and claimed there was never a vote on a potential endorsement. Although Murphy maintained that the decision had been made by a voice vote and declined bids for further discussion, he was physically removed from the labor convention hall, and the convention formally endorsed Meyner.

Murphy announced his plans for retirement in summer 1969, and he was succeeded by secretary-treasurer Charles H. Marciante, his predecessor's son.

== Political career ==
=== Newark politics (1937–49) ===
Murphy entered politics in 1937 by running for a seat on the five-member Newark City Commission. At the time, Newark did not directly elect its mayor, and the position was traditionally bestowed on the commissioner who received the most votes at the prior election. Murphy, an ally of Jersey City mayor and Democratic political boss Frank Hague, ran against incumbent mayor Meyer C. Ellenstein. Although Murphy received the most votes of the 48 candidates on the ballot and Ellenstein received far fewer votes than he had in 1933, the majority of the winners were allies of Ellenstein, who was re-elected as mayor.

In 1941, Murphy was narrowly re-elected and Ellenstein lost his seat on the commission. Although Murphy finished fifth, he won the support of commissioners Joseph W. Byrne and John B. Keenan, and he was elected as mayor.

After his failed campaign for governor in 1943, Murphy was re-elected to the commission in 1945, finishing first. In the same election, Ellenstein returned to the commission as the fifth place finisher.

In 1949, Murphy was defeated for re-election to the commission, finishing sixth. Ellenstein finished first. Two other labor leaders, Stephen J. Moran of the rival Congress of Industrial Organizations and Leo P. Carlin of the Teamsters union, were elected to the commission that year. Murphy was succeeded as mayor by longtime commissioner Ralph A. Villani.

=== 1943 gubernatorial campaign ===
In 1943, Murphy ran for governor of New Jersey in an effort to succeed term-limited incumbent Charles Edison. Edison, a staunch critic of the Hague machine, sought to block U.S. senator and former three-term governor A. Harry Moore from the nomination. Murphy, who had the support of labor unions and a high profile as the mayor of the state's largest city, won support from party leaders as a compromise candidate. He was unopposed in the Democratic primary.

In the general election, Murphy faced Republican former governor and U.S. senator Walter Evans Edge. Edge, who had allied with Hague across party lines early in their careers, attacked Murphy for his association with the party boss. He emphasized his prior experience as a wartime governor three decades earlier and warned that a Democratic victory would lead to a domination of the state by "labor leaders, communists and Hagueism." Murphy was defeated by a margin of 127,000 votes, carrying only Camden, Hudson, and Middlesex counties.

== Personal life and death ==
Murphy died at his home in Spring Lake, New Jersey on June 8, 1976, aged 82. He had fourteen grandchildren.

Political offices
Preceded by Meyer C. Ellenstein	Mayor of Newark; 1941–1949	Succeeded by Ralph A. Villani
Party political offices
Preceded by Charles Edison	Democratic Nominee for Governor of New Jersey; 1943	Succeeded by Lewis G. Hansen
