= Alfred E. Driscoll =

American politician (1902–1975)

Alfred Driscoll
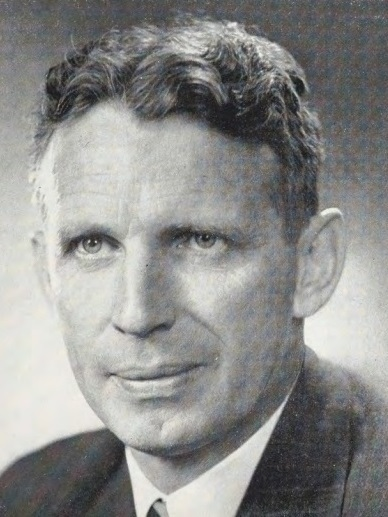
- Driscoll in 1956

43rd Governor of New Jersey
- In office January 21, 1947 – January 19, 1954
- Preceded by: Walter Evans Edge
- Succeeded by: Robert B. Meyner

Member of the New Jersey Senate from Camden County
- In office 1939–1941
- Preceded by: Albert E. Burling
- Succeeded by: Bruce A. Wallace

Personal details
- Born: October 25, 1902 Pittsburgh, Pennsylvania, U.S.
- Died: March 9, 1975 (aged 72) Haddonfield, New Jersey, U.S.
- Party: Republican
- Spouse: Antoinette Ware Tatem (m. 1932)
- Education: Williams College; Harvard Law School (LL.B.)

Alfred Eastlack Driscoll (October 25, 1902 – March 9, 1975) was an American attorney and Republican Party politician who served as the 43rd governor of New Jersey from 1947 to 1954. As governor, he led the crusade for the 1947 state constitution, which strengthened the executive branch, streamlined the judiciary, and outlawed segregation in the state. He was the first governor to serve consecutive terms in office, as permitted by the new constitution. In his second term, he oversaw the completion and initial expansion of the New Jersey Turnpike and parts of the construction for the Garden State Parkway, the latter of which had its Rartian River Bridge renamed in his honor in 1974, at which he attended.

Prior to his election as governor, Driscoll represented Camden County in the New Jersey Senate from 1939 to 1941. He later served as president of Warner-Lambert (now a part of Pfizer).

== Early life and education ==
Alfred Eastlack Driscoll was born on October 25, 1902, in Pittsburgh, Pennsylvania. He was the only child of Alfred Robie Driscoll and Mattie Eastlack Driscoll. His mother was active in church, reform, and educational movements and was among the founders of Peddie School in Hightstown, New Jersey. Driscoll's ancestry can be traced to Haddonfield, New Jersey during the American Revolution, and in 1906, his family returned to Haddonfield.

Driscoll graduated from Haddonfield Memorial High School in 1921, where he captained the debate and track teams, was recognized as the most outstanding student and won the Childrey Award for his work ethic.

He attended Williams College, where he again captained the track team, participated in debate, and was one of two four-letter athletes. He graduated from Williams in 1925. He later reflected on his college days, "When I was in college I had a bad case of wanderlust. I went to sea during a couple of summer vacations. I worked as a cook with an expedition to the Canadian Rockies and another time, I cooked for an outfit that went north to the Arctic Circle. I used to justify myself by saying that I was building windows out of which I could look after I had settled down."

In 1928, he was awarded an LL.B. degree from Harvard Law School.

== Early career ==
=== Local politics ===
After graduating from Harvard, Driscoll returned home to join the firm of Starr, Sumerhill and Lloyd in Camden, New Jersey. He was soon recruited to run for the Haddonfield Board of Education on a reform ticket against the local Republican machine. When informed that the Republicans had already selected their ticket, Driscoll retorted, "Until a minute ago, I didn't want to run. Now, I'm going to." He served on the board for seven years until resigning in 1937 to run for the Haddonfield Borough Commission. While on the board, he gained the attention of reform leaders in North Jersey led by Arthur T. Vanderbilt, known as the "Clean Government" movement.

He was elected to the Haddonfield Commission in 1937, serving as director of revenue and finance, a position he used to significantly lower municipal taxes and debt.

=== State Senator and reform efforts ===
In 1937, the Clean Government movement recruited Driscoll to oppose the entrenched Republican Party machine in Camden County, led by David Baird Jr. Driscoll defeated the Baird candidate in the Republican primary and went on to win the general election in the heavily Republican county. (Note: Prior to 1974, members of the New Jersey Senate were elected to represent entire counties.) In the concurrent election for governor, Republican candidate Lester H. Clee, a member of the Clean Government movement, lost to United States Senator and former Governor A. Harry Moore. Driscoll was among those to decry corrupt practices by the Democratic machine in the 1937 election, including "the burning of ballots". He retained his seat on the Haddonfield Commission.

In 1940, Driscoll managed Robert C. Hendrickson's unsuccessful campaign for governor against Charles Edison. Though the election was a setback for the Republican Party, which lost seats in the legislature, Driscoll was named senate majority leader. His brief term as majority leader was dominated by conflict between the rural "old guard" of the Republican Party and the urban Democratic machine led by Frank Hague of Jersey City. He was shortly appointed by the legislature to serve as alcoholic beverage commissioner for the state, where he established a reputation as a strict and impartial watchdog over an industry known for scandal and corruption.

During his time as alcoholic beverage commissioner, Driscoll became involved in bipartisan efforts to reform the New Jersey Constitution. Governor Walter Evans Edge appointed Driscoll to the five-man Commission on State Administrative Reorganization, which investigated one hundred independent agencies and fifty independent boards and commissions, recommending consolidation of twenty-four agencies into five principal departments. Though the Commission's recommendations were adopted, the new proposed constitution was rejected by voters in 1944, precluding further reforms.

== Governor of New Jersey ==
He served as Governor of New Jersey from 1947 to 1954. In his first term, he led the successful movement for a new state constitution, which strengthened the executive branch, reformed the judiciary and outlawed segregation in New Jersey. In his second term, he led the construction of the New Jersey Turnpike and planning of the Garden State Parkway, two major transportation links which transformed the agrarian "Garden State" into the most densely populated state in the union. Driscoll served as a delegate to the Republican National Convention from New Jersey in 1948 and 1952, and he was considered for the vice presidential nomination at the 1952 convention.

=== 1946 election ===
In 1946, Driscoll ran for governor with the support of the incumbent, Walter Evans Edge. In the primary, he defeated former governor Harold G. Hoffman. In the general election, Republicans successfully attacked the unpopular federal administration of Harry S. Truman and tied Democratic nominee Lewis G. Hansen to Frank Hague. Driscoll stressed his experience and promised strong, efficient state government, but only addressed constitutional reform in general terms. He defeated Hansen in a landslide with a 221,000 vote majority.

=== First term (1947–50) ===
In his inaugural address, Driscoll surprised listeners and political observers by calling for a constitutional convention to reform or replace the New Jersey Constitution. Having studied proposals by his predecessors, Edison and Edge, Driscoll attributed their failures to partisanship and corruption in the legislature and framed the 1944 failure as a vote against the particular proposal rather than a vote of confidence in the existing Constitution of 1844. Instead, Driscoll proposed that a convention would remove the matter from partisan debate. After wrangling over the apportionment of delegates between the counties and assurances from Driscoll that the convention would not address legislative reapportionment, the legislature complied with the proposal.

The convention began in New Brunswick on June 12, with a referendum planned for November. As governor, Driscoll made a number of maneuvers to shepherd the convention to its final proposal. Ahead of the convention, he established a Commission on Preparatory Research to establish tentative rules for its conduct and provide a reference library for delegates. He engaged with county leaders to ensure bipartisan delegations were sent and officers were elected in advance. Throughout the proceedings, Driscoll reviewed daily transcripts of meetings and floor deliberations, appeared as witness, and was personally briefed by delegate George Walton. In at least two instances, Driscoll personally intervened to address divisive issues which threatened proceedings, first by issuing a plea to remove the controversial issue of gambling legalisation from consideration and second, after a deadlock on the floor, negotiating an agreement with Jersey City leaders on the issue of railroad taxation. The compromise on the latter issue required Driscoll to support repealing a bill he had sponsored as senator in 1941 establishing preferential tax rates for railroads and angered longtime supporters, including Vanderbilt and Edge. Nevertheless, historians credit Driscoll's compromise with saving the 1947 constitution.

The final draft of the constitution resulted in a strengthened the executive branch and streamlined the judiciary. In addition, it established a merit system for state employment, guaranteed a right to collective bargaining for private employees, and made New Jersey the first state to constitutionally outlaw racial segregation. At the November referendum, it was ratified by a margin of 470,464 votes.

Driscoll continued to pursue reform, consolidating state agencies in an effort to reduce costs and combat corruption and organized crime. New Jersey was the first state to consolidate either law enforcement or fiscal management in this way, leading twenty-eight other states to follow suit. Driscoll also aggressively supported civil rights under the new constitution, empowering the Department of Education to enforce its anti-segregation provision and backing legislation which made it a misdemeanor offense to bar any child from public schools or discharge a teacher on grounds of race, religion or national origin. He also integrated the New Jersey National Guard and endorsed the Freeman Act, which prohibited discrimination in public accommodations on account of race, color or creed. The Freeman Act, which predated the federal Civil Rights Act of 1964, had stalled in the legislature before Driscoll made it part of his legislative agenda.

He also raised minimum teachers' salaries from $1,200 to $2,200, established a temporary disability insurance program for workers and reformed the state parole system.

In 1949, Driscoll appointed William J. Brennan Jr., a Democrat, to his first judicial appointment on the New Jersey Superior Court. Later, in 1951, Driscoll elevated Brennan to the Supreme Court of New Jersey, where he served until appointed to the Supreme Court of the United States by President Dwight D. Eisenhower in 1956.

=== 1949 election ===
In 1949, Driscoll was the first governor eligible to run for re-election to a second term, a provision added by the 1947 constitution. After defeating a surprisingly strong challenge in the Republican primary from Somerset County freeholder Robert L. Adams, Driscoll faced Elmer H. Wene in the general election. Frank Hague, whose power in Jersey City was waning, sought to use the Wene campaign to re-establish a statewide base of support. However, Driscoll received the support of insurgent Democratic reformers in Hudson County and became the first Republican since Warren G. Harding to carry Jersey City. Despite this, Wene lost narrowly by winning strong margins in South Jersey.

=== Second term (1950–54) ===
In his second inaugural address, Driscoll outlined a vision of "working federalism," arguing that states should have greater initiative and cooperation and that the federal government should devolve more functions to the states. "In our republic, it has been the traditional task of the states to protection individual freedom," Driscoll said. "Despite the contention of some who would put their trust in strong, centralized government in the nation's capital, Big Government sooner or later ceases to be either representative or responsible. It retains the appearance of a union of states and of popular representation, but abandons the substance."

Driscoll's second term in office was marked by three major infrastructure projects; the New Jersey Turnpike and the Walt Whitman Bridge were each opened, and construction on the Garden State Parkway began. The Turnpike Authority was created in 1949, issued its first bonds in 1950 and completed the entire 118-mile turnpike project in twenty-three months. Driscoll closely supervised the project, making regular unnanounced on-site inspections. The New Jersey Highway Authority was established to build the Garden State Parkway in 1952, and the 164-mile road opened in 1954.

In his final year in office, Driscoll supervised the purchases of Island Beach State Park and Wharton State Forest and planned the development of Sandy Hook State Park, intended to compete with Jones Beach State Park for New York visitors. Driscoll also coordinated with Governor of New York Thomas E. Dewey on the establishment of the Bistate Waterfront Commission to combat racketeering and corruption on the Hudson River docks.

Despite these achievements, Driscoll's second term was marked by a pair of political scandals which did not implicate his administration but weakened his position within the Republican Party. The first involved the purchase of two privately owned bridges from Burlington County Republican Party chair Clifford R. Powell by the Burlington County Board of Chosen Freeholders. The state had planned to acquire the bridges for $4,900,000 through condemnation, but the freeholders bid $12,400,000. Driscoll moved to block the sale and removed Powell from his position from his position as chief of staff of the National Guard. In the second scandal, Driscoll directed deputy attorney general Nelson Stamler to intervene in a major gambling scandal in Bergen County. Before Stamler's prosecution was complete, he was removed by the Attorney General. Though Driscoll was never personally implicated, later legislative investigations revealed that the brother of a defendant had appealed to the state Republican Party chairman to relieve pressure and another defendant briefly worked in Driscoll's office as a clerk. Though neither scandals implicated Driscoll's integrity, his lifelong independence from the Republican machine was flipped against him as a failure of leadership which threatened the function of government.

== Retirement ==
After leaving office in 1954, Driscoll assumed the presidency of the Warner-Hudnut Company, later Warner-Lambert Pharmaceutical Company and today part of Pfizer. He remained active in government as president of the National Municipal League and an active member of a citizens' committee in favor of the Gateway National Recreation Area, the New Jersey Historical Commission and the Kerner Commission. He supported efforts by Richard J. Hughes and William T. Cahill to issue bonds and reform taxes, respectively.

In 1970, William T. Cahill appointed Driscoll head of the New Jersey Turnpike Authority.

== Death and legacy ==
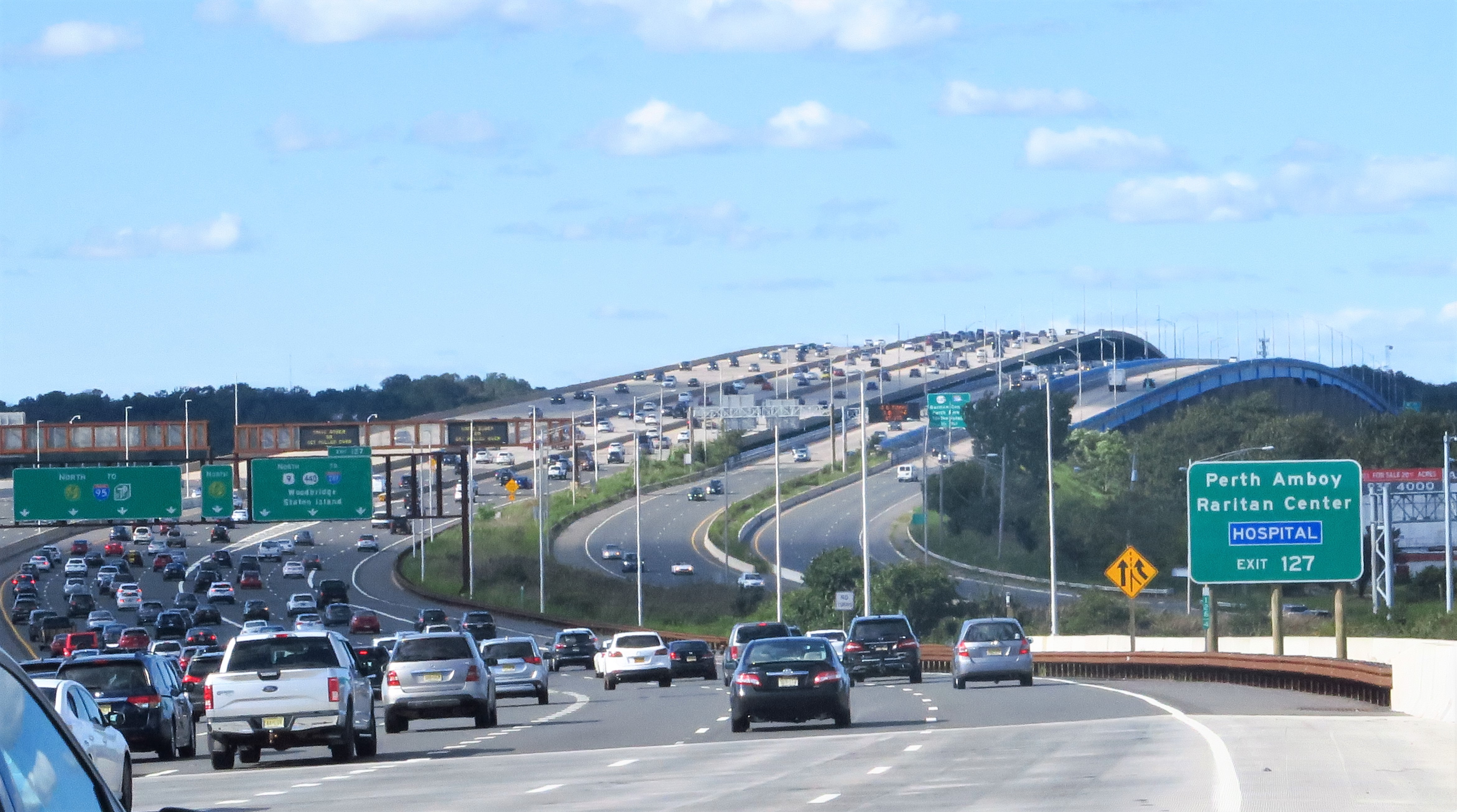
The Driscoll Bridge was named in his honor in 1974.

Driscoll died on March 9, 1975, at his home in Haddonfield, New Jersey. Although he was a Presbyterian, Driscoll was buried at the Haddonfield Baptist Churchyard.

=== Legacy ===
The Driscoll Bridge on the Garden State Parkway spans the Raritan River near its mouth and was named after Driscoll in 1974.

In 1971, a failed planned extension of the New Jersey Turnpike which would have connected it to the Parkway, similar in nature to the Pennsylvania Turnpike's Northeast Extension, would have also borne his name.

== See also ==
- List of governors of New Jersey

== Notes ==
Political offices
Preceded by Walter E. Edge	Governor of New Jersey; January 21, 1947 – January 19, 1954	Succeeded by Robert B. Meyner
Party political offices
Preceded by Walter Evans Edge	Republican Nominee for Governor of New Jersey; 1946, 1949	Succeeded by Paul L. Troast
Non-profit organization positions
Preceded by William Collins	President of the National Municipal League; December, 1962–1970	Succeeded by William W. Scranton
