= Lewis G. Hansen =

American lawyer, judge, and politician

Lewis Gustave Hansen (November 18, 1891 – November 18, 1965) was an American lawyer, judge, and politician who was the Democratic nominee for Governor of New Jersey in 1946.

== Biography ==
Hansen was born in 1891 in Jersey City, New Jersey. He received a master's degree from New York University School of Law in 1913 and was a counsellor-at-law in New Jersey beginning in 1916. He served one term in the New Jersey General Assembly before becoming first assistant prosecutor in Hudson County. From 1933 to 1940 he was first assistant corporation counsel in Jersey City. He was then appointed by Governor A. Harry Moore to the Second District Court of Jersey City.

Hansen resigned his judicial position in 1946 to run for Governor of New Jersey against the Republican candidate Alfred E. Driscoll. He lost by more than 221,000 votes. Following his defeat he was campaign manager in 1949 for the City Commission ticket in Jersey City backed by political boss Frank Hague. The ticket was unsuccessful, as John V. Kenny defeated Hague's nephew, Frank H. Eggers, in the Jersey City mayoral race. Hansen was reported to have been the first person to greet Kenny on the day he was sworn in.

Hansen served as Surrogate of Hudson County before retiring in 1957 to Oceanport, New Jersey. In 1965 he died in West Palm Beach, Florida, on his 74th birthday.

Party political offices
Preceded by Vincent J. Murphy	Democratic Nominee for Governor of New Jersey; 1946	Succeeded by Elmer H. Wene
