= 1946 New Jersey gubernatorial election =

- November 5, 1946
- Turnout: 67% (▲12.01%)
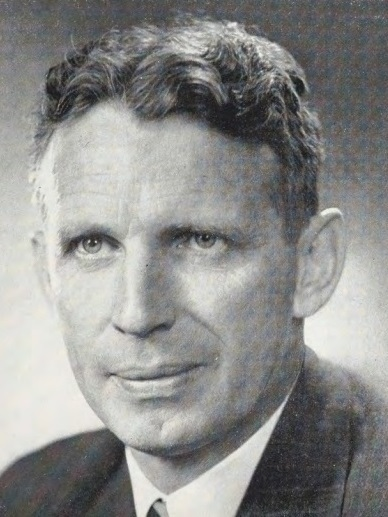

| Nominee | Alfred E. Driscoll | Lewis G. Hansen |
| Party | Republican | Democratic |
| Popular vote | 807,378 | 585,960 |
| Percentage | 57.08% | 41.42% |
- County results Driscoll: 50–60% 60–70% 70–80% Hansen: 50–60% 60–70%
Governor before election
Walter Evans Edge
Republican
Elected Governor
Alfred E. Driscoll
Republican

The 1946 New Jersey gubernatorial election was held on November 5, 1946. Republican state senator Alfred E. Driscoll defeated Democratic nominee Lewis G. Hansen with approximately 57 percent of the vote.

For the last time, the governor of New Jersey was elected to a three-year term. Afterwards, New Jersey governors would be elected for terms of four years. As of 2026, this was the last time a Republican was elected to succeed another Republican as governor of New Jersey.

Primary elections were held on June 4, 1946. Driscoll defeated former governor Harold G. Hoffman for the Republican nomination, while Hansen was unopposed for the Democratic nomination. Former Democratic governor Charles Edison ran as an independent before withdrawing from the race to endorse Driscoll.

== Republican primary ==
=== Candidates ===
- Alfred E. Driscoll, former state senator for Camden County
- Harold G. Hoffman, former governor (1935–38) and U.S. representative

=== Results ===
Republican primary results
| Party | Candidate | Votes | % |
|---|---|---|---|
| Republican | Alfred E. Driscoll | 281,715 | 57.96 |
| Republican | Harold G. Hoffman | 204,306 | 42.04 |
| Total votes | | 486,021 | 100.00 |

== Democratic primary ==
=== Candidates ===
- Lewis G. Hansen, former judge of the Second District Court of Jersey City, State Assemblyman, and assistant corporation counsel of Jersey City

=== Results ===
Democratic Party primary results
| Party | Candidate | Votes | % |
|---|---|---|---|
| Democratic | Lewis G. Hansen | 162,845 | 100.00 |
| Total votes | | 162,845 | 100.00 |

== General election ==
=== Candidates ===
- John Binns (Prohibition)
- George E. Bopp (Socialist Labor)
- Alfred E. Driscoll, former state senator for Camden County (Republican)
- Robert L. Gittings (Anti Medical Trust Federation)
- Lewis G. Hansen, former Jersey City judge and assemblyman (Democratic)
- Alan Kohlman (Socialist Workers)
- Lawrence Mahan (Communist)
- Rubye Smith (Socialist)

==== Withdrew ====
- Charles Edison, former Governor of New Jersey (Independent Democratic) (endorsed Driscoll)

=== Results ===
New Jersey gubernatorial election, 1946
| Party | Candidate | Votes | % | ±% |
|---|---|---|---|---|
| Republican | Alfred E. Driscoll | 807,378 | 57.08% | ▲1.88 |
| Democratic | Lewis G. Hansen | 585,960 | 41.42% | ▼2.66 |
| Socialist Workers | Alan Kohlman | 9,823 | 0.69% | N/A |
| Communist | Lawrence Mahan | 4,031 | 0.29% | N/A |
| Socialist | Rubye Smith | 2,326 | 0.16% | ▲0.02 |
| Independent | Robert L. Gittings | 2,108 | 0.15% | N/A |
| Socialist Labor | George E. Bopp | 1,476 | 0.10% | ▼0.30 |
| Prohibition | John Binns | 1,425 | 0.10% | ▼0.08 |
| Majority | | | | |
| Turnout | | | | |
| Republican hold | | Swing | | |
