= Ralph A. Villani =

American politician

33rd Mayor of Newark
- In office 1949–1953
- Preceded by: Vincent J. Murphy
- Succeeded by: Leo P. Carlin

Personal details
- Born: September 11, 1901; Elizabeth, New Jersey
- Died: February 28, 1974 (aged 72); Norwood, New Jersey
- Political party: Republican

Ralph A. Villani (September 11, 1901 – February 28, 1974) served as Mayor of Newark, New Jersey from 1949 to 1953. To date he is the last elected mayor of Newark from the Republican party.

== Biography ==
Villani was born in Elizabeth, New Jersey on September 11, 1901, the eldest child of Anna and Carmine Villani. His parents were Italian immigrants who arrived in the United States in 1898.

On Tuesday, May 17, 1949 Villani was named Mayor of Newark by his fellow City Commissioners.

In 1953, a grand jury charged that Mayor Villani and other officials in the Department of Parks and Public Property, of which he served as director, had received money from employees "as salary kickbacks or payment for promotions." That May, Mayor Villani and fellow City Commissioner Stephen Moran lost their respective bids for re-election. Villani was replaced as mayor by independent candidate Leo P. Carlin.

Villani died on February 28, 1974, after suffering a heart attack at his home. He was 72 years old.

Political offices
Preceded by Vincent J. Murphy	Mayor of Newark; 1949–1953	Succeeded by Leo P. Carlin
