= Leo P. Carlin =

American politician (1908–1999)

- Born: August 12, 1908; Newark, New Jersey
- Died: December 17, 1999 (aged 91); Avon-by-the-Sea, New Jersey
- Spouse: Margaret Gallagher (c. 1910-1999) (m. 1948)

Leo P. Carlin (August 12, 1908 – December 17, 1999) was the Democratic Mayor of Newark, New Jersey from 1953 to 1962.

== Biography ==
Carlin was born on August 12, 1908, in Newark, New Jersey to Hugh Carlin and Annie Duffy. He was one of 22 children that his father had with two wives. He attended Saint Benedict's Preparatory School, but left before graduating, in order to go to work to help support his family. Prior to his election as mayor, he served on the New Jersey General Assembly, as president of Newark's Board of Education, and as the longtime president of Local 478 of the Brotherhood of Teamsters and Chauffeurs.

The only one of the few mayors since 1962 to leave office with a positive balance in Newark's budget, one of the major contributions Carlin made was to address the CEOs of Newark's 18 largest corporations in an effort to stem the outward movement of companies to the suburbs. The Star-Ledger wrote:

The term New Newark came into existence in 1954, largely as a result of the recently elected Mayor Leo Carlin, who called together the CEOs of Newark's 18 largest corporations in an effort to stem the outward movement of companies to the suburbs. At first, the organization was composed exclusively of business leaders who met quarterly. One of its best-known chairs was David Yunich, president of Bamberger's. ... But as time passed, the organization expanded to encompass the Newark Economic Development Committee. It was made up of representatives not only from business, but also labor and government, and better represented the whole community. One of its recommendations called for the redevelopment of the area adjoining Pennsylvania Station.

He died on December 17, 1999, in Avon-by-the-Sea, New Jersey, aged 91.

== See also ==
- List of mayors of Newark, New Jersey

Political offices
Preceded by Ralph A. Villani	Mayor of Newark; 1953–1962	Succeeded by Hugh Joseph Addonizio
