= Chestnut Ridge, Indiana =

Unincorporated community in Indiana, U.S.

Coordinates: 38°53′19″N 85°51′37″W

Chestnut Ridge is an unincorporated community in Jackson County, Indiana, in the United States.

== History ==
A post office was established at Chestnut Ridge in 1878. Renamed Chestnut in 1894, the post office was discontinued in 1902.
