= Meyer C. Ellenstein =

American politician

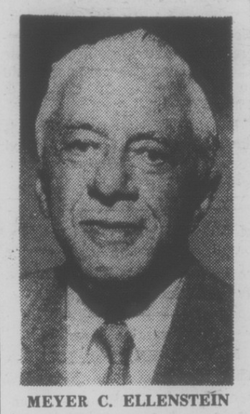

31st Mayor of Newark
- In office 1933–1941
- Preceded by: Jerome T. Congleton
- Succeeded by: Vincent J. Murphy

Personal details
- Born: October 15, 1886 New York City, New York
- Died: February 11, 1967 (aged 80) White Plains, New York
- Party: Democratic

Meyer C. Ellenstein (October 15, 1886 – February 11, 1967) served as mayor of Newark, New Jersey from 1933 to 1941.

== Biography ==
Ellenstein was born in New York City on October 15, 1886, the son of Jewish parents Max Ellenstein and Libby Bzuroff.

Ellenstein assumed the office as mayor of Newark in 1933. He was a vocal critic of New York City Mayor LaGuardia's attempt to expand North Beach Airport (later known as LaGuardia Airport) for commercial flights.

Ellenstein was a Dentist, a lawyer, police commissioner and city councellman before becoming mayor.

Ellenstein's wife was one of three survivors of a TWA airplane crash in rural Pennsylvania in April 1936.

Phillip Roth references Mayor Ellenstein in numerous of his books - including The Plot Against America in which Ellenstein is a character.

He died on February 11, 1967.

He was the father of actor Robert Ellenstein.

Political offices
Preceded by Jerome T. Congleton	Mayor of Newark; 1933–41	Succeeded by Vincent J. Murphy
