= 1916 United States Senate elections =

- November 7, 1916 (Note: September 11, 1916 in Maine)
- Class 1

35 of the 96 seats in the United States Senate 49 seats needed for a majority
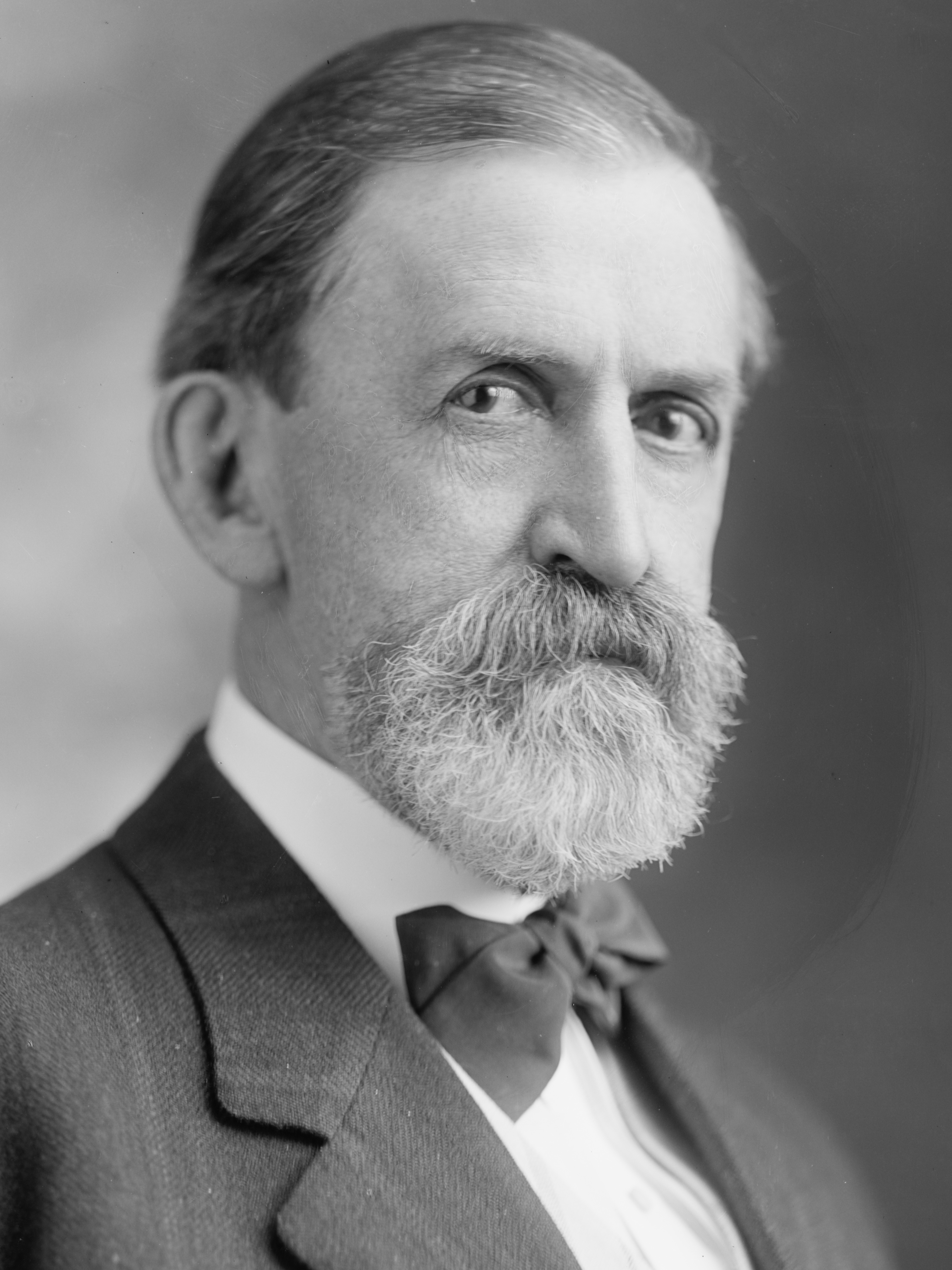

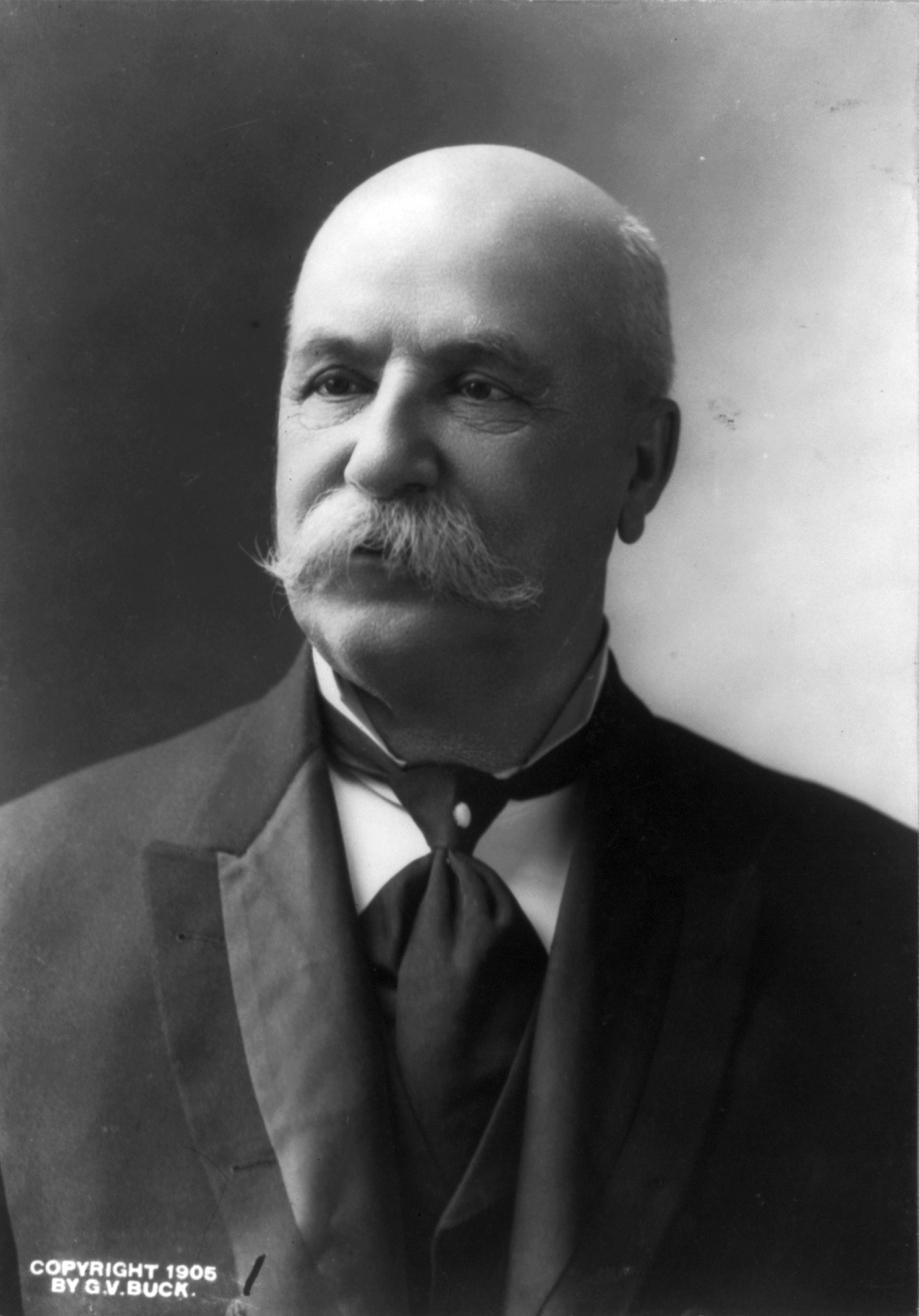
	Majority party	Minority party
Leader	John W. Kern (Note: as Democratic Conference Chairman) (lost re-election)	Jacob H. Gallinger (Note: as Republican Conference Chairman)
Party	Democratic	Republican
Leader since	March 4, 1911	March 4, 1911
Leader's seat	Indiana	New Hampshire
Seats before	56	40
Seats won	17	18
Seats after	54	42
Seat change	▼2	▲2
Seats up	19	16
- Results of the elections: Democratic gain Democratic hold Republican gain Republican hold No election
Majority conference chairman before election
John W. Kern
Democratic
Elected Majority conference chairman
Thomas S. Martin
Democratic

The 1916 United States Senate elections were elections that coincided with the re-election of President Woodrow Wilson. This was the first election since the enactment of the Seventeenth Amendment in 1913 that all 32 Class 1 senators were selected by direct or popular elections instead of state legislatures. Republicans gained a net of two seats from the Democrats, and then an additional two seats through midterm vacancies, thereby reducing Democrats to a 52–44 majority.

This marks the last time until 2026 where the Democrats won a Senate majority without holding either seat in West Virginia.

== Gains, losses, and holds ==
=== Retirements ===
Four Republicans and two Democrats retired instead of seeking re-election.

State	Senator	Replaced by
Arkansas	James P. Clarke	William F. Kirby
California	John D. Works	Hiram Johnson
Maine (special)	Edwin C. Burleigh	Bert M. Fernald
New Mexico	Thomas B. Catron	Andrieus A. Jones
New York	James A. O'Gorman	William M. Calder
Pennsylvania	George T. Oliver	Philander C. Knox

=== Defeats ===
Nine Democrats and five Republicans sought re-election but lost in the primary or general election.

State	Senator	Replaced by
Delaware	Henry A. du Pont	Josiah O. Wolcott
Florida	Nathan P. Bryan	Park Trammell
Indiana (special)	Thomas Taggart	James E. Watson
Indiana	John W. Kern	Harry S. New
Maine	Charles F. Johnson	Frederick Hale
Maryland	Blair Lee I	Joseph I. France
Minnesota	Moses E. Clapp	Frank B. Kellogg
New Jersey	James E. Martine	Joseph S. Frelinghuysen
Rhode Island	Henry F. Lippitt	Peter G. Gerry
Tennessee	Luke Lea	Kenneth McKellar
Utah	George Sutherland	William H. King
West Virginia	William E. Chilton	Howard Sutherland
Wyoming	Clarence D. Clark	John B. Kendrick

=== Post-election changes ===
Eight Democrats and two Republicans died during the 65th Congress, and initially were all replaced by appointees except in Wisconsin. In Wisconsin, Democratic Senator Paul O. Husting died on October 21, 1917, and his seat remained vacant until an April 1918 election.

State	Senator	Replaced by
Idaho (Class 3)	James H. Brady	John F. Nugent
Kentucky (Class 2)	Ollie Murray James	George B. Martin
Louisiana (Class 3)	Robert F. Broussard	Walter Guion
Missouri (Class 3)	William J. Stone	Xenophon P. Wilfley
Nevada (Class 3)	Francis G. Newlands	Charles Henderson
New Hampshire (Class 3)	Jacob H. Gallinger	Irving W. Drew
New Jersey (Class 2)	William Hughes	David Baird Sr.
Oregon (Class 2)	Harry Lane	Charles L. McNary
South Carolina (Class 2)	Benjamin Tillman	Christie Benet
Wisconsin (Class 3)	Paul O. Husting	Irvine Lenroot

== Change in composition ==
=== Before the elections ===
		D_{1}	D_{2}	D_{3}	D_{4}	D_{5}	D_{6}	D_{7}	D_{8}
D_{18}	D_{17}	D_{16}	D_{15}	D_{14}	D_{13}	D_{12}	D_{11}	D_{10}	D_{9}
D_{19}	D_{20}	D_{21}	D_{22}	D_{23}	D_{24}	D_{25}	D_{26}	D_{27}	D_{28}
D_{38} Ariz. Ran	D_{37}	D_{36}	D_{35}	D_{34}	D_{33}	D_{32}	D_{31}	D_{30}	D_{29}
D_{39} Ark. (sp); Died	D_{40} Ind. (sp); Ran	D_{41} Fla. Ran	D_{42} Ind. (reg); Ran	D_{43} Maine (reg); Ran	D_{44} Md. Ran	D_{45} Miss. Ran	D_{46} Mo. Ran	D_{47} Mont. Ran	D_{48} Neb. Ran
Majority →									D_{49} Nev. Ran
R_{39} Wis. Ran	R_{40} Wyo. Ran	D_{56} W.Va. Ran	D_{55} Va. Ran	D_{54} Texas; Ran	D_{53} Tenn. Ran	D_{52} Ohio; Ran	D_{51} N.Y. Retired	D_{50} N.J. Ran	D_{49} Nev. Ran
R_{38} Wash. Ran	R_{37} Vt. Ran	R_{36} Utah; Ran	R_{35} R.I. Ran	R_{34} Pa. Retired	R_{33} N.D. Ran	R_{32} N.M. Retired	R_{31} Minn. Ran	R_{30} Mich. Ran	R_{29} Mass. Ran
R_{19}	R_{20}	R_{21}	R_{22}	R_{23}	R_{24}	R_{25} Calif. Retired	R_{26} Conn. Ran	R_{27} Del. Ran	R_{28} Maine (sp); Died
R_{18}	R_{17}	R_{16}	R_{15}	R_{14}	R_{13}	R_{12}	R_{11}	R_{10}	R_{9}
		R_{1}	R_{2}	R_{3}	R_{4}	R_{5}	R_{6}	R_{7}	R_{8}

=== Elections results ===
		D_{1}	D_{2}	D_{3}	D_{4}	D_{5}	D_{6}	D_{7}	D_{8}
D_{18}	D_{17}	D_{16}	D_{15}	D_{14}	D_{13}	D_{12}	D_{11}	D_{10}	D_{9}
D_{19}	D_{20}	D_{21}	D_{22}	D_{23}	D_{24}	D_{25}	D_{26}	D_{27}	D_{28}
D_{38} Ariz. Re-elected	D_{37}	D_{36}	D_{35}	D_{34}	D_{33}	D_{32}	D_{31}	D_{30}	D_{29}
D_{39} Ark. (sp); Hold	D_{40} Del. Gain	D_{41} Fla. Hold	D_{42} Miss. Re-elected	D_{43} Mo. Re-elected	D_{44} Mont. Re-elected	D_{45} Neb. Re-elected	D_{46} Nev. Re-elected	D_{47} N.M. Gain	D_{48} Ohio; Re-elected
Majority →									D_{49} R.I. Gain
R_{39} Vt. Re-elected	R_{40} Wash. Re-elected	R_{41} W.Va. Gain	R_{42} Wis. Re-elected	D_{54} Wyo. Gain	D_{53} Va. Re-elected	D_{52} Utah; Gain	D_{51} Texas; Re-elected	D_{50} Tenn. Hold	D_{49} R.I. Gain
R_{38} Pa. Hold	R_{37} N.D. Re-elected	R_{36} N.Y. Gain	R_{35} N.J. Gain	R_{34} Minn. Hold	R_{33} Mich. Re-elected	R_{32} Mass. Re-elected	R_{31} Md. Gain	R_{30} Maine (sp); Hold	R_{29} Maine (reg); Gain
R_{19}	R_{20}	R_{21}	R_{22}	R_{23}	R_{24}	R_{25} Calif. Hold	R_{26} Conn. Re-elected	R_{27} Ind. (reg); Gain	R_{28} Ind. (sp); Gain (Note: Appointee defeated)
R_{18}	R_{17}	R_{16}	R_{15}	R_{14}	R_{13}	R_{12}	R_{11}	R_{10}	R_{9}
		R_{1}	R_{2}	R_{3}	R_{4}	R_{5}	R_{6}	R_{7}	R_{8}

Key	D_{#} / Democratic; R_{#} / Republican

== Race summaries ==
=== Special elections during the 64th Congress ===
In these special elections, the winner was seated during 1916 or before March 4, 1917; ordered by election date.

State	Incumbent			Results	Candidates
State	Senator	Party	Electoral history	Results	Candidates
Maine (Class 2)	Edwin C. Burleigh	Republican	1913	Incumbent died June 16, 1916. A new senator elected September 11, 1916. Republican hold.	▌ ✓ Bert M. Fernald (Republican) 54.28%; ▌Kenneth C. M. Sills (Democratic) 45.49%; ▌Frederick Shepherd (Prohibition) 0.23%
Arkansas (Class 3)	James P. Clarke	Democratic	1903; 1909; 1914	Incumbent died October 1, 1916. New senator elected November 7, 1916. Democratic hold.	▌ ✓ William F. Kirby (Democratic) 69.27%; ▌Harmon L. Remmel (Republican) 30.73%
Indiana (Class 3)	Thomas Taggart	Democratic	1916 (appointed)	Interim appointee lost election to finish term. New senator elected November 7, 1916. Republican gain.	▌ ✓ James E. Watson (Republican) 47.66%; ▌Thomas Taggart (Democratic) 46.29%; ▌Edward Henry (Socialist) 3.08%; Others: ▌William H. Hickman (Prohibition) 2.29%; ▌John F. Clifford (Progressive) 0.68%

=== Elections leading to the 65th Congress ===
In these general elections, the winners were elected for the term beginning March 4, 1917; ordered by state.

All of the elections involved the Class 1 seats.

State	Incumbent			Results	Candidates
State	Senator	Party	Electoral history	Results	Candidates
Arizona	Henry F. Ashurst	Democratic	1912 (new state)	Incumbent re-elected.	▌ ✓ Henry F. Ashurst (Democratic) 55.36%; ▌Joseph Henry Kibbey (Republican) 39.4%; ▌W. S. Bradford (Socialist) 5.24%
California	John D. Works	Republican	1911	Incumbent retired. New senator elected. Republican hold.	▌ ✓ Hiram Johnson (Republican) 61.09%; ▌George S. Patton (Democratic) 29.54%; ▌Walter Thomas Mills (Socialist) 5.25%; ▌Marshall Atwood (Prohibition) 4.12%
Connecticut	George P. McLean	Republican	1911	Incumbent re-elected.	▌ ✓ George P. McLean (Republican) 50.17%; ▌Homer Stille Cummings (Democratic) 46.24%; Others: ▌Martin Plunkett (Socialist) 2.48%; ▌Wilbur Manchester (Prohibition) 0.83%; ▌Otto Ruckser (Socialist Labor) 0.29%
Delaware	Henry A. du Pont	Republican	1906 (special); 1911	Incumbent lost re-election. New senator elected. Democratic gain.	▌ ✓ Josiah O. Wolcott (Democratic) 49.67%; ▌Henry A. du Pont (Republican) 44.77%; ▌Hiram A. Burton (Progressive) 4.61%; ▌William C. Ferris (Socialist) 0.96%
Florida	Nathan P. Bryan	Democratic	1911 (appointed); 1911 (late)	Incumbent lost renomination. New senator elected. Democratic hold.	▌ ✓ Park Trammell (Democratic) 82.86%; ▌William O'Neal (Republican) 12.45%; ▌R. L. Goodwin (Socialist) 4.69%
Indiana	John W. Kern	Democratic	1911	Incumbent lost re-election. New senator elected. Republican gain.	▌ ✓ Harry S. New (Republican) 47.77%; ▌John W. Kern (Democratic) 46.14%; ▌Joseph Zimmerman (Socialist) 3.06%; Others: ▌Elwood Haynes (Prohibition) 2.21%; ▌John N. Dyer (Progressive) 0.61%; ▌Ira Decker (Socialist Labor) 0.22%
Maine	Charles F. Johnson	Democratic	1911	Incumbent lost re-election. New senator elected September 11, 1916. Republican gain.	▌ ✓ Frederick Hale (Republican) 52.72%; ▌Charles F. Johnson (Democratic) 46.09%; Others: ▌James F. Carey (Socialist) 1.0%; ▌Arthur C. Jackson (Prohibition) 0.19%
Maryland	Blair Lee I	Democratic	1913 (special)	Incumbent lost renomination. New senator elected. Republican gain.	▌ ✓ Joseph I. France (Republican) 49.32%; ▌David John Lewis (Democratic) 47.62%; Others: ▌James Frizzell (Prohibition) 1.44%; ▌Sylvester Young (Socialist) 1.12%; ▌Frank Lang (Labor) 0.5%
Massachusetts	Henry Cabot Lodge	Republican	1893; 1899; 1905; 1911	Incumbent re-elected	▌ ✓ Henry Cabot Lodge (Republican) 51.68%; ▌John F. Fitzgerald (Democratic) 45.31%; ▌William N. McDonald (Socialist) 3.01%
Michigan	Charles E. Townsend	Republican	1911	Incumbent re-elected.	▌ ✓ Charles E. Townsend (Republican) 56.34%; ▌Lawrence Price (Democratic) 39.85%; Others: ▌E. O. Foss (Socialist) 2.41%; ▌John Y. Johnston (Prohibition) 1.17%; ▌Herman Richter (Socialist Labor) 0.14%
Minnesota	Moses E. Clapp	Republican	1901 (special); 1905; 1911	Incumbent lost renomination. New senator elected. Republican hold.	▌ ✓ Frank B. Kellogg (Republican) 48.58%; ▌Daniel W. Lawler (Democratic) 30.84%; ▌Willis G. Calderwood (Prohibition) 20.58%
Mississippi	John Sharp Williams	Democratic	1908 (early)	Incumbent re-elected.	▌ ✓ John Sharp Williams (Democratic); Unopposed
Missouri	James A. Reed	Democratic	1911	Incumbent re-elected.	▌ ✓ James A. Reed (Democratic) 50.56%; ▌Walter S. Dickey (Republican) 47.44%; Others: ▌Kate Richards O'Hare (Socialist) 1.87%; ▌Joseph Scheidler (Socialist Labor) 0.12%
Montana	Henry L. Myers	Democratic	1911	Incumbent re-elected.	▌ ✓ Henry L. Myers (Democratic) 51.06%; ▌Charles Nelson Pray (Republican) 43.40%; ▌Henry La Beau (Socialist) 5.54%
Nebraska	Gilbert Hitchcock	Democratic	1911	Incumbent re-elected.	▌ ✓ Gilbert Hitchcock (Democratic) 49.98%; ▌John L. Kennedy (Republican) 45.88%; ▌E. E. Olmstead (Socialist) 2.59%; ▌D. B. Gilbert (Prohibition) 1.55%
Nevada	Key Pittman	Democratic	1913 (special)	Incumbent re-elected.	▌ ✓ Key Pittman (Democratic) 38.81%; ▌Samuel Platt (Republican) 32.28%; ▌Ashley G. Miller (Socialist) 28.91%
New Jersey	James E. Martine	Democratic	1911	Incumbent lost re-election. New senator elected. Republican gain.	▌ ✓ Joseph S. Frelinghuysen (Republican) 55.99%; ▌James E. Martine (Democratic) 38.9%; ▌William C. Doughty (Socialist) 3.06%; Others: ▌Livingston Barbour (Prohibition) 1.64%; ▌Rudolph Katz (Socialist Labor) 0.42%
New Mexico	Thomas B. Catron	Republican	1912 (new state)	Incumbent retired. New senator elected. Democratic gain.	▌ ✓ Andrieus A. Jones (Democratic) 51.01%; ▌Frank Hubbell (Republican) 45.95%; ▌W. P. Metcalf (Socialist) 3.04%
New York	James A. O'Gorman	Democratic	1911	Incumbent retired. New senator elected. Republican gain.	▌ ✓ William M. Calder (Republican) 54.32%; ▌William F. McCombs (Democratic) 39.22%; ▌Joseph Cannon (Socialist) 3.96%; Others: ▌D. Leigh Colvin (Prohibition) 1.25%; ▌Bainbridge Colby (Progressive) 0.99%; ▌August Gillhaus (Socialist Labor) 0.26%
North Dakota	Porter J. McCumber	Republican	1911	Incumbent re-elected.	▌ ✓ Porter J. McCumber (Republican) 53.85%; ▌John Burke (Democratic) 38.24%; ▌E. R. Fry (Socialist) 7.91%
Ohio	Atlee Pomerene	Democratic	1911	Incumbent re-elected.	▌ ✓ Atlee Pomerene (Democratic) 49.26%; ▌Myron T. Herrick (Republican) 46.15%; ▌C. E. Ruthenberg (Socialist) 3.29%; Others: ▌Aaron S. Watkins (Prohibition) 1.04%; ▌Jacob S. Coxey Sr. (Independent) 0.26%
Pennsylvania	George T. Oliver	Republican	1909 (special); 1911	Incumbent retired. New senator elected. Republican hold.	▌ ✓ Philander C. Knox (Republican) 56.31%; ▌Ellis Orvis (Democratic) 37.25%; ▌Charles Ervin (Socialist) 3.76%; Others: ▌Herbert T. Ames (Prohibition) 2.49%; ▌Robert C. Macauley (Single Tax) 0.12%
Rhode Island	Henry F. Lippitt	Republican	1911	Incumbent lost re-election. New senator elected. Democratic gain.	▌ ✓ Peter G. Gerry (Democratic) 52.94%; ▌Henry F. Lippitt (Republican) 44.12%; Others: ▌Frederick Hurst (Socialist) 2.25%; ▌Frank J. Sibley (Prohibition) 0.51%; ▌Peter McDermott (Socialist Labor) 0.19%
Tennessee	Luke Lea	Democratic	1911	Incumbent lost renomination. New senator elected. Democratic hold.	▌ ✓ Kenneth McKellar (Democratic) 54.42%; ▌Ben W. Hooper (Republican) 44.75%; ▌H. H. Mangum (Socialist) 0.83%
Texas	Charles A. Culberson	Democratic	1899; 1905; 1911	Incumbent re-elected.	▌ ✓ Charles A. Culberson (Democratic) 81.3%; ▌Alex W. Atcheson (Republican) 13.09%; ▌Thomas. A. Hickey (Socialist) 4.99%; ▌Edward. H. Conibear (Prohibition) 0.62%
Utah	George Sutherland	Republican	1905; 1911	Incumbent lost re-election. New senator elected. Democratic gain.	▌ ✓ William H. King (Democratic) 56.92%; ▌George Sutherland (Republican) 39.93%; ▌Christian Poulson (Socialist) 3.16%
Vermont	Carroll S. Page	Republican	1908 (special); 1910	Incumbent re-elected.	▌ ✓ Carroll S. Page (Republican) 74.41%; ▌Oscar C. Miller (Democratic) 23.5%; ▌Norman Greenslet (Socialist) 2.1%
Virginia	Claude A. Swanson	Democratic	1910 (appointed); 1911 (appointed); 1912 (special)	Incumbent re-elected.	▌ ✓ Claude A. Swanson (Democratic); Unopposed
Washington	Miles Poindexter	Republican	1911	Incumbent re-elected.	▌ ✓ Miles Poindexter (Republican) 55.39%; ▌George Turner (Democratic) 37.06%; ▌Bruce Rogers (Socialist) 5.95%; Others: ▌Joseph Campbell (Prohibition) 1.21%; ▌Walter J. Thompson (Progressive) 0.4%
West Virginia	William E. Chilton	Democratic	1911	Incumbent lost re-election. New senator elected. Republican gain.	▌ ✓ Howard Sutherland (Republican) 50.14%; ▌William E. Chilton (Democratic) 48.17%; ▌G. A. Gneiser (Socialist) 1.7%
Wisconsin	Robert M. La Follette	Republican	1905; 1911	Incumbent re-elected.	▌ ✓ Robert M. La Follette (Republican) 59.23%; ▌William F. Wolfe (Democratic) 31.9%; ▌Richard Elsner (Socialist) 6.85%; ▌Charles L. Hill (Prohibition) 2.02%
Wyoming	Clarence D. Clark	Republican	1911	Incumbent lost re-election. New senator elected. Democratic gain.	▌ ✓ John B. Kendrick (Democratic) 51.47%; ▌Clarence D. Clark (Republican) 45.47%; ▌Paul Paulsen (Socialist) 2.61%; ▌Arthur B. Campbell (Prohibition) 0.45%

== Closest races ==
Eighteen races had a margin of victory under 10%:

State	Party of winner	Margin
Indiana (special)	Republican (flip)	1.37%
Indiana	Republican (flip)	1.63%
Maryland	Republican (flip)	1.7%
West Virginia	Republican (flip)	1.97%
Missouri	Democratic	3.12%
Ohio	Democratic	3.14%
Connecticut	Republican	3.93%
Nebraska	Democratic	4.1%
Delaware	Democratic (flip)	4.9%
New Mexico	Democratic (flip)	5.06%
Wyoming	Democratic (flip)	6.0%
Massachusetts	Republican	6.37%
Nevada	Democratic	6.53% (Note: Nevada was the "tipping-point state".)
Maine	Republican (flip)	6.63%
Montana	Democratic	7.66%
Maine (special)	Republican	8.79%
Rhode Island	Democratic (flip)	8.82%
Tennessee	Democratic	9.67%

== Arizona ==
1916 United States Senate elections in Arizona
- November 7, 1916
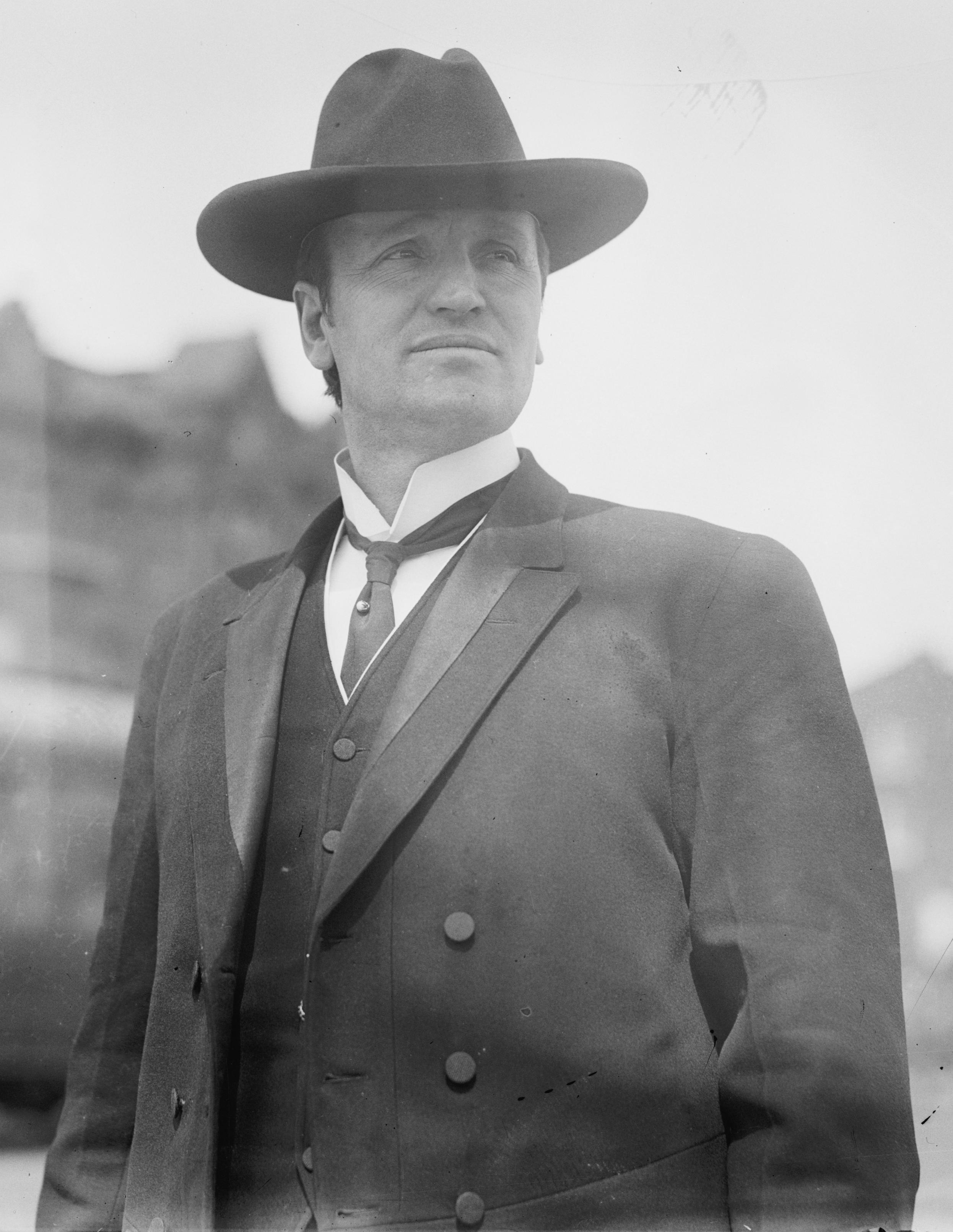

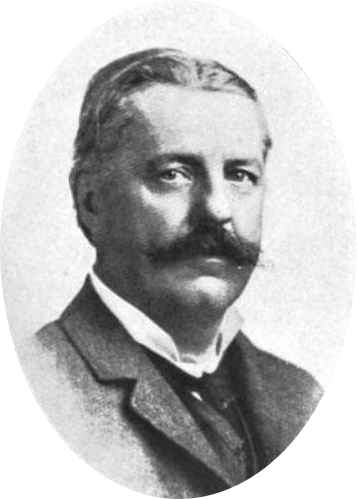
Nominee	Henry F. Ashurst	Joseph Henry Kibbey
Party	Democratic	Republican
Popular vote	29,873	21,261
Percentage	55.4%	39.4%
Nominee	W. S. Bradford
Party	Socialist
Popular vote	2,827
Percentage	5.2%
- County results Ashurst: 40–50% 50–60% 60–70% Kibbey: 50–60%
U.S. senator before election
Henry F. Ashurst
Democratic
Elected U.S. senator
Henry F. Ashurst
Democratic

Arizona election
Party	Candidate	Votes	%
Democratic	Henry F. Ashurst (incumbent)	29,873	55.36
Republican	Joseph Henry Kibbey	21,261	39.40
Socialist	W. S. Bradford	2,827	5.24
Majority		8,612	15.96
Total votes		53,961	100.00
Democratic hold			

== Arkansas (special) ==
1916 United States Senate special election in Arkansas
- November 7, 1916
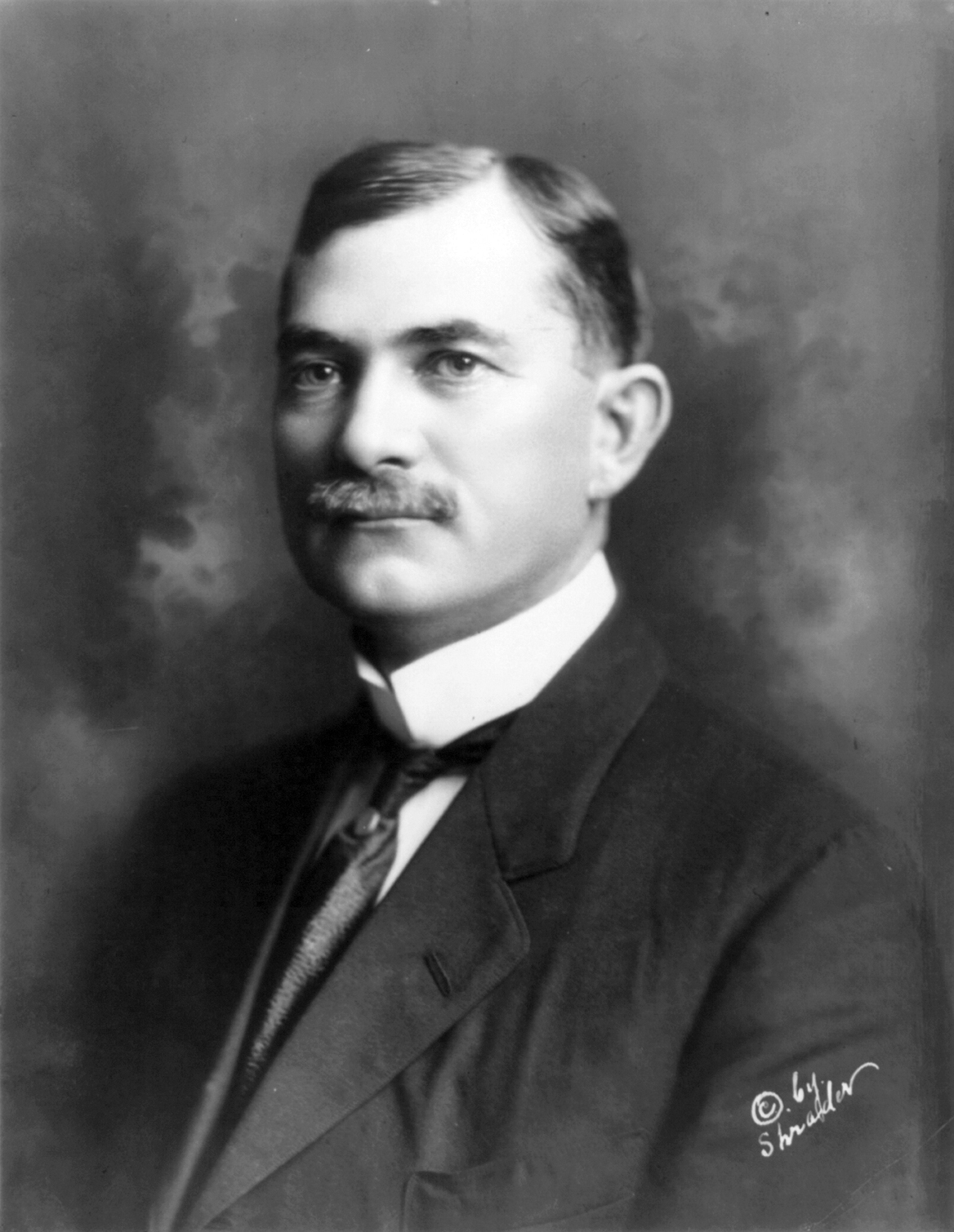

Nominee	William F. Kirby	Harmon L. Remmel
Party	Democratic	Republican
Popular vote	110,293	48,922
Percentage	69.27%	30.73%
- County results Kirby: 50–60% 60–70% 70–80% 80–90% Remmel: 50–60% 60–70%
U.S. senator before election
James Paul Clarke
Democratic
Elected U.S. senator
William F. Kirby
Democratic

Three-term Democratic Senate President pro tempore James Paul Clarke died on October 1, 1916.

Democrat William F. Kirby was elected on November 7, 1916, to finish the term. He served only the rest of this term, losing renomination in 1920.

Arkansas special election
Party	Candidate	Votes	%
Democratic	William F. Kirby	110,293	69.27
Republican	Harmon L. Remmel	48,922	30.73
Majority		61,371	38.55
Total votes		159,215	100.00
Democratic hold			

== California ==
1916 United States Senate election in California
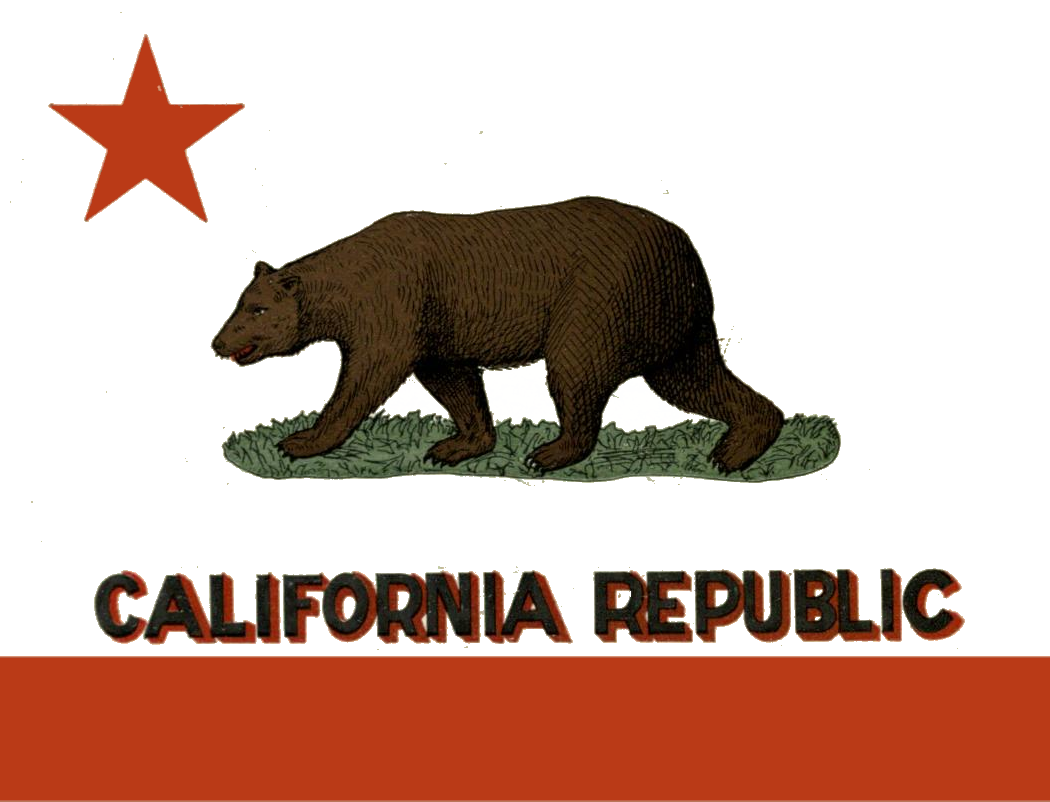
- November 7, 1916
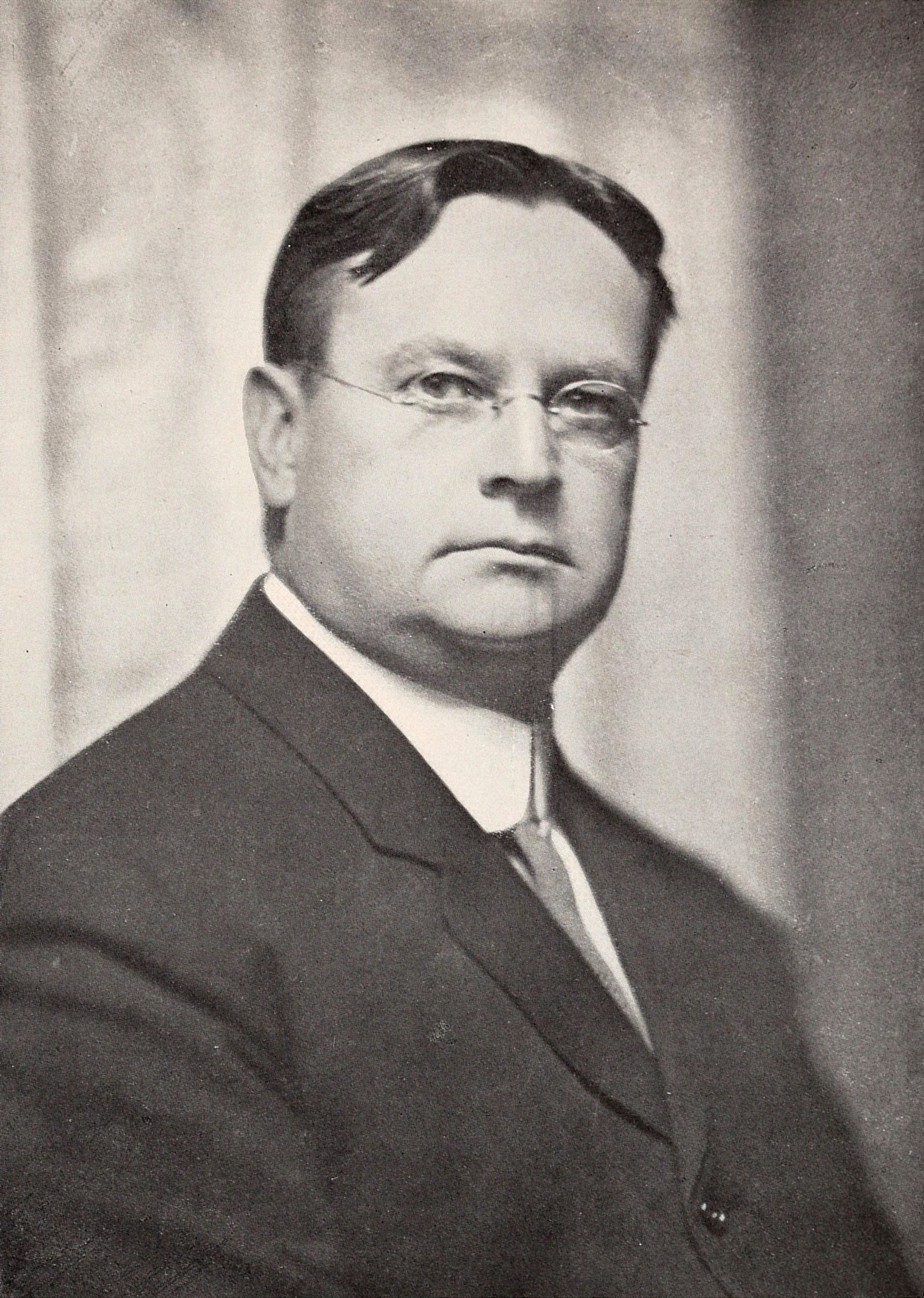

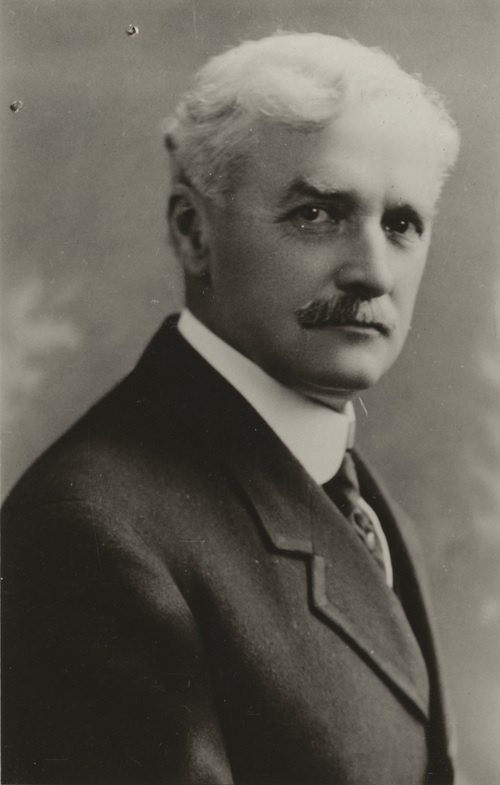

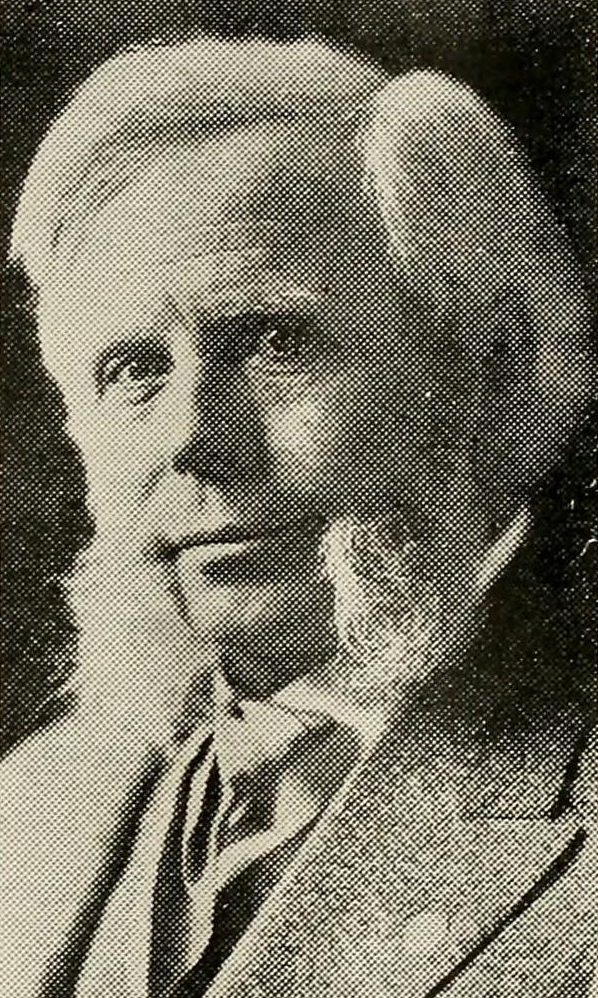
Nominee	Hiram Johnson	George S. Patton	Walter Thomas Mills
Party	Republican	Democratic	Socialist
Alliance	Progressive
Popular vote	574,667	277,852	49,341
Percentage	61.09%	29.54%	5.25%
- County results Johnson: 40–50% 50–60% 60–70% 70–80% Patton: 40–50% 50–60%
U.S. senator before election
John Downey Works
Republican
Elected U.S. Senator
Hiram Johnson
Republican

1916 United States Senate election in California
Party	Candidate	Votes	%
Republican	Hiram Johnson	574,667	61.09%
Democratic	George S. Patton	277,852	29.54%
Socialist	Walter Thomas Mills	49,341	5.25%
Prohibition	Marshall W. Atwood	38,797	4.12%
Total votes		907,900	100.00%

== Connecticut ==
1916 United States Senate election in Connecticut
- November 7, 1916
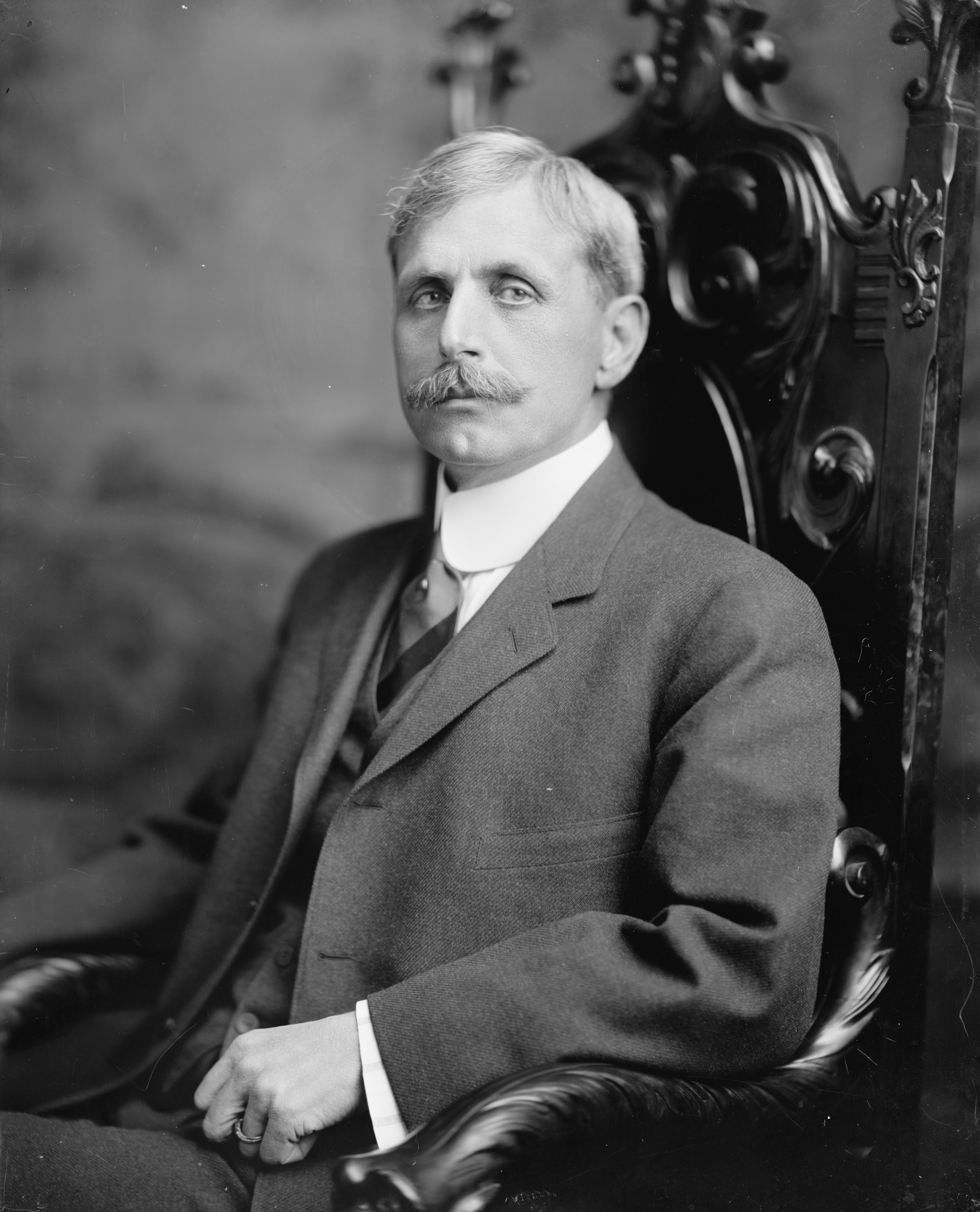

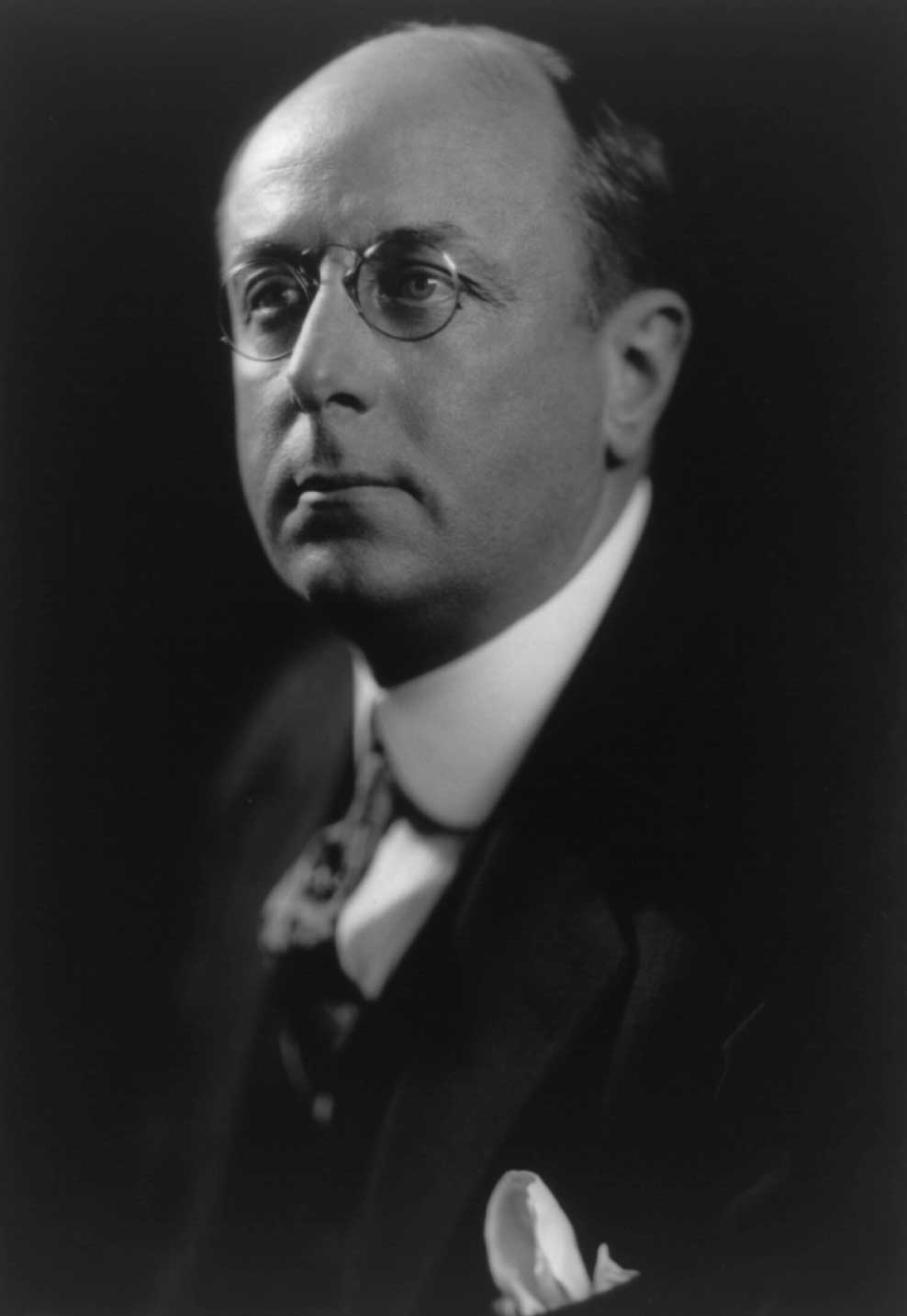
Nominee	George P. McLean	Homer Stille Cummings
Party	Republican	Democratic
Popular vote	107,020	98,649
Percentage	50.17%	46.24%
- McLean: 40–50% 50–60% 60–70% 70–80% 80–90% Cummings: 40–50% 50–60% 60–70%
U.S. senator before election
George P. McLean
Republican
Elected U.S. Senator
George P. McLean
Republican

1916 U.S. Senate election in Connecticut
Party	Candidate	Votes	%
Republican	George P. McLean (inc.)	107,020	50.17%
Democratic	Homer Stille Cummings	98,649	46.24%
Socialist	Martin F. Plunkett	5,279	2.48%
Prohibition	Wilbur G. Manchester	1,768	0.83%
Socialist Labor	Otto Ruckser	619	0.29%
Total votes		213,335	100.00%
Republican hold			

== Delaware ==
1916 United States Senate election in Delaware
- November 7, 1916
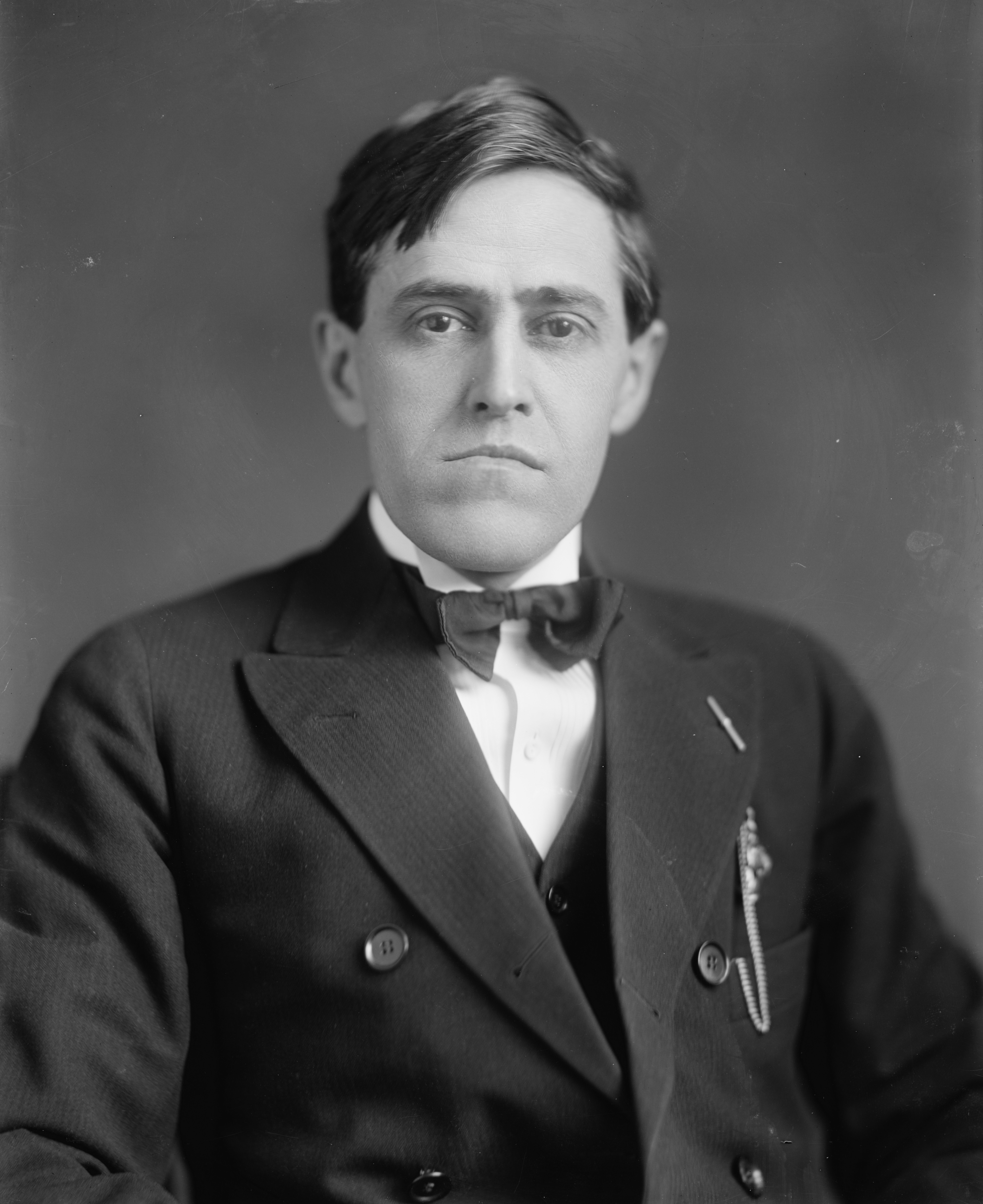

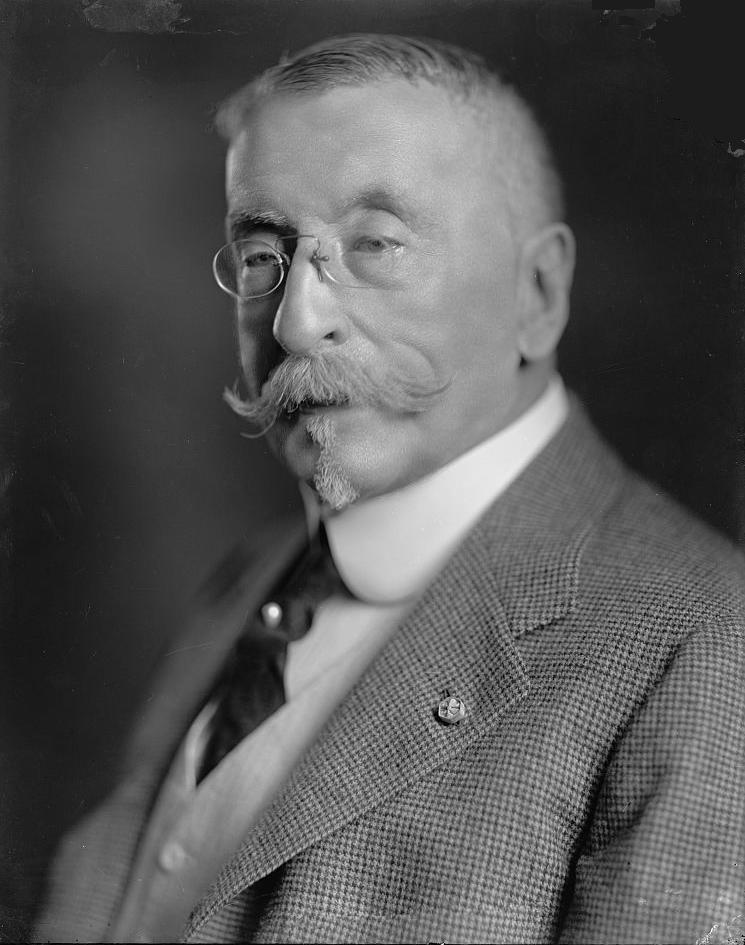
Nominee	Josiah O. Wolcott	Henry A. du Pont
Party	Democratic	Republican
Popular vote	25,434	22,925
Percentage	49.67%	44.77%
- County results Wolcott: 40–50% 50–60%
U.S. senator before election
Henry A. du Pont
Republican
Elected U.S. Senator
Josiah O. Wolcott
Democratic

1916 U.S. Senate election in Delaware
Party	Candidate	Votes	%
Democratic	Josiah O. Wolcott	25,434	49.67%
Republican	Henry A. du Pont (incumbent)	22,925	44.77%
Progressive	Hiram R. Burton	2,361	4.61%
Socialist	William C. Ferris	490	0.96%
Total votes		51,210	100.00%
Democratic gain from Republican			

== Florida ==
1916 United States Senate election in Florida
- November 7, 1916
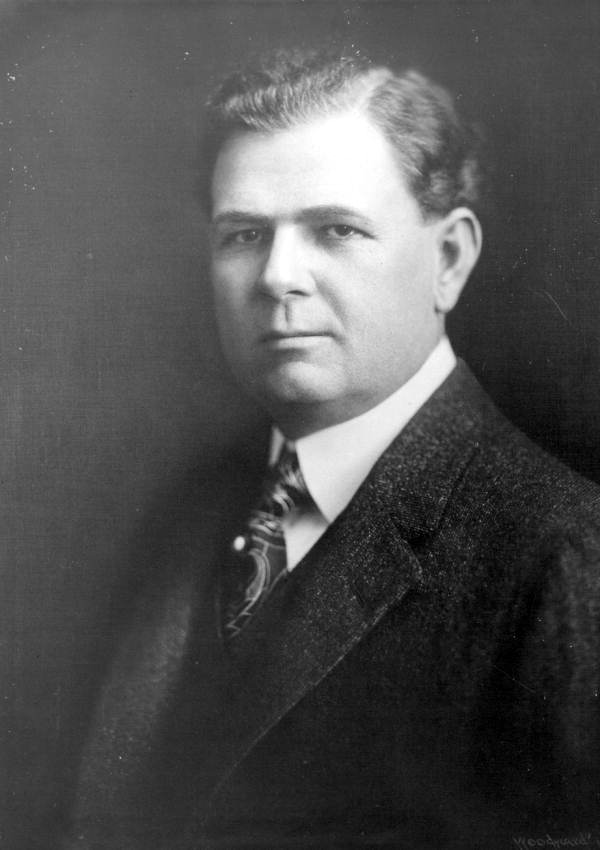

Nominee	Park Trammell	William R. O'Neal
Party	Democratic	Republican
Popular vote	58,391	8,774
Percentage	82.86%	12.45%
- County results Trammell: 60–70% 70–80% 80–90% >90%
U.S. senator before election
Nathan Philemon Bryan
Democratic
Elected U.S. Senator
Park Trammell
Democratic

1916 U.S. Senate election in Florida
Party	Candidate	Votes	%
Democratic	Park Trammell	58,391	82.86%
Republican	William R. O'Neal	8,774	12.45%
Socialist	R. L. Goodwin	3,304	4.69%
Total votes		70,469	100.00%

== Indiana ==
There were two elections held on November 7, 1916, due to a vacancy. The elections converted both seats from Democratic to Republican, thus marking the first time since the popular-election of senators was mandated by the Seventeenth Amendment three years earlier that both Senate seats in a state flipped from one party to the other in a single election cycle.

=== Indiana (special) ===
1916 United States Senate special election in Indiana
- November 7, 1916
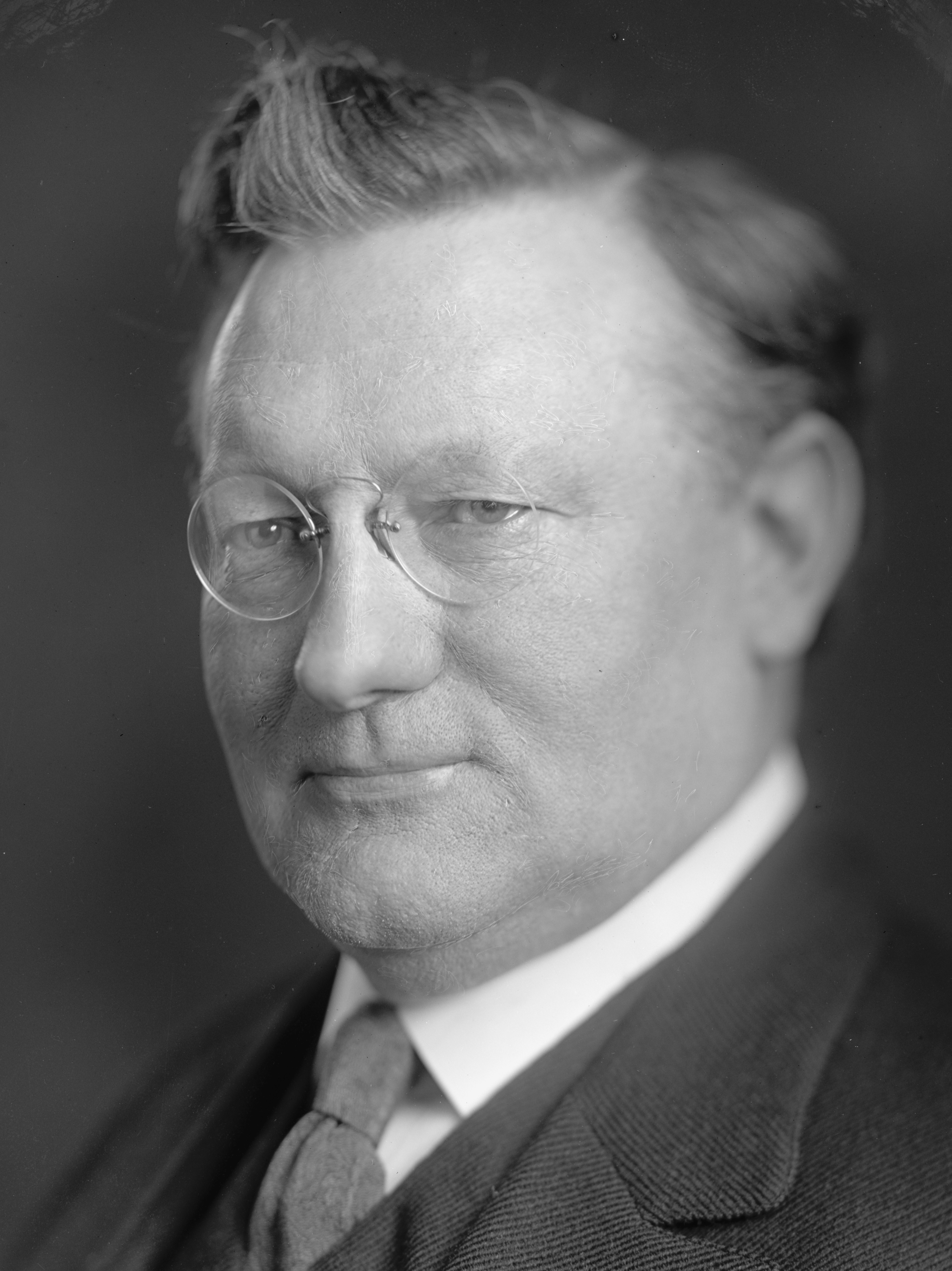

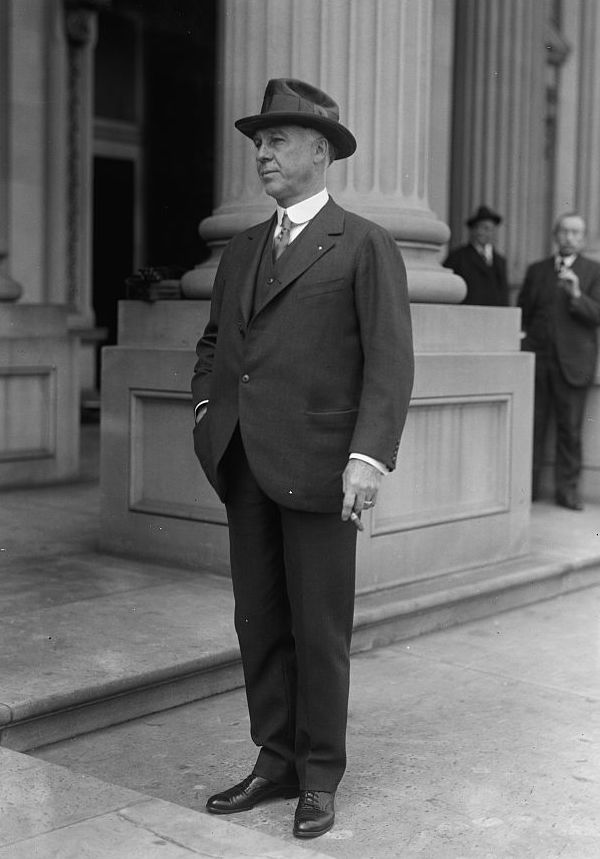
Nominee	James Eli Watson	Thomas Taggart
Party	Republican	Democratic
Popular vote	335,193	325,577
Percentage	47.66%	46.29%
- County results Watson: 40–50% 50–60% 60–70% Taggart: 40–50% 50–60% 60–70%
U.S. senator before election
Thomas Taggart
Democratic
Elected U.S. senator
James Eli Watson
Republican

Indiana election
Party	Candidate	Votes	%
Republican	James Eli Watson	335,193	47.66
Democratic	Thomas Taggart (incumbent)	325,577	46.29
Socialist	Edward Henry	21,626	3.08
Prohibition	William H. Hickman	16,095	2.29
Progressive	John F. Clifford	4,798	0.68
Total votes		703,289	100.00
Republican gain from Democratic			

Two-term Democrat Benjamin F. Shively was re-elected in 1914 and served until he died on March 14, 1916. Democrat Thomas Taggart was appointed by Governor Samuel Ralston on March 20 to continue the term until a November 7, 1916, special election. Taggart lost the special election to Republican James Eli Watson.

Watson would finish out the term, be re-elected twice, and serve until his 1932 re-election loss.

=== Indiana (regular) ===
1916 United States Senate election in Indiana
- November 7, 1916
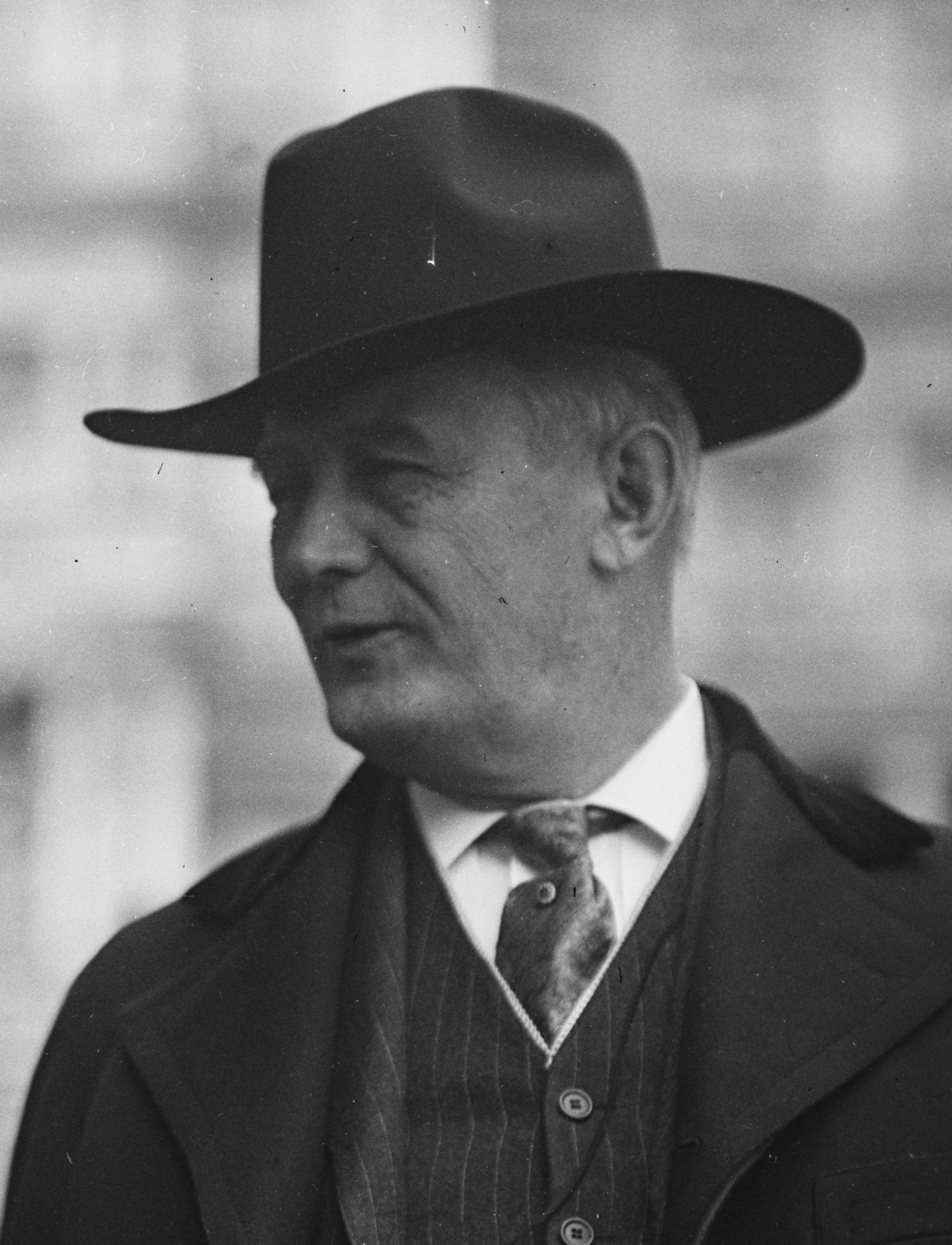

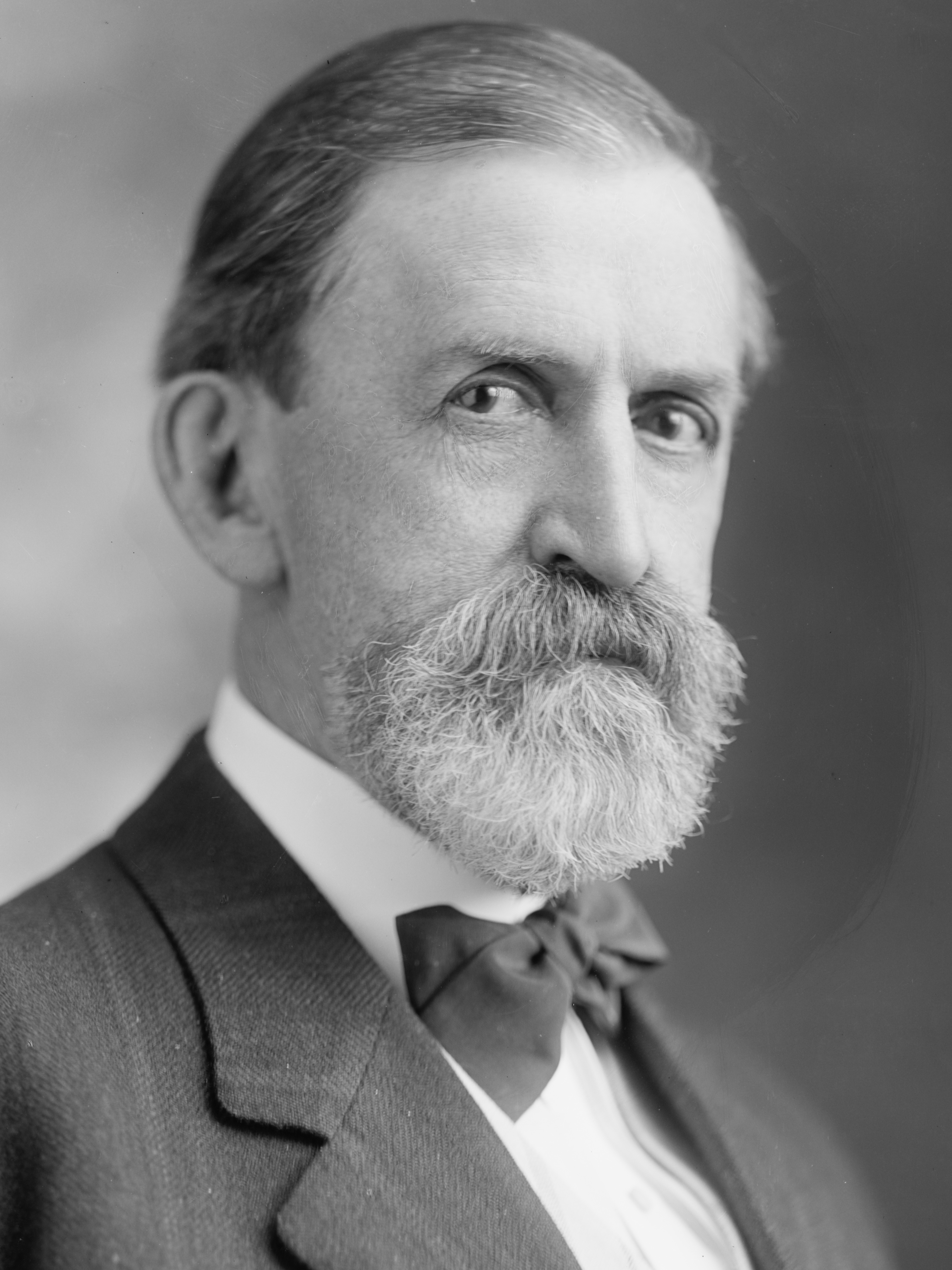
Nominee	Harry New	John W. Kern
Party	Republican	Democratic
Popular vote	337,089	325,588
Percentage	47.77%	46.14%
- County results New: 40–50% 50–60% 60–70% Kern: 40–50% 50–60% 60–70%
U.S. senator before election
John W. Kern
Democratic
Elected U.S. Senator
Harry New
Republican

1916 U.S. Senate election in Indiana
Party	Candidate	Votes	%
Republican	Harry Stewart New	337,089	47.77%
Democratic	John W. Kern (incumbent)	325,588	46.14%
Socialist	Joseph Zimmerman	21,558	3.06%
Prohibition	Elwood Haynes	15,598	2.21%
Progressive	John N. Dyer	4,272	0.61%
Socialist Labor	Ira J. Decker	1,562	0.22%
Total votes		705,667	100.00%
Republican gain from Democratic			

One-term Democrat John W. Kern was elected in 1911. He lost re-election to Republican Harry Stewart New.

New served only until losing renomination in 1922. Kern died on August 17, 1917, the same year he left the U.S. Senate.

== Maine ==
There were two elections due to a vacancy. Both elections were held on September 11, 1916, as Maine routinely held its annual elections in September at the time.

=== Maine (special) ===
1916 United States Senate special election in Maine
- September 11, 1916
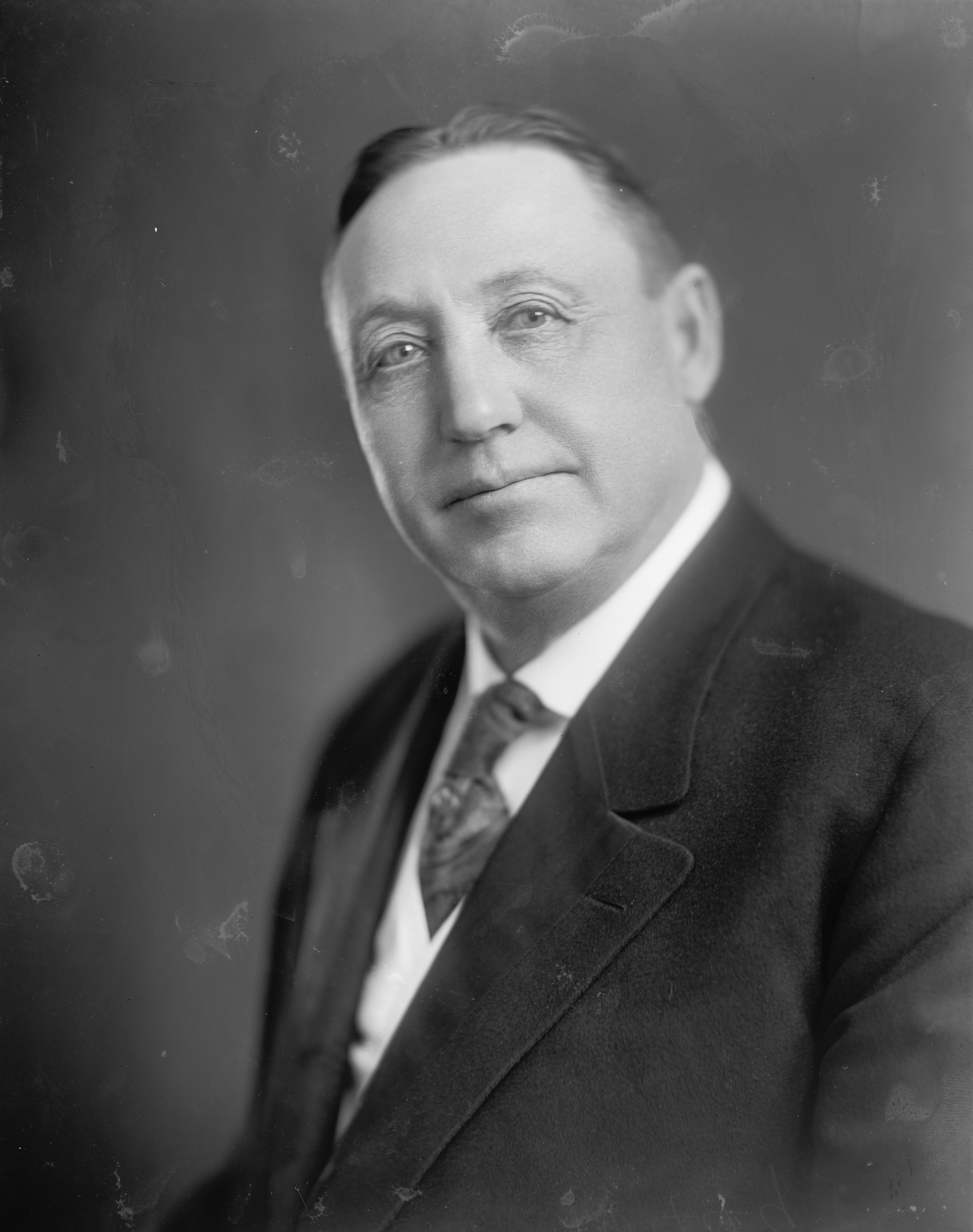

Nominee	Bert M. Fernald	Kenneth C. Sills
Party	Republican	Democratic
Popular vote	81,369	68,201
Percentage	54.27%	45.49%
- County results Fernald: 50–60% 60–70% Sillis: 50–60%
U.S. senator before election
Edwin C. Burleigh
Republican
Elected U.S. senator
Bert M. Fernald
Republican

Maine election
Party	Candidate	Votes	%
Republican	Bert M. Fernald	81,369	54.27%
Democratic	Kenneth C. Sills	68,201	45.49%
Prohibition	Frederick A. Shepherd	348	2.29%
	Others	11	0.01%
Total votes		149,929	100.00%
Republican hold			

One-term Republican Edwin C. Burleigh was elected in 1913, and died on June 16, 1916. Republican Bert M. Fernald was elected on September 12, 1916, to finish the term.

Fernand would later be re-elected twice and serve until his 1926 death.

=== Maine (regular) ===
1916 United States Senate election in Maine
- September 11, 1916
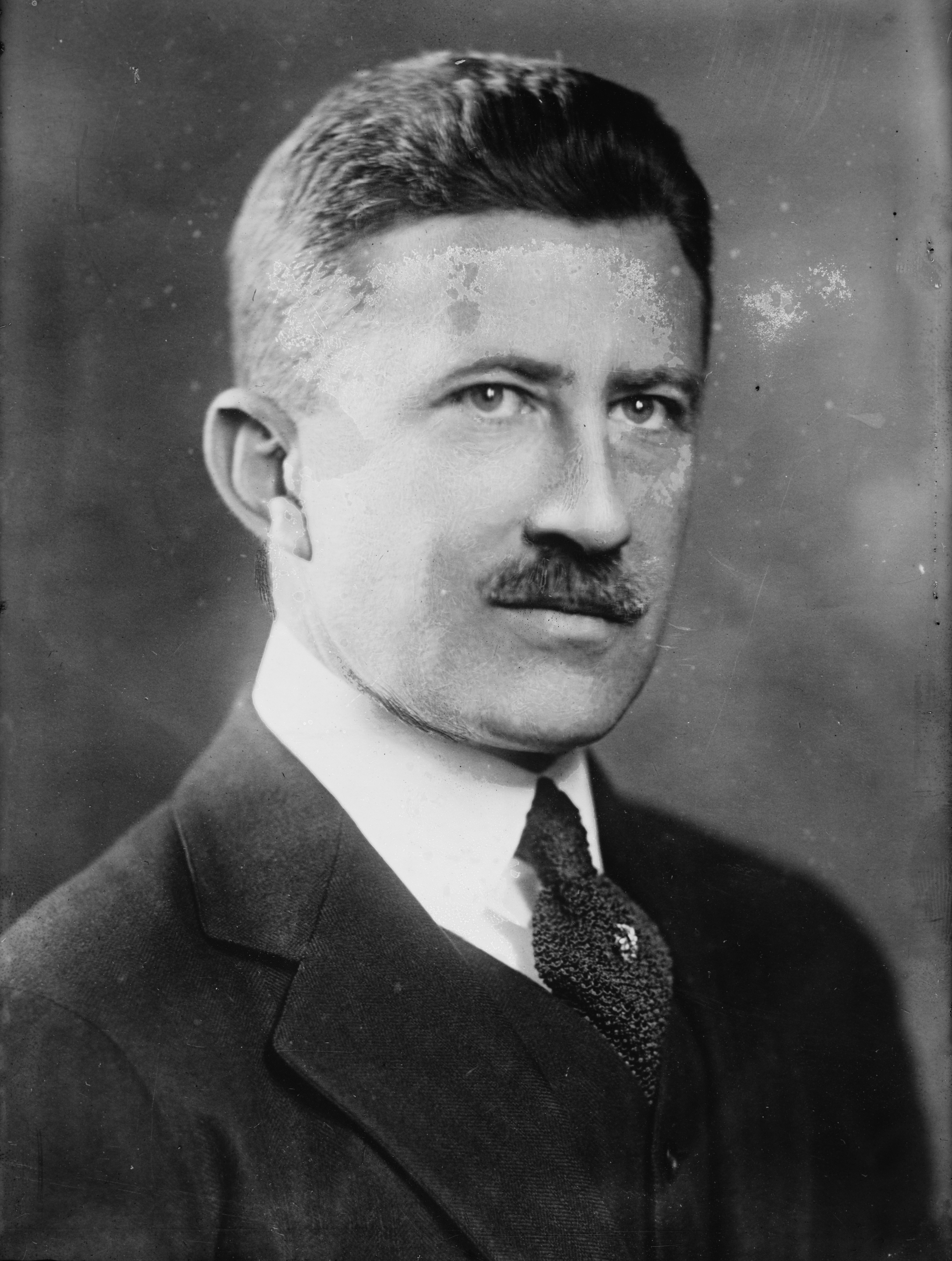

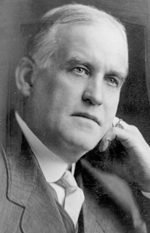
Nominee	Frederick Hale	Charles F. Johnson
Party	Republican	Democratic
Popular vote	79,481	69,486
Percentage	52.72%	46.09%
- County results Hale: 40–50% 50–60% 60–70% Johnson: 50–60%
U.S. senator before election
Charles F. Johnson
Democratic
Elected U.S. Senator
Frederick Hale
Republican

1916 U.S. Senate election in Maine
Party	Candidate	Votes	%
Republican	Frederick Hale	79,481	52.72%
Democratic	Charles F. Johnson (incumbent)	69,486	46.09%
Socialist	James F. Carey	1,510	1.00%
Prohibition	Arthur C. Johnson	279	0.19%
Write-in		7	0.01%
Total votes		150,763	100.00%

One-term Democrat Charles Fletcher Johnson was elected in 1911. He lost re-election to Republican Frederick Hale.

Hale would later be re-elected three times and serve until his 1935 retirement.

== Maryland ==
1916 United States Senate election in Maryland
- November 7, 1916
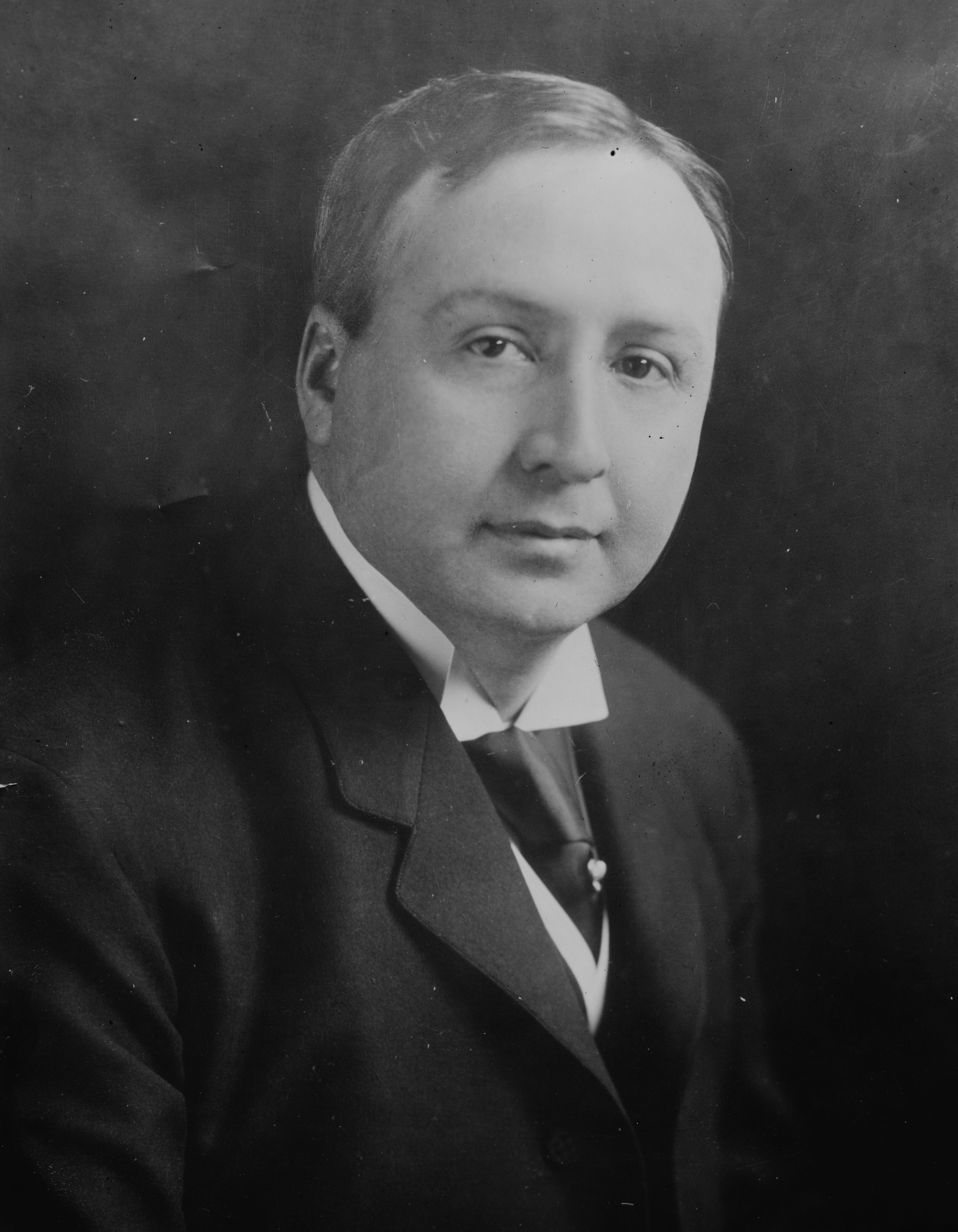

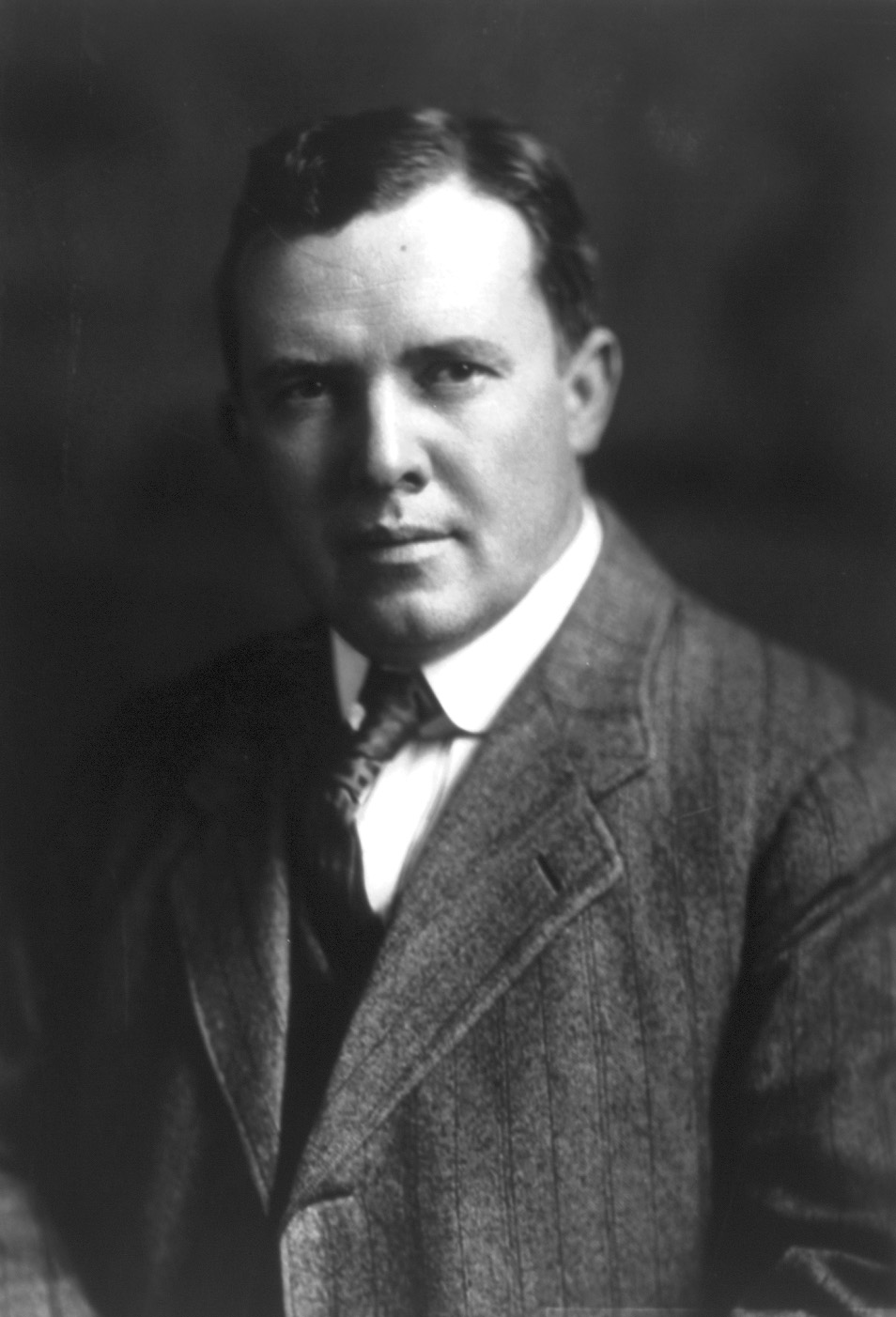
Nominee	Joseph I. France	David John Lewis
Party	Republican	Democratic
Popular vote	113,662	109,740
Percentage	49.32%	47.62%
- County results France: 40–50% 50–60% Lewis: 40–50% 50–60% 60–70%
U.S. senator before election
Blair Lee I
Democratic
Elected U.S. Senator
Joseph I. France
Republican

1916 U.S. Senate election in Maryland
Party	Candidate	Votes	%	±%
Republican	Joseph I. France	113,662	49.32%	▲12.34
Democratic	David John Lewis	109,740	47.62%	▼9.13
Prohibition	James W. Frizzell	3,325	1.44%	▲0.23
Socialist	Sylvester L. Young	2,590	1.12%	▼0.29
Labor	Robert E. Long	1,143	0.50%	N/A
Total votes		230,460	100.00%	

== Massachusetts ==
1916 United States Senate election in Massachusetts
- November 7, 1916
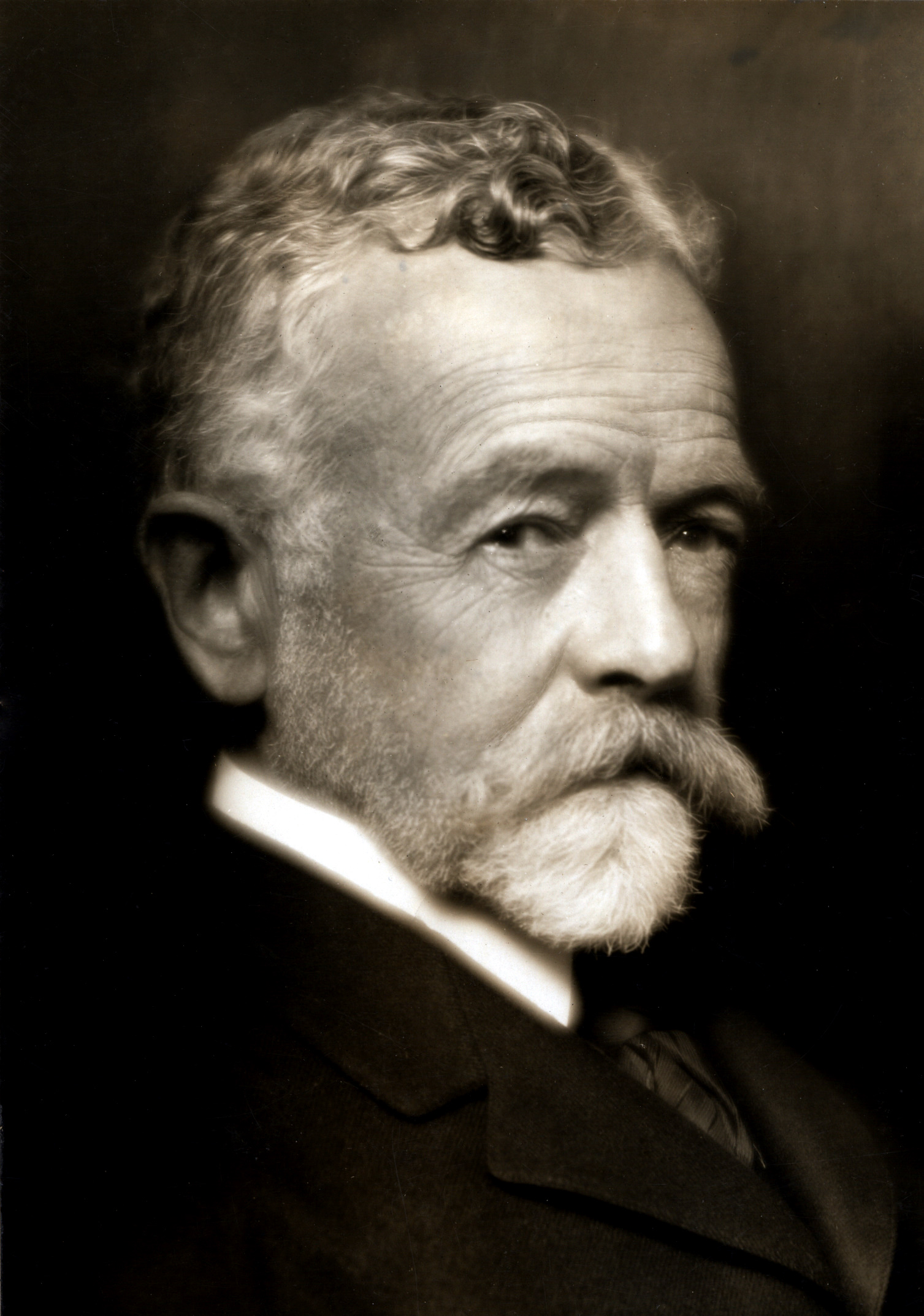

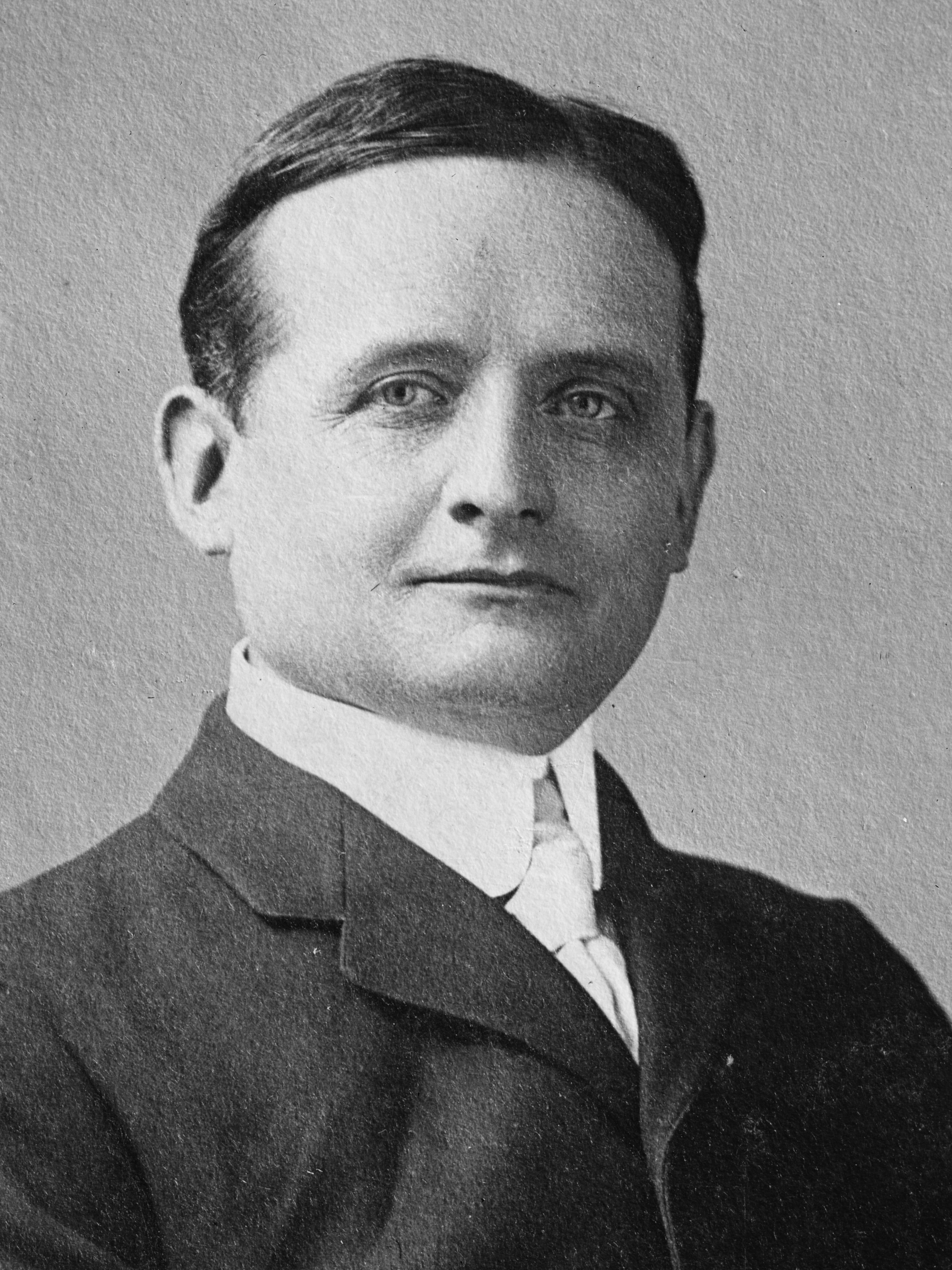
Nominee	Henry Cabot Lodge	John F. Fitzgerald
Party	Republican	Democratic
Popular vote	267,177	234,238
Percentage	51.68%	45.31%
- Lodge: 40–50% 50–60% 60–70% 70–80% 80–90% >90% Fitzgerald: 40–50% 50–60% 60–70%
Senator before election
Henry Cabot Lodge
Republican
Elected Senator
Henry Cabot Lodge
Republican

1916 United States Senate election in Massachusetts
Party	Candidate	Votes	%
Republican	Henry Cabot Lodge (incumbent)	267,177	51.68%
Democratic	John F. Fitzgerald	234,238	45.31%
Socialist	William N. McDonald	15,558	3.01%
Write-in	All others	26	0.00%
Total votes		516,999	100.00%

== Michigan ==
1916 United States Senate election in Michigan
- November 7, 1916
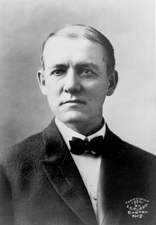

Nominee	Charles E. Townsend	Lawrence Price
Party	Republican	Democratic
Popular vote	364,657	257,954
Percentage	56.34%	39.85%
- County results Townsend: 40–50% 50–60% 60–70% 70–80% Price: 40–50%
U.S. senator before election
Charles E. Townsend
Republican
Elected U.S. Senator
Charles E. Townsend
Republican

1916 U.S. Senate election in Michigan
Party	Candidate	Votes	%
Republican	Charles E. Townsend (incumbent)	364,657	56.34%
Democratic	Lawrence Price	257,954	39.85%
Socialist	Edward O. Foss	15,614	2.41%
Prohibition	John Y. Johnston	7,569	1.17%
Socialist Labor	Herman Richter	924	0.14%
Independent	Henry Ford (write-in)	566	0.09%
Total votes		677,284	100.00%
Republican hold			

== Minnesota ==
1916 United States Senate election in Minnesota
- November 7, 1916
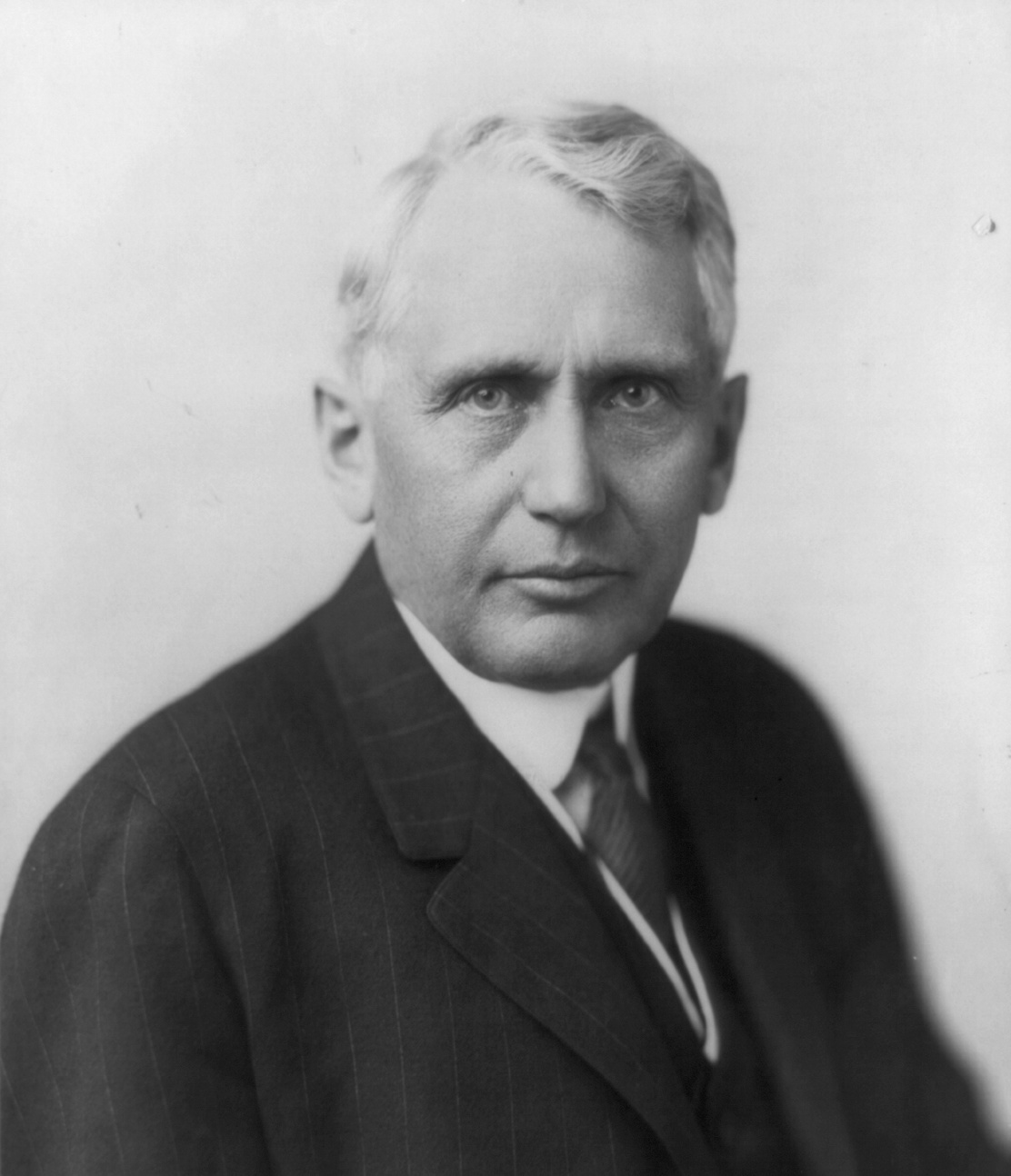

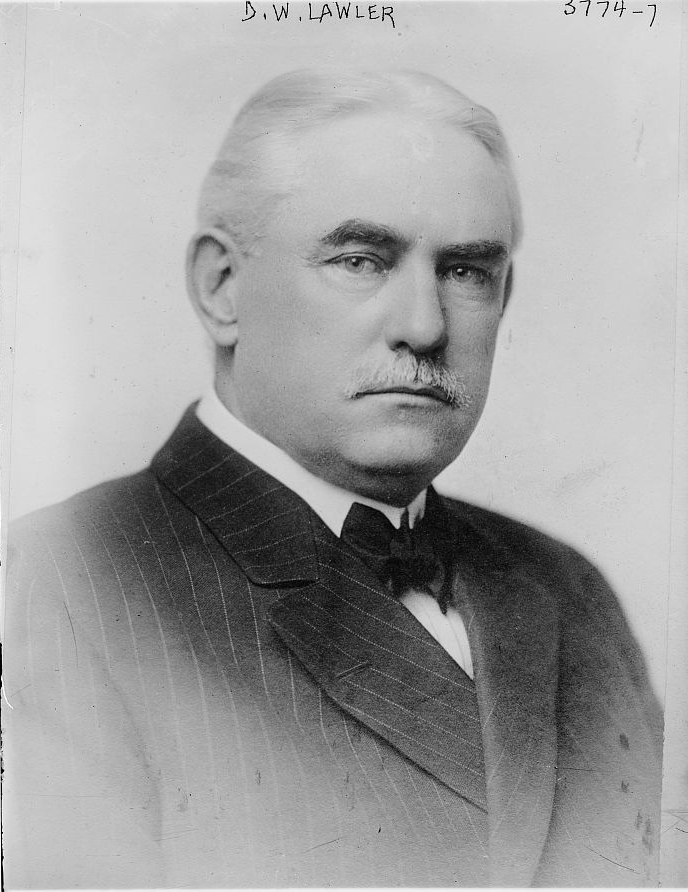

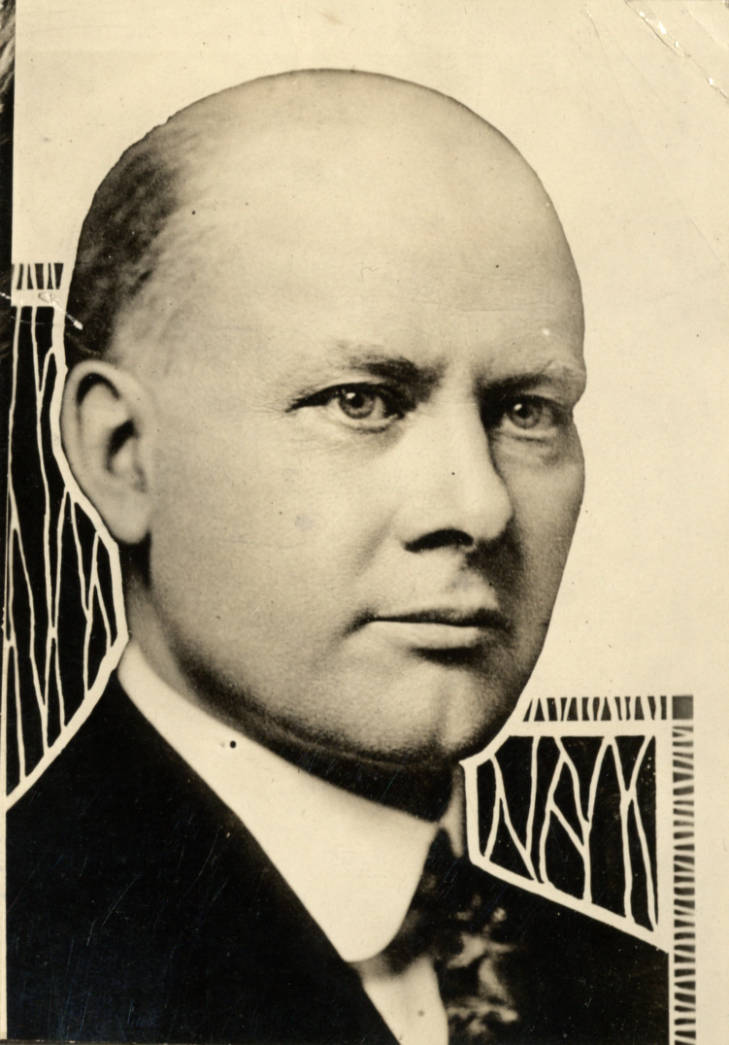
Nominee	Frank B. Kellogg	Daniel W. Lawler	Willis G. Calderwood
Party	Republican	Democratic	Prohibition
Popular vote	185,159	117,541	78,425
Percentage	48.58%	30.84%	20.58%
- County results Kellogg: 30–40% 40–50% 50–60% 60–70% Lawler: 40–50% 50–60%
U.S. senator before election
Moses E. Clapp
Republican
Elected U.S. Senator
Frank B. Kellogg
Republican

General election results
Party	Candidate	Votes	%
Republican	Frank B. Kellogg	185,159	48.58%
Democratic	Daniel W. Lawler	117,541	30.84%
Prohibition	W. G. Calderwood	78,425	20.58%
Total votes		381,125	100.00%
Majority		67,618	17.74%
Republican hold			

== Mississippi ==
1916 United States Senate election in Mississippi
- November 7, 1916
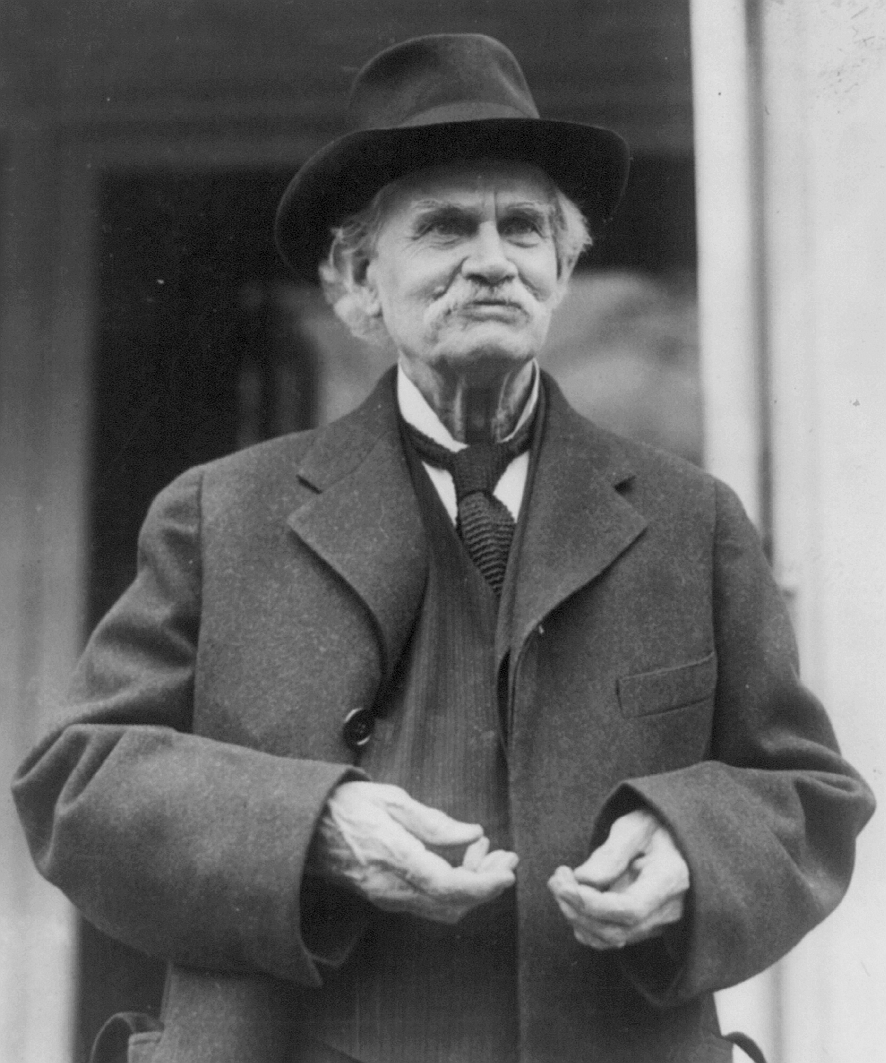
Nominee	John Sharp Williams
Party	Democratic
Popular vote	74,290
Percentage	100%
- Results by county Williams: 100% No Data/Vote
U.S. senator before election
John Sharp Williams
Democratic
Elected U.S. senator
John Sharp Williams
Democratic

Mississippi Democratic primary
Party	Candidate	Votes	%
Democratic	John Sharp Williams (incumbent)	74,290	100%
Total votes		74,290	100
Democratic hold			

== Missouri ==
1916 United States Senate election in Missouri
- November 7, 1916
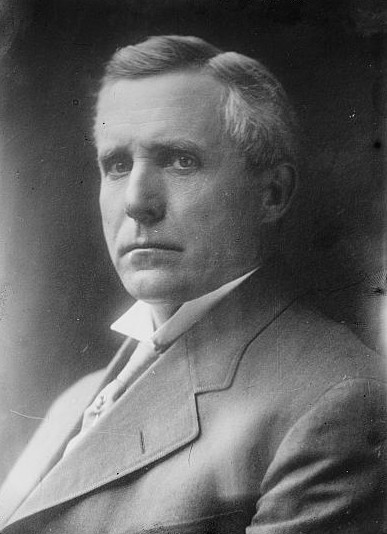

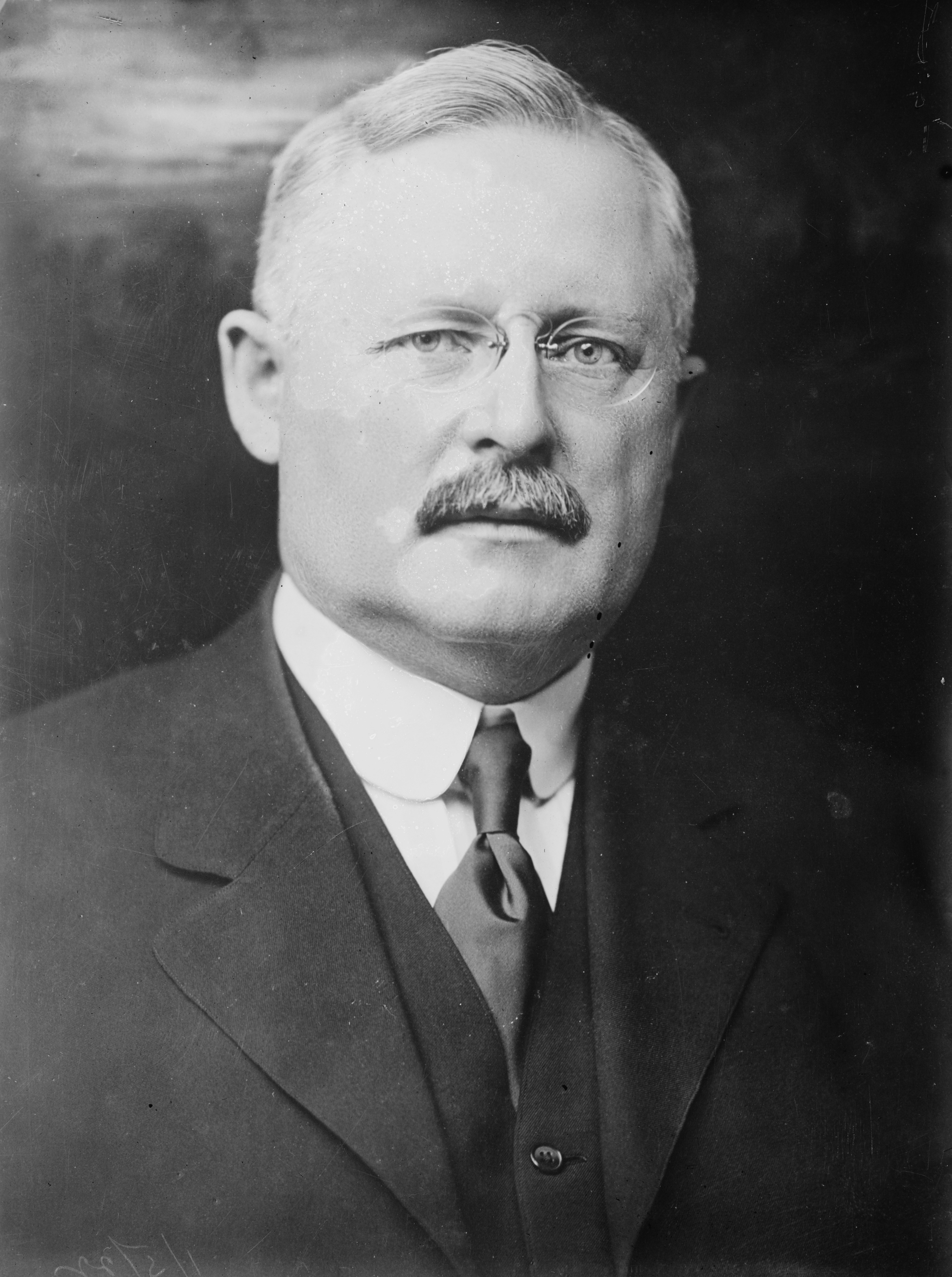
Nominee	James A. Reed	Walter S. Dickey
Party	Democratic	Republican
Popular vote	396,166	371,710
Percentage	50.56%	47.44%
- Results by county Reed: 40–50% 50–60% 60–70% 70–80% 80–90% Dickey: 40–50% 50–60% 60–70% 70–80% 80–90%
U.S. senator before election
James A. Reed
Democratic
Elected U.S. Senator
James A. Reed
Democratic

1916 U.S. Senate election in Missouri
Party	Candidate	Votes	%
Democratic	James A. Reed (incumbent)	396,166	50.56%
Republican	Walter S. Dickey	371,710	47.44%
Socialist	Kate Richards O'Hare	14,654	1.87%
Socialist Labor	Joseph Scheidler	962	0.12%
Total votes		783,492	100.00%

== Montana ==
1916 United States Senate election in Montana
- November 7, 1916
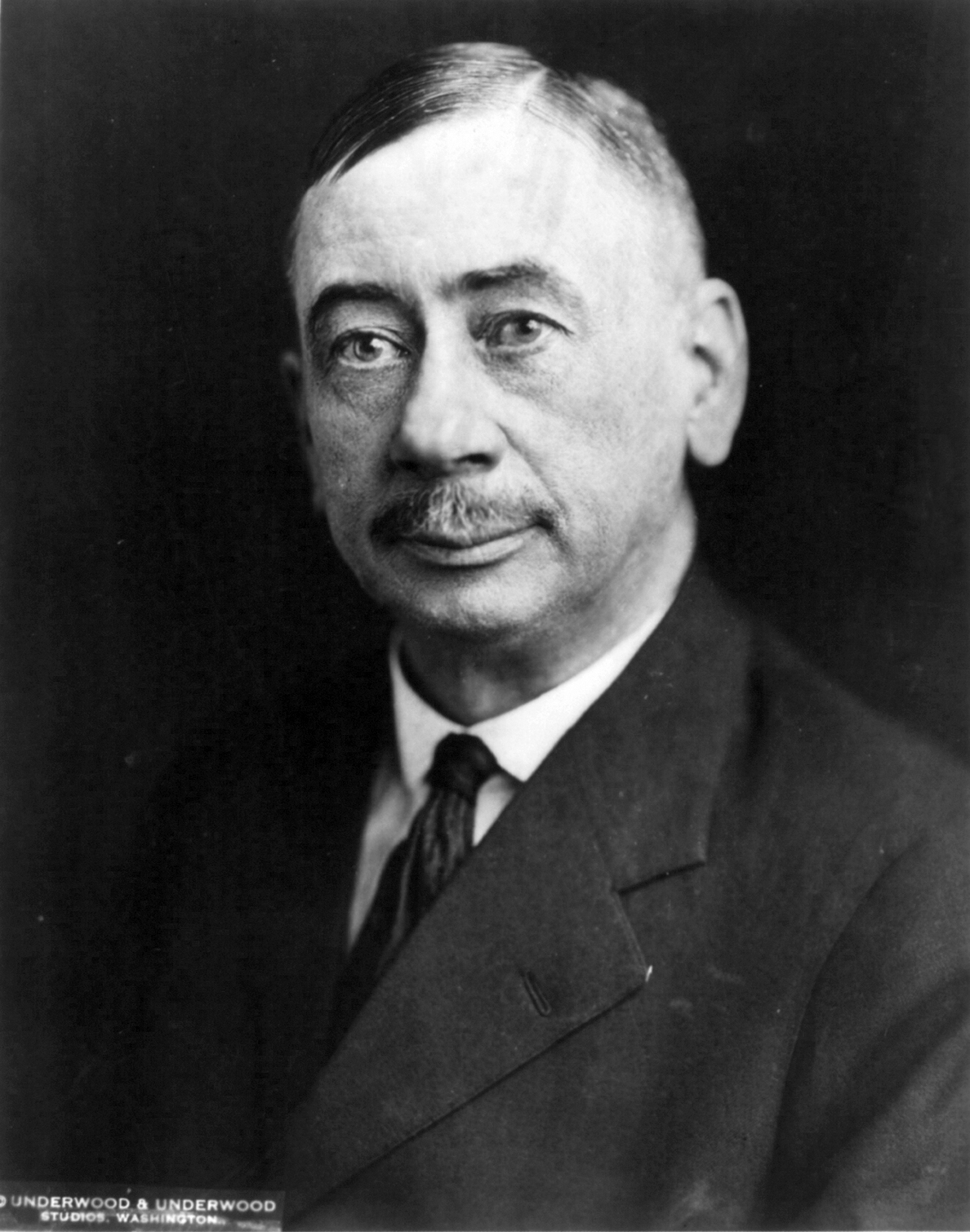

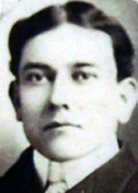

Nominee	Henry L. Myers	Charles N. Pray	Henry La Beau
Party	Democratic	Republican	Socialist
Popular vote	85,585	72,753	9,292
Percentage	51.06%	43.40%	5.54%
- Results by county Myers: 40–50% 50–60% 60–70% Pray: 40–50% 50–60%
U.S. senator before election
Henry L. Myers
Democratic
Elected U.S. Senator
Henry L. Myers
Democratic

1916 United States Senate election in Montana
Party	Candidate	Votes	%
Democratic	Henry L. Myers (incumbent)	85,585	51.06%
Republican	Charles N. Pray	72,753	43.40%
Socialist	Henry La Beau	9,292	5.54%
Total votes		167,630	100.00%
Democratic hold			

== Nebraska ==
1916 United States Senate election in Nebraska
- November 7, 1916
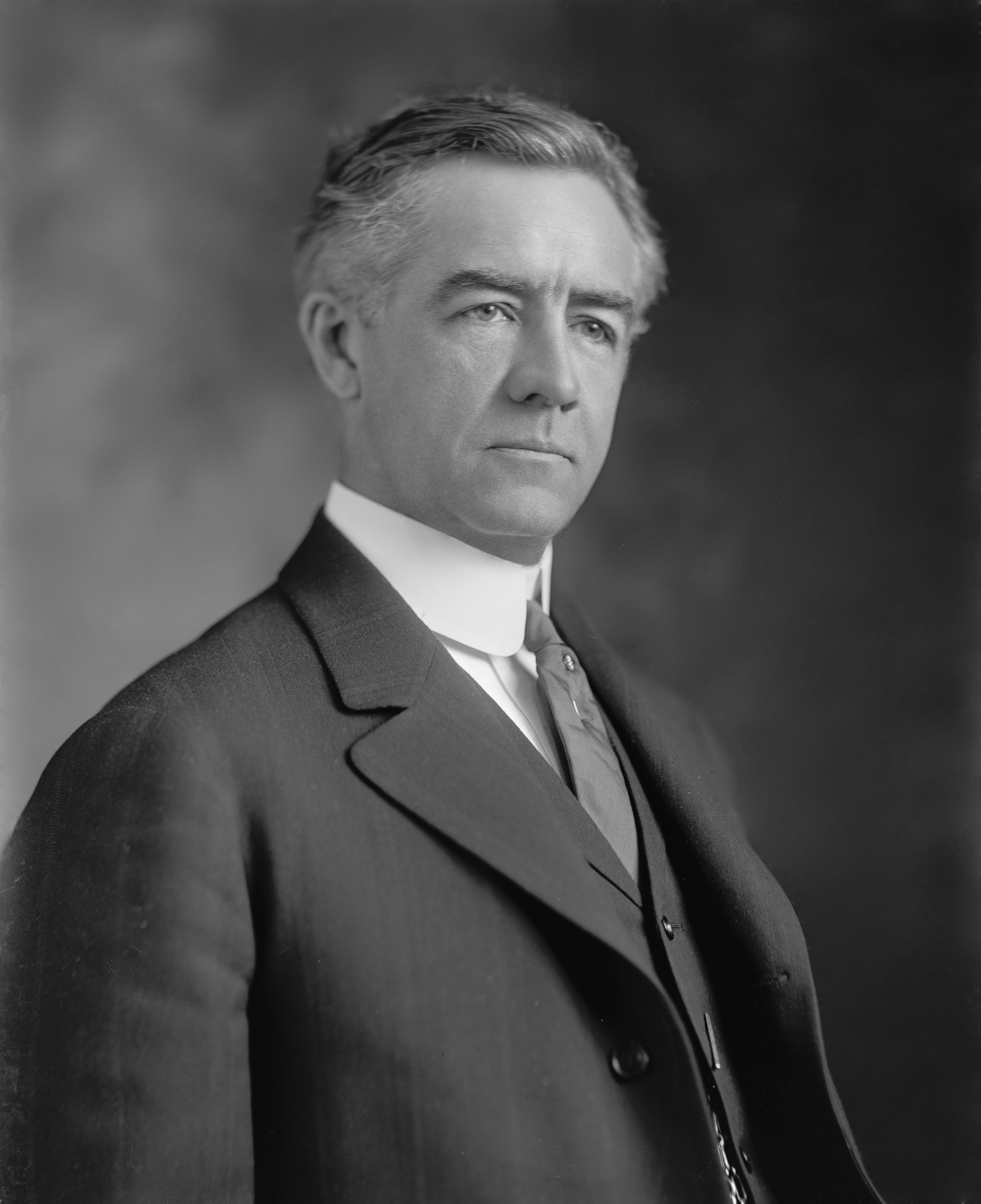

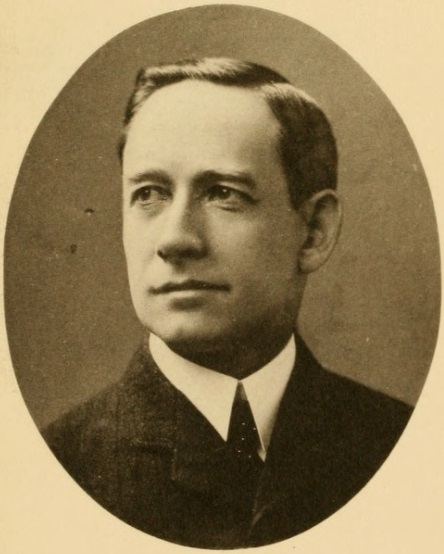
Nominee	Gilbert Hitchcock	John L. Kennedy
Party	Democratic	Republican
Popular vote	143,082	131,359
Percentage	49.98%	45.88%
- County results Hitchcock: 40–50% 50–60% 60–70% Kennedy: 40–50% 50–60% Tie: 40–50%
U.S. senator before election
Gilbert Hitchcock
Democratic
Elected U.S. Senator
Gilbert Hitchcock
Democratic

General election results
Party	Candidate	Votes	%
Democratic	Gilbert Hitchcock (incumbent)	143,082	49.98%
Republican	John L. Kennedy	131,359	45.88%
Socialist	E. E. Olmstead	7,425	2.59%
Prohibition	D. B. Gilbert	4,429	1.55%
Total votes		286,295	100.00%
Democratic hold			

== Nevada ==
1916 United States Senate election in Nevada
- November 7, 1916
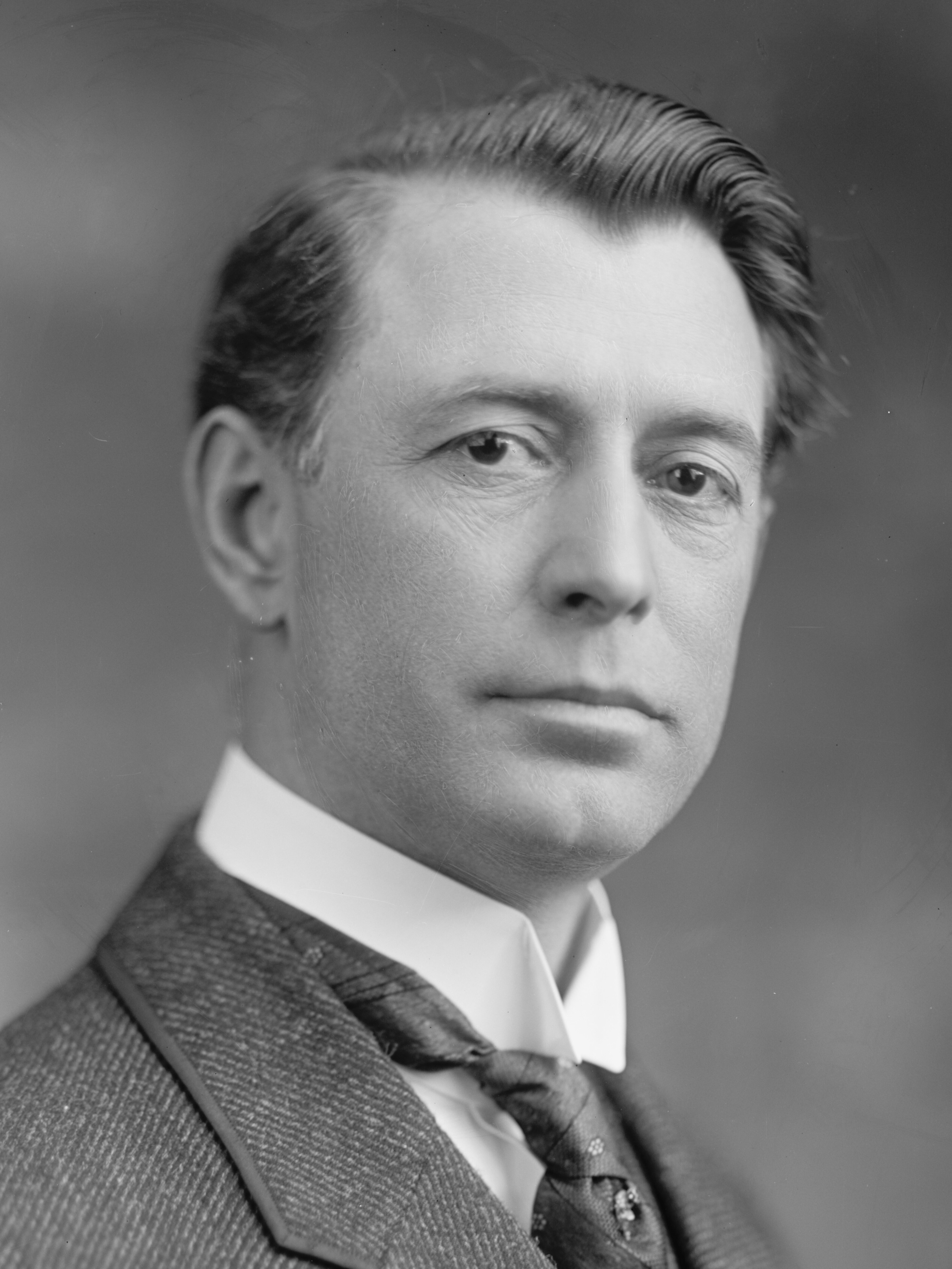

Nominee	Key Pittman	Samuel Platt	Ashley Grant Miller
Party	Democratic	Republican	Socialist
Popular vote	12,765	10,618	9,507
Percentage	38.81%	32.28%	28.91%
- County results Pittman: 30–40% 40–50% Platt: 30–40% 40–50% Miller: 30–40% 40–50%
U.S. senator before election
Key Pittman
Democratic
Elected U.S. Senator
Key Pittman
Democratic

General election results
Party	Candidate	Votes	%
Democratic	Key Pittman (incumbent)	12,765	38.81%
Republican	Samuel Platt	10,618	32.28%
Socialist	Ashley Grant Miller	9,507	28.91%
Total votes		32,890	100.00%
Democratic hold			

== New Jersey ==
1916 United States Senate election in New Jersey
- November 7, 1916
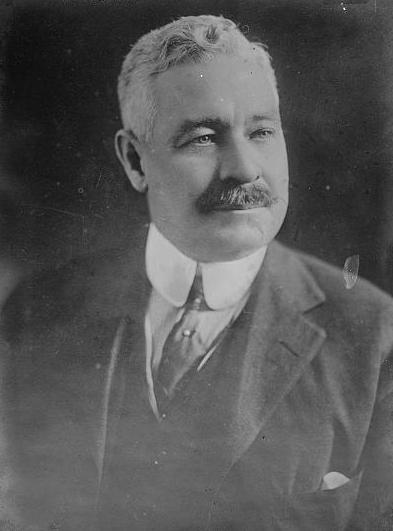

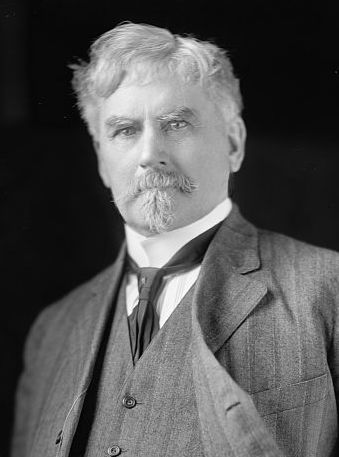
Nominee	Joseph S. Frelinghuysen Sr.	James E. Martine
Party	Republican	Democratic
Popular vote	244,715	170,019
Percentage	55.99%	38.90%
- County results Martine: 40–50% 50–60% Frelinghuysen: 50–60% 60–70%
Senator before election
James E. Martine
Democratic
Elected Senator
Joseph S. Frelinghuysen Sr.
Republican

1916 United States Senate election in New Jersey
Party	Candidate	Votes	%
Republican	Joseph S. Frelinghuysen Sr.	244,715	55.99%
Democratic	James E. Martine (incumbent)	170,019	38.90%
Socialist	William C. Doughty	13,358	3.06%
Prohibition	Livingston Barbour	7,178	0.11%
Socialist Labor	Rudolph Katz	1,826	0.42%

== New Mexico ==
1916 United States Senate election in New Mexico
- November 7, 1916
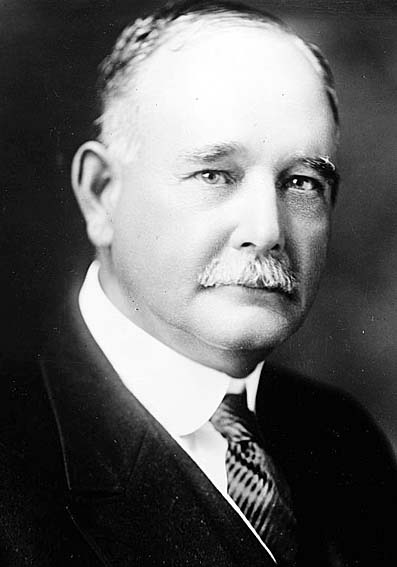

Nominee	Andrieus A. Jones	Frank A. Hubbell
Party	Democratic	Republican
Popular vote	33,981	30,609
Percentage	51.01%	45.95%
- County results Jones: 50–60% 60–70% 70–80% Hubbell: 40–50% 50–60% 70–80%
U.S. senator before election
Thomas B. Catron
Republican
Elected U.S. Senator
Andrieus A. Jones
Democratic

General election results
Party	Candidate	Votes	%
Democratic	Andrieus A. Jones	33,981	51.01%
Republican	Frank A. Hubbell	30,609	45.95%
Socialist	W. P. Metcalf	2,028	3.04%
Total votes		66,618	100.00%
Democratic gain from Republican			

== New York ==
1916 United States Senate election in New York
- November 7, 1916
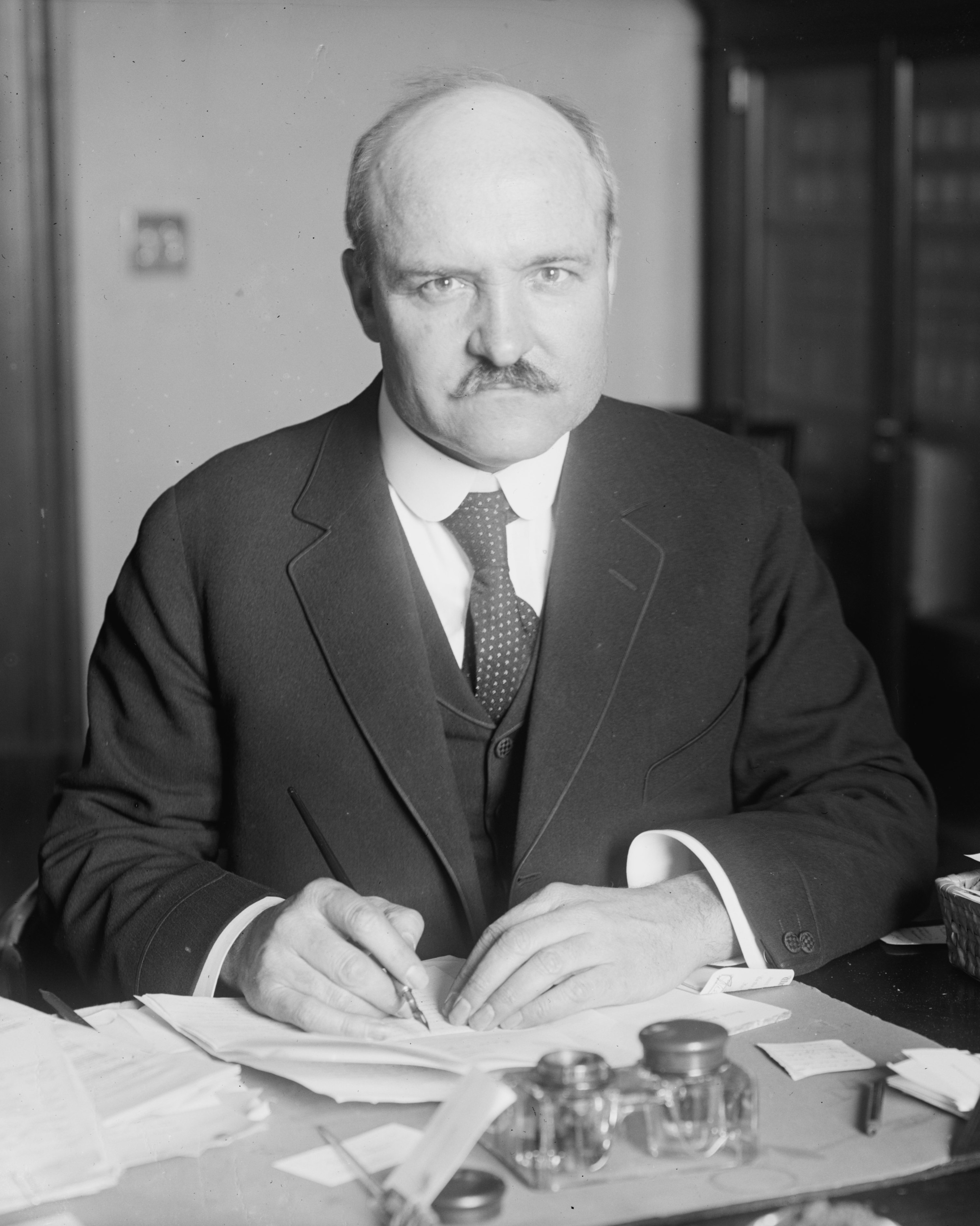

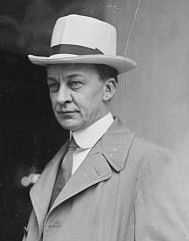
Nominee	William M. Calder	William F. McCombs
Party	Republican	Democratic
Alliance		American
Popular vote	839,314	605,933
Percentage	54.32%	39.22%
- County results Calder: 40–50% 50–60% 60–70% Patton: 40–50% 50–60%
Senator before election
James O'Gorman
Democratic
Elected Senator
William M. Calder
Republican

1916 United States Senate election in New York
Party	Candidate	Votes	%
Republican	William M. Calder	839,314	54.32%
Democratic	William F. McCombs	605,933	39.22%
Socialist	Joseph D. Cannon	61,167	3.96%
Prohibition	D. Leigh Colvin	19,302	1.25%
Progressive	Bainbridge Colby	15,339	0.99%
Socialist Labor	August Gillhaus	4,086	0.26%
Total votes		1,545,141	100.00%

== North Dakota ==
1916 United States Senate election in North Dakota
- November 7, 1916
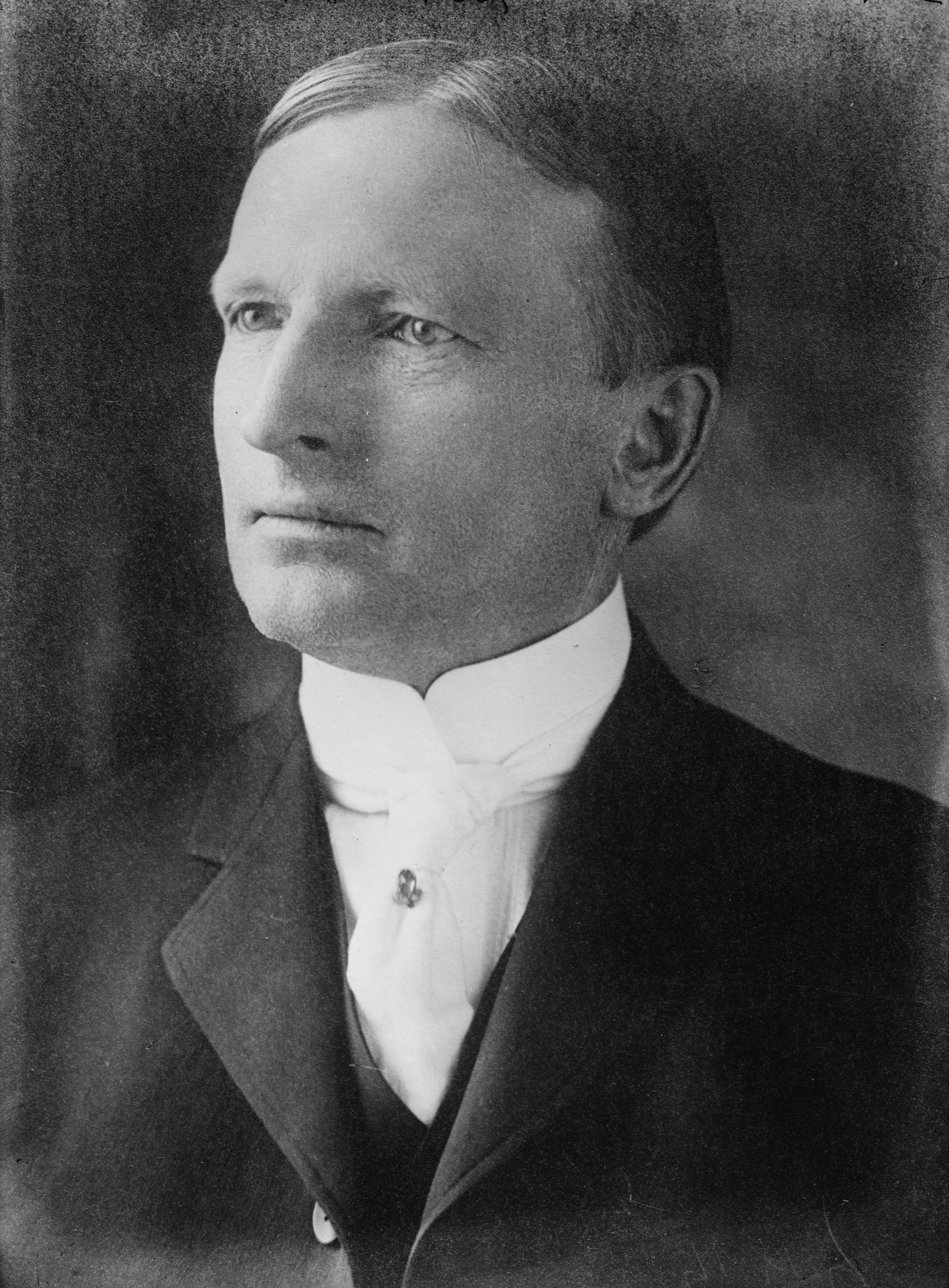

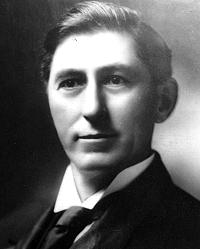

Nominee	Porter J. McCumber	John Burke
Party	Republican	Democratic
Popular vote	57,714	40,988
Percentage	53.85%	38.24%
Nominee	E. R. Fry
Party	Socialist
Popular vote	8,472
Percentage	7.91%
- County results McCumber: 40–50% 50–60% 60–70% 70–80% 80–90% Burke: 40–50%
U.S. senator before election
Porter J. McCumber
Republican
Elected U.S. Senator
Porter J. McCumber
Republican

1916 United States Senate election in North Dakota
Party	Candidate	Votes	%
Republican	Porter J. McCumber (inc.)	57,714	53.85%
Democratic	John Burke	40,988	38.24%
Socialist	E. R. Fry	8,472	7.90%
Majority		16,726	15.61%
Total votes		107,174	100.00%
Republican hold			

== Ohio ==
1916 United States Senate election in Ohio
- November 7, 1916
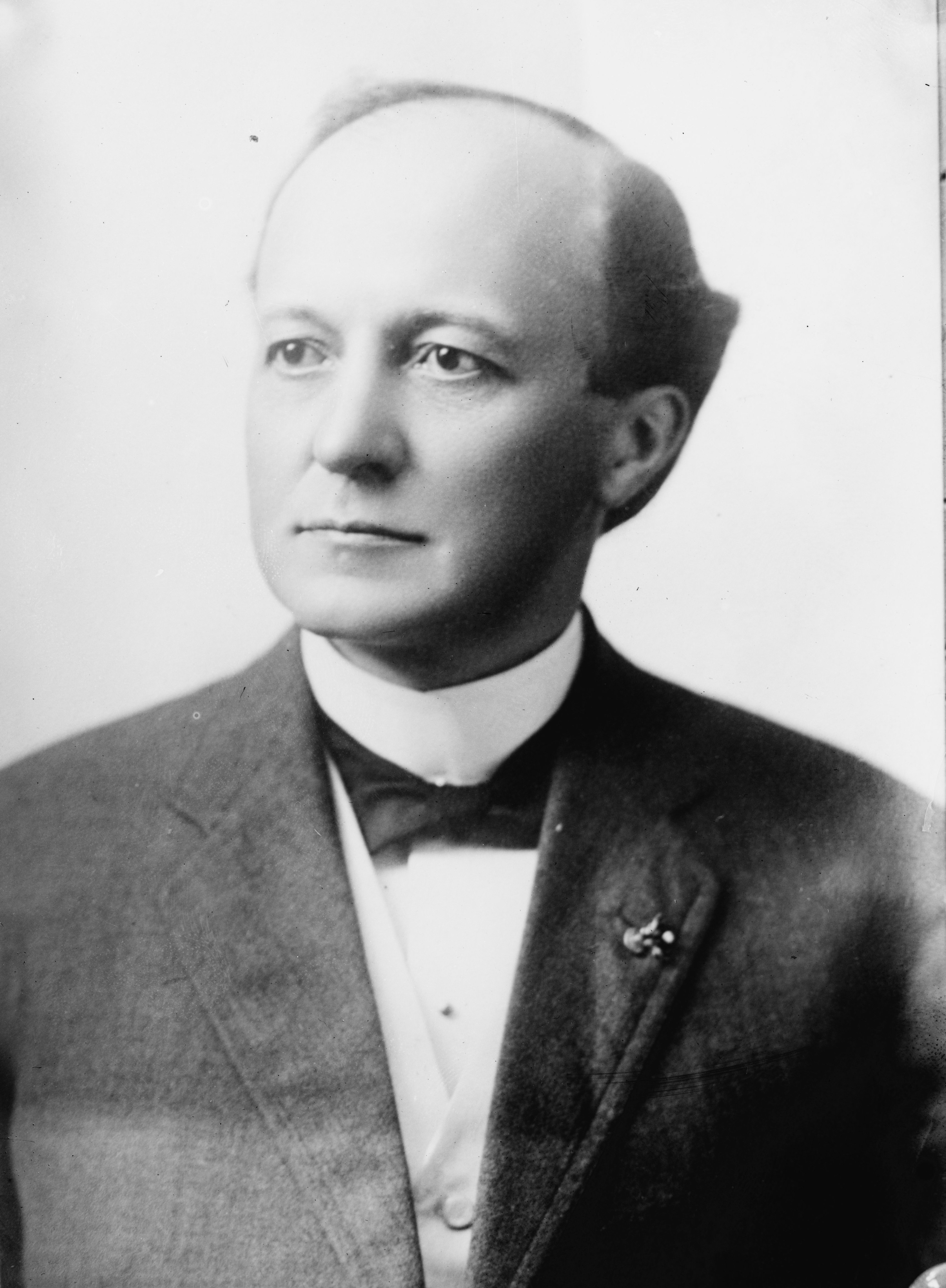

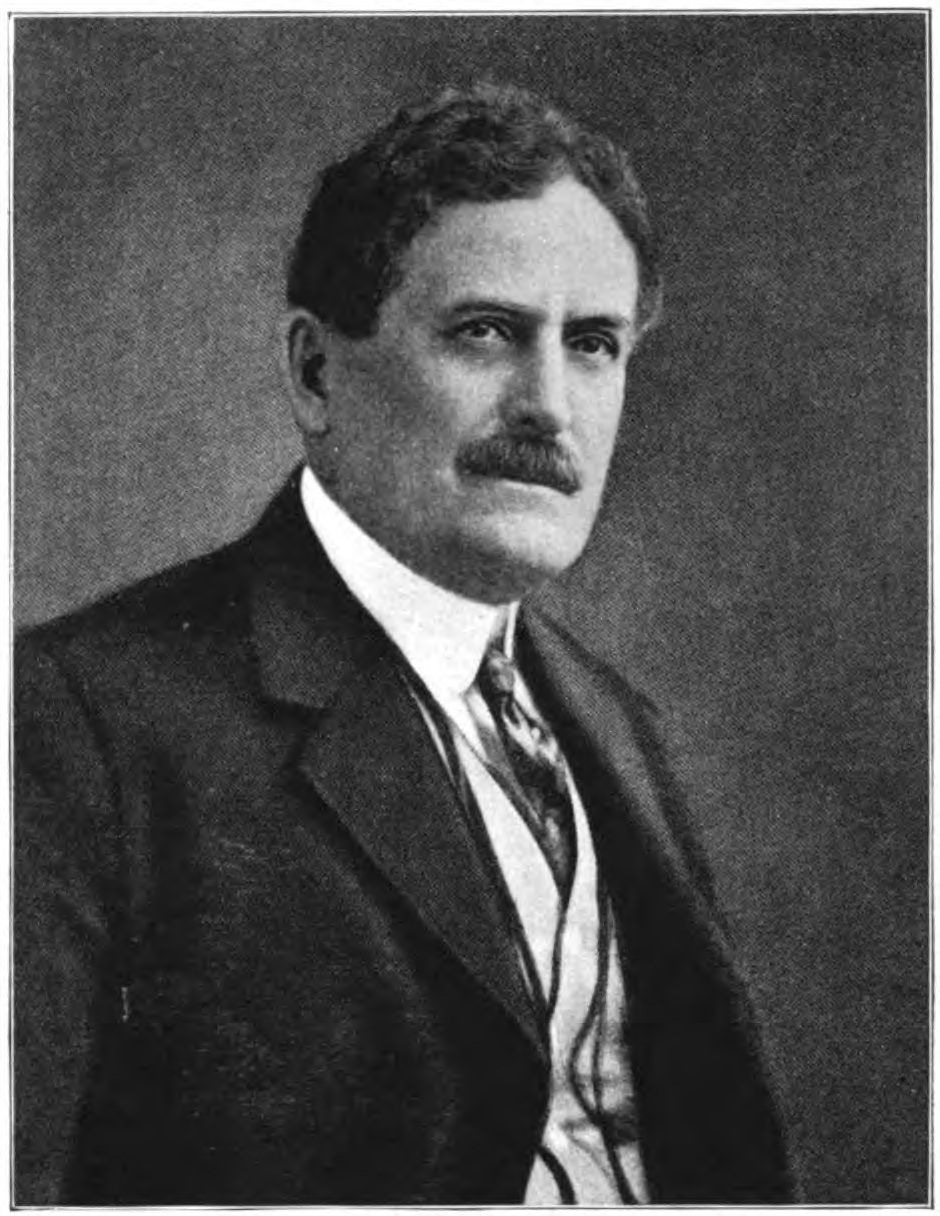
Nominee	Atlee Pomerene	Myron Herrick
Party	Democratic	Republican
Popular vote	571,488	535,391
Percentage	49.26%	46.15%
- County results Pomerene: 40–50% 50–60% 60–70% 70–80% Herrick: 40–50% 50–60%
U.S. senator before election
Atlee Pomerene
Democratic
Elected U.S. Senator
Atlee Pomerene
Democratic

1916 U.S. Senate election in Ohio
Party	Candidate	Votes	%
Democratic	Atlee Pomerene (incumbent)	571,488	49.26%
Republican	Myron Herrick	535,391	46.15%
Socialist	C. E. Ruthenberg	38,186	3.29%
Prohibition	Aaron S. Watkins	12,060	1.04%
Independent	Jacob Coxey	2,965	0.26%
Total votes		1,160,091	100.00%
Democratic hold			

== Pennsylvania ==
1916 United States Senate elections in Pennsylvania
- November 7, 1916
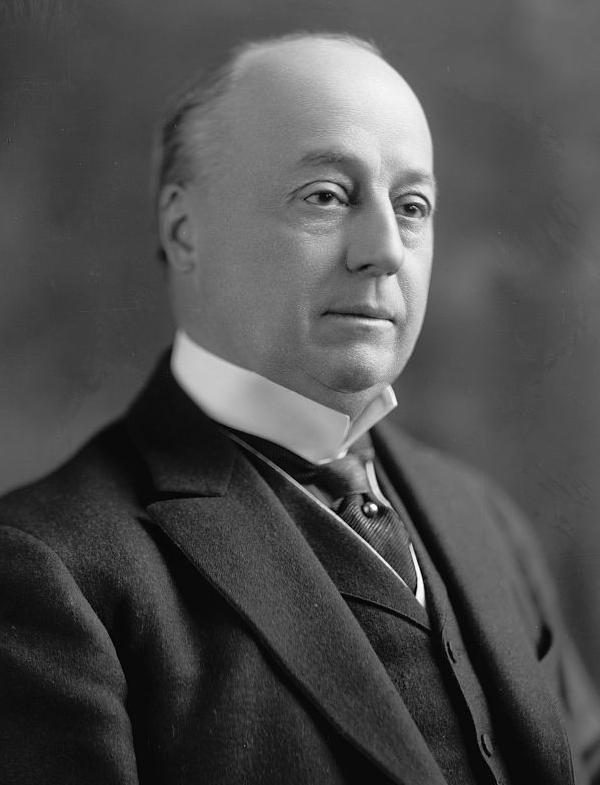
Nominee	Philander C. Knox	Ellis L. Orvis
Party	Republican	Democratic
Popular vote	680,451	450,112
Percentage	56.3%	37.3%
- County results Knox: 40–50% 50–60% 60–70% Orvis: 40–50% 50–60% 60–70%
U.S. senator before election
George T. Oliver
Republican
Elected U.S. Senator
Philander C. Knox
Republican

General election results
Party	Candidate	Votes	%
Republican	Philander C. Knox	680,451	56.31
Democratic	Ellis L. Orvis	450,112	37.25
Socialist	Charles W. Ervin	45,385	3.76
Prohibition	Herbert T. Ames	30,089	2.49
Single Tax	Robert Colvin Macauley, Jr.	1,387	0.12
Socialist Labor	William H. Thomas	1,022	0.09
Total votes		1,208,446	100.00

== Rhode Island ==
1916 United States Senate election in Rhode Island
- November 7, 1916
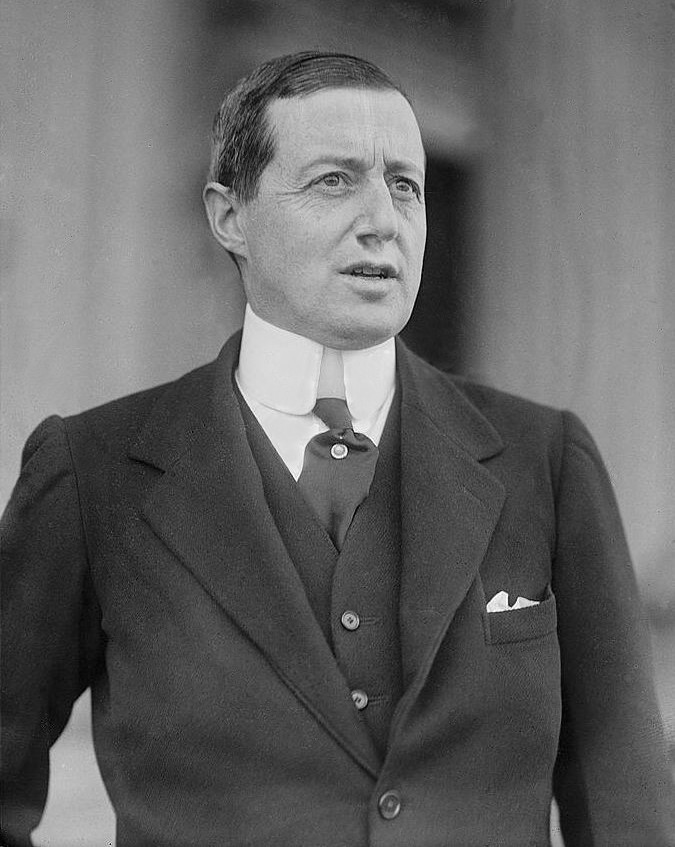

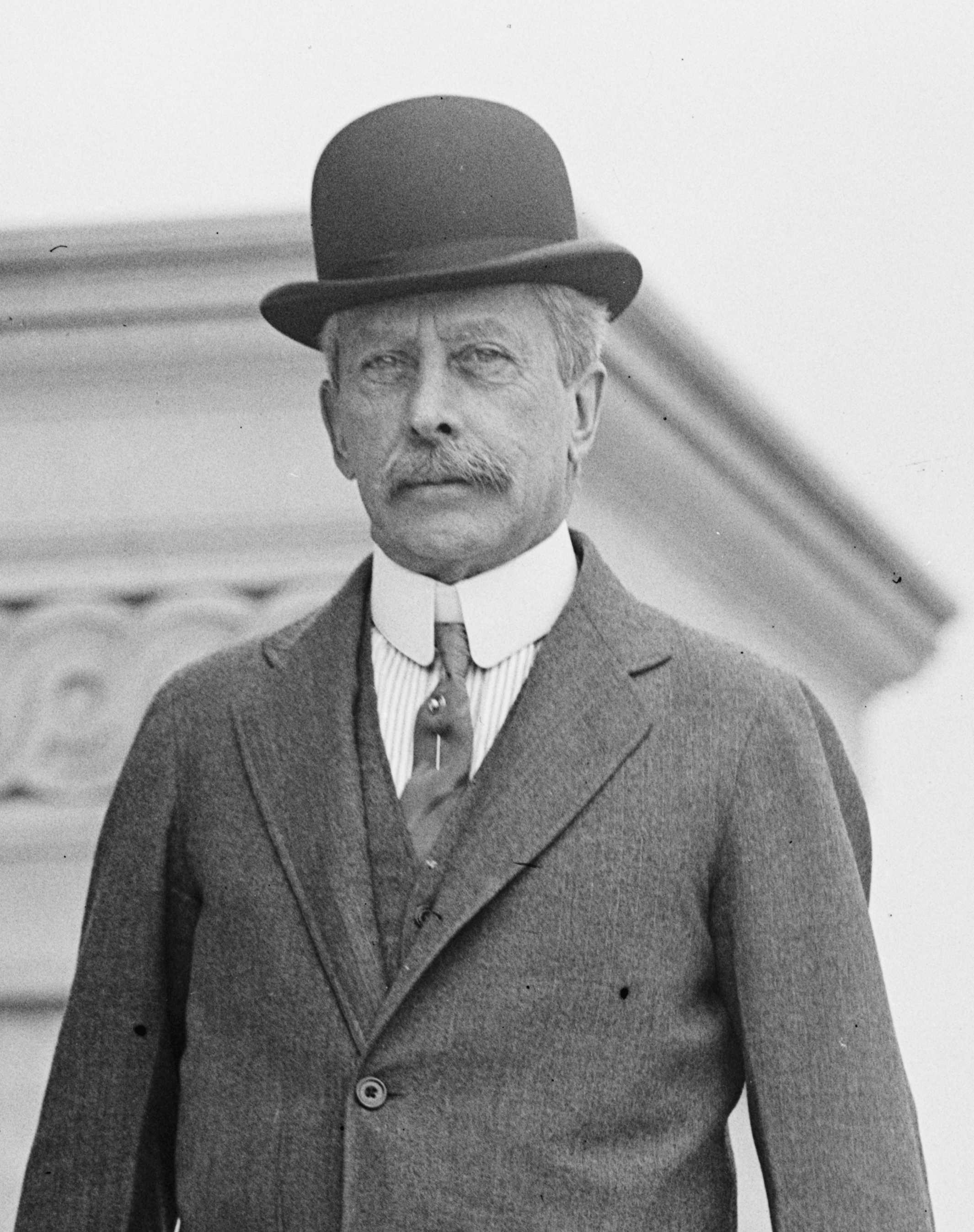
Nominee	Peter G. Gerry	Henry F. Lippitt
Party	Democratic	Republican
Popular vote	47,048	39,211
Percentage	52.94%	44.12%
- County results Gerry: 50–60% Lippitt: 50–60%
U.S. senator before election
Henry F. Lippitt
Republican
Elected U.S. Senator
Peter G. Gerry
Democratic

1916 U.S. Senate election in Rhode Island
Party	Candidate	Votes	%
Democratic	Peter G. Gerry	47,048	52.94%
Republican	Henry F. Lippitt (incumbent)	39,211	44.12%
Socialist	Frederick W. Hurst	1,996	2.25%
Prohibition	Frank J. Sibley	454	0.51%
Socialist Labor	Peter McDermott	168	0.19%
Total votes		88,877	100.00%
Democratic gain from Republican			

== Tennessee ==
1916 United States Senate election in Tennessee
- November 7, 1916
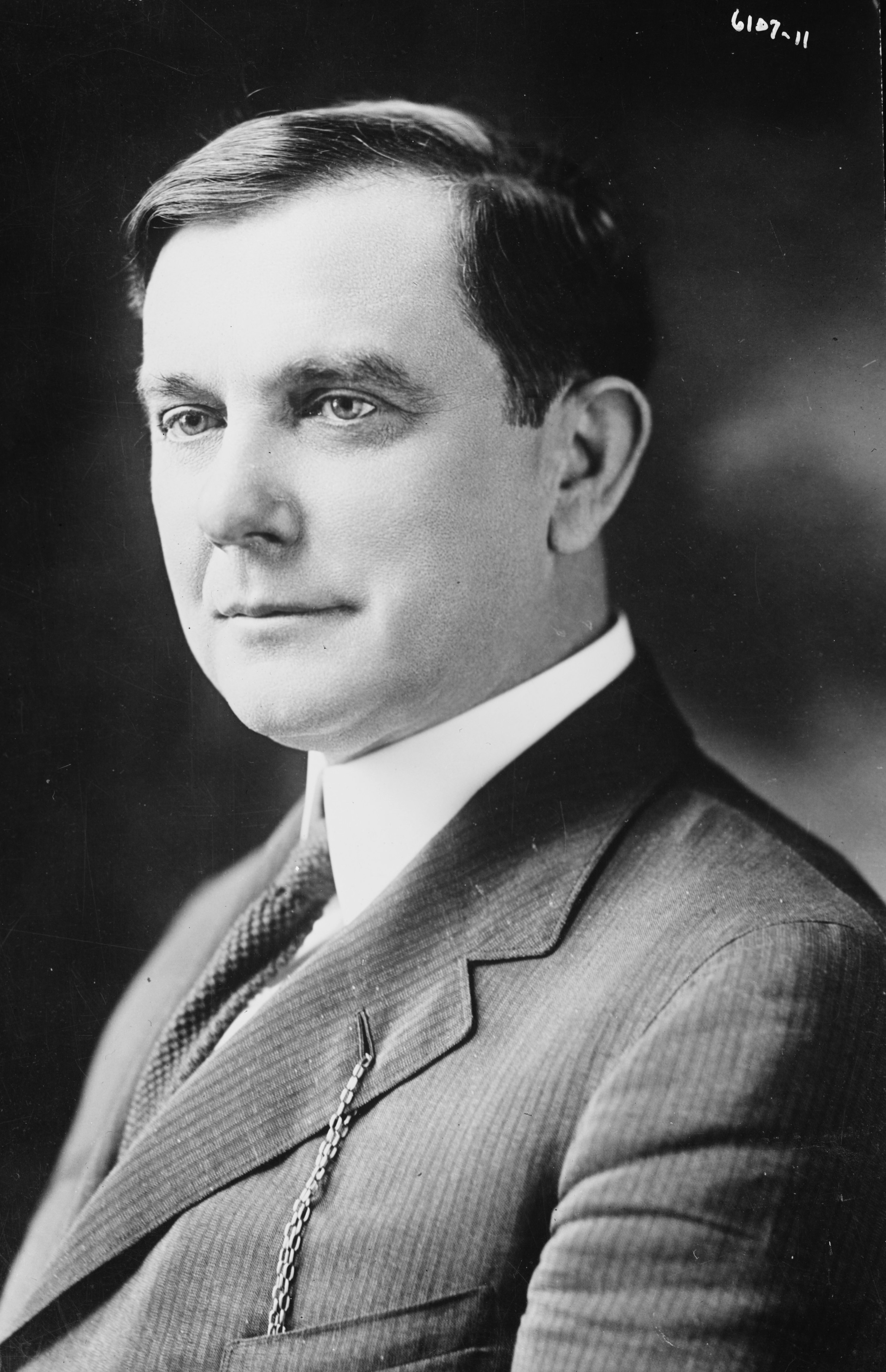

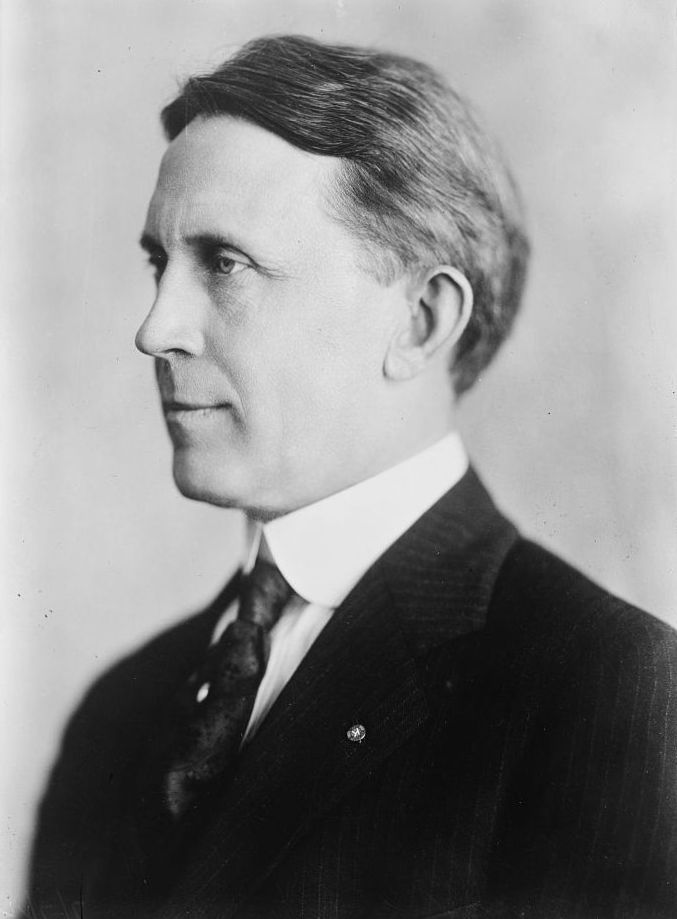
Nominee	Kenneth McKellar	Ben W. Hooper
Party	Democratic	Republican
Popular vote	143,718	118,174
Percentage	54.42%	44.75%
- County results McKellar: 40–50% 50–60% 60–70% 70–80% 80–90% >90% Hooper: 50–60% 60–70% 70–80% 80–90% >90%
U.S. senator before election
Luke Lea
Democratic
Elected U.S. senator
Kenneth McKellar
Democratic

1916 U.S. Senate election in Tennessee
Party	Candidate	Votes	%
Democratic	Kenneth McKellar (incumbent)	143,718	54.42%
Republican	Ben W. Hooper	118,174	44.75%
Socialist	H. H. Magnum	2,193	0.83%
Total votes		264,085	100.00%
Democratic hold			

== Texas ==
Incumbent Democrat Charles Culberson survived a challenge from former Governor Oscar Colquitt in the Democratic primary, then easily won the general election.

1916 United States Senate election in Texas
- November 7, 1916
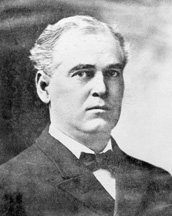

Nominee	Charles Culberson	Alex W. Atcheson	Thomas A. Hickey
Party	Democratic	Republican	Socialist
Popular vote	303,035	48,788	18,616
Percentage	81.30%	13.09%	4.99%
- County results Culberson: 50–60% 60–70% 70–80% 80–90% >90% Atcheson: 40–50% 50–60% 60–70% 80–90% No vote
U.S. senator before election
Charles Culberson
Democratic
Elected U.S. Senator
Charles Culberson
Democratic

1916 United States Senate election in Texas
Party	Candidate	Votes	%
Democratic	Charles A. Culberson (incumbent)	303,035	81.30%
Republican	Alex W. Atcheson	48,788	13.09%
Socialist	Thomas A. Hickey	18,616	4.99%
Prohibition	Edward H. Conibear	2,319	0.62%
Total votes		372,758	100.00%
Democratic hold			

== Utah ==
1916 United States Senate election in Utah
- November 7, 1916
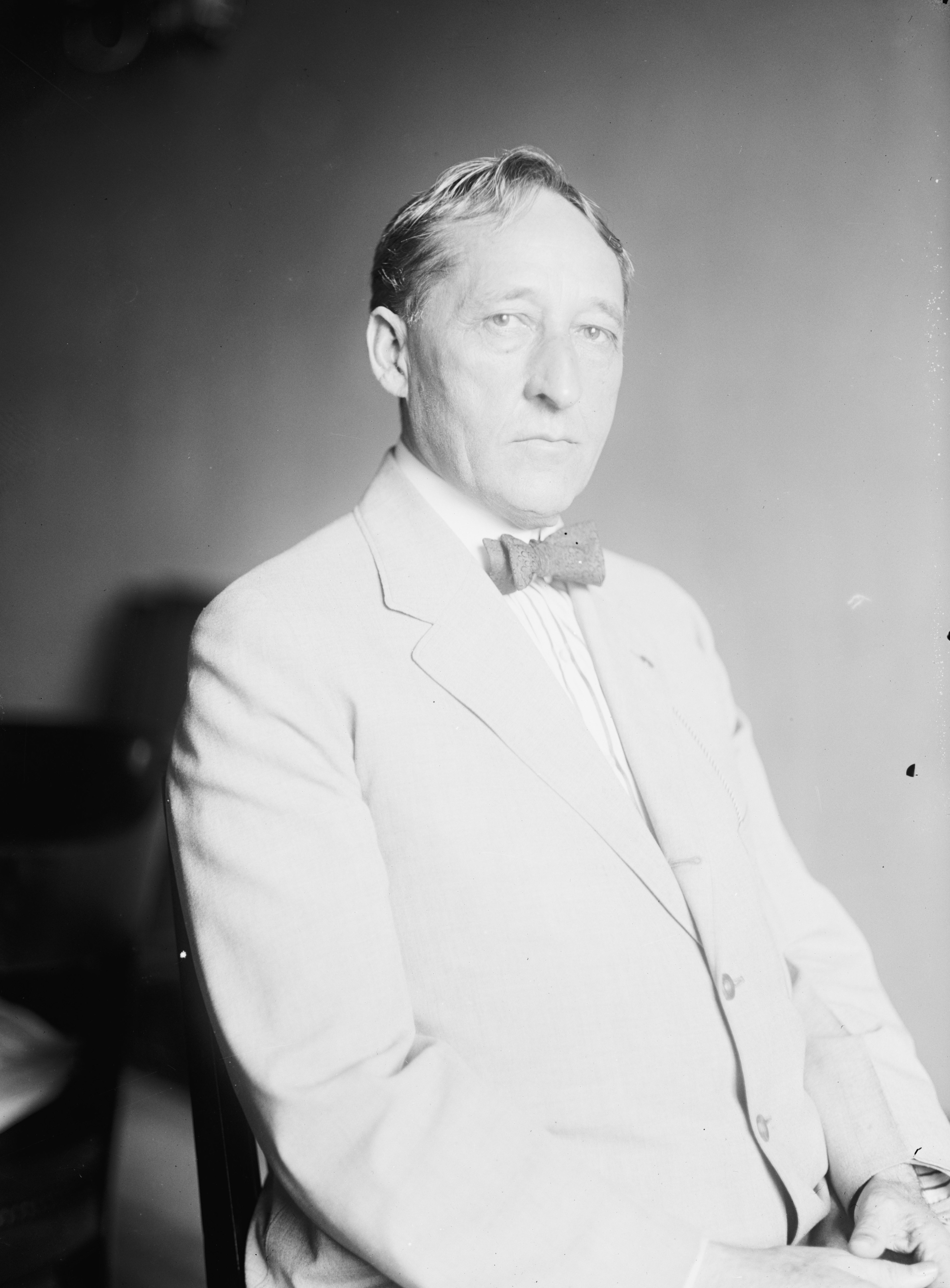

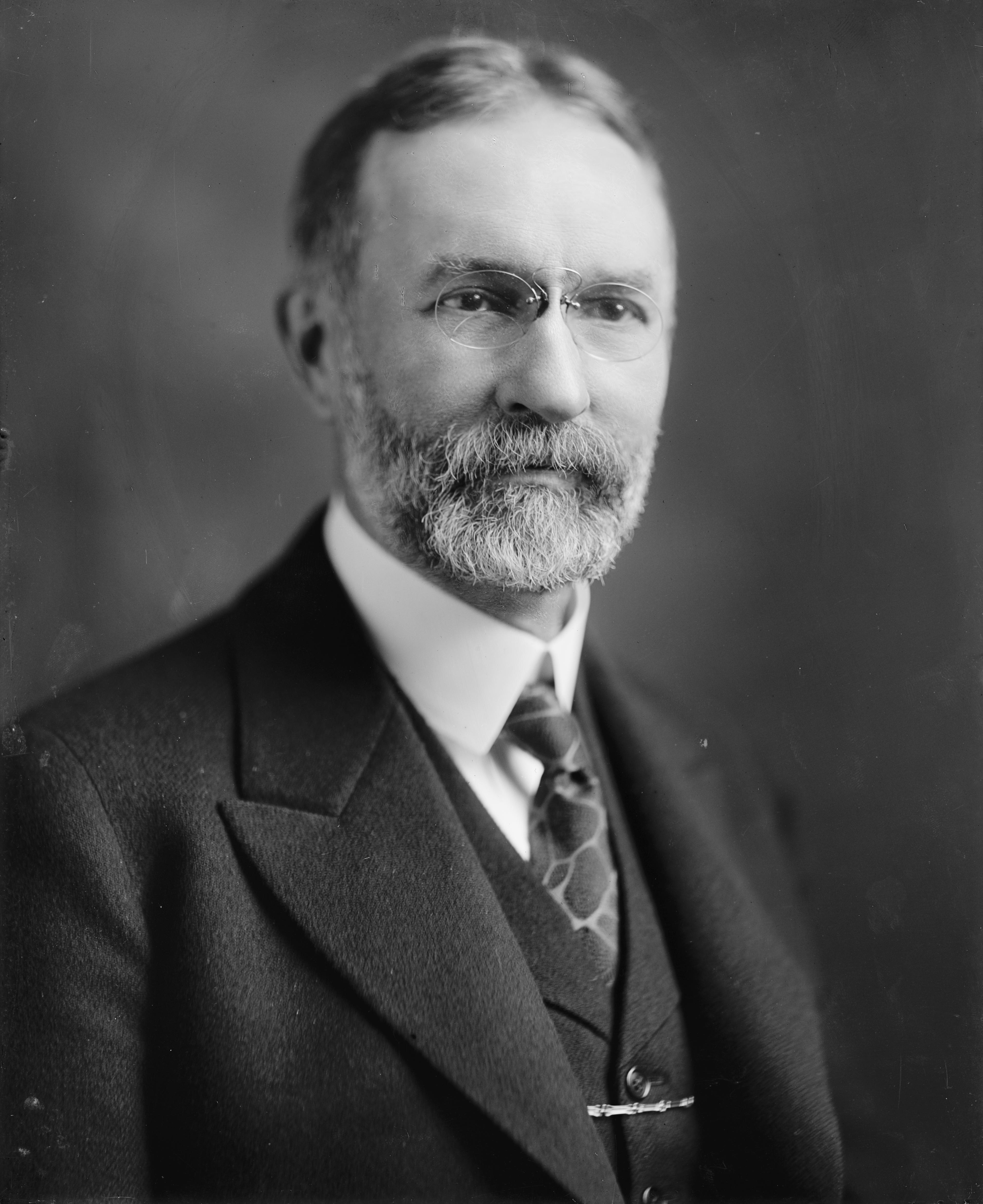
Nominee	William H. King	George Sutherland
Party	Democratic	Republican
Popular vote	81,057	56,862
Percentage	56.92%	39.93%
- County results King: 40–50% 50–60% 60–70% Sutherland: 50–60%
U.S. senator before election
George Sutherland
Republican
Elected U.S. Senator
William H. King
Democratic

General election results
Party	Candidate	Votes	%
Democratic	William H. King	81,057	56.92%
Republican	George Sutherland (incumbent)	56,862	39.93%
Socialist	Christian Poulson	4,497	3.16%
Democratic gain from Republican			

== Vermont ==
1916 United States Senate election in Vermont
- November 7, 1916
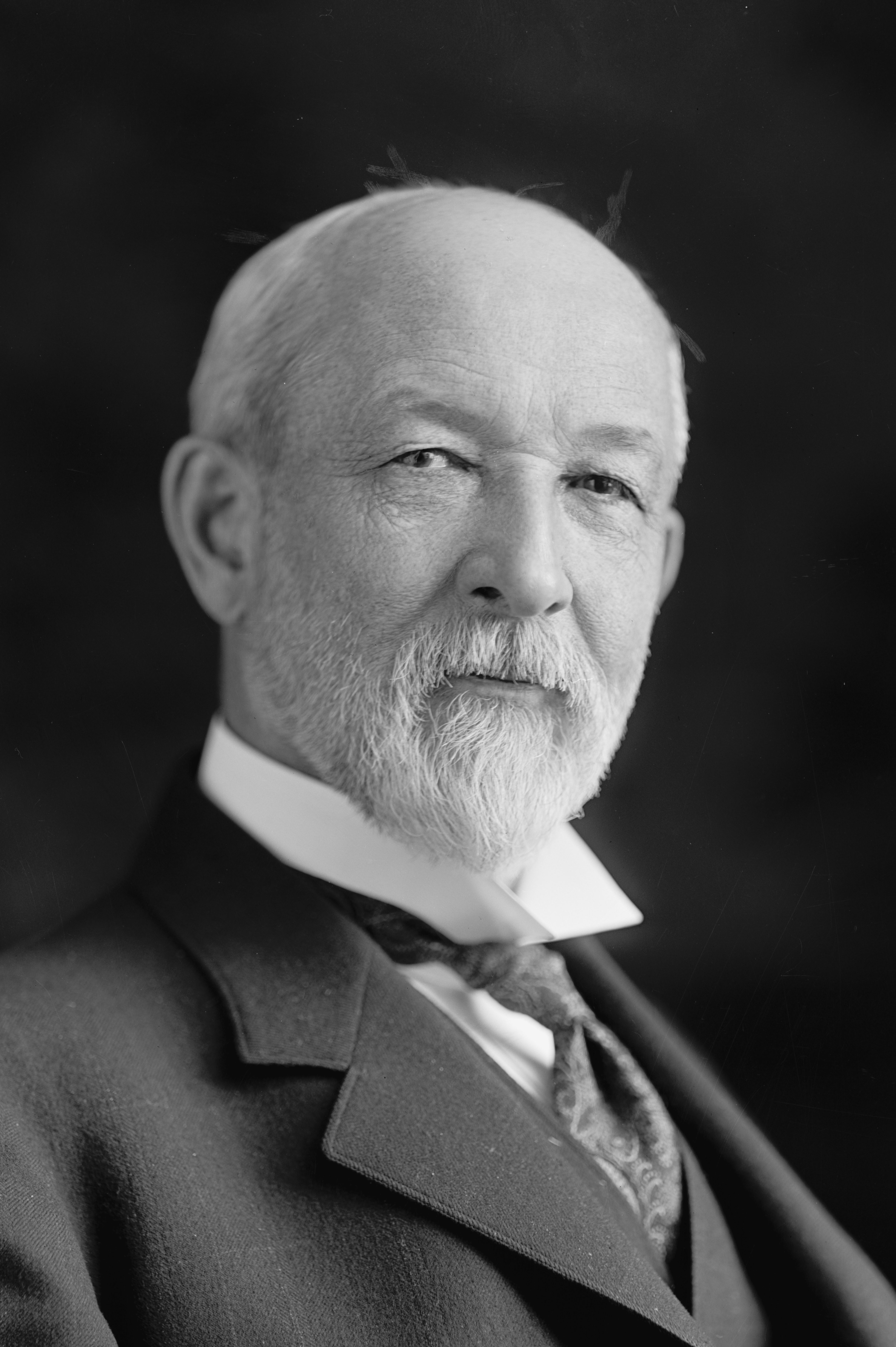

Nominee	Carroll S. Page	Oscar C. Miller
Party	Republican	Democratic
Popular vote	47,362	14,956
Percentage	74.4%	23.5%
- Page: 40–50% 50–60% 60–70% 70–80% 80–90% 90–100% Miller: 50–60%
U.S. senator before election
Carroll S. Page
Republican
Elected U.S. Senator
Carroll S. Page
Republican

United States Senate election in Vermont, 1916
Party	Candidate	Votes	%	±%
Republican	Carroll S. Page (inc.)	47,362	74.4	
Democratic	Oscar C. Miller	14,956	23.5	
Socialist	Norman E. Greenslet	1,336	2.1	
Total votes		63,654	100	

The 1916 United States Senate election in Vermont took place on November 7, 1916. It was the second direct election for the U.S. Senate to take place in Vermont following the ratification of the Seventeenth Amendment to the United States Constitution, and the first for Vermont's Class I seat. The incumbent, Republican Carroll S. Page, successfully ran for re-election to a second full term.

In the primary election held on September 11, Page gained re-nomination by winning 62 percent of the vote to defeat former governor Allen M. Fletcher (20.3) and current governor Charles W. Gates (17.7).

With the Republican Party dominant in Vermont, as it had been since its founding in the 1850s, Democratic candidate Oscar C. Miller was little more than a token opponent for Page. In the general election, Page defeated Miller 74.4 percent to 23.5.

== Virginia ==
1916 United States Senate election in Virginia
- November 7, 1916
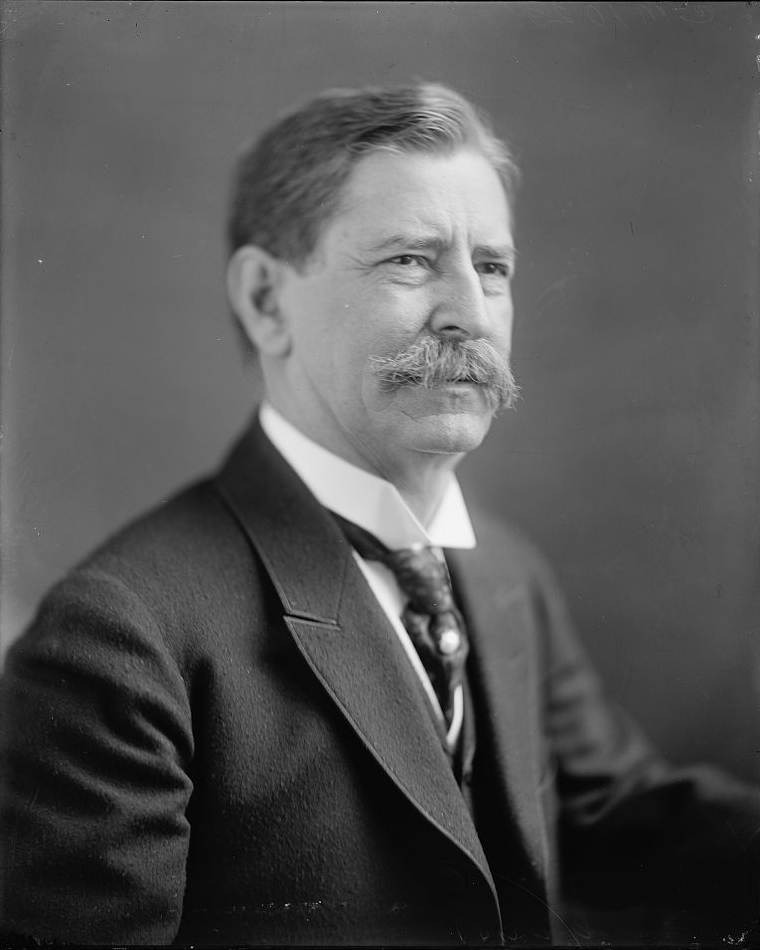
Nominee	Claude A. Swanson
Party	Democratic
Popular vote	133,061
Percentage	100.0%
U.S. senator before election
Claude A. Swanson
Democratic
Elected U.S. senator
Claude A. Swanson
Democratic

Virginia election
Party	Candidate	Votes	%
Democratic	Claude A. Swanson (incumbent)	133,061	100.00
Total votes		133,061	100.00
Democratic hold			

== Washington ==
1916 United States Senate election in Washington
- November 7, 1916
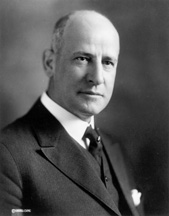

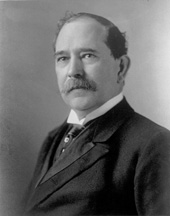
Nominee	Miles Poindexter	George Turner
Party	Republican	Democratic
Popular vote	202,287	135,339
Percentage	55.4%	37.1%
Nominee	Bruce Rogers
Party	Socialist
Popular vote	21,709
Percentage	6.0%
- County results Poindexter: 40–50% 50–60% 60–70% Turner: 40–50% 50–60%
U.S. senator before election
Miles Poindexter
Republican
Elected U.S. senator
Miles Poindexter
Republican

Washington election
Party	Candidate	Votes	%
Republican	Miles Poindexter (incumbent)	202,287	55.39
Democratic	George Turner	135,339	37.06
Socialist	Bruce Rogers	21,709	5.95
Prohibition	Joseph A. Campbell	4,411	1.21
Progressive	Walter J. Thompson	1,442	0.40
Majority		66,948	18.33
Total votes		365,188	100.00
Republican hold			

== West Virginia ==
1916 United States Senate election in West Virginia
- November 7, 1916
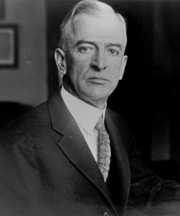

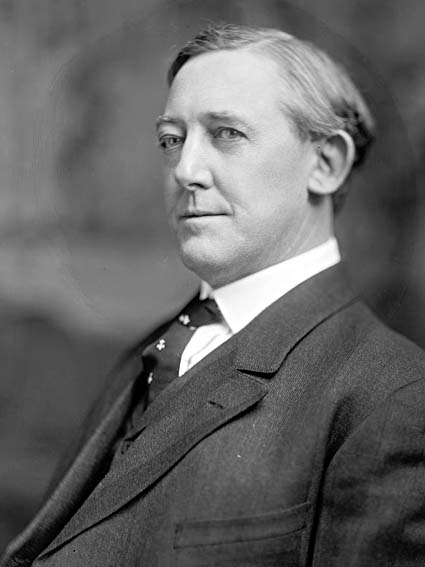
Nominee	Howard Sutherland	William E. Chilton
Party	Republican	Democratic
Popular vote	144,243	138,585
Percentage	50.1%	48.2%
- County results Sutherland: 40–50% 50–60% 60–70% 70–80% Chilton: 40–50% 50–60% 60–70% 70–80%
U.S. senator before election
William E. Chilton
Democratic
Elected U.S. senator
Howard Sutherland
Republican

West Virginia election
Party	Candidate	Votes	%
Republican	Howard Sutherland	144,243	50.14
Democratic	William E. Chilton (incumbent)	138,585	48.17
Socialist	G. A. Gneiser	4,881	1.70
Majority		5,658	1.97
Total votes		287,709	100.00
Republican gain from Democratic			

== Wisconsin ==
1916 United States Senate election in Wisconsin
- November 7, 1916
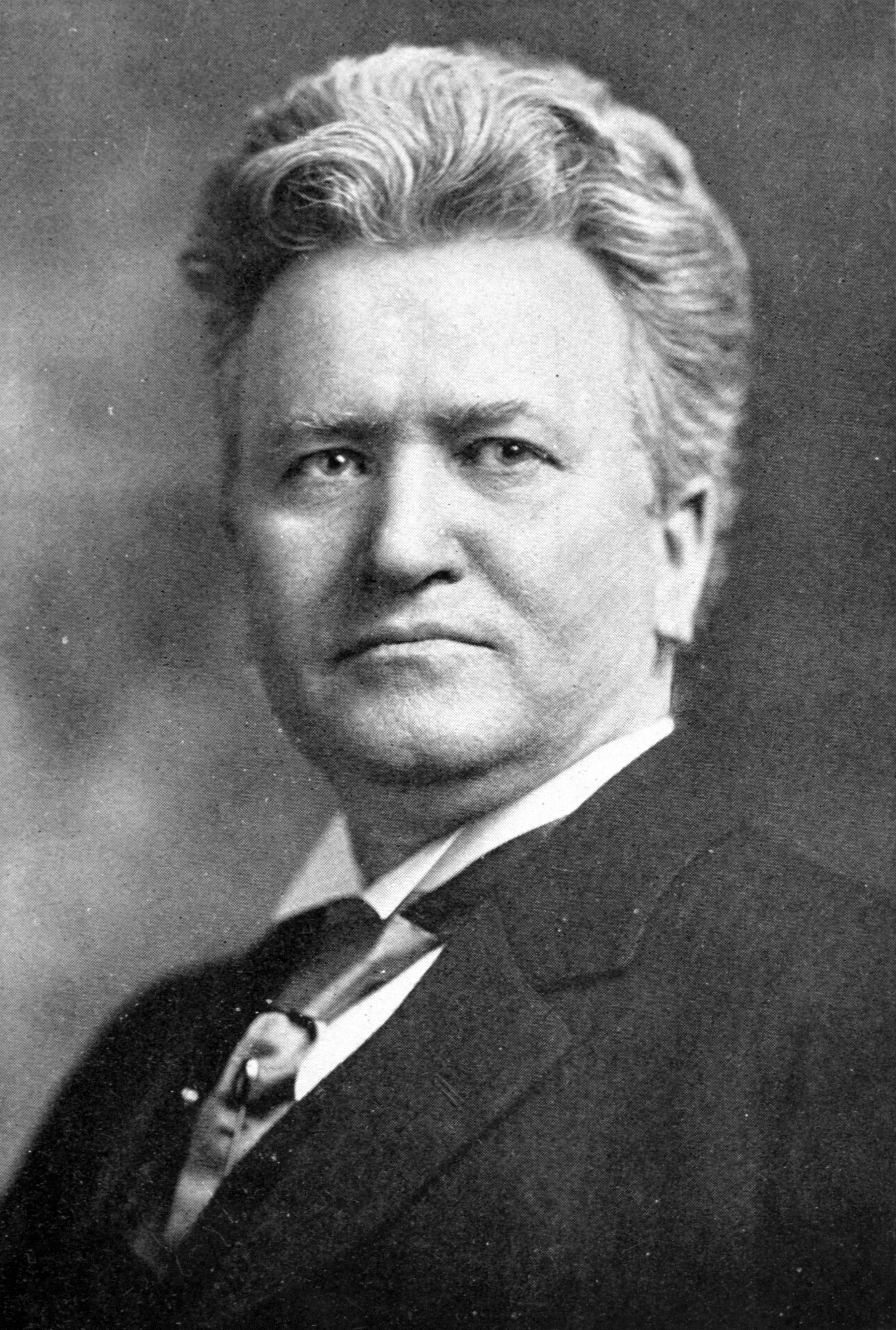

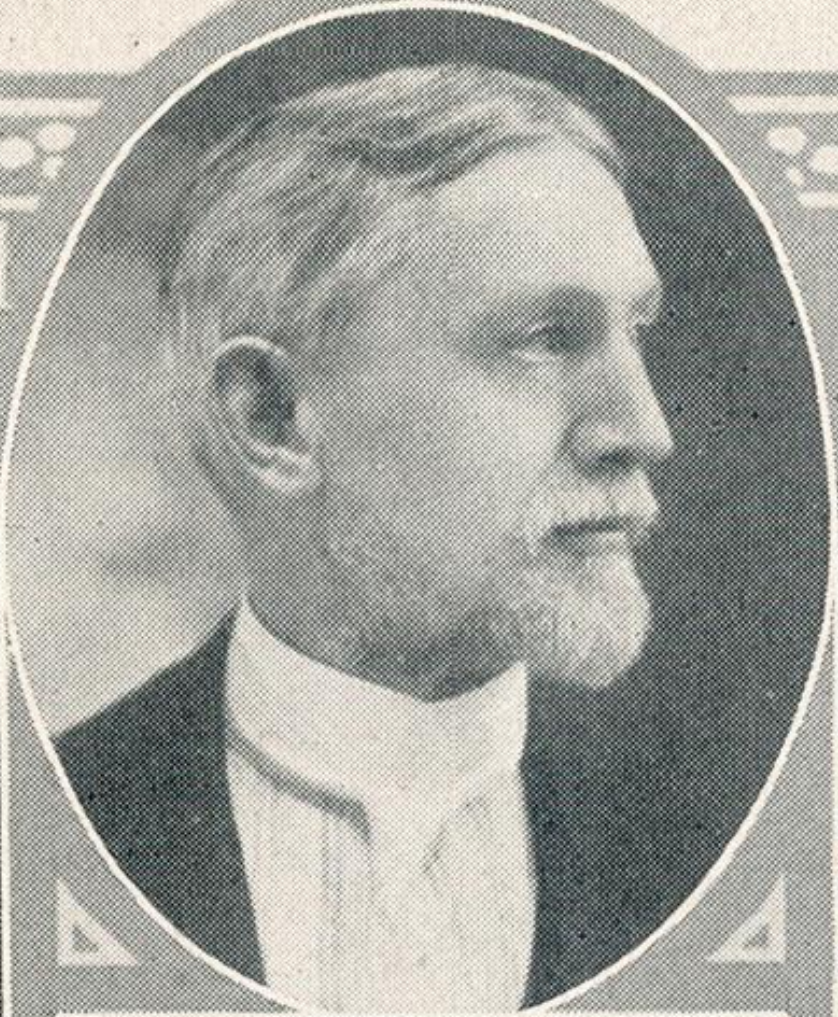
Nominee	Robert M. La Follette	William F. Wolfe	Richard Elsner
Party	Republican	Democratic	Socialist
Popular vote	249,906	134,611	28,908
Percentage	59.23%	31.90%	6.85%
- County results La Follette: 40–50% 50–60% 60–70% 70–80% 80–90% Wolfe: 40–50% 50–60%
U.S. senator before election
Robert M. La Follette
Republican
Elected U.S. Senator
Robert M. La Follette
Republican

Wisconsin election
Party	Candidate	Votes	%
Republican	Robert M. La Follette (incumbent)	249,906	59.23
Democratic	William F. Wolfe	134,611	31.90
Socialist	Richard Elsner	28,908	6.85
Prohibition	Charles L. Hill	8,528	2.02
Majority		115,295	27.32
Total votes		421,953	100.00
Republican hold			

== Wyoming ==
1916 United States Senate election in Wyoming
- November 7, 1916
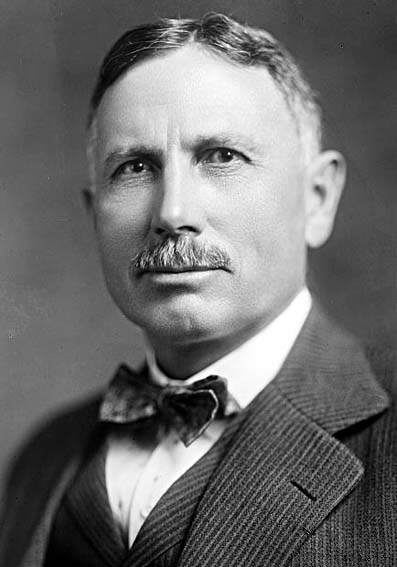

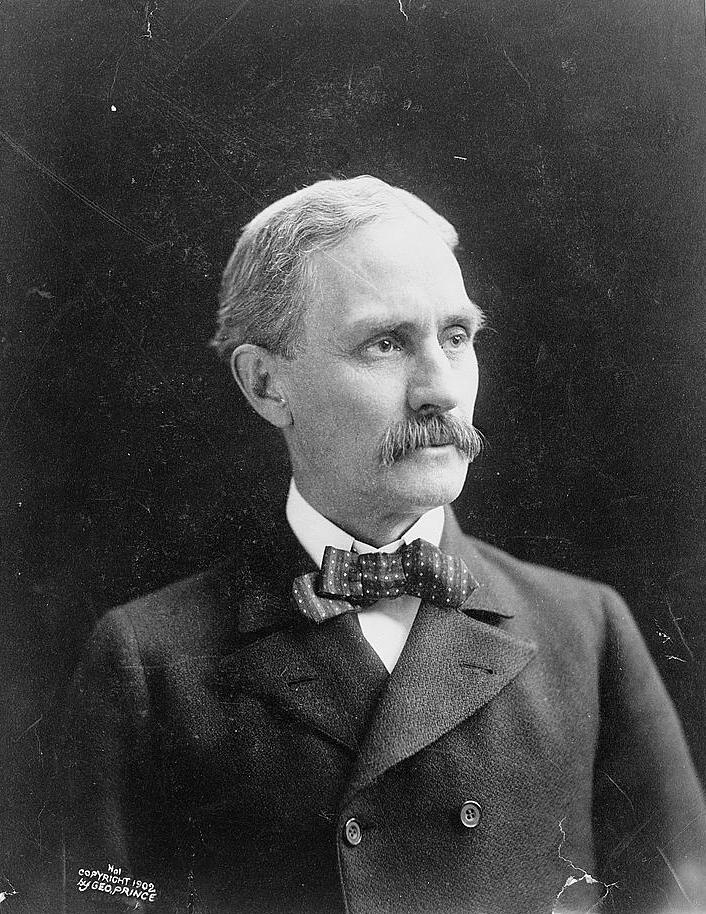
Nominee	John B. Kendrick	Clarence D. Clark
Party	Democratic	Republican
Popular vote	26,324	23,258
Percentage	51.5%	45.5%
- County results Kendrick: 40–50% 50–60% Clark: 40–50% 50–60% 70–80% No Data/Vote
U.S. senator before election
Clarence D. Clark
Republican
Elected U.S. senator
John B. Kendrick
Democratic

Wyoming election
Party	Candidate	Votes	%
Democratic	John B. Kendrick	26,324	51.47
Republican	Clarence D. Clark (incumbent)	23,258	45.47
Socialist	Paul L. Paulsen	1,334	2.61
Prohibition	Arthur B. Campbell	231	0.45
Majority		3,066	5.99
Total votes		51,147	100.00
Democratic gain from Republican			

== See also ==
- 1916 United States elections
  - 1916 United States House of Representatives elections
- 64th United States Congress
- 65th United States Congress
