= List of United States senators from New Jersey =

Current delegation

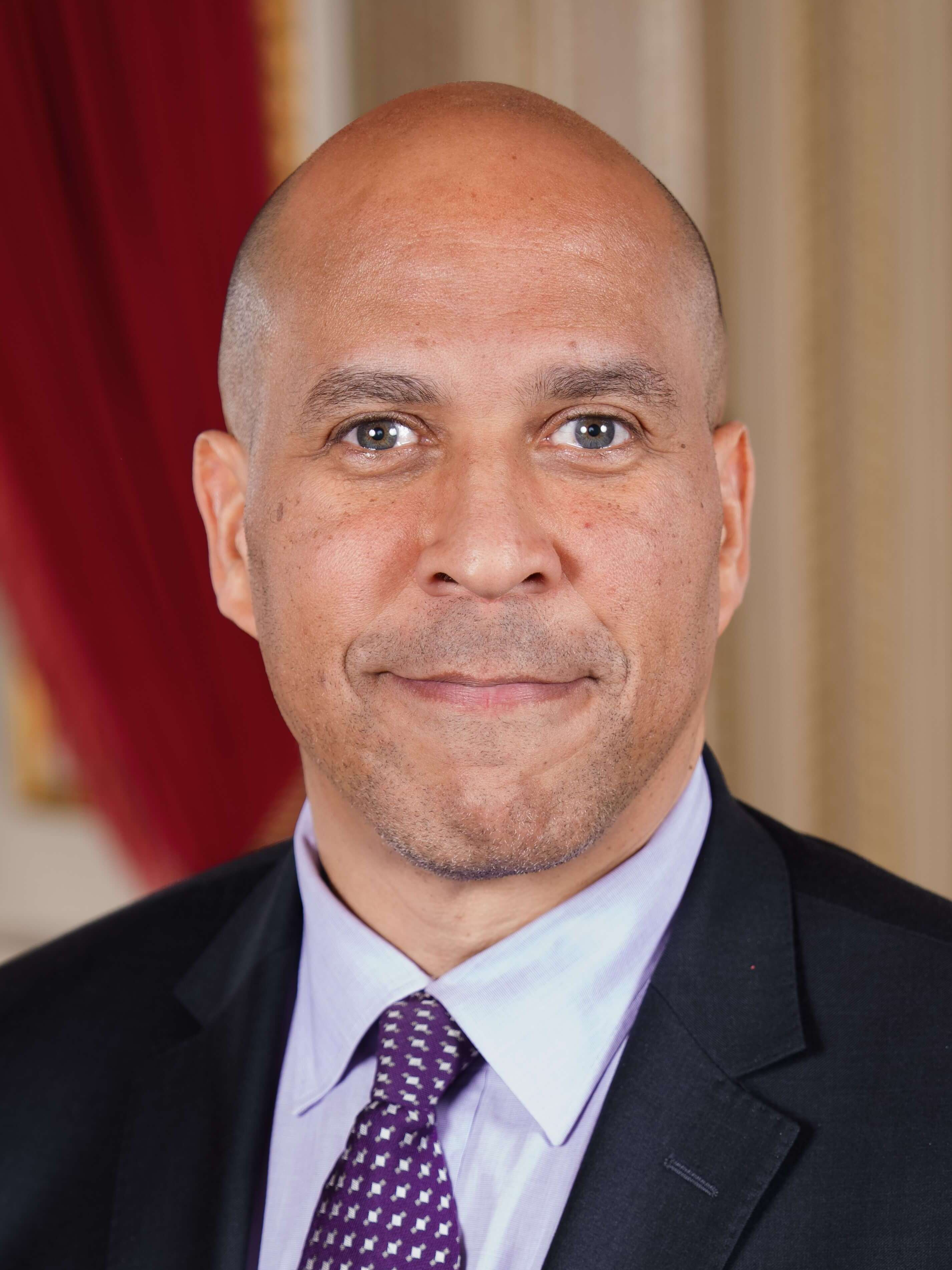
Cory Booker (D)

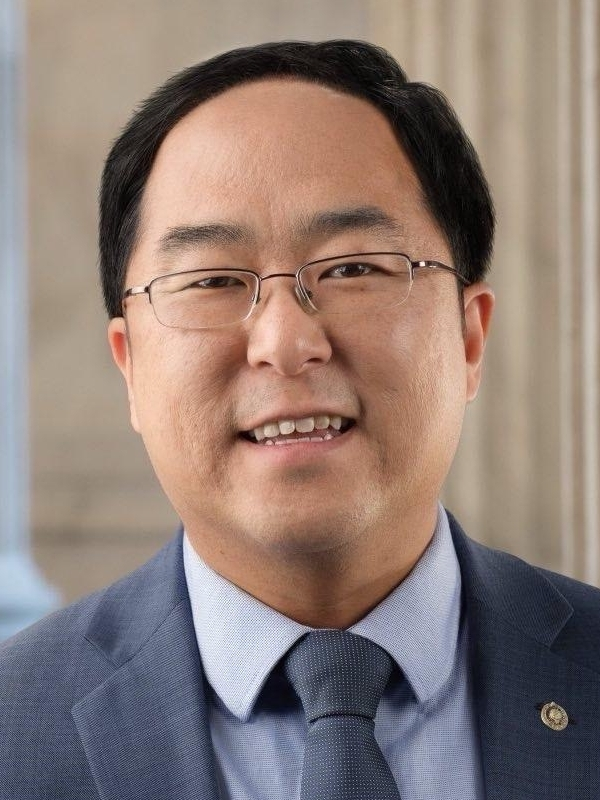
Andy Kim (D)

(ordered by seniority)

This is a chronological listing of the United States senators from New Jersey. Since the enforcement of the Seventeenth Amendment to the United States Constitution, U.S. senators are popularly elected for a six-year term beginning January 3. Elections are held the first Tuesday after November 1. Before 1914, they were chosen by the New Jersey Legislature, and before 1935, their terms began March 4. The state's current senators are Democrats Cory Booker (serving since 2013) and Andy Kim (serving since 2024). Frank Lautenberg was New Jersey's longest-serving senator (1982–2001; 2003–2013), having served five terms non-consecutively until his death in 2013.

== List of senators ==
Class 1 Class 1 senators belong to the electoral cycle that most recently had regular elections in 2006, 2012, 2018, and 2024. The next election will be in 2030.						C	Class 2 Class 2 senators belong to the electoral cycle that most recently had regular elections in 2008, 2014, 2020, and 2026. The next election will be in 2032.					
#	Senator	Party	Dates in office	Electoral history	T	C	T	Electoral history	Dates in office	Party	Senator	#
1	Jonathan Elmer (Bridgeton)	Pro- Admin.	Mar 4, 1789 – Mar 3, 1791	Elected in 1788.	1	1st	1	Elected in 1788. Resigned to become New Jersey Governor.	Mar 4, 1789 – Nov 13, 1790	Pro- Admin.	William Paterson (New Brunswick)	1
1	Jonathan Elmer (Bridgeton)	Pro- Admin.	Mar 4, 1789 – Mar 3, 1791	Elected in 1788.	1	1st	1		Nov 13, 1790 – Nov 23, 1790	Vacant		
1	Jonathan Elmer (Bridgeton)	Pro- Admin.	Mar 4, 1789 – Mar 3, 1791	Elected in 1788.	1	1st	1	Elected to finish Paterson's term. Retired.	Nov 23, 1790 – Mar 3, 1793	Pro- Admin.	Philemon Dickinson (Trenton)	2
2	John Rutherfurd (Green Township)	Pro- Admin.	Mar 4, 1791 – Dec 5, 1798	Elected in 1790.	2	2nd	1	Elected to finish Paterson's term. Retired.	Nov 23, 1790 – Mar 3, 1793	Pro- Admin.	Philemon Dickinson (Trenton)	2
2	John Rutherfurd (Green Township)	Pro- Admin.	Mar 4, 1791 – Dec 5, 1798	Elected in 1790.	2	3rd	2	Elected in 1792 or 1793. Resigned.	Mar 4, 1793 – Nov 12, 1796	Pro- Admin.	Frederick Frelinghuysen (Newark)	3
2	John Rutherfurd (Green Township)	Federalist	Mar 4, 1791 – Dec 5, 1798	Elected in 1790.	2	4th	2	Elected in 1792 or 1793. Resigned.	Mar 4, 1793 – Nov 12, 1796	Federalist	Frederick Frelinghuysen (Newark)	3
2	John Rutherfurd (Green Township)	Federalist	Mar 4, 1791 – Dec 5, 1798	Elected in 1790.	2	4th	2	Elected to finish Frelinghuysen's term. Retired.	Nov 12, 1796 – Mar 3, 1799	Federalist	Richard Stockton (Princeton)	4
2	John Rutherfurd (Green Township)	Federalist	Mar 4, 1791 – Dec 5, 1798	Re-elected in 1796. Resigned.	3	5th	2	Elected to finish Frelinghuysen's term. Retired.	Nov 12, 1796 – Mar 3, 1799	Federalist	Richard Stockton (Princeton)	4
3	Franklin Davenport (Woodbury)	Federalist	Dec 5, 1798 – Mar 3, 1799	Appointed to continue Rutherfurd's term.	3	5th	2	Elected to finish Frelinghuysen's term. Retired.	Nov 12, 1796 – Mar 3, 1799	Federalist	Richard Stockton (Princeton)	4
4	James Schureman (New Brunswick)	Federalist	Mar 4, 1799 – Feb 16, 1801	Elected to finish Rutherfurd's term. Resigned.	3	6th	3	Elected in 1798. Lost re-election.	Mar 4, 1799– Mar 3, 1805	Federalist	Jonathan Dayton (Elizabethtown)	5
Vacant			Feb 16, 1801 – Feb 28, 1801		3	6th	3	Elected in 1798. Lost re-election.	Mar 4, 1799– Mar 3, 1805	Federalist	Jonathan Dayton (Elizabethtown)	5
5	Aaron Ogden (Elizabethtown)	Federalist	Feb 28, 1801 – Mar 3, 1803	Elected to finish Rutherfurd's term. Lost re-election.	3	6th	3	Elected in 1798. Lost re-election.	Mar 4, 1799– Mar 3, 1805	Federalist	Jonathan Dayton (Elizabethtown)	5
5	Aaron Ogden (Elizabethtown)	Federalist	Feb 28, 1801 – Mar 3, 1803	Elected to finish Rutherfurd's term. Lost re-election.	3	7th	3	Elected in 1798. Lost re-election.	Mar 4, 1799– Mar 3, 1805	Federalist	Jonathan Dayton (Elizabethtown)	5
Vacant			Mar 4, 1803 – Sep 1, 1803	Legislature failed to elect.	4	8th	3	Elected in 1798. Lost re-election.	Mar 4, 1799– Mar 3, 1805	Federalist	Jonathan Dayton (Elizabethtown)	5
6	John Condit (Orange)	Democratic- Republican	Sep 1, 1803 – Mar 3, 1809	Appointed to begin the vacant term. Elected in 1803 to finish the vacant term. Lost renomination.	4	8th	3	Elected in 1798. Lost re-election.	Mar 4, 1799– Mar 3, 1805	Federalist	Jonathan Dayton (Elizabethtown)	5
6	John Condit (Orange)	Democratic- Republican	Sep 1, 1803 – Mar 3, 1809	Appointed to begin the vacant term. Elected in 1803 to finish the vacant term. Lost renomination.	4	9th	4	Elected in 1804. Resigned.	Mar 4, 1805 – Mar 12, 1809	Democratic- Republican	Aaron Kitchell (Hanover Township)	6
6	John Condit (Orange)	Democratic- Republican	Sep 1, 1803 – Mar 3, 1809	Appointed to begin the vacant term. Elected in 1803 to finish the vacant term. Lost renomination.	4	10th	4	Elected in 1804. Resigned.	Mar 4, 1805 – Mar 12, 1809	Democratic- Republican	Aaron Kitchell (Hanover Township)	6
7	John Lambert (Lambertville)	Democratic- Republican	Mar 4, 1809 – Mar 3, 1815	Elected in 1808. Lost re-election.	5	11th	4	Elected in 1804. Resigned.	Mar 4, 1805 – Mar 12, 1809	Democratic- Republican	Aaron Kitchell (Hanover Township)	6
7	John Lambert (Lambertville)	Democratic- Republican	Mar 4, 1809 – Mar 3, 1815	Elected in 1808. Lost re-election.	5	11th	4		Mar 12, 1809 – Mar 21, 1809	Vacant		
7	John Lambert (Lambertville)	Democratic- Republican	Mar 4, 1809 – Mar 3, 1815	Elected in 1808. Lost re-election.	5	11th	4	Appointed to continue Kitchell's term Elected in 1809 to finish Kitchell's term.	Mar 21, 1809 – Mar 3, 1817	Democratic- Republican	John Condit (Orange)	7
7	John Lambert (Lambertville)	Democratic- Republican	Mar 4, 1809 – Mar 3, 1815	Elected in 1808. Lost re-election.	5	12th	5	Re-elected in 1810.	Mar 21, 1809 – Mar 3, 1817	Democratic- Republican	John Condit (Orange)	7
7	John Lambert (Lambertville)	Democratic- Republican	Mar 4, 1809 – Mar 3, 1815	Elected in 1808. Lost re-election.	5	13th	5	Re-elected in 1810.	Mar 21, 1809 – Mar 3, 1817	Democratic- Republican	John Condit (Orange)	7
8	James J. Wilson (Trenton)	Democratic- Republican	Mar 4, 1815 – Jan 8, 1821	Elected in 1815. Lost re-election, resigned early.	6	14th	5	Re-elected in 1810.	Mar 21, 1809 – Mar 3, 1817	Democratic- Republican	John Condit (Orange)	7
8	James J. Wilson (Trenton)	Democratic- Republican	Mar 4, 1815 – Jan 8, 1821	Elected in 1815. Lost re-election, resigned early.	6	15th	6	Elected in 1817.	Mar 4, 1817 – Jan 30, 1829	Democratic- Republican	Mahlon Dickerson (Succasunna)	8
8	James J. Wilson (Trenton)	Democratic- Republican	Mar 4, 1815 – Jan 8, 1821	Elected in 1815. Lost re-election, resigned early.	6	16th	6	Elected in 1817.	Mar 4, 1817 – Jan 30, 1829	Democratic- Republican	Mahlon Dickerson (Succasunna)	8
Vacant			Jan 8, 1821 – Jan 26, 1821		6	16th	6	Elected in 1817.	Mar 4, 1817 – Jan 30, 1829	Democratic- Republican	Mahlon Dickerson (Succasunna)	8
9	Samuel L. Southard (Trenton)	Democratic- Republican	Jan 26, 1821 – Mar 3, 1823	Appointed to finish Wilson's term, having been elected to the next term.	6	16th	6	Elected in 1817.	Mar 4, 1817 – Jan 30, 1829	Democratic- Republican	Mahlon Dickerson (Succasunna)	8
9	Samuel L. Southard (Trenton)	Democratic- Republican	Jan 26, 1821 – Mar 3, 1823	Elected in 1820. Resigned to become U.S. Secretary of the Navy.	7	17th	6	Elected in 1817.	Mar 4, 1817 – Jan 30, 1829	Democratic- Republican	Mahlon Dickerson (Succasunna)	8
Vacant			Mar 4, 1823 – Nov 12, 1823		7	18th	7	Re-elected in 1823. Resigned and immediately re-elected for the class 1 seat.	Mar 4, 1817 – Jan 30, 1829	Democratic- Republican	Mahlon Dickerson (Succasunna)	8
10	Joseph McIlvaine (Burlington)	Democratic-Republican	Nov 12, 1823 – Aug 19, 1826	Elected to finish Southard's term. Died.	7	18th	7	Re-elected in 1823. Resigned and immediately re-elected for the class 1 seat.	Mar 4, 1817 – Jan 30, 1829	Democratic- Republican	Mahlon Dickerson (Succasunna)	8
10	Joseph McIlvaine (Burlington)	National; Republican	Nov 12, 1823 – Aug 19, 1826	Elected to finish Southard's term. Died.	7	19th	7	Re-elected in 1823. Resigned and immediately re-elected for the class 1 seat.	Mar 4, 1817 – Jan 30, 1829	Jacksonian	Mahlon Dickerson (Succasunna)	8
Vacant			Aug 19, 1826 – Nov 10, 1826		7	19th	7	Re-elected in 1823. Resigned and immediately re-elected for the class 1 seat.	Mar 4, 1817 – Jan 30, 1829	Jacksonian	Mahlon Dickerson (Succasunna)	8
11	Ephraim Bateman (Cedarville)	National; Republican	Nov 10, 1826 – Jan 12, 1829	Elected to finish Southard's term.	7	19th	7	Re-elected in 1823. Resigned and immediately re-elected for the class 1 seat.	Mar 4, 1817 – Jan 30, 1829	Jacksonian	Mahlon Dickerson (Succasunna)	8
11	Ephraim Bateman (Cedarville)	National; Republican	Nov 10, 1826 – Jan 12, 1829	Elected to full term in 1826. Resigned because of failing health.	8	20th	7	Re-elected in 1823. Resigned and immediately re-elected for the class 1 seat.	Mar 4, 1817 – Jan 30, 1829	Jacksonian	Mahlon Dickerson (Succasunna)	8
Vacant			Jan 12, 1829 – Jan 30, 1829		8	20th	7	Re-elected in 1823. Resigned and immediately re-elected for the class 1 seat.	Mar 4, 1817 – Jan 30, 1829	Jacksonian	Mahlon Dickerson (Succasunna)	8
12	Mahlon Dickerson (Succasunna)	Jacksonian	Jan 30, 1829 – Mar 3, 1833	Elected to finish Bateman's term.	8	20th	7		Jan 30, 1829 – Mar 3, 1829	Vacant		
12	Mahlon Dickerson (Succasunna)	Jacksonian	Jan 30, 1829 – Mar 3, 1833	Elected to finish Bateman's term.	8	21st	8	Elected in 1829.	Mar 4, 1829 – Mar 3, 1835	National; Republican	Theodore Frelinghuysen (Newark)	9
12	Mahlon Dickerson (Succasunna)	Jacksonian	Jan 30, 1829 – Mar 3, 1833	Elected to finish Bateman's term.	8	22nd	8	Elected in 1829.	Mar 4, 1829 – Mar 3, 1835	National; Republican	Theodore Frelinghuysen (Newark)	9
13	Samuel L. Southard (Trenton)	National; Republican	Mar 4, 1833 – Jun 26, 1842	Elected in 1833.	9	23rd	8	Elected in 1829.	Mar 4, 1829 – Mar 3, 1835	National; Republican	Theodore Frelinghuysen (Newark)	9
13	Samuel L. Southard (Trenton)	National; Republican	Mar 4, 1833 – Jun 26, 1842	Elected in 1833.	9	24th	9	Elected in 1835. Lost re-election.	Mar 4, 1835 – Mar 3, 1841	Jacksonian	Garret D. Wall (Burlington)	10
13	Samuel L. Southard (Trenton)	Whig	Mar 4, 1833 – Jun 26, 1842	Elected in 1833.	9	25th	9	Elected in 1835. Lost re-election.	Mar 4, 1835 – Mar 3, 1841	Democratic	Garret D. Wall (Burlington)	10
13	Samuel L. Southard (Trenton)	Whig	Mar 4, 1833 – Jun 26, 1842	Re-elected in 1839. Resigned due to failing health.	10	26th	9	Elected in 1835. Lost re-election.	Mar 4, 1835 – Mar 3, 1841	Democratic	Garret D. Wall (Burlington)	10
13	Samuel L. Southard (Trenton)	Whig	Mar 4, 1833 – Jun 26, 1842	Re-elected in 1839. Resigned due to failing health.	10	27th	10	Elected in 1840.	Mar 4, 1841 – Mar 3, 1853	Whig	Jacob W. Miller (Morristown)	11
Vacant			Jun 26, 1842 – Jul 2, 1842		10	27th	10	Elected in 1840.	Mar 4, 1841 – Mar 3, 1853	Whig	Jacob W. Miller (Morristown)	11
14	William L. Dayton (Trenton)	Whig	Jul 2, 1842 – Mar 3, 1851	Appointed to continue Southard's term. Elected to finish Southard's term.	10	27th	10	Elected in 1840.	Mar 4, 1841 – Mar 3, 1853	Whig	Jacob W. Miller (Morristown)	11
14	William L. Dayton (Trenton)	Whig	Jul 2, 1842 – Mar 3, 1851	Appointed to continue Southard's term. Elected to finish Southard's term.	10	28th	10	Elected in 1840.	Mar 4, 1841 – Mar 3, 1853	Whig	Jacob W. Miller (Morristown)	11
14	William L. Dayton (Trenton)	Whig	Jul 2, 1842 – Mar 3, 1851	Re-elected in 1845. Lost re-election.	11	29th	10	Elected in 1840.	Mar 4, 1841 – Mar 3, 1853	Whig	Jacob W. Miller (Morristown)	11
14	William L. Dayton (Trenton)	Whig	Jul 2, 1842 – Mar 3, 1851	Re-elected in 1845. Lost re-election.	11	30th	11	Re-elected in 1846. Lost re-election.	Mar 4, 1841 – Mar 3, 1853	Whig	Jacob W. Miller (Morristown)	11
14	William L. Dayton (Trenton)	Whig	Jul 2, 1842 – Mar 3, 1851	Re-elected in 1845. Lost re-election.	11	31st	11	Re-elected in 1846. Lost re-election.	Mar 4, 1841 – Mar 3, 1853	Whig	Jacob W. Miller (Morristown)	11
15	Robert F. Stockton (Princeton)	Democratic	Mar 4, 1851 – Jan 10, 1853	Elected in 1851. Resigned to become President of the Delaware and Raritan Canal Company.	12	32nd	11	Re-elected in 1846. Lost re-election.	Mar 4, 1841 – Mar 3, 1853	Whig	Jacob W. Miller (Morristown)	11
Vacant			Jan 10, 1853 – Mar 4, 1853		12	32nd	11	Re-elected in 1846. Lost re-election.	Mar 4, 1841 – Mar 3, 1853	Whig	Jacob W. Miller (Morristown)	11
16	John Renshaw Thomson (Princeton)	Democratic	Mar 4, 1853 – Sep 12, 1862	Elected to finish Stockton's term.	12	33rd	12	Elected in 1853. Lost re-election.	Mar 4, 1853 – Mar 3, 1859	Democratic	William Wright (Newark)	12
16	John Renshaw Thomson (Princeton)	Democratic	Mar 4, 1853 – Sep 12, 1862	Elected to finish Stockton's term.	12	34th	12	Elected in 1853. Lost re-election.	Mar 4, 1853 – Mar 3, 1859	Democratic	William Wright (Newark)	12
16	John Renshaw Thomson (Princeton)	Democratic	Mar 4, 1853 – Sep 12, 1862	Re-elected in 1857. Died.	13	35th	12	Elected in 1853. Lost re-election.	Mar 4, 1853 – Mar 3, 1859	Democratic	William Wright (Newark)	12
16	John Renshaw Thomson (Princeton)	Democratic	Mar 4, 1853 – Sep 12, 1862	Re-elected in 1857. Died.	13	36th	13	Elected in 1858. Lost re-election.	Mar 4, 1859 – Mar 3, 1865	Republican	John C. Ten Eyck (Mount Holly)	13
16	John Renshaw Thomson (Princeton)	Democratic	Mar 4, 1853 – Sep 12, 1862	Re-elected in 1857. Died.	13	37th	13	Elected in 1858. Lost re-election.	Mar 4, 1859 – Mar 3, 1865	Republican	John C. Ten Eyck (Mount Holly)	13
Vacant			Sep 12, 1862 – Nov 21, 1862		13	37th	13	Elected in 1858. Lost re-election.	Mar 4, 1859 – Mar 3, 1865	Republican	John C. Ten Eyck (Mount Holly)	13
17	Richard Stockton Field (Princeton)	Republican	Nov 21, 1862 – Jan 14, 1863	Appointed to continue Thomson's term. Retired when his successor was elected.	13	37th	13	Elected in 1858. Lost re-election.	Mar 4, 1859 – Mar 3, 1865	Republican	John C. Ten Eyck (Mount Holly)	13
18	James Walter Wall (Burlington)	Democratic	Jan 14, 1863 – Mar 3, 1863	Elected to finish Thomson's term. Lost re-election.	13	37th	13	Elected in 1858. Lost re-election.	Mar 4, 1859 – Mar 3, 1865	Republican	John C. Ten Eyck (Mount Holly)	13
19	William Wright (Newark)	Democratic	Mar 4, 1863 – Nov 1, 1866	Elected in 1863. Died.	14	38th	13	Elected in 1858. Lost re-election.	Mar 4, 1859 – Mar 3, 1865	Republican	John C. Ten Eyck (Mount Holly)	13
19	William Wright (Newark)	Democratic	Mar 4, 1863 – Nov 1, 1866	Elected in 1863. Died.	14	39th	14		Mar 3, 1865– Mar 15, 1865	Vacant		
19	William Wright (Newark)	Democratic	Mar 4, 1863 – Nov 1, 1866	Elected in 1863. Died.	14	39th	14	Elected in 1864. Election disputed and seat declared vacant.	Mar 15, 1865 – Mar 27, 1866	Democratic	John P. Stockton (Trenton)	14
19	William Wright (Newark)	Democratic	Mar 4, 1863 – Nov 1, 1866	Elected in 1863. Died.	14	39th	14		Mar 27, 1866 – Sep 19, 1866	Vacant		
19	William Wright (Newark)	Democratic	Mar 4, 1863 – Nov 1, 1866	Elected in 1863. Died.	14	39th	14	Elected to finish Stockton's term. Retired.	Sep 19, 1866 – Mar 3, 1871	Republican	Alexander G. Cattell (Camden)	15
Vacant			Nov 1, 1866 – Nov 12, 1866		14	39th	14	Elected to finish Stockton's term. Retired.	Sep 19, 1866 – Mar 3, 1871	Republican	Alexander G. Cattell (Camden)	15
20	Frederick T. Frelinghuysen (Newark)	Republican	Nov 12, 1866 – Mar 3, 1869	Appointed to continue Wright's term. Elected in 1867 to finish Wright's term. Lost re-election.	14	39th	14	Elected to finish Stockton's term. Retired.	Sep 19, 1866 – Mar 3, 1871	Republican	Alexander G. Cattell (Camden)	15
20	Frederick T. Frelinghuysen (Newark)	Republican	Nov 12, 1866 – Mar 3, 1869	Appointed to continue Wright's term. Elected in 1867 to finish Wright's term. Lost re-election.	14	40th	14	Elected to finish Stockton's term. Retired.	Sep 19, 1866 – Mar 3, 1871	Republican	Alexander G. Cattell (Camden)	15
21	John P. Stockton (Trenton)	Democratic	Mar 4, 1869 – Mar 3, 1875	Elected in 1869. Lost renomination.	15	41st	14	Elected to finish Stockton's term. Retired.	Sep 19, 1866 – Mar 3, 1871	Republican	Alexander G. Cattell (Camden)	15
21	John P. Stockton (Trenton)	Democratic	Mar 4, 1869 – Mar 3, 1875	Elected in 1869. Lost renomination.	15	42nd	15	Elected in 1870 or 1871. Lost re-election.	Mar 4, 1871– Mar 3, 1877	Republican	Frederick T. Frelinghuysen (Newark)	16
21	John P. Stockton (Trenton)	Democratic	Mar 4, 1869 – Mar 3, 1875	Elected in 1869. Lost renomination.	15	43rd	15	Elected in 1870 or 1871. Lost re-election.	Mar 4, 1871– Mar 3, 1877	Republican	Frederick T. Frelinghuysen (Newark)	16
22	Theodore F. Randolph (Morristown)	Democratic	Mar 4, 1875 – Mar 3, 1881	Elected in 1875.	16	44th	15	Elected in 1870 or 1871. Lost re-election.	Mar 4, 1871– Mar 3, 1877	Republican	Frederick T. Frelinghuysen (Newark)	16
22	Theodore F. Randolph (Morristown)	Democratic	Mar 4, 1875 – Mar 3, 1881	Elected in 1875.	16	45th	16	Elected in 1877.	Mar 4, 1877– Mar 3, 1895	Democratic	John R. McPherson (Jersey City)	17
22	Theodore F. Randolph (Morristown)	Democratic	Mar 4, 1875 – Mar 3, 1881	Elected in 1875.	16	46th	16	Elected in 1877.	Mar 4, 1877– Mar 3, 1895	Democratic	John R. McPherson (Jersey City)	17
23	William J. Sewell (Camden)	Republican	Mar 4, 1881 – Mar 3, 1887	Elected in 1881. Lost re-election.	17	47th	16	Elected in 1877.	Mar 4, 1877– Mar 3, 1895	Democratic	John R. McPherson (Jersey City)	17
23	William J. Sewell (Camden)	Republican	Mar 4, 1881 – Mar 3, 1887	Elected in 1881. Lost re-election.	17	48th	17	Re-elected in 1883.	Mar 4, 1877– Mar 3, 1895	Democratic	John R. McPherson (Jersey City)	17
23	William J. Sewell (Camden)	Republican	Mar 4, 1881 – Mar 3, 1887	Elected in 1881. Lost re-election.	17	49th	17	Re-elected in 1883.	Mar 4, 1877– Mar 3, 1895	Democratic	John R. McPherson (Jersey City)	17
24	Rufus Blodgett (Long Branch)	Democratic	Mar 4, 1887 – Mar 3, 1893	Elected in 1886. Retired.	18	50th	17	Re-elected in 1883.	Mar 4, 1877– Mar 3, 1895	Democratic	John R. McPherson (Jersey City)	17
24	Rufus Blodgett (Long Branch)	Democratic	Mar 4, 1887 – Mar 3, 1893	Elected in 1886. Retired.	18	51st	18	Re-elected in 1889.	Mar 4, 1877– Mar 3, 1895	Democratic	John R. McPherson (Jersey City)	17
24	Rufus Blodgett (Long Branch)	Democratic	Mar 4, 1887 – Mar 3, 1893	Elected in 1886. Retired.	18	52nd	18	Re-elected in 1889.	Mar 4, 1877– Mar 3, 1895	Democratic	John R. McPherson (Jersey City)	17
25	James Smith Jr. (Newark)	Democratic	Mar 4, 1893 – Mar 3, 1899	Elected in 1893. Lost re-election.	19	53rd	18	Re-elected in 1889.	Mar 4, 1877– Mar 3, 1895	Democratic	John R. McPherson (Jersey City)	17
25	James Smith Jr. (Newark)	Democratic	Mar 4, 1893 – Mar 3, 1899	Elected in 1893. Lost re-election.	19	54th	19	Elected in 1895.	Mar 4, 1895– Dec 27, 1901	Republican	William J. Sewell (Camden)	18
25	James Smith Jr. (Newark)	Democratic	Mar 4, 1893 – Mar 3, 1899	Elected in 1893. Lost re-election.	19	55th	19	Elected in 1895.	Mar 4, 1895– Dec 27, 1901	Republican	William J. Sewell (Camden)	18
26	John Kean (Elizabeth)	Republican	Mar 4, 1899 – Mar 3, 1911	Elected in 1899.	20	56th	19	Elected in 1895.	Mar 4, 1895– Dec 27, 1901	Republican	William J. Sewell (Camden)	18
26	John Kean (Elizabeth)	Republican	Mar 4, 1899 – Mar 3, 1911	Elected in 1899.	20	57th	20	Re-elected in 1901. Died.	Mar 4, 1895– Dec 27, 1901	Republican	William J. Sewell (Camden)	18
26	John Kean (Elizabeth)	Republican	Mar 4, 1899 – Mar 3, 1911	Elected in 1899.	20	57th	20		Dec 27, 1901– Jan 29, 1902	Vacant		
26	John Kean (Elizabeth)	Republican	Mar 4, 1899 – Mar 3, 1911	Elected in 1899.	20	57th	20	Elected to finish Sewell's term. Withdrew from election contest to full term.	Jan 29, 1902– Mar 3, 1907	Republican	John F. Dryden (Newark)	19
26	John Kean (Elizabeth)	Republican	Mar 4, 1899 – Mar 3, 1911	Elected in 1899.	20	58th	20	Elected to finish Sewell's term. Withdrew from election contest to full term.	Jan 29, 1902– Mar 3, 1907	Republican	John F. Dryden (Newark)	19
26	John Kean (Elizabeth)	Republican	Mar 4, 1899 – Mar 3, 1911	Re-elected in 1905. Retired.	21	59th	20	Elected to finish Sewell's term. Withdrew from election contest to full term.	Jan 29, 1902– Mar 3, 1907	Republican	John F. Dryden (Newark)	19
26	John Kean (Elizabeth)	Republican	Mar 4, 1899 – Mar 3, 1911	Re-elected in 1905. Retired.	21	60th	21	Elected in 1907. Lost re-election.	Mar 4, 1907 – Mar 3, 1913	Republican	Frank O. Briggs (Trenton)	20
26	John Kean (Elizabeth)	Republican	Mar 4, 1899 – Mar 3, 1911	Re-elected in 1905. Retired.	21	61st	21	Elected in 1907. Lost re-election.	Mar 4, 1907 – Mar 3, 1913	Republican	Frank O. Briggs (Trenton)	20
27	James E. Martine (Plainfield)	Democratic	Mar 4, 1911 – Mar 3, 1917	Elected in 1911. Lost re-election.	22	62nd	21	Elected in 1907. Lost re-election.	Mar 4, 1907 – Mar 3, 1913	Republican	Frank O. Briggs (Trenton)	20
27	James E. Martine (Plainfield)	Democratic	Mar 4, 1911 – Mar 3, 1917	Elected in 1911. Lost re-election.	22	63rd	22	Elected in 1913. Died.	Mar 4, 1913 – Jan 30, 1918	Democratic	William Hughes (Paterson)	21
27	James E. Martine (Plainfield)	Democratic	Mar 4, 1911 – Mar 3, 1917	Elected in 1911. Lost re-election.	22	64th	22	Elected in 1913. Died.	Mar 4, 1913 – Jan 30, 1918	Democratic	William Hughes (Paterson)	21
28	Joseph S. Frelinghuysen Sr. (Raritan)	Republican	Mar 4, 1917 – Mar 3, 1923	Elected in 1916. Lost re-election.	23	65th	22	Elected in 1913. Died.	Mar 4, 1913 – Jan 30, 1918	Democratic	William Hughes (Paterson)	21
28	Joseph S. Frelinghuysen Sr. (Raritan)	Republican	Mar 4, 1917 – Mar 3, 1923	Elected in 1916. Lost re-election.	23	65th	22		Jan 30, 1918 – Feb 23, 1918	Vacant		
28	Joseph S. Frelinghuysen Sr. (Raritan)	Republican	Mar 4, 1917 – Mar 3, 1923	Elected in 1916. Lost re-election.	23	65th	22	Appointed to continue Hughes's term. Elected in 1918 to finish Hughes's term. Retired.	Feb 23, 1918 – Mar 3, 1919	Republican	David Baird Sr. (Camden)	22
28	Joseph S. Frelinghuysen Sr. (Raritan)	Republican	Mar 4, 1917 – Mar 3, 1923	Elected in 1916. Lost re-election.	23	66th	23	Elected in 1918.	Mar 4, 1919 – Nov 21, 1929	Republican	Walter E. Edge (Atlantic City)	23
28	Joseph S. Frelinghuysen Sr. (Raritan)	Republican	Mar 4, 1917 – Mar 3, 1923	Elected in 1916. Lost re-election.	23	67th	23	Elected in 1918.	Mar 4, 1919 – Nov 21, 1929	Republican	Walter E. Edge (Atlantic City)	23
29	Edward I. Edwards (Jersey City)	Democratic	Mar 4, 1923 – Mar 3, 1929	Elected in 1922. Lost re-election.	24	68th	23	Elected in 1918.	Mar 4, 1919 – Nov 21, 1929	Republican	Walter E. Edge (Atlantic City)	23
29	Edward I. Edwards (Jersey City)	Democratic	Mar 4, 1923 – Mar 3, 1929	Elected in 1922. Lost re-election.	24	69th	24	Re-elected in 1924. Resigned to become U.S. Ambassador to France.	Mar 4, 1919 – Nov 21, 1929	Republican	Walter E. Edge (Atlantic City)	23
29	Edward I. Edwards (Jersey City)	Democratic	Mar 4, 1923 – Mar 3, 1929	Elected in 1922. Lost re-election.	24	70th	24	Re-elected in 1924. Resigned to become U.S. Ambassador to France.	Mar 4, 1919 – Nov 21, 1929	Republican	Walter E. Edge (Atlantic City)	23
30	Hamilton F. Kean (Elizabeth)	Republican	Mar 4, 1929 – Jan 3, 1935	Elected in 1928. Lost re-election.	25	71st	24	Re-elected in 1924. Resigned to become U.S. Ambassador to France.	Mar 4, 1919 – Nov 21, 1929	Republican	Walter E. Edge (Atlantic City)	23
30	Hamilton F. Kean (Elizabeth)	Republican	Mar 4, 1929 – Jan 3, 1935	Elected in 1928. Lost re-election.	25	71st	24		Nov 21, 1929 – Nov 30, 1929	Vacant		
30	Hamilton F. Kean (Elizabeth)	Republican	Mar 4, 1929 – Jan 3, 1935	Elected in 1928. Lost re-election.	25	71st	24	Appointed to continue Edge's term. Retired when his successor was qualified.	Nov 30, 1929 – Dec 2, 1930	Republican	David Baird Jr. (Camden)	24
30	Hamilton F. Kean (Elizabeth)	Republican	Mar 4, 1929 – Jan 3, 1935	Elected in 1928. Lost re-election.	25	71st	24	Elected in 1930 to finish Edge's term.	Dec 3, 1930 – Oct 5, 1931	Republican	Dwight Morrow (Englewood)	25
30	Hamilton F. Kean (Elizabeth)	Republican	Mar 4, 1929 – Jan 3, 1935	Elected in 1928. Lost re-election.	25	72nd	25	Elected to full term in 1930. Died.	Dec 3, 1930 – Oct 5, 1931	Republican	Dwight Morrow (Englewood)	25
30	Hamilton F. Kean (Elizabeth)	Republican	Mar 4, 1929 – Jan 3, 1935	Elected in 1928. Lost re-election.	25	72nd	25		Oct 5, 1931 – Dec 1, 1931	Vacant		
30	Hamilton F. Kean (Elizabeth)	Republican	Mar 4, 1929 – Jan 3, 1935	Elected in 1928. Lost re-election.	25	72nd	25	Appointed to continue Morrow's term. Elected in 1932 to finish Morrow's term. Lost re-election.	Dec 1, 1931 – Jan 3, 1937	Republican	W. Warren Barbour (Locust)	26
30	Hamilton F. Kean (Elizabeth)	Republican	Mar 4, 1929 – Jan 3, 1935	Elected in 1928. Lost re-election.	25	73rd	25	Appointed to continue Morrow's term. Elected in 1932 to finish Morrow's term. Lost re-election.	Dec 1, 1931 – Jan 3, 1937	Republican	W. Warren Barbour (Locust)	26
31	A. Harry Moore (Jersey City)	Democratic	Jan 3, 1935 – Jan 17, 1938	Elected in 1934. Resigned to become governor.	26	74th	25	Appointed to continue Morrow's term. Elected in 1932 to finish Morrow's term. Lost re-election.	Dec 1, 1931 – Jan 3, 1937	Republican	W. Warren Barbour (Locust)	26
31	A. Harry Moore (Jersey City)	Democratic	Jan 3, 1935 – Jan 17, 1938	Elected in 1934. Resigned to become governor.	26	75th	26	Elected in 1936. Lost re-election.	Jan 3, 1937 – Jan 3, 1943	Democratic	William H. Smathers (Atlantic City)	27
32	John Milton (Jersey City)	Democratic	Jan 18, 1938 – Nov 8, 1938	Appointed to continue Moore's term. Retired when successor qualified.	26	75th	26	Elected in 1936. Lost re-election.	Jan 3, 1937 – Jan 3, 1943	Democratic	William H. Smathers (Atlantic City)	27
33	W. Warren Barbour (Locust)	Republican	Nov 8, 1938 – Nov 22, 1943	Elected to finish Moore's term	26	75th	26	Elected in 1936. Lost re-election.	Jan 3, 1937 – Jan 3, 1943	Democratic	William H. Smathers (Atlantic City)	27
33	W. Warren Barbour (Locust)	Republican	Nov 8, 1938 – Nov 22, 1943	Elected to finish Moore's term	26	76th	26	Elected in 1936. Lost re-election.	Jan 3, 1937 – Jan 3, 1943	Democratic	William H. Smathers (Atlantic City)	27
33	W. Warren Barbour (Locust)	Republican	Nov 8, 1938 – Nov 22, 1943	Re-elected in 1940. Died.	27	77th	26	Elected in 1936. Lost re-election.	Jan 3, 1937 – Jan 3, 1943	Democratic	William H. Smathers (Atlantic City)	27
33	W. Warren Barbour (Locust)	Republican	Nov 8, 1938 – Nov 22, 1943	Re-elected in 1940. Died.	27	78th	27	Elected in 1942. Retired.	Jan 3, 1943 – Jan 3, 1949	Republican	Albert W. Hawkes (Montclair)	28
Vacant			Nov 22, 1943 – Nov 26, 1943		27	78th	27	Elected in 1942. Retired.	Jan 3, 1943 – Jan 3, 1949	Republican	Albert W. Hawkes (Montclair)	28
34	Arthur Walsh (South Orange)	Democratic	Nov 26, 1943 – Dec 7, 1944	Appointed to finish Barbour's term Retired when successor was elected	27	78th	27	Elected in 1942. Retired.	Jan 3, 1943 – Jan 3, 1949	Republican	Albert W. Hawkes (Montclair)	28
35	H. Alexander Smith (Princeton)	Republican	Dec 7, 1944– Jan 3, 1959	Elected to finish Barbour's term.	27	78th	27	Elected in 1942. Retired.	Jan 3, 1943 – Jan 3, 1949	Republican	Albert W. Hawkes (Montclair)	28
35	H. Alexander Smith (Princeton)	Republican	Dec 7, 1944– Jan 3, 1959	Elected to finish Barbour's term.	27	79th	27	Elected in 1942. Retired.	Jan 3, 1943 – Jan 3, 1949	Republican	Albert W. Hawkes (Montclair)	28
35	H. Alexander Smith (Princeton)	Republican	Dec 7, 1944– Jan 3, 1959	Re-elected in 1946.	28	80th	27	Elected in 1942. Retired.	Jan 3, 1943 – Jan 3, 1949	Republican	Albert W. Hawkes (Montclair)	28
35	H. Alexander Smith (Princeton)	Republican	Dec 7, 1944– Jan 3, 1959	Re-elected in 1946.	28	81st	28	Elected in 1948. Retired.	Jan 3, 1949 – Jan 3, 1955	Republican	Robert C. Hendrickson (Woodbury)	29
35	H. Alexander Smith (Princeton)	Republican	Dec 7, 1944– Jan 3, 1959	Re-elected in 1946.	28	82nd	28	Elected in 1948. Retired.	Jan 3, 1949 – Jan 3, 1955	Republican	Robert C. Hendrickson (Woodbury)	29
35	H. Alexander Smith (Princeton)	Republican	Dec 7, 1944– Jan 3, 1959	Re-elected in 1952. Retired.	29	83rd	28	Elected in 1948. Retired.	Jan 3, 1949 – Jan 3, 1955	Republican	Robert C. Hendrickson (Woodbury)	29
35	H. Alexander Smith (Princeton)	Republican	Dec 7, 1944– Jan 3, 1959	Re-elected in 1952. Retired.	29	84th	29	Elected in 1954.	Jan 3, 1955 – Jan 3, 1979	Republican	Clifford P. Case (Rahway)	30
35	H. Alexander Smith (Princeton)	Republican	Dec 7, 1944– Jan 3, 1959	Re-elected in 1952. Retired.	29	85th	29	Elected in 1954.	Jan 3, 1955 – Jan 3, 1979	Republican	Clifford P. Case (Rahway)	30
36	Harrison A. Williams (Bedminster)	Democratic	Jan 3, 1959 – Mar 11, 1982	Elected in 1958.	30	86th	29	Elected in 1954.	Jan 3, 1955 – Jan 3, 1979	Republican	Clifford P. Case (Rahway)	30
36	Harrison A. Williams (Bedminster)	Democratic	Jan 3, 1959 – Mar 11, 1982	Elected in 1958.	30	87th	30	Re-elected in 1960.	Jan 3, 1955 – Jan 3, 1979	Republican	Clifford P. Case (Rahway)	30
36	Harrison A. Williams (Bedminster)	Democratic	Jan 3, 1959 – Mar 11, 1982	Elected in 1958.	30	88th	30	Re-elected in 1960.	Jan 3, 1955 – Jan 3, 1979	Republican	Clifford P. Case (Rahway)	30
36	Harrison A. Williams (Bedminster)	Democratic	Jan 3, 1959 – Mar 11, 1982	Re-elected in 1964.	31	89th	30	Re-elected in 1960.	Jan 3, 1955 – Jan 3, 1979	Republican	Clifford P. Case (Rahway)	30
36	Harrison A. Williams (Bedminster)	Democratic	Jan 3, 1959 – Mar 11, 1982	Re-elected in 1964.	31	90th	31	Re-elected in 1966.	Jan 3, 1955 – Jan 3, 1979	Republican	Clifford P. Case (Rahway)	30
36	Harrison A. Williams (Bedminster)	Democratic	Jan 3, 1959 – Mar 11, 1982	Re-elected in 1964.	31	91st	31	Re-elected in 1966.	Jan 3, 1955 – Jan 3, 1979	Republican	Clifford P. Case (Rahway)	30
36	Harrison A. Williams (Bedminster)	Democratic	Jan 3, 1959 – Mar 11, 1982	Re-elected in 1970.	32	92nd	31	Re-elected in 1966.	Jan 3, 1955 – Jan 3, 1979	Republican	Clifford P. Case (Rahway)	30
36	Harrison A. Williams (Bedminster)	Democratic	Jan 3, 1959 – Mar 11, 1982	Re-elected in 1970.	32	93rd	32	Re-elected in 1972. Lost renomination.	Jan 3, 1955 – Jan 3, 1979	Republican	Clifford P. Case (Rahway)	30
36	Harrison A. Williams (Bedminster)	Democratic	Jan 3, 1959 – Mar 11, 1982	Re-elected in 1970.	32	94th	32	Re-elected in 1972. Lost renomination.	Jan 3, 1955 – Jan 3, 1979	Republican	Clifford P. Case (Rahway)	30
36	Harrison A. Williams (Bedminster)	Democratic	Jan 3, 1959 – Mar 11, 1982	Re-elected in 1976. Resigned.	33	95th	32	Re-elected in 1972. Lost renomination.	Jan 3, 1955 – Jan 3, 1979	Republican	Clifford P. Case (Rahway)	30
36	Harrison A. Williams (Bedminster)	Democratic	Jan 3, 1959 – Mar 11, 1982	Re-elected in 1976. Resigned.	33	96th	33	Elected in 1978.	Jan 3, 1979 – Jan 3, 1997	Democratic	Bill Bradley (Montclair)	31
36	Harrison A. Williams (Bedminster)	Democratic	Jan 3, 1959 – Mar 11, 1982	Re-elected in 1976. Resigned.	33	97th	33	Elected in 1978.	Jan 3, 1979 – Jan 3, 1997	Democratic	Bill Bradley (Montclair)	31
Vacant			Mar 11, 1982 – Apr 12, 1982		33	97th	33	Elected in 1978.	Jan 3, 1979 – Jan 3, 1997	Democratic	Bill Bradley (Montclair)	31
37	Nicholas F. Brady (Far Hills)	Republican	Apr 12, 1982 – Dec 27, 1982	Appointed to finish Williams's term. Retired and resigned early to give his elected successor preferential seniority.	33	97th	33	Elected in 1978.	Jan 3, 1979 – Jan 3, 1997	Democratic	Bill Bradley (Montclair)	31
38	Frank Lautenberg (Cliffside Park)	Democratic	Dec 27, 1982 – Jan 3, 2001	Appointed early to finish Williams's term, having been already elected to the next term.	33	97th	33	Elected in 1978.	Jan 3, 1979 – Jan 3, 1997	Democratic	Bill Bradley (Montclair)	31
38	Frank Lautenberg (Cliffside Park)	Democratic	Dec 27, 1982 – Jan 3, 2001	Elected in 1982.	34	98th	33	Elected in 1978.	Jan 3, 1979 – Jan 3, 1997	Democratic	Bill Bradley (Montclair)	31
38	Frank Lautenberg (Cliffside Park)	Democratic	Dec 27, 1982 – Jan 3, 2001	Elected in 1982.	34	99th	34	Re-elected in 1984.	Jan 3, 1979 – Jan 3, 1997	Democratic	Bill Bradley (Montclair)	31
38	Frank Lautenberg (Cliffside Park)	Democratic	Dec 27, 1982 – Jan 3, 2001	Elected in 1982.	34	100th	34	Re-elected in 1984.	Jan 3, 1979 – Jan 3, 1997	Democratic	Bill Bradley (Montclair)	31
38	Frank Lautenberg (Cliffside Park)	Democratic	Dec 27, 1982 – Jan 3, 2001	Re-elected in 1988.	35	101st	34	Re-elected in 1984.	Jan 3, 1979 – Jan 3, 1997	Democratic	Bill Bradley (Montclair)	31
38	Frank Lautenberg (Cliffside Park)	Democratic	Dec 27, 1982 – Jan 3, 2001	Re-elected in 1988.	35	102nd	35	Re-elected in 1990. Retired.	Jan 3, 1979 – Jan 3, 1997	Democratic	Bill Bradley (Montclair)	31
38	Frank Lautenberg (Cliffside Park)	Democratic	Dec 27, 1982 – Jan 3, 2001	Re-elected in 1988.	35	103rd	35	Re-elected in 1990. Retired.	Jan 3, 1979 – Jan 3, 1997	Democratic	Bill Bradley (Montclair)	31
38	Frank Lautenberg (Cliffside Park)	Democratic	Dec 27, 1982 – Jan 3, 2001	Re-elected in 1994. Retired.	36	104th	35	Re-elected in 1990. Retired.	Jan 3, 1979 – Jan 3, 1997	Democratic	Bill Bradley (Montclair)	31
38	Frank Lautenberg (Cliffside Park)	Democratic	Dec 27, 1982 – Jan 3, 2001	Re-elected in 1994. Retired.	36	105th	36	Elected in 1996. Ran for re-election, but withdrew.	Jan 3, 1997 – Jan 3, 2003	Democratic	Robert Torricelli (Englewood)	32
38	Frank Lautenberg (Cliffside Park)	Democratic	Dec 27, 1982 – Jan 3, 2001	Re-elected in 1994. Retired.	36	106th	36	Elected in 1996. Ran for re-election, but withdrew.	Jan 3, 1997 – Jan 3, 2003	Democratic	Robert Torricelli (Englewood)	32
39	Jon Corzine (Hoboken)	Democratic	Jan 3, 2001 – Jan 17, 2006	Elected in 2000. Resigned to become Governor of New Jersey.	37	107th	36	Elected in 1996. Ran for re-election, but withdrew.	Jan 3, 1997 – Jan 3, 2003	Democratic	Robert Torricelli (Englewood)	32
39	Jon Corzine (Hoboken)	Democratic	Jan 3, 2001 – Jan 17, 2006	Elected in 2000. Resigned to become Governor of New Jersey.	37	108th	37	Elected in 2002.	Jan 3, 2003 – Jun 3, 2013	Democratic	Frank Lautenberg (Cliffside Park)	33
39	Jon Corzine (Hoboken)	Democratic	Jan 3, 2001 – Jan 17, 2006	Elected in 2000. Resigned to become Governor of New Jersey.	37	109th	37	Elected in 2002.	Jan 3, 2003 – Jun 3, 2013	Democratic	Frank Lautenberg (Cliffside Park)	33
40	Bob Menendez (Hoboken)	Democratic	Jan 17, 2006 – Aug 20, 2024	Appointed to finish Corzine's term.	37	109th	37	Elected in 2002.	Jan 3, 2003 – Jun 3, 2013	Democratic	Frank Lautenberg (Cliffside Park)	33
40	Bob Menendez (Hoboken)	Democratic	Jan 17, 2006 – Aug 20, 2024	Elected to full term in 2006.	38	110th	37	Elected in 2002.	Jan 3, 2003 – Jun 3, 2013	Democratic	Frank Lautenberg (Cliffside Park)	33
40	Bob Menendez (Hoboken)	Democratic	Jan 17, 2006 – Aug 20, 2024	Elected to full term in 2006.	38	111th	38	Re-elected in 2008. Died.	Jan 3, 2003 – Jun 3, 2013	Democratic	Frank Lautenberg (Cliffside Park)	33
40	Bob Menendez (Hoboken)	Democratic	Jan 17, 2006 – Aug 20, 2024	Elected to full term in 2006.	38	112th	38	Re-elected in 2008. Died.	Jan 3, 2003 – Jun 3, 2013	Democratic	Frank Lautenberg (Cliffside Park)	33
40	Bob Menendez (Hoboken)	Democratic	Jan 17, 2006 – Aug 20, 2024	Re-elected in 2012.	39	113th	38	Re-elected in 2008. Died.	Jan 3, 2003 – Jun 3, 2013	Democratic	Frank Lautenberg (Cliffside Park)	33
40	Bob Menendez (Hoboken)	Democratic	Jan 17, 2006 – Aug 20, 2024	Re-elected in 2012.	39	113th	38		Jun 3, 2013 – Jun 6, 2013	Vacant		
40	Bob Menendez (Hoboken)	Democratic	Jan 17, 2006 – Aug 20, 2024	Re-elected in 2012.	39	113th	38	Appointed to continue Lautenberg's term. Retired when his successor was elected.	Jun 6, 2013 – Oct 30, 2013	Republican	Jeffrey Chiesa (Branchburg)	34
40	Bob Menendez (Hoboken)	Democratic	Jan 17, 2006 – Aug 20, 2024	Re-elected in 2012.	39	113th	38	Elected in 2013 to finish Lautenberg's term.	Oct 31, 2013 – present	Democratic	Cory Booker (Newark)	35
40	Bob Menendez (Hoboken)	Democratic	Jan 17, 2006 – Aug 20, 2024	Re-elected in 2012.	39	114th	39	Re-elected in 2014.	Oct 31, 2013 – present	Democratic	Cory Booker (Newark)	35
40	Bob Menendez (Hoboken)	Democratic	Jan 17, 2006 – Aug 20, 2024	Re-elected in 2012.	39	115th	39	Re-elected in 2014.	Oct 31, 2013 – present	Democratic	Cory Booker (Newark)	35
40	Bob Menendez (Hoboken)	Democratic	Jan 17, 2006 – Aug 20, 2024	Re-elected in 2018. Resigned due to bribery convictions.	40	116th	39	Re-elected in 2014.	Oct 31, 2013 – present	Democratic	Cory Booker (Newark)	35
40	Bob Menendez (Hoboken)	Democratic	Jan 17, 2006 – Aug 20, 2024	Re-elected in 2018. Resigned due to bribery convictions.	40	117th	40	Re-elected in 2020.	Oct 31, 2013 – present	Democratic	Cory Booker (Newark)	35
40	Bob Menendez (Hoboken)	Democratic	Jan 17, 2006 – Aug 20, 2024	Re-elected in 2018. Resigned due to bribery convictions.	40	118th	40	Re-elected in 2020.	Oct 31, 2013 – present	Democratic	Cory Booker (Newark)	35
Vacant			Aug 20, 2024 – Aug 23, 2024		40	118th	40	Re-elected in 2020.	Oct 31, 2013 – present	Democratic	Cory Booker (Newark)	35
41	George Helmy (Mountain Lakes)	Democratic	Aug 23, 2024 – Dec 8, 2024	Appointed to finish Menendez's term. Was not a candidate for the next term. Resigned early to give his elected successor preferential seniority.	40	118th	40	Re-elected in 2020.	Oct 31, 2013 – present	Democratic	Cory Booker (Newark)	35
42	Andy Kim (Moorestown)	Democratic	Dec 8, 2024 – present	Appointed early to finish Menendez's term, having been already elected to the next term.	40	118th	40	Re-elected in 2020.	Oct 31, 2013 – present	Democratic	Cory Booker (Newark)	35
42	Andy Kim (Moorestown)	Democratic	Dec 8, 2024 – present	Elected in 2024.	41	119th	40	Re-elected in 2020.	Oct 31, 2013 – present	Democratic	Cory Booker (Newark)	35
42	Andy Kim (Moorestown)	Democratic	Dec 8, 2024 – present	Elected in 2024.	41	120th	41	Re-elected in 2026.	Oct 31, 2013 – present	Democratic	Cory Booker (Newark)	35
42	Andy Kim (Moorestown)	Democratic	Dec 8, 2024 – present	Elected in 2024.	41	121st	41	Re-elected in 2026.	Oct 31, 2013 – present	Democratic	Cory Booker (Newark)	35
To be determined in the 2030 election.					42	122nd	41	Re-elected in 2026.	Oct 31, 2013 – present	Democratic	Cory Booker (Newark)	35
To be determined in the 2030 election.					42	123rd	42	To be determined in the 2032 election.				

== See also ==
- Elections in New Jersey
- List of United States representatives from New Jersey
- New Jersey's congressional delegations
