= 1911 United States Senate election in New Jersey =

- January 24–25, 1911

Resolution of the New Jersey Legislature
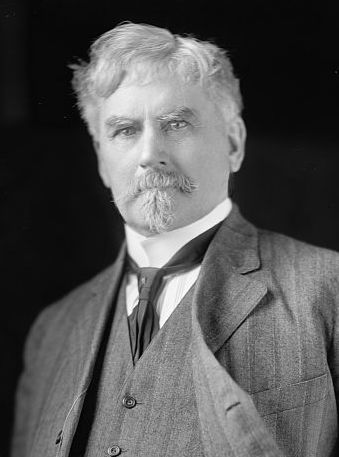

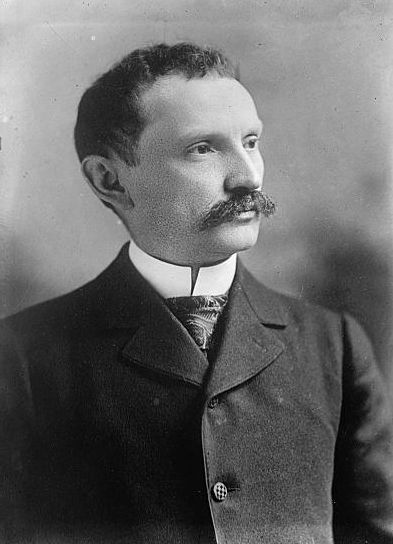

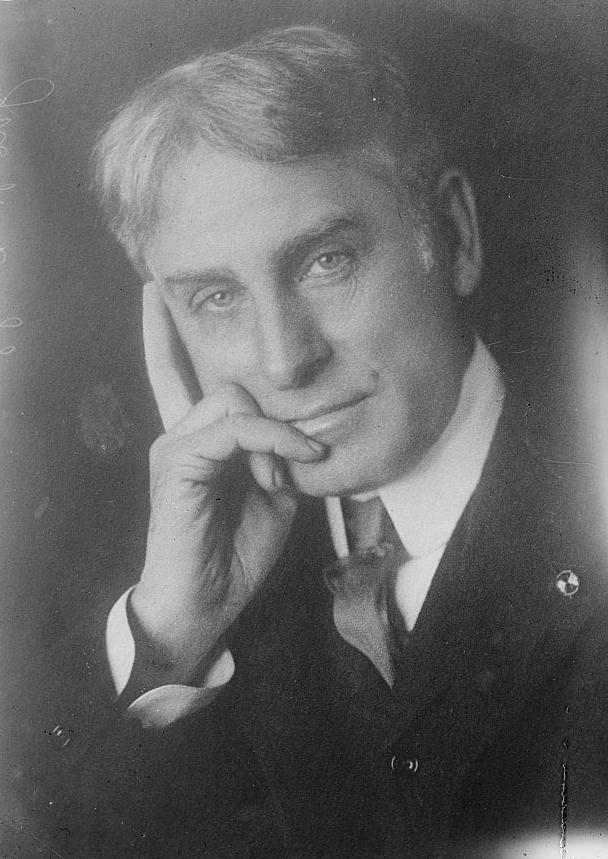
Nominee	James E. Martine	Edward C. Stokes	John W. Griggs
Party	Democratic	Republican	Republican
Electoral vote	47	21	5
Percentage	59.5%	26.6%	6.3%
Senator before election
John Kean
Republican
Elected Senator
James Edgar Martine
Democratic

The 1911 United States Senate election in New Jersey was held on January 24–25, 1911. Republican incumbent John Kean did not run for re-election to a third term. The open seat was won by Democrat James Edgar Martine with Republican former Governor Edward C. Stokes as the runner-up.

Prior to passage of the Seventeenth Amendment to the United States Constitution, New Jersey elected United States senators by a resolution of the New Jersey Legislature.

On September 13, 1910, direct "advisory" primaries were held. Martine defeated John McDermitt of Newark for the Democratic nomination, while Stokes narrowly won a three-way Republican primary against former Governor Franklin Murphy and U.S. Representative Charles N. Fowler. Thus, Martine or Stokes stood likely to be elected Senator if their respective party won the 1910 fall legislative elections.

== Republican primary ==
=== Candidates ===
- Charles N. Fowler, U.S. Representative from Elizabeth since 1895
- Franklin Murphy, chairman of the New Jersey Republican Party and former Governor (1902–1905)
- Edward C. Stokes, former Governor (1905–1908) and State Senator from Cumberland County (1893–1903)

==== Declined ====
- John Kean, incumbent Senator since 1899

=== Results ===
1910 Republican U.S. Senate primary
Party	Candidate	Votes	%
Republican	Edward C. Stokes	39,781	34.63%
Republican	Charles N. Fowler	38,853	33.82%
Republican	Franklin Murphy	36,252	31.55%
Total votes		114,886	100.00%

== Democratic primary ==
=== Candidates ===
- James E. Martine, candidate for mayor of Plainfield and U.S. Representative
- Frank M. McDermit, Newark attorney

=== Results ===
Martine carried every county, though no Democratic vote was reported in Ocean County or Cape May.

1910 Democratic U.S. Senate primary
Party	Candidate	Votes	%
Democratic	James E. Martine	48,458	75.68%
Democratic	Frank M. McDermit	15,575	24.32%
Total votes		64,033	100.00%

=== Aftermath ===
Despite Martine's victory, the primary was non-binding. Former Senator James Smith Jr., who broke his alliance with Martine and Woodrow Wilson, pledged to challenge him in the January legislative election.

== Results ==
The Senate was unable to reach a choice on January 24, so both houses met in joint session on January 25 to elect Martine.

=== Senate ===
1911 U.S. Senate election in the New Jersey Senate
Party	Candidate	Votes	%
Democratic	James E. Martine	9	45.00%
Republican	Edward C. Stokes	9	45.00%
Republican	J. Franklin Fort	1	5.00%
Republican	John Kean	1	5.00%
Total votes		20	100.00%

=== Assembly ===
1911 U.S. Senate election in the New Jersey Assembly
Party	Candidate	Votes	%
Democratic	James E. Martine	31	51.67%
Republican	Edward C. Stokes	13	21.67%
Democratic	James Smith Jr.	10	16.67%
Republican	John W. Griggs	5	8.33%
Democratic	James A. Hamill	1	1.67%
Total votes		60	100.00%

=== Joint session ===
1911 U.S. Senate election in the New Jersey Legislature
Party	Candidate	Votes	%
Democratic	James E. Martine	47	59.49%
Republican	Edward C. Stokes	21	26.58%
Republican	John W. Griggs	5	6.33%
Democratic	James Smith Jr.	3	3.80%
Republican	J. Franklin Fort	1	1.27%
Republican	John Kean	1	1.27%
Republican	Mahlon Pitney	1	1.27%
Total votes		79	100.00%
