= 1913 United States Senate election in New Jersey =

- January 28, 1913

Resolution of the New Jersey Legislature
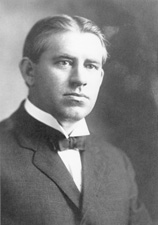

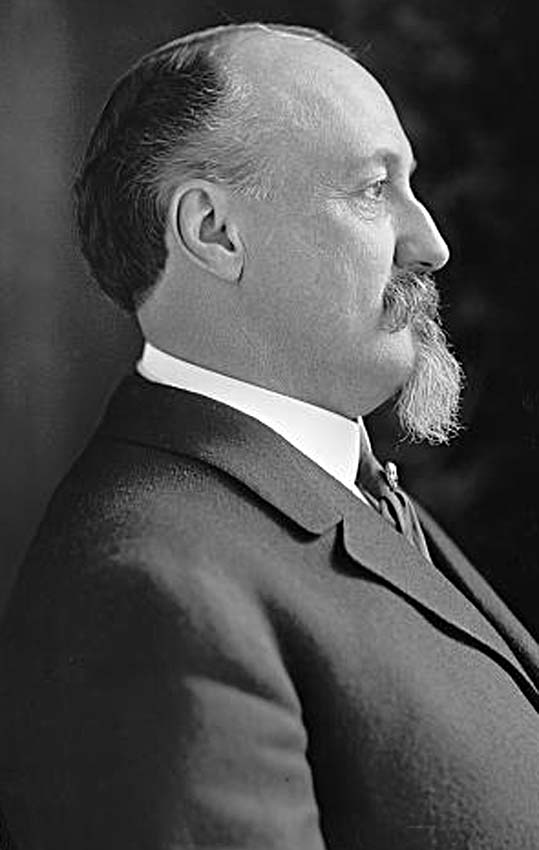
Nominee	William Hughes	Frank O. Briggs
Party	Democratic	Republican
Senate	12	9
Percentage	57.1%	42.9%
Assembly	51	8
Percentage	86.4%	13.6%
Senator before election
Frank O. Briggs
Republican
Elected Senator
William Hughes
Democratic

The 1913 United States Senate election in New Jersey was held on January 28, 1913. Republican incumbent Frank O. Briggs ran for re-election to a second term, but was defeated by Democratic judge and former U.S. representative William Hughes.

Prior to passage of the Seventeenth Amendment to the United States Constitution, New Jersey elected United States senators by a resolution of the New Jersey Legislature.

On September 24, 1912, direct "advisory" primaries were held. Hughes defeated former senator James Smith Jr. and John McDermitt of Newark for the Democratic nomination, while Briggs easily won the Republican nomination. Thus, Hughes or Briggs stood likely to be elected Senator if their respective party won the 1910 fall legislative elections.

== Republican primary ==
=== Candidates ===
- Frank O. Briggs, incumbent Senator since 1907
- Wescott

=== Results ===
Primary results by county

1912 Republican U.S. Senate primary
Party	Candidate	Votes	%
Republican	Frank O. Briggs (incumbent)	68,903	94.70%
Republican	Wescott	3,859	5.30%
Total votes		72,762	100.00%

== Democratic primary ==
=== Candidates ===
- William Hughes, U.S. representative from Paterson
- Frank M. McDermit, Newark resident and candidate for Senate in 1911
- James Smith Jr., former U.S. senator (1893–1899) and candidate for Senate in 1911

=== Results ===
Primary results by county

1912 Democratic U.S. Senate primary
Party	Candidate	Votes	%
Democratic	William Hughes	62,532	61.72%
Democratic	James Smith Jr.	33,490	33.06%
Democratic	John McDermitt	5,291	5.22%
Total votes		101,313	100.00%

Three days after winning the primary, Hughes resigned from the House and was appointed judge of Court of Common Pleas of Passaic County.

== Results ==
=== Senate ===
1913 U.S. Senate election in the New Jersey Senate
Party	Candidate	Votes	%
Democratic	William Hughes	12	57.14%
Republican	Frank O. Briggs (incumbent)	9	42.86%
Total votes		21	100.00%

=== Assembly ===
1913 U.S. Senate election in the New Jersey General Assembly
Party	Candidate	Votes	%
Democratic	William Hughes	51	86.44%
Republican	Frank O. Briggs (incumbent)	8	13.56%
Total votes		59	100.00%

Briggs, died just a few months later on May 8, 1913. Hughes would not serve the complete term, dying January 30, 1918, just before the next scheduled election.
