= Frank O. Briggs =

American politician

Frank Obadiah Briggs
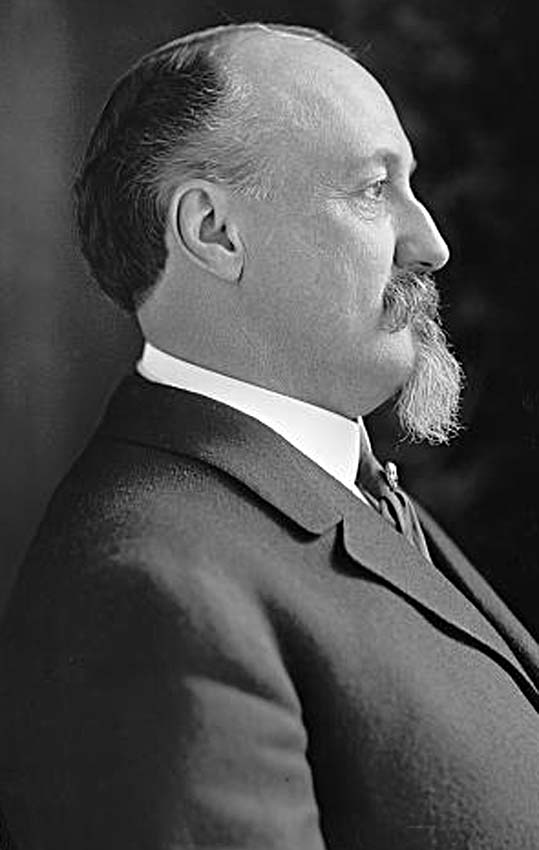

United States Senator from New Jersey
- In office March 4, 1907 – March 3, 1913
- Preceded by: John F. Dryden
- Succeeded by: William Hughes

New Jersey State Treasurer
- In office 1902–1907
- Governor: Franklin Murphy; Edward C. Stokes
- Preceded by: George B. Swain
- Succeeded by: Daniel Spader Voorhees

30th Mayor of Trenton, New Jersey
- In office 1899–1902
- Preceded by: Welling G. Sickel
- Succeeded by: Frank S. Katzenbach

Personal details
- Born: August 12, 1851 Concord, New Hampshire, US
- Died: May 8, 1913 (aged 61) Trenton, New Jersey, US
- Resting place: Riverview Cemetery, Trenton, New Jersey, US
- Party: Republican
- Parent: James Frankland Briggs

Frank Obadiah Briggs (August 12, 1851 – May 8, 1913) was the Mayor of Trenton, New Jersey, from 1899 to 1902. He was a United States senator from New Jersey from 1907 to 1913.

== Biography ==
Briggs was born on August 12, 1851, in Concord, New Hampshire, the son of James Frankland Briggs and Roxanna (Smith) Briggs.

He attended the public schools, Francestown Academy, and Phillips Exeter Academy. He graduated from the United States Military Academy in 1872 and served in the 2nd Infantry Regiment as a second lieutenant until 1877, when he resigned from the Army.

In 1877, he moved to Trenton, New Jersey, and engaged in the manufacture of wire and wire products; he was a member of the Trenton School Board from 1884 to 1892 and was Mayor of Trenton, New Jersey, from 1899 to 1902. In 1901 and 1902, he was a member of the New Jersey State Board of Education, and was New Jersey State Treasurer from 1902 to 1907.

Briggs was Chairman of the New Jersey Republican State Committee from 1904 to 1907 and again from 1910 until his death in 1913. He was elected as a Republican to the U.S. Senate, serving from March 4, 1907, to March 3, 1913; he was an unsuccessful candidate for reelection.

While in the Senate, he was chairman of the Committee on Geological Survey (Sixty-first Congress) and a member of the Committee to Audit and Control the Contingent Expense (Sixty-second Congress). He resumed his former business pursuits in Trenton, where he died in 1913, aged 61. He was buried in Riverview Cemetery.

U.S. Senate
Preceded by John F. Dryden	U.S. senator (Class 2) from New Jersey; 1907–1913; Served alongside: John Kean, James E. Martine	Succeeded by William Hughes
Party political offices
Preceded by Franklin Murphy	Chairman of the New Jersey Republican State Committee; 1904–1907	Succeeded by Franklin Murphy
Preceded by Franklin Murphy	Chairman of the New Jersey Republican State Committee; 1910–1913	Succeeded by Newton A.K. Bugbee
