= 1916 United States Senate election in New Jersey =

- November 7, 1916
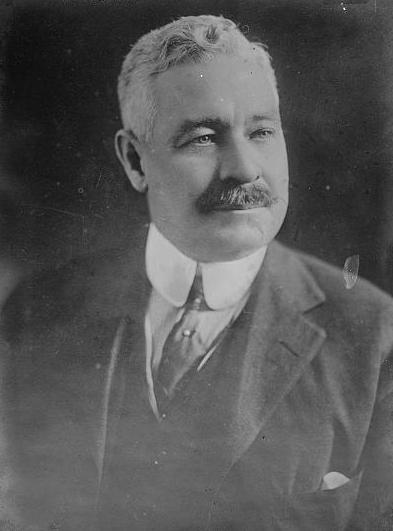

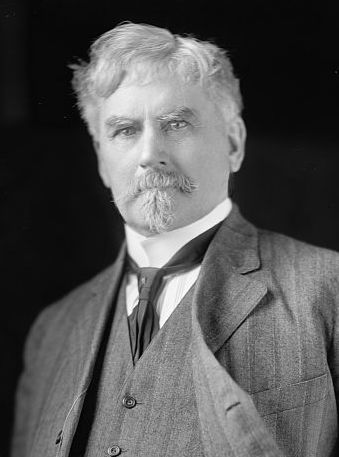
Nominee	Joseph S. Frelinghuysen Sr.	James E. Martine
Party	Republican	Democratic
Popular vote	244,715	170,019
Percentage	55.99%	38.90%
- County results Martine: 40–50% 50–60% Frelinghuysen: 50–60% 60–70%
Senator before election
James E. Martine
Democratic
Elected Senator
Joseph S. Frelinghuysen Sr.
Republican

The United States Senate election of 1916 in New Jersey was held on November 7, 1916. Incumbent Democratic senator James E. Martine ran for re-election to a second term in office but was defeated by Republican state senator Joseph Frelinghuysen in an election dominated by American preparedness for World War I.

Primary elections were held on September 26. Senator Martine defeated a challenge from John W. Wescott, the Attorney General of New Jersey and an ally of President Woodrow Wilson. The Republican nomination narrowly went to State Senator Joseph S. Frelinghuysen Sr. over former Governor Franklin Murphy.

This was the first popular election for United States Senator in New Jersey history, following the passage of the Seventeenth Amendment to the United States Constitution. This was also the first of four straight elections to this seat in which the incumbent was defeated.

== Democratic primary ==
=== Candidates ===
- August M. Bruggeman, Hoboken resident
- James E. Martine, incumbent Senator since 1911
- Frank M. McDermit, Newark attorney and perennial candidate
- John W. Wescott, attorney general of New Jersey

=== Campaign ===
Senator Martine drew a primary challenge from Woodrow Wilson ally John W. Wescott, the state attorney general. Wescott's strong alliance with President Wilson and Martine's opposition to administration policy on World War I and criticism of British war policy, including his expression of sympathy for executed Irish nationalist Roger Casement on the floor of the Senate, led some Democrats to think him vulnerable to a primary challenge. Martine was known for his independence and had previously said that he would rather retire to his Union County farm than go to the White House "for orders."

A third candidate from Newark, Frank McDermit, may have drawn away Martine supporters in Essex County. Wescott had the support of the Essex County machine.

=== Results ===
Martine defeated Wescott by a large margin in Hudson County and won the strong support of ethnic Germans, who approved of his critical stance on Wilson's war policy. Despite strong opposition from the Nugent machine in Essex and McDermit's candidacy, Martine carried the county narrowly with a plurality.

1916 Democratic U.S. Senate primary
Party	Candidate	Votes	%
Democratic	James E. Martine (incumbent)	50,961	48.76%
Democratic	John W. Wescott	29,627	28.35%
Democratic	Frank M. McDermit	17,373	16.62%
Democratic	August M. Bruggeman	6,559	6.28%
Total votes		104,520	100.00%
None	Blank votes	14,993	—
Turnout		119,513	100.00%

Given his close alliance with Wilson personally and politically, Wescott's loss was seen as a blow to the administration and Wilson's re-election hopes.

== Republican primary ==
=== Candidates ===
- Joseph S. Frelinghuysen, former state senator for Somerset County and president of the New Jersey Senate
- Franklin Murphy, former governor of New Jersey (1902–05)

=== Campaign ===
In the campaign, the statewide party machine backed Franklin Murphy against a challenge by Joseph Frelinghuysen, a business executive and former state senator. Frelinghuysen was aligned with Austen Colgate, an insurgent candidate in the parallel primary for governor against Walter Edge. Opponents accused Frelinghuysen of non-residency, given that his winter home and business were in New York. Frelinghuysen was also opposed by automobile owners, based on his record as senator. On primary day, most observers expected Murphy to win. Both candidates emphasized their opposition to President Wilson.

Frelinghuysen actively targeted German-American voters during the campaign by highlighting Republican critiques of Wilson's foreign policy without endorsing full intervention, as well as arguing that Wilson's tariff policy harmed New Jersey's industrial and agricultural sectors. Murphy focused his campaign in the state's urban centers and industrial sector.

=== Results ===
Frelinghuysen won a surprise victory over Murphy, who managed only a small plurality of under 5,000 in his home base of Essex County. Frelinghuysen overcame his poor showing in the cities by winning large margins in the suburban and rural regions of the state.

1916 Republican U.S. Senate primary
Party	Candidate	Votes	%
Republican	Joseph Frelinghuysen	89,361	52.31%
Republican	Franklin Murphy	81,483	47.69%
Total votes		170,844	100.00%
None	Blank votes	16,570	—
Turnout		187,414	100.00%

==== Results by county ====
1916 Republican U.S. Senate primary
County	Frelinghuysen		Murphy		Total
County	Votes	%	Votes	%	Total
Atlantic	3,808	43.6%	4,928	56.4%	8,736
Bergen	5,437	46.3%	6,307	53.7%	11,744
Burlington	4,826	66.3%	2,452	33.7%	7,278
Camden	6,427	41.0%	9,231	59.0%	15,658
Cape May	1,170	41.7%	1,633	58.3%	2,803
Cumberland	1,971	48.7%	2,077	51.3%	4,048
Essex	14,501	42.9%	19,267	57.1%	33,768
Gloucester	2,344	66.0%	1,207	34.0%	3,551
Hudson	8,466	56.7%	6,462	43.3%	14,928
Hunterdon	1,232	81.5%	279	18.5%	1,511
Mercer	5,757	57.2%	4,306	42.8%	10,063
Middlesex	3,097	61.5%	1,942	38.5%	5,039
Monmouth	3,483	55.4%	2,805	44.6%	6,288
Morris	3,817	53.9%	3,266	46.1%	7,083
Ocean	1,622	61.4%	1,020	38.6%	2,642
Passaic	9,416	53.7%	8,118	46.3%	17,534
Salem	1,016	70.9%	428	29.1%	1,434
Somerset	3,157	88.6%	407	11.4%	3,564
Sussex	534	41.2%	763	58.8%	1,297
Union	6,486	62.5%	3,884	37.5%	10,370
Warren	794	53.1%	701	46.9%	1,495

== General election ==
=== Candidates ===
- Livingston Barbour (Prohibition)
- William C. Doughty (Socialist)
- Joseph S. Frelinghuysen, former state senator from Somerset County and president of the New Jersey Senate (Republican)
- Rudolph Katz (Socialist Labor)
- James E. Martine, incumbent senator (Democratic)

=== Campaign ===
New Jersey was considered a battleground state in the 1916 presidential election, and the Senate race generally reflected national policy concerns. Martine emphasized Democratic policies such as tariff revision, antitrust enforcement, and federal support for labor and farming interests. Frelinghuysen endorsed the Republican platform, arguing for military preparedness, the establishment of a nonpartisan tariff commission to set rates, and development of a merchant marine force to protect American shipping. Both candidates supported federal aid to farmers. Frelinghuysen joined his party's presidential nominee, Charles Evans Hughes, in assailing the Democratic incumbents for failing to anticipate and address unrestricted submarine warfare by Germany in the aftermath of the sinking of the RMS Lusitania and the Sussex crisis. Frelinghuysen also coordinated with gubernatorial nominee Walter Edge.

The Socialist nominee, William Doughty, ran on a pacifist platform.

=== Results ===
Martine ran significantly behind the Democratic ticket, leading The New York Times to refer to him as "the worst-beaten man in the state."

1916 United States Senate election in New Jersey
Party	Candidate	Votes	%
Republican	Joseph S. Frelinghuysen Sr.	244,715	55.99%
Democratic	James E. Martine (incumbent)	170,019	38.90%
Socialist	William C. Doughty	13,358	3.06%
Prohibition	Livingston Barbour	7,178	0.11%
Socialist Labor	Rudolph Katz	1,826	0.42%
Total votes		437,096	100.00%

== See also ==
- 1916 New Jersey gubernatorial election
- 1916 United States presidential election in New Jersey
- 1916 United States Senate elections
