= William Hughes (senator) =

American politician (1872–1918)

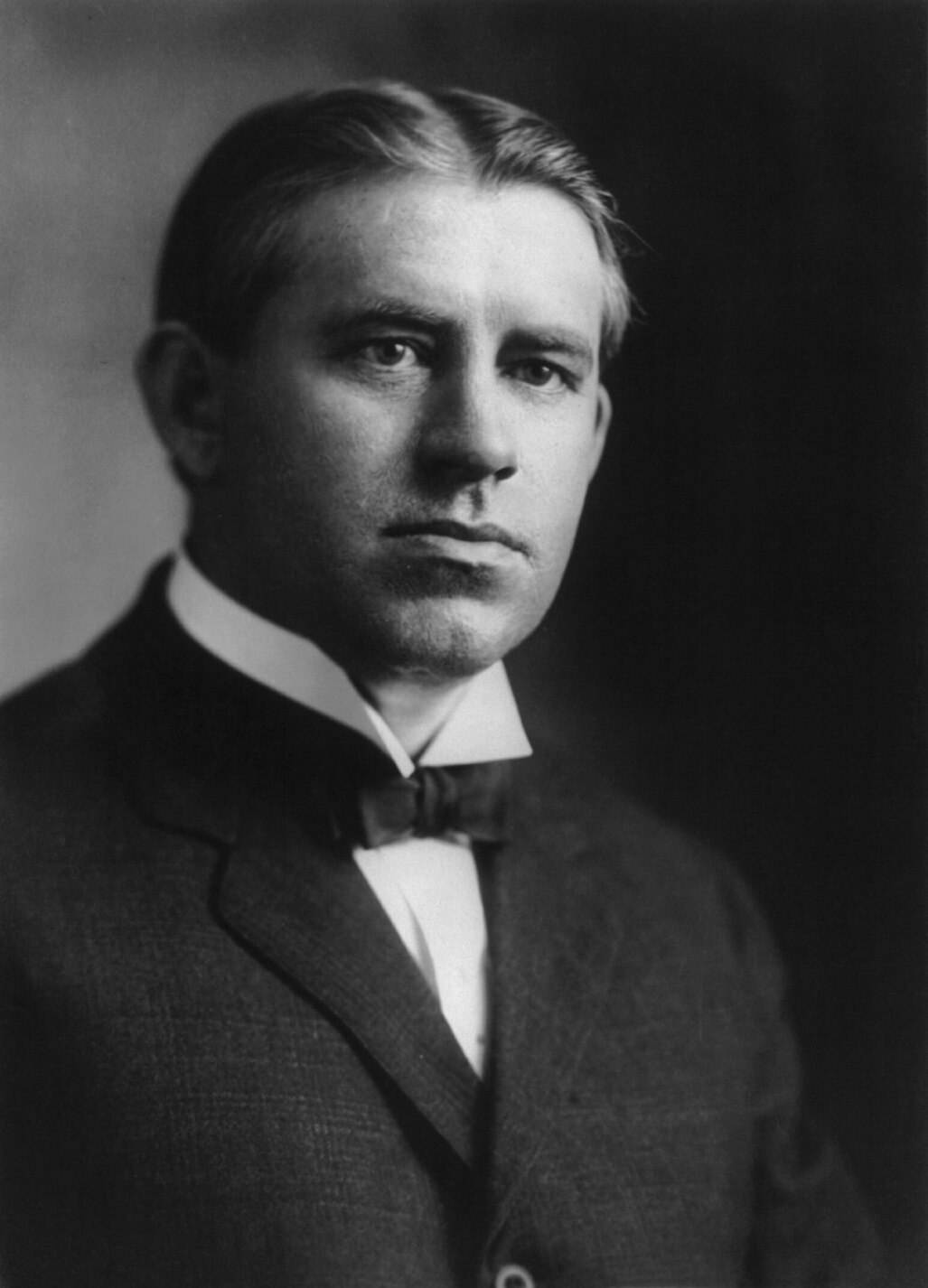
- Hughes in 1912

United States Senator from New Jersey
- In office March 4, 1913 – January 30, 1918
- Preceded by: Frank O. Briggs
- Succeeded by: David Baird

Member of the U.S. House of Representatives from New Jersey's 6th district
- In office March 4, 1903 – March 3, 1905
- Preceded by: Richard W. Parker
- Succeeded by: Henry C. Allen
- In office March 4, 1907 – September 27, 1912
- Preceded by: Henry C. Allen
- Succeeded by: Archibald C. Hart

Personal details
- Born: April 3, 1872 Drogheda, Ireland
- Died: January 30, 1918 (aged 45) Trenton, New Jersey, U.S.
- Resting place: Cedar Lawn Cemetery
- Party: Democratic

William Hughes (April 3, 1872 – January 30, 1918) was an American politician of Irish origin. A member of the Democratic Party, he served in both houses of the United States Congress as the U.S. representative for New Jersey's 6th congressional district from 1903 to 1905 and again from 1907 to 1912 and a United States senator from New Jersey from 1913 to 1918.

== Early life ==
William was born on April 3, 1872 in Drogheda, County Louth, Ireland. His family immigrated to the United States when he was eight years old, briefly residing in New York City before permanently settling in Paterson, New Jersey. He soon found work as a bobbin boy in one of Paterson’s many mills.

He was exposed to labor politics at a young age, and by 1897 was serving as president of the city’s Eastside Workingmen’s Association. He studied stenography and eventually became well established in the courtrooms of Passaic and Bergen counties.

Following his voluntary service during the Spanish–American War of 1898, Hughes returned to Paterson and pursued legal studies. After admittance to the bar in 1900 he earned local renown for defending local silk workers who were prosecuted after striking for better pay in 1901.

== U.S. House of Representatives (1903–05, 1907–12) ==
In 1902, he ran for congress as a Democrat against wealthy and well-connected linen tycoon William Barbour, who owned the very factory that Billy had worked in as a “bobbin boy” decades earlier. In a stunning upset, Hughes bested Barbour despite running in a district that usually produced huge Republican majorities. Although Hughes was defeated for reelection by Henry C. Allen in 1904, he went on to win subsequent terms in 1906, 1908, and 1910.

Throughout his time in Congress he was an outspoken advocate for the causes of working people, specifically the legislative priorities of the American Federation of Labor. His efforts as a lawmaker, though not always successful, earned the attention of many workers and union leaders across the country.

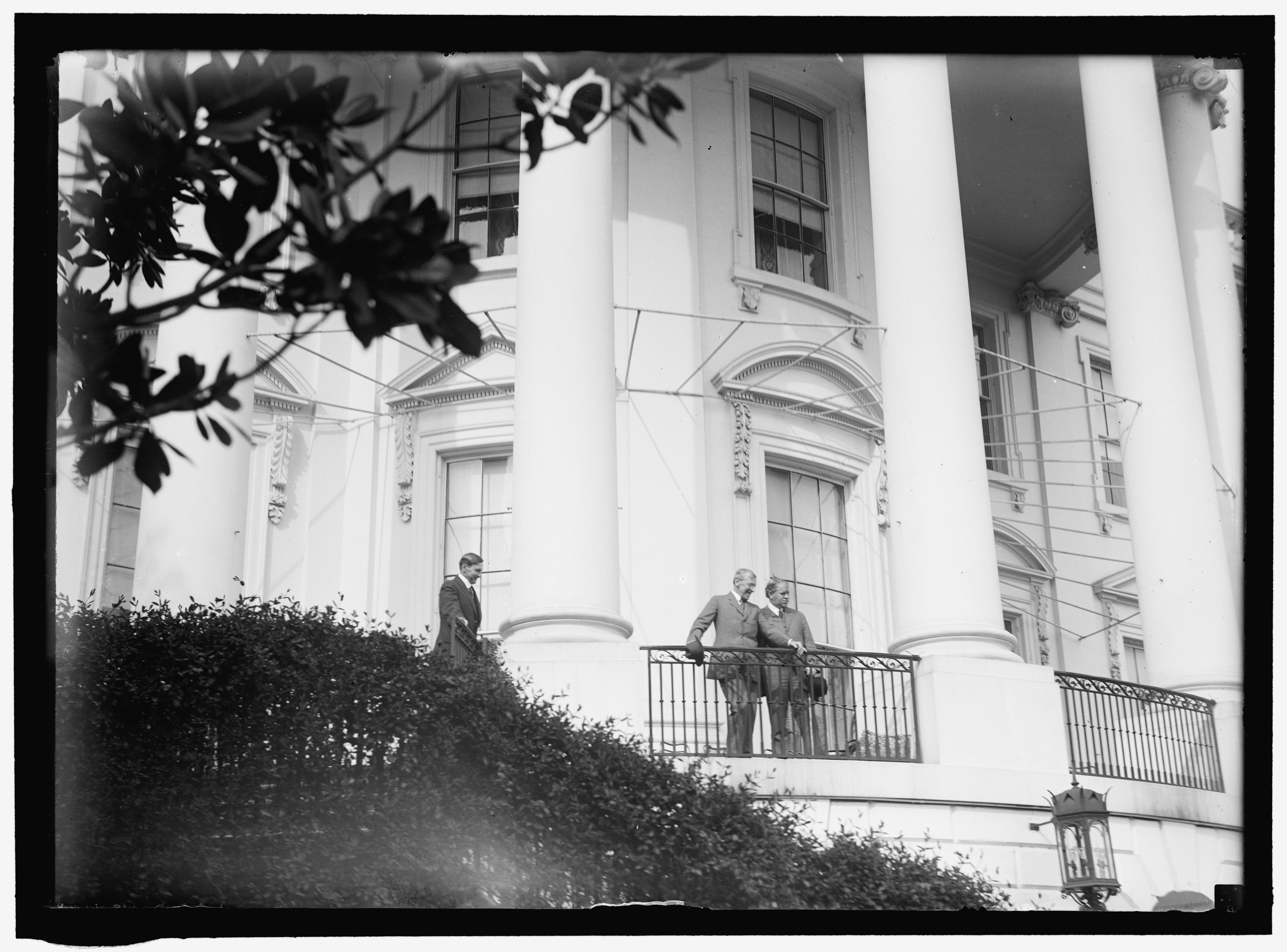
President Woodrow Wilson and Senator William Hughes on the White House south balcony in 1913.

== U.S. Senate (1913–17) ==
With New Jersey Governor Woodrow Wilson’s endorsement, Hughes ran for the United States Senate in 1912, and as a result of his victory became the first union card-carrying member of that body. For the next five years he exerted great influence on local, state, and national politics. As a close ally of then President Wilson, he was integral in many of the progressive reforms undertaken between 1913 and 1917.

Highlights from his list of legislative initiatives include:

- His efforts to amend the Sherman Antitrust Act so that it could not be used by the Department of Justice to prosecute labor organizations.
- His support for child labor legislation and public education.
- His role in crafting the Underwood Tariff Act of 1913, which lowered tariffs in a huge win for labor.
- His bill to implement an 8-hour work day for all federal government contractors.
- His bill creating the U.S. Commission on Industrial Relations, which helped to investigate the causes of the 1913 Paterson Silk Strike and influenced labor policy after World War I and during the New Deal.
- His advocacy for doubling enlisted soldier pay upon U.S. entry into World War I.

=== Death in office ===
Hughes developed an illness beginning the Spring of 1917 from which he never recovered. He was one of the youngest men ever elected to the Senate, and one of the youngest to die in that office at just 45 years of age. American Federation of Labor President Samuel Gompers declared Hughes’s death “an irreparable loss to the councils of labor,” while President Wilson lamented “I have lost a friend for whom I had the deepest affection and a very genuine admiration.”

More than 5,000 workers from Paterson and surrounding towns attended the funeral of “Our Billy,” bearing the brutally cold February weather to pay their respects. In a sign that he never sought to profit off of his public service, he was buried in an unmarked grave in Paterson’s Cedar Lawn Cemetery.

=== Legacy ===
Nearly a decade later, union workers and labor organizations from Paterson and around the country funded the construction of a monument honoring the life and legacy of Billy Hughes. Designed by celebrated Italian-American sculptor Gaetano Federici, it stands in front of the Passaic County Courthouse to this day as a testament to his personal achievements and public service.

== Personal life ==
He married Margaret Hughes (no relation) in 1898 and fathered two daughters, Phyllis (born 1901) and Ruth (born 1909).

== See also ==
- List of United States senators born outside the United States
- List of members of the United States Congress who died in office (1900–1949)

== Sources ==
- "HUGHES, William". Biographical Directory of the United States Congress.
- William Hughes, late a senator from New Jersey, Memorial addresses delivered in the House of Representatives and Senate frontispiece 1919
- Daniel Willever, Made in Paterson: The Life and Legacy of U.S. Senator William Hughes (2023)

U.S. House of Representatives
Preceded by Richard W. Parker	Member of the U.S. House of Representatives from New Jersey's 6th congressional district 1903–1905	Succeeded by Henry C. Allen
Preceded by Henry C. Allen	Member of the U.S. House of Representatives from New Jersey's 6th congressional district 1907–1912	Succeeded by Archibald C. Hart
U.S. Senate
Preceded by Frank O. Briggs	U.S. senator (Class 2) from New Jersey; 1913–1918; Served alongside: James E. Martine	Succeeded by David Baird
