= List of United States senators born outside the United States =

This is a list of United States senators born outside the United States. It includes senators born in foreign countries (whether to American or foreign parents). The list also includes senators born in territories outside the United States that were later incorporated into the United States (except for those born in the British colonies and territories in North America (or in the temporarily independent former British colonies and territories in North America) that would go on to form the United States of America).

Name	Birthplace (current country)	Then the territory of	State(s) represented	Party	Years
David H. Armstrong	Canada (Note: Born in the British colony of Nova Scotia, in present-day Canada.)	United Kingdom of Great Britain and Ireland	Missouri	Democratic	1877–1879
David Baird	United Kingdom	United Kingdom of Great Britain and Ireland	New Jersey	Republican	1918–1919
Edward Baker	United Kingdom	United Kingdom of Great Britain and Ireland	Oregon	Republican	1860–1861
James B. Beck	United Kingdom	United Kingdom of Great Britain and Ireland	Kentucky	Democratic	1877–1890
Judah P. Benjamin	U.S. Virgin Islands (Note: Born in Saint Croix, at the time part of the Danish West Indies under British occupation, in what is now the U.S. Virgin Islands.)	(Denmark) Danish Virgin Islands	Louisiana	Whig	1853–1859
Judah P. Benjamin	U.S. Virgin Islands	(Denmark) Danish Virgin Islands	Louisiana	Democratic	1859–1861
Michael Bennet	India		Colorado	Democratic	2009–present
Hiram Bingham	United States (Note: Born in what was then the independent Kingdom of Hawaii.)	Kingdom of Hawaii	Connecticut	Republican	1924–1933
Rudy Boschwitz	Germany	Weimar Germany	Minnesota	Republican	1978–1991
Charles Bouligny	United States (Note: Born in the Spanish colony of Louisiana.)	Spanish Empire	Louisiana	Democratic-Republican	1824–1828
Charles Bouligny	United States	Spanish Empire	Louisiana	National Republican	1828–1829
Pierce Butler	Ireland	Kingdom of Ireland	South Carolina	Pro-Administration	1789–1791
Pierce Butler	Ireland	Kingdom of Ireland	South Carolina	Anti-Administration	1791–1795
Pierce Butler	Ireland	Kingdom of Ireland	South Carolina	Democratic-Republican	1795–1796, 1802–1804
George W. Campbell	United Kingdom	Kingdom of Great Britain	Tennessee	Democratic-Republican	1811–1814, 1815–1818
Eugene Casserly	Ireland	United Kingdom of Great Britain and Ireland	California	Democratic	1869–1873
Charles W. Cathcart	Portugal (Note: Born in Funchal, on Madeira Island, to American parents.)	Kingdom of Portugal	Indiana	Democratic	1852–1853
John Conness	Ireland	United Kingdom of Great Britain and Ireland	California	Democratic	1863–1869
James Couzens	Canada	United Kingdom of Great Britain and Ireland	Michigan	Republican	1922–1936
Ted Cruz	Canada		Texas	Republican	2013–present
James J. Davis	United Kingdom	United Kingdom of Great Britain and Ireland	Pennsylvania	Republican	1930–1945
Jean Destréhan	United States (Note: Born in the French colony of Louisiana.)	New France	Louisiana	Democratic-Republican	1812
Tammy Duckworth	Thailand		Illinois	Democratic	2017–present
Charles E. Dudley	United Kingdom	Kingdom of Great Britain	New York	Jacksonian Democrat	1829–1833
James Graham Fair	United Kingdom	United Kingdom of Great Britain and Ireland	Nevada	Democratic	1881–1887
Eligius Fromentin	France	Kingdom of France	Louisiana	Democratic-Republican	1813–1819
Albert Gallatin	Switzerland (Note: Born in Geneva, at the time part of the Republic of Geneva and now part of Switzerland.)	Republic of Geneva	Pennsylvania	Democratic-Republican	1793–1794 (Note: Gallatin won election to the Senate in 1793, and took the oath of office, but on the same day a petition was filed by nineteen Pennsylvania Federalists protesting that Gallatin did not have the minimum nine years of citizenship required to be a senator. After two months of deliberation, the matter went before a Senate vote where Gallatin was removed from the Senate with a party-line vote of 14–12.)
Jacob Gallinger	Canada (Note: Born in the British colony of Upper Canada, in present-day Canada.)	United Kingdom of Great Britain and Ireland	New Hampshire	Republican	1891–1918
Frank Gooding	United Kingdom	United Kingdom of Great Britain and Ireland	Idaho	Republican	1921–1928
William Harper	Antigua and Barbuda (Note: Born in the British colony of Antigua, in what is now the independent country of Antigua and Barbuda.)	United Kingdom of Great Britain and Ireland	South Carolina	Jacksonian Democrat	1826
S. I. Hayakawa	Canada	Canada	California	Republican	1977–1983
Felix Hebert	Canada	United Kingdom of Great Britain and Ireland	Rhode Island	Republican	1929–1935
Mazie Hirono	Japan		Hawaii	Democratic	2013–present
William Hughes	Ireland	United Kingdom of Great Britain and Ireland	New Jersey	Democratic	1913–1918
James Jackson	United Kingdom	Kingdom of Great Britain	Georgia	Anti-Administration	1793–1795
James Jackson	United Kingdom	Kingdom of Great Britain	Georgia	Democratic-Republican	1801–1806
Magnus Johnson	Sweden	United Kingdoms of Sweden and Norway	Minnesota	Farmer-Labor	1923–1925
Samuel Johnston	United Kingdom	Kingdom of Great Britain	North Carolina	Pro-Administration	1789–1793
Charles Jones	Ireland	United Kingdom of Great Britain and Ireland	Florida	Democratic	1875–1887
John Jones	United Kingdom	United Kingdom of Great Britain and Ireland	Nevada	Republican	1873–1895
John Jones	United Kingdom	United Kingdom of Great Britain and Ireland	Nevada	Silver	1895–1901
John Jones	United Kingdom	United Kingdom of Great Britain and Ireland	Nevada	Republican	1901–1903
Thomas Kearns	Canada	United Kingdom of Great Britain and Ireland	Utah	Republican	1901–1905
Octaviano Larrazolo	Mexico	Second Federal Republic of Mexico	New Mexico	Republican	1928–1929
John Laurance	United Kingdom	Kingdom of Great Britain	New York	Federalist	1796–1800
William Lorimer	United Kingdom	United Kingdom of Great Britain and Ireland	Illinois	Republican	1909–1912
Walter Lowrie	United Kingdom	Kingdom of Great Britain	Pennsylvania	Democratic-Republican	1819–1825
Stephen Mallory	Trinidad and Tobago (Note: Born in the British colony of Trinidad, in present-day Trinidad and Tobago.)	United Kingdom of Great Britain and Ireland	Florida	Democratic	1851–1861
Lee Mantle	United Kingdom	United Kingdom of Great Britain and Ireland	Montana	Republican	1895–1896
Lee Mantle	United Kingdom	United Kingdom of Great Britain and Ireland	Montana	Silver Republican	1896–1899
Mel Martínez	Cuba	Republic of Cuba	Florida	Republican	2005–2009
John McCain	Panama (Note: Born in the Panama Canal Zone. In accordance with the under Hay–Bunau-Varilla Treaty, the Canal Zone remained sovereign Panamanian territory while operating under American administration.)	Panama	Arizona	Republican	1987–2018
James McMillan	Canada	United Kingdom of Great Britain and Ireland	Michigan	Republican	1889–1902
Joseph Millard	Canada	United Kingdom of Great Britain and Ireland	Nebraska	Republican	1901–1907
Bernie Moreno	Colombia		Ohio	Republican	2025–present
Robert Morris	United Kingdom	Kingdom of Great Britain	Pennsylvania	Pro-Administration	1789–1795
John Moses	Norway	United Kingdoms of Sweden and Norway	North Dakota	Democratic	1945
James E. Murray	Canada	United Kingdom of Great Britain and Ireland	Montana	Democratic	1934–1961
Knute Nelson	Norway	United Kingdoms of Sweden and Norway	Minnesota	Republican	1895–1923
James Nesmith	Canada (Note: Born in the British colony of New Brunswick, in present-day Canada, to American parents.)	United Kingdom of Great Britain and Ireland	Oregon	Democratic	1861–1867
Samuel Nicholson	Canada (Note: Born in the British colony of Prince Edward Island, in present-day Canada.)	United Kingdom of Great Britain and Ireland	Colorado	Republican	1921–1923
George T. Oliver	United Kingdom	United Kingdom of Great Britain and Ireland	Pennsylvania	Republican	1909–1917
Samuel Pasco	United Kingdom	United Kingdom of Great Britain and Ireland	Florida	Democratic	1887–1899
William Paterson	United Kingdom	Kingdom of Ireland	New Jersey	Pro-Administration	1789–1790
Thomas Patterson	Ireland	United Kingdom of Great Britain and Ireland	Colorado	Democratic	1901–1907
Alexander Porter	Ireland	United Kingdom of Great Britain and Ireland	Louisiana	Whig	1833–1837
Edward Robertson	United Kingdom	United Kingdom of Great Britain and Ireland	Wyoming	Republican	1943–1949
Carl Schurz	Germany (Note: Born in the Kingdom of Prussia, in present-day Germany.)	Kingdom of Prussia	Missouri	Republican	1869–1870, 1872–1875
Carl Schurz	Germany	Kingdom of Prussia	Missouri	Liberal Republican	1870–1872
William Joyce Sewell	Ireland	United Kingdom of Great Britain and Ireland	New Jersey	Republican	1881–1887, 1895–1901
James Shields	United Kingdom	United Kingdom of Great Britain and Ireland	Illinois	Democratic	1849–1855
James Shields	United Kingdom	United Kingdom of Great Britain and Ireland	Minnesota	Democratic	1858–1859
James Shields	United Kingdom	United Kingdom of Great Britain and Ireland	Missouri	Democratic	1879
Joseph Simon	Germany (Note: Born in the Grand Duchy of Hesse, in present-day Germany.)	Grand Duchy of Hesse	Oregon	Republican	1898–1903
Pierre Soulé	France	First French Republic	Louisiana	Democratic	1847, 1849–1853
Isaac Stephenson	Canada (Note: Born in the British colony of New Brunswick, in present-day Canada.)	United Kingdom of Great Britain and Ireland	Wisconsin	Republican	1907–1915
Patrick Joseph Sullivan	Ireland	United Kingdom of Great Britain and Ireland	Wyoming	Republican	1929–1930
George Sutherland	United Kingdom	United Kingdom of Great Britain and Ireland	Utah	Republican	1905–1917
Thomas Taggart	Ireland	United Kingdom of Great Britain and Ireland	Indiana	Democratic	1916
Edward Tiffin	United Kingdom	Kingdom of Great Britain	Ohio	Democratic-Republican	1807–1809
Chris Van Hollen	Pakistan		Maryland	Democratic	2017–present
Robert Wagner	Germany	German Empire	New York	Democratic	1927–1949
Patrick Walsh	Ireland	United Kingdom of Great Britain and Ireland	Georgia	Democratic	1894–1895
Lowell Weicker	France	French Third Republic	Connecticut	Republican	1971–1989
George Wetmore	United Kingdom	United Kingdom of Great Britain and Ireland	Rhode Island	Republican	1895–1907, 1908–1913
David Levy Yulee	U.S. Virgin Islands (Note: Born in Saint Thomas, at the time part of the Danish West Indies under British occupation, in what is now the U.S. Virgin Islands.)	United Kingdom of Great Britain and Ireland	Florida	Democratic	1845–1851, 1855–1861

Birthplaces of incumbent foreign-born United States senators

== See also ==
- List of current United States senators
- List of United States governors born outside the United States
- Natural-born-citizen clause (United States)
