= Henry C. Allen (New Jersey politician) =

American politician

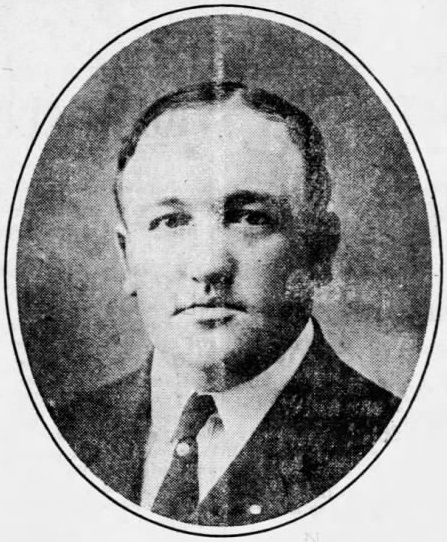
- Great Falls Tribune (Great Falls, MT), February 5, 1906.

Member of the U.S. House of Representatives from New Jersey's 6th district
- In office March 4, 1905 – March 3, 1907
- Preceded by: William Hughes
- Succeeded by: William Hughes

Personal details
- Born: Henry Crosby Allen; May 13, 1872 Paterson, New Jersey, U.S.
- Died: March 7, 1942 (aged 69) Mystic, Connecticut, U.S.
- Resting place: Cedar Lawn Cemetery
- Party: Republican

Henry Crosby Allen (May 13, 1872, Paterson, New Jersey – March 7, 1942, Mystic, Connecticut) was an American lawyer and Republican Party politician who represented New Jersey's 6th congressional district in the United States House of Representatives for one term from 1905 to 1907.

== Early life and education ==
Martin was born in Paterson, New Jersey on May 13, 1872. He attended private and public schools in his native city, and graduated from St Paul's School in Garden City, New York in 1889, from Yale University in 1893, and from the New York Law School in 1895. He was admitted to the bar in 1895 and commenced practice in Paterson.

== Congress ==
Martin was elected as a Republican to the Fifty-ninth Congress, serving in office from March 4, 1905 – March 3, 1907, but was not a candidate for renomination in 1906.

== Post-Congress ==
After leaving Congress, he resumed the practice of law in Paterson, and served as the postmaster of Paterson from 1926 to 1935.

=== Death and burial ===
He died in Mystic, Connecticut on March 7, 1942, while visiting his daughter. He was interred in Cedar Lawn Cemetery in Paterson.

U.S. House of Representatives
Preceded by William Hughes	Member of the U.S. House of Representatives from New Jersey's 6th congressional district March 4, 1905–March 3, 1907	Succeeded by William Hughes
