= David Baird Sr. =

American politician

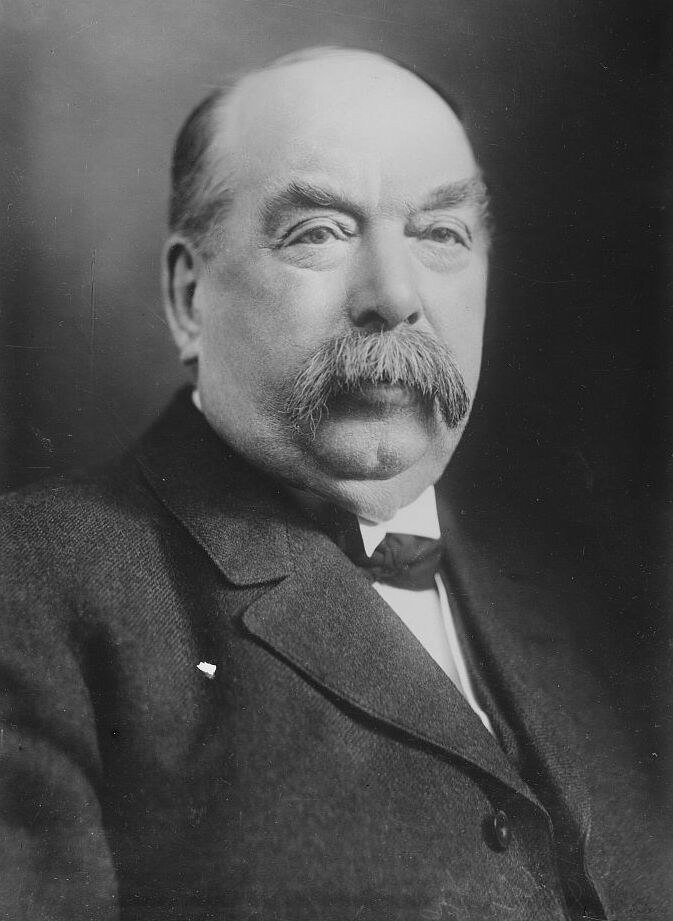
- Baird in 1918

United States Senator from New Jersey
- In office February 23, 1918 – March 3, 1919
- Appointed by: Walter E. Edge
- Preceded by: William Hughes
- Succeeded by: Walter E. Edge

Sheriff of Camden County, New Jersey
- In office 1895–1897
- In office 1887–1889

Member of the Camden County Board of Chosen Freeholders
- In office 1876–1880

Personal details
- Born: April 7, 1839 Derry, County Londonderry, Ireland
- Died: February 25, 1927 (aged 87) Camden, New Jersey, U.S.
- Resting place: Harleigh Cemetery, Camden
- Party: Republican
- Children: David Baird Jr.

David Baird Sr. (April 7, 1839 – February 25, 1927) was an Irish-born American lumber merchant, banker, and Republican Party politician who represented New Jersey in the United States Senate from 1918 to 1919.

== Early life ==
David Baird was born on April 7, 1839 in County Londonderry, Ireland. His father was a middle-class contractor and the family were Scotch-Irish Covenanters.

== Business career ==
Baird immigrated to the United States in 1856 and worked on a farm in Port Deposit, Maryland, husking corn and peddling eggs and potatoes in exchange for boarding and meager-to-zero wages of up to $6/month. During the winter, a customer offered him a job as a raft hand for $2/day with Gillingham & Garrison, a leading Philadelphia lumber merchant firm. He accepted and remained with the firm for many decades. In 1860, the firm moved to Camden, New Jersey. In addition to piloting rafts, his job involved rolling freight on hand trucks from the Camden & Amboy trains to the Camden docks for an additional 20 cents/hour.

He remained with Gillingham & Garrison until 1874, when he started an independent lumber business with his wife, who worked as cashier, bookkeeper, and business advisor, relying on his reputation and connections in . His firm shipped timber from the Pennsylvania woods via the Susquehanna River before expanding to New York, Michigan, and the South. He succeeded by predicting his rivals' efforts to corner a particular market and leveraging his experience as a master raftsman to beat them to the market with his own lumber.

Through his lumber business, he became acquainted with Russell Alger, a lumber baron who became Governor of Michigan, a United States Senator, and United States Secretary of War. They became close friends and political allies and remained so until Alger's death in 1907.

Baird's business extended beyond lumber; when the Merchantville Water Company in the Camden suburbs was in danger of bankruptcy, he acquired it, reorganized the company, rebuilt its plant and delivered water to the citizens of Merchantville. Later in his life, he was president of the First National Bank of Camden and after its merger with National State Bank, chairman of the board.

== Political career ==
=== State and local politics ===
Baird entered local politics around 1870, as a member of the Republican Party. He was a member of the Camden County Board of Chosen Freeholders from 1876 to 1880, representing the first ward.

In 1886, Thomas Haines Dudley sought to gain control of the Camden County machine from U.S. senator William J. Sewell. To defeat the challenge, Sewell recruited Baird to run for sheriff on a ticket led by state senator Richard N. Herring. Baird was the only Republican to win an election in Camden County that year, and Sewell lost his seat in the U.S. Senate. Baird served as sheriff from 1887 to 1889 and again from 1895 to 1897.

When the "Committee of 100," a prominent good government citizens' movement, gained control of the Camden municipal government, Baird opposed them with support from Russell Alger. As an at-large delegate to the 1888 Republican National Convention, he publicly supported Alger's campaign for the presidency. He also served as a delegate to the conventions of 1892, 1896, 1908, and 1916. In 1916, he chaired the New Jersey delegation.

He was a member of the state board of tax assessors in 1895 and from 1901 to 1909, serving as its president in 1908. In 1907, he was instrumental in securing the election of John Franklin Fort as governor of New Jersey. However, Fort and Baird soon became rivals, and Baird refused to serve another term on the state board.

=== United States Senate (1918–19) ===
In 1910, following the death of Sewell, Baird sought election to the United States Senate. At the time, senators were elected by the state legislatures, and the New Jersey legislature was controlled by the Republican Party. His opponents were John F. Dryden, former governor Edward C. Stokes, Barker Gummere, and John J. Gardner. The Republican nomination went to Dryden, and Baird supported his election. They remained friends until Dryden's death in 1911.

On February 23, 1918, Governor Walter Edge appointed Baird to fill the seat left vacant by the death of William Hughes. In the special election to complete the term, he was unopposed for the Republican nomination and defeated Charles O'Connor Hennessy in the general election. He did not stand for the concurrent election to the subsequent full term, and he left office on March 3, 1919. During his brief term in the Senate, Baird opposed the Nineteenth Amendment to the United States Constitution, which guarantees the right to vote regardless of sex, and suffragists opposed his re-election.

After leaving the Senate, he remained the leading figure in the Republican Party in South Jersey.

== Personal life ==
Baird married Christianna Beatty in Philadelphia. She died around 1897. They had four children:

- Mary Baird Fox;
- Irvine Baird;
- Christianna Baird Humphreys; and
- David Baird Jr.

Their son David Jr. was his primary heir and also served as a United States Senator from New Jersey from 1929 to 1930.

=== Death and legacy ===
He died in Camden on February 25, 1927 after a grave illness and was interred in Harleigh Cemetery. Former president William Howard Taft was a pallbearer at his funeral, as were U.S. senators Walter E. Edge, Edward I. Edwards, and James E. Watson. The U.S. Senate adopted a resolution of regret, and flags throughout Camden were flown at half staff.

After his death, his estate was recorded at a value of $1.75 million (approximately $25.36 million today) with other estimates suggesting it was worth as much as $5 million (approximately $72 million today). It was divided among his family, with special bequests made to his staff, Cooper Hospital, the Camden Home for Friendless Children, and the Methodist Home for the Aged.

== See also ==
- Federal government of the United States
- List of United States senators born outside the United States
- Politics of the United States

== Notes ==
Party political offices
Preceded by First	Republican Nominee for the U.S. Senate (Class 2) from New Jersey; 1918	Succeeded by Walter Evans Edge
U.S. Senate
Preceded by William Hughes	U.S. Senator (Class 2) from New Jersey; 1918–1919	Succeeded by Walter Evans Edge
