= John Kean (New Jersey politician) =

American politician (1852-1914)

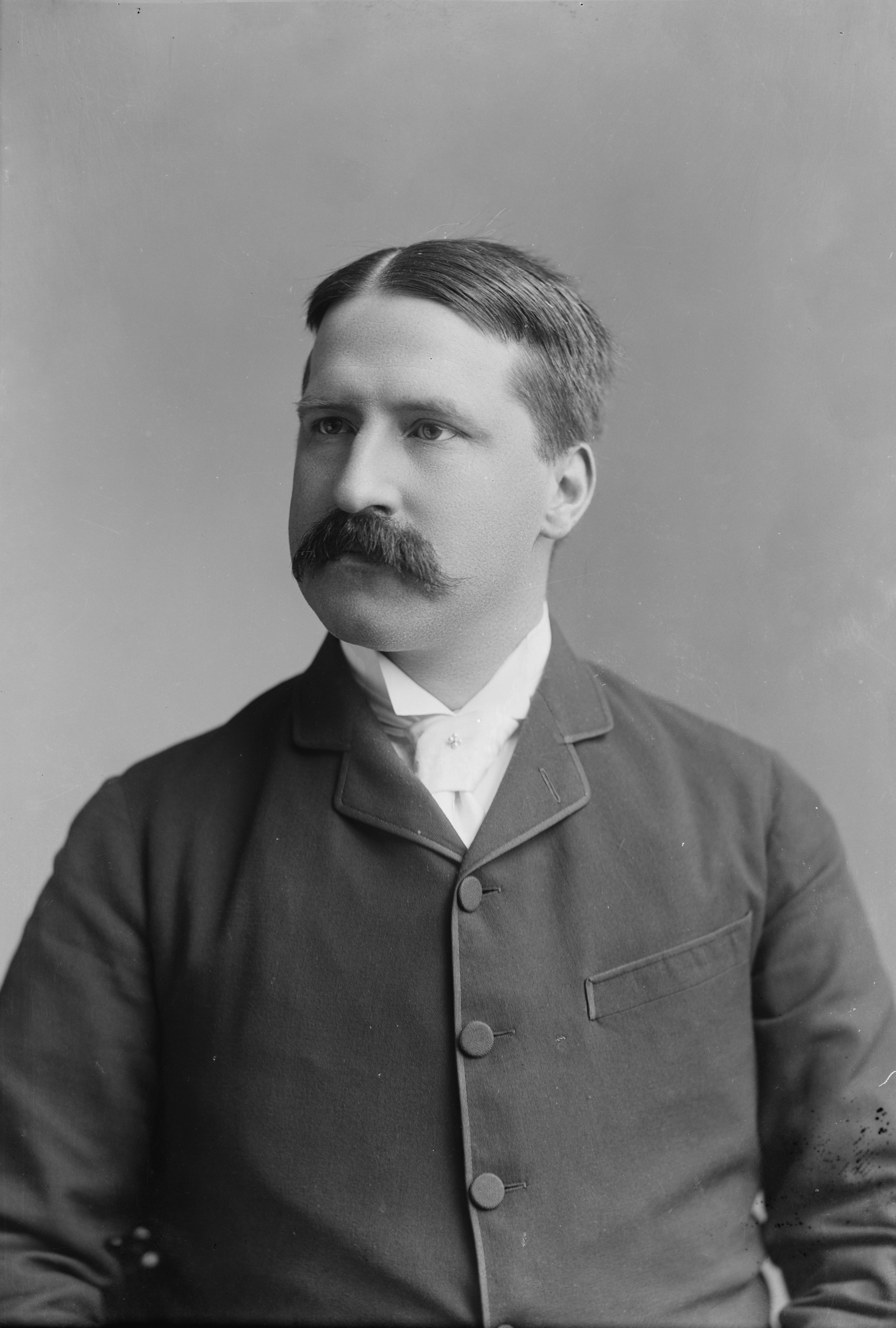
- Kean c. 1880s
- In office March 4, 1899 – March 3, 1911
- Preceded by: James Smith, Jr.
- Succeeded by: James Edgar Martine

Member of the U.S. House of Representatives from New Jersey's 3rd district
- In office March 4, 1883 – March 3, 1885
- Preceded by: Miles Ross
- Succeeded by: Robert Stockton Green
- In office March 4, 1887 – March 3, 1889
- Preceded by: Robert Stockton Green
- Succeeded by: Jacob Augustus Geissenhainer

Personal details
- Born: December 4, 1852 Elizabeth, New Jersey, U.S.
- Died: November 4, 1914 (aged 61) Elizabeth, New Jersey, U.S.
- Party: Republican
- Relations: Thomas Kean (grandnephew); John Kean (great-grandfather); Hamilton Fish Kean (brother); Robert Kean (nephew); Emlen Roosevelt (brother-in-law)
- Parent(s): John Kean; Lucinetta Halsted
- Education: Yale College; Columbia Law School
- Profession: Politician

John Kean (December 4, 1852 – November 4, 1914) was an American attorney, banker and Republican Party politician from Elizabeth, New Jersey. He represented New Jersey in the U.S. Senate from 1899 to 1911 and served two separate terms in the United States House of Representatives, from 1883 to 1885, and from 1887 to 1889. A member of the Kean family of politicians, his great-grandfather, John Kean, had been a delegate to the Continental Congress for South Carolina, his brother was U.S. Senator Hamilton Fish Kean, his nephew was U.S. Representative Robert Kean and his great-nephew was Governor Thomas Kean.

== Early life and education ==
Kean was born on December 4, 1852, at Liberty Hall at present-day Kean University, then called "Ursino", near Elizabeth, New Jersey. Kean was the son of Lucinetta "Lucy" (née Halsted) and Col. John Kean. He was related to several prominent American politicians including his great-grandfather John Kean, and great-uncle Hamilton Fish. His younger brother was Hamilton Fish Kean. His maternal grandfather was Caleb O. Halsted, president of the Bank of the Manhattan Company.

He studied in private schools and attended Yale College. He graduated from Columbia Law School in New York City in 1875. He was admitted to the New Jersey bar in 1877, but did not engage in extensive practice.

== Career ==
He worked in banking and manufacturing before entering politics. He was elected as a Republican to represent New Jersey's 3rd congressional district in the 48th United States Congress, serving from March 4, 1883, to March 3, 1885. He was an unsuccessful candidate for reelection in 1884.

He was later elected to the 50th United States Congress, serving from March 4, 1887, to March 3, 1889, when he was again an unsuccessful candidate for reelection in 1888. He was named Chairman of the New Jersey Republican State Committee in 1891, resigning the following year to run as the Republican candidate for Governor of New Jersey. He lost the 1892 gubernatorial race to Democrat George Theodore Werts. He was a member of the committee to revise the judiciary system of New Jersey.

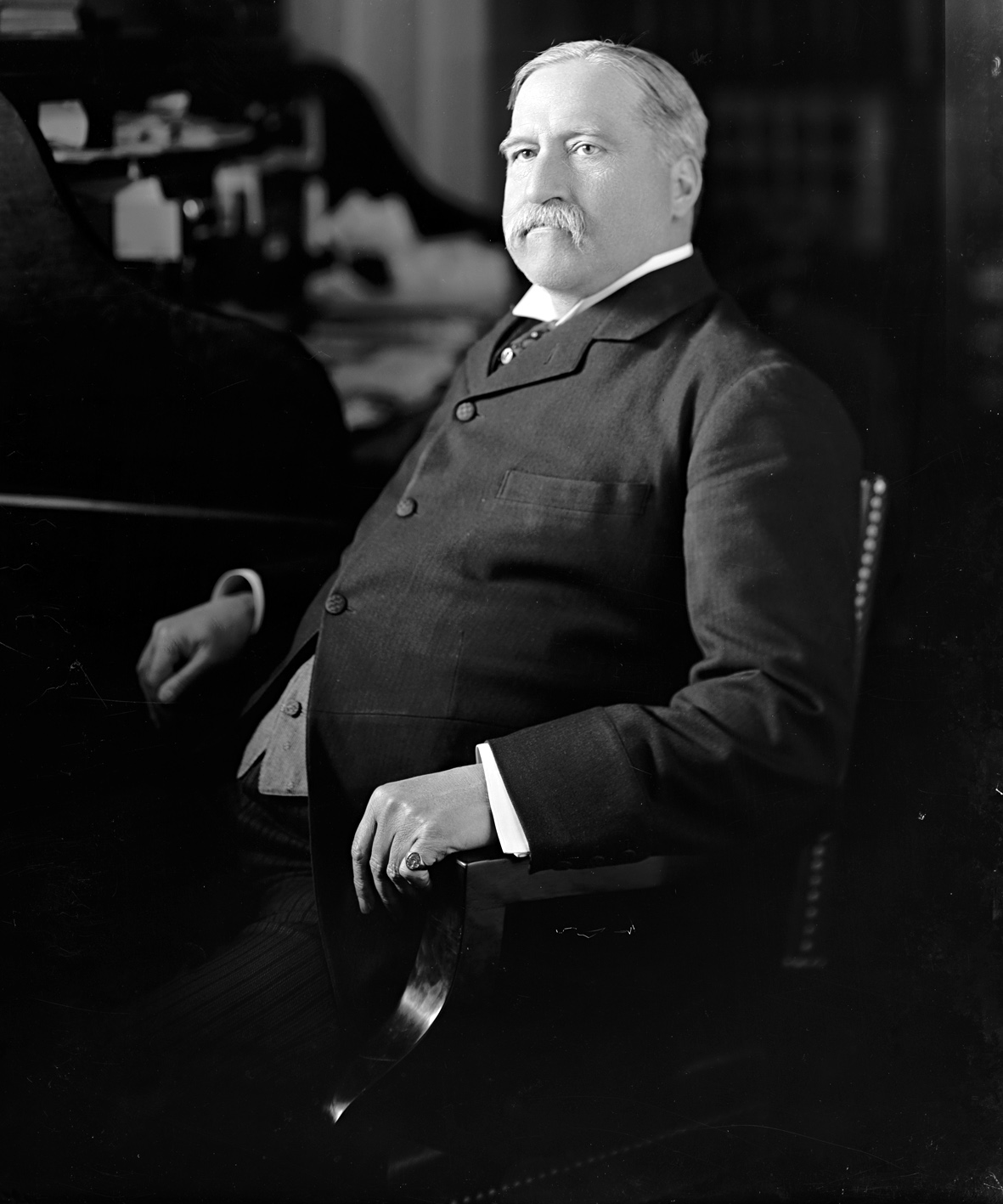
Kean c. 1905–1914 as United States Senator.

He was elected to the United States Senate in 1899 and reelected in 1905, serving in the Senate from March 4, 1899, to March 3, 1911. He was chairman of the Committee on the Geological Survey (Fifty-seventh United States Congress) and Committee to Audit and Control the Contingent Expenses (Fifty-eighth United States Congress through Sixty-first United States Congress).

After politics, he re-engaged in banking in Elizabeth, New Jersey.

== Personal life ==
He died at "Ursino" on November 4, 1914, after developing Bright's disease. Kean, who was one of nine children, did not marry, in fact, only two of his siblings, brother Hamilton Fish Kean, who married Katharine Taylor Winthrop, and sister Christine Griffin Kean, who married Emlen Roosevelt, married. He was interred in Evergreen Cemetery, in Hillside, New Jersey.

=== Legacy ===
Keansburg, New Jersey is named in honor of John Kean. In 1884, Kean played a key part in helping the town, at the time called Granville, to obtain its first post office. During that year, the name Keansburg was adopted.

U.S. House of Representatives
Preceded by Miles Ross	Member of the U.S. House of Representatives from New Jersey's 3rd congressional district March 4, 1883 – March 3, 1885	Succeeded by Robert Stockton Green
Preceded by Robert Stockton Green	Member of the U.S. House of Representatives from New Jersey's 3rd congressional district March 4, 1887 – March 3, 1889	Succeeded by Jacob Augustus Geissenhainer
U.S. Senate
Preceded by James Smith, Jr.	U.S. senator (Class 1) from New Jersey; March 4, 1899 – March 3, 1911; Served alongside: Sewell, Dryden, Briggs	Succeeded by James Edgar Martine
Party political offices
Preceded by Garret Hobart	Chairman of the New Jersey Republican State Committee; 1891–1892	Succeeded by Franklin Murphy
Preceded by Edward Burd Grubb, Jr.	Republican Nominee for Governor of New Jersey; 1892	Succeeded by John W. Griggs
