= John Wesley Wescott =

American lawyer (1849-1927)

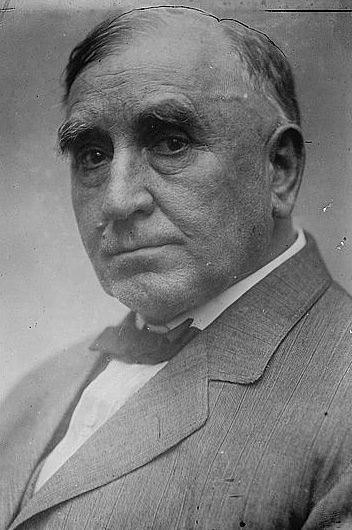
John W. Wescott

John Wesley Wescott (February 20, 1849 – June 11, 1927) was an American lawyer and jurist who served as Attorney General of New Jersey from 1914 to 1919. He had the distinction of making the nominating speech for Woodrow Wilson at the Democratic National Convention in both 1912 and 1916.

== Early life ==
Wescott was born in Waterford Township, New Jersey, in 1849 to John and Catherine (Bozarth) Wescott. He attended Wilbraham Wesleyan Academy in Wilbraham, Massachusetts before entering Yale College, where he graduated in 1872. He then attended Yale Law School, graduating in 1876. At Yale, he was active in football, rowing, baseball, wrestling, and boxing, and also won high honors for oratory and English composition.

== Legal and political career ==
After returning to New Jersey, Wescott was admitted to the bar as an attorney in 1878 and a counsellor in 1881. He practiced law in Camden County, and in 1885 was appointed by Governor Leon Abbett to be Presiding Judge of the Common Pleas for the county.

Wescott was a Democrat and was named a presidential elector for Grover Cleveland in 1892. In the race for the Democratic nomination for Governor of New Jersey in 1910, Wescott supported the candidacy of Frank S. Katzenbach, who had narrowly lost to John Franklin Fort in the previous election. Woodrow Wilson beat out Katzenbach for the Democratic nomination and won Wescott's support in his successful campaign for governor.

When Wilson's name was put into nomination at the 1912 Democratic National Convention in Baltimore, he sought out Wescott from the New Jersey delegation to give the nominating speech. Four years later, at the 1916 Convention in St. Louis, Wilson again selected Wescott to present his name for nomination.

In 1914 Governor James F. Fielder appointed Wescott to a five-year term as Attorney General of New Jersey. His name was put forth as a Democratic candidate for United States Senate in 1914 and 1916.

After World War I, Wescott was a strong advocate of President Wilson's attempts to have the United States enter the League of Nations. He was the head of the group Woodrow Wilson Democracy and promoted a pro-League of Nations plank in the Democratic Party platform at the 1924 Convention.

== Death ==
In 1927 Wescott died at his home in Haddonfield, New Jersey, at the age of 78. He was survived by his wife, Francis Marie Louise Leclerc Prior (married January 1, 1875), and his three sons Henry D. (born 1876), Ethan P. (born 1881), and Ralph W. (born 1883), all lawyers.

Legal offices
Preceded by Edmund Wilson	Attorney General of New Jersey; 1914 – 1919	Succeeded by Thomas F. McCran
