= Franklin Murphy (politician) =

American politician (1846–1920)

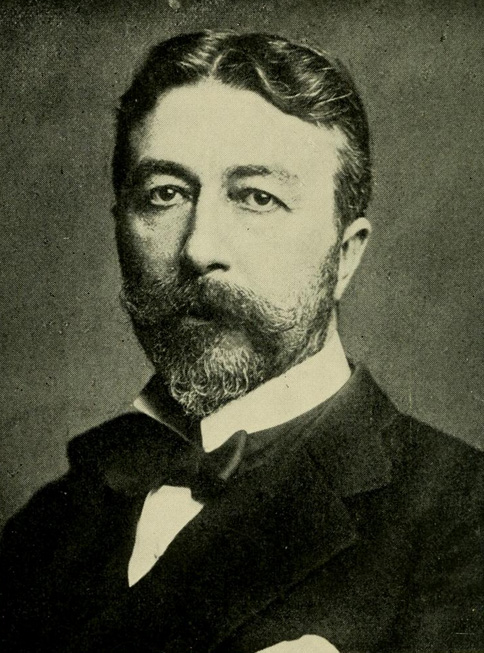

31st Governor of New Jersey
- In office January 21, 1902 – January 17, 1905
- Preceded by: Foster McGowan Voorhees
- Succeeded by: Edward C. Stokes

Member of the New Jersey General Assembly
- In office 1885

Personal details
- Born: January 3, 1846 Jersey City, New Jersey, U.S.
- Died: February 24, 1920 (aged 74) Palm Beach, Florida, U.S.
- Party: Republican
- Spouse: Janet Colwell
- Children: 2

Franklin Murphy (January 3, 1846 – February 24, 1920) was an American Republican Party politician, who served as the 31st governor of New Jersey, from 1902 to 1905. He was the founder of the Murphy Varnish Company in Newark, New Jersey.

== Civil War Service ==
Born in Jersey City, New Jersey, he was attending Newark Academy when the American Civil War started. In July 1862, he enlisted in the Union Army, despite being only 16 years old, and was mustered in as a private in Company A, 13th New Jersey Volunteer Infantry on July 19, 1862. He rose in rank during his field service, being promoted to corporal on August 25, 1862, to second lieutenant on February 22, 1863, and to first lieutenant on February 24, 1864. His regiment fought in the Battles of Antietam, Chancellorsvile, Gettysburg, the Atlanta campaign, the "March to the Sea", and Bentonville. He was honorably mustered out of service on June 8, 1865.

== Personal life ==
After leaving military service, Murphy founded the Murphy Varnish Company in Newark in 1865. In 1868 he married Janet Colwell of Newark and they had two children. In addition to politics, he was involved in several civic pursuits, to include serving as a member of the Essex County Park Commission, a board member for the National Home for Disabled Volunteer Soldiers, and heading the committee that planned the 250th anniversary of the founding of Newark. Additionally, he served as the President General of the National Society, Sons of the American Revolution from 1898 to 1900.

== Political life ==
Murphy was active in Republican politics. He chaired the New Jersey Republican State Committee from 1892 to 1904 and again from 1907 to 1910. He ran for Governor of New Jersey in 1901, and defeated his Democratic opponent James M. Seymour by a vote of 183,814 to 166,681. His 1902–1905 gubernatorial administration was a kind of Square Deal in miniature, as he implemented many Progressive policies, such as improved child labor laws, the abolition of the fee system that existed in state and county offices, and the establishment of New Jersey's first state primary laws. He was prohibited by the then-current provision of the New Jersey State Constitution from succeeding himself, so he yielded the Governorship at the end of his term to Edward C. Stokes.

From 1883 to 1886 he was a member of the Common Council of Newark and was at one time president of the Council. He was elected to the New Jersey General Assembly in 1885; while in office as parks commissioner he laid out and completed the parks of Essex County; from March 24, 1886 to 1889, he was a trustee for the Reform School for Boys. President McKinley appointed him one of the commissioners to the Paris Universal Exposition in 1900. He held official positions in numerous financial institutions, social, and civic bodies.

There is a life size statue of him in Weequahic Park in Newark.

== Post-gubernatorial life ==
After leaving office, he remained involved in New Jersey Republican Party affairs for the rest of his life. He was a delegate to the Republican National Convention five times, and at the 1908 Republican National Convention, he was a candidate for the vice presidential nomination to serve as running mate to William Howard Taft, that eventually went to New York Representative James S. Sherman.

He died in Palm Beach, Florida, at age 74 and was buried in Mount Pleasant Cemetery, Newark, in section F, lot 159/160.

== See also ==
- List of governors of New Jersey

Political offices
Preceded by Foster MacGowan Voorhees	Governor of New Jersey; January 21, 1902 – January 17, 1905	Succeeded by Edward C. Stokes
Party political offices
Preceded by Foster MacGowan Voorhees	Republican Nominee for Governor of New Jersey; 1901	Succeeded by Edward C. Stokes
Preceded by John Kean	Chairman of the New Jersey Republican State Committee; 1892–1904	Succeeded by Frank O. Briggs
Preceded by Frank O. Briggs	Chairman of the New Jersey Republican State Committee; 1907–1910	Succeeded by Frank O. Briggs
