= James Smith Jr. =

American politician

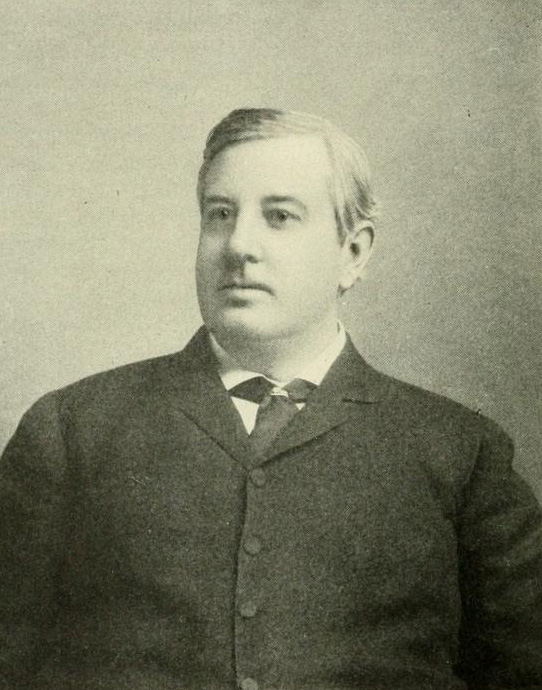

United States Senator from New Jersey
- In office March 4, 1893 – March 3, 1899
- Preceded by: Rufus Blodgett
- Succeeded by: John Kean

Personal details
- Born: June 12, 1851 Newark, New Jersey, U.S.
- Died: April 1, 1927 (aged 75) Newark, New Jersey, U.S.
- Party: Democratic

James Smith Jr. (June 12, 1851 – April 1, 1927) was a newspaper publisher and U.S. Senator from New Jersey. A leader of the Irish Catholic community, he was the Democratic party boss who sponsored Woodrow Wilson to the governorship in 1910.

== Biography ==
Born in Newark, New Jersey, Smith attended private schools and St. Mary's College, in Wilmington, Delaware. He was engaged in the dry-goods and importing business, and later became a manufacturer of leather in Newark. He owned two Newark newspapers, the Northern Star and the Evening Star (predecessors to The Star-Ledger), from 1895 to 1915.

He was a member of the Newark Common Council from 1883 to 1887. He declined the nomination for mayor of Newark in 1884. He also served as president of Newark's first works board.

Smith was elected as a Democrat to the United States Senate and served from March 4, 1893 to March 3, 1899, but did not seek re-election when his term ended. He had been the Chairman of the Committee on the Organization, Conduct and Expenditures of Executive Departments (in the Fifty-third United States Congress). After his political career, Smith returned to running his businesses, including banking, and raised his son. He served as receiver of the short-lived United States Shipbuilding Company following its collapse.

Smith was credited with giving Woodrow Wilson his political start. In 1910, he engineered the nomination of Wilson (then President of Princeton University) as Governor of New Jersey, the position Wilson held when elected President of the United States in 1912. However, Smith broke with Wilson in late 1910, when Wilson did not support Smith's Senate bid, but instead supported James Edgar Martine. Martine had won the Democratic preference primary, but Smith and his supporters refused to abide by the outcome of the primary, where few men voted. After failing to persuade Smith to withdraw, Wilson threw his support to Martine, who was in 1911 chosen by the New Jersey Legislature. Thereafter, The Star's newspaper editorials were consistently critical of Wilson.

In 1915, Smith's financial interests collapsed, and he became insolvent, leaving his creditors only six cents for each dollar of debt. He sold his newspapers that year, leaving Paul Block as their President.

He died in Newark, aged 75, and was interred in Holy Sepulchre Cemetery, East Orange. He was survived by four sons and two daughters.

U.S. Senate
| Preceded by Rufus Blodgett | U.S. senator (Class 1) from New Jersey; 1893–1899; Served alongside: John R. McPherson, William J. Sewell | Succeeded by John Kean |
