= James E. Martine =

American politician

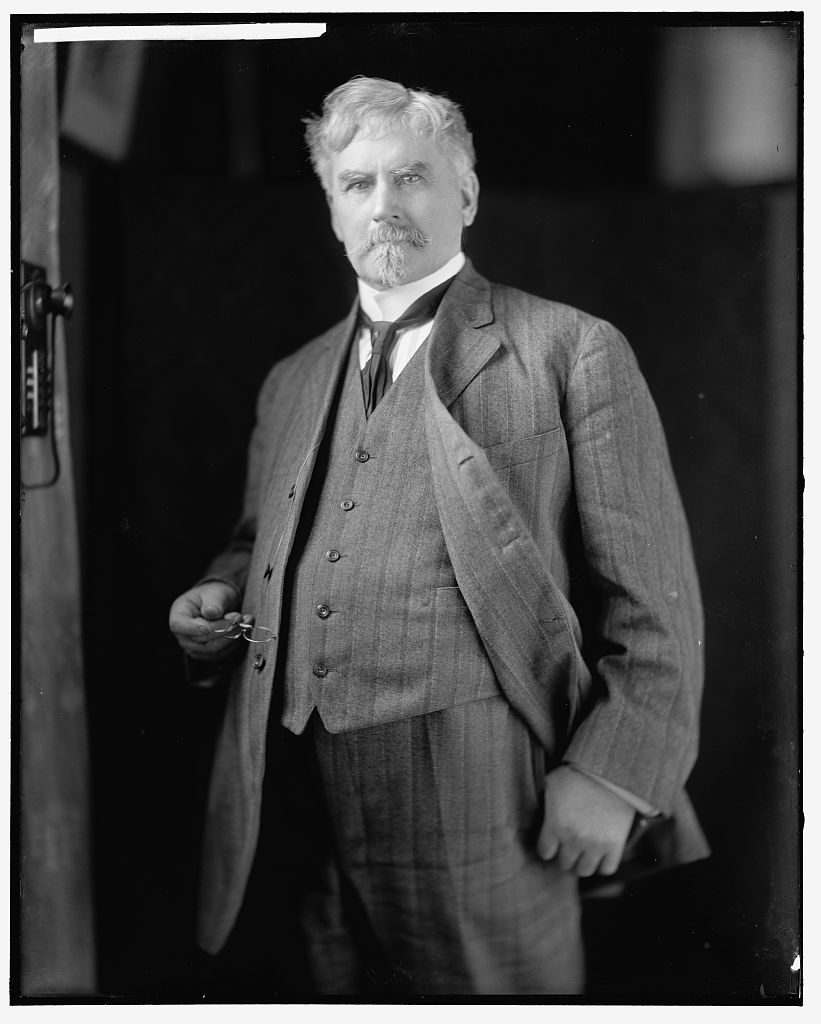
- Martine c. 1915

United States Senator from New Jersey
- In office March 4, 1911 – March 3, 1917
- Preceded by: John Kean
- Succeeded by: Joseph S. Frelinghuysen, Sr.

Personal details
- Born: August 25, 1850 New York City, New York, U.S.
- Died: February 26, 1925 (aged 74) Miami, Florida, U.S.
- Party: Democratic
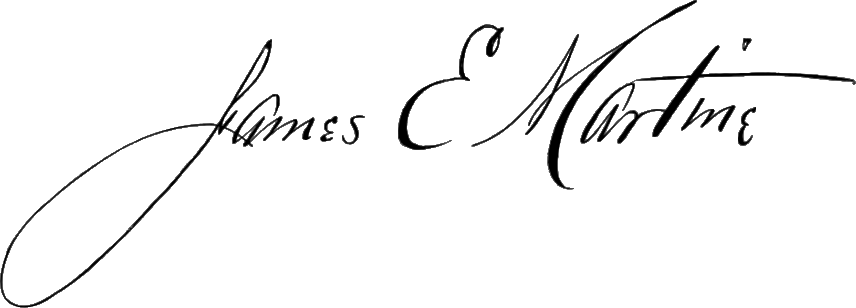
- Signature

James Edgar Martine (August 25, 1850 – February 26, 1925) was an American Democratic Party politician who represented New Jersey in the United States Senate from 1911 to 1917.

== Early life ==
James Edgar Martine was born in New York City on August 25, 1850. His parents were Daniel W. Martine and Anna Neher Martine, who were of German and English descent. In 1863, Daniel Martine died, leaving James in charge of their large ancestral family farm in Plainfield, New Jersey. In addition to managing the farm, James began a successful real estate practice, selling off portions of the farm to be developed as the city of Plainfield expanded and urbanized.

Martine was elected to the Plainfield common council but was otherwise a frequent and unsuccessful candidate for higher office. He ran unsuccessfully for United States Representative, Governor (three times), State Senator (four times), and State Assembly (twice), as well as for local and county offices including mayor.

== United States Senate ==
In 1910, Martine ran in the first-ever popular primary for United States Senator. The primary was non-binding, and the presumptive Democratic candidate, former Senator James Smith Jr., did not register as a candidate. When Martine won the most votes and the Democratic Party later won control of the state legislature, the nomination was contested between Martine and Smith as a proxy for whether the primary represented the choice of the people and should be obeyed by the legislators. Ultimately, Martine prevailed with the support of Governor-elected Woodrow Wilson.

In the Senate, Martine served as chairman of the Committee on Coast Defenses (Sixty-third United States Congress), Committee on Industrial Expositions (Sixty-third and Sixty-fourth United States Congresses).

During the 1913 Senate Committee investigation into the West Virginia miners strike, Senator Martine aggressively confronted Kanawha County coal company executive Quinn Morton for arming and directing the use of the armored "Bull Moose" train against a Holly Grove tent village of miners and their families in the middle of the night on February 2, 1913, during which Charles Estep, young miner with a young child and a pregnant wife, was killed. The train contained dozens of private mercenaries armed with a Gatling gun. Martine confronted Morton over his refusal to acknowledge giving the command to fire and then reportedly asking the sheriff to back the train up and do it again. The two other senators on the committee attempted to censor Martine by requiring that his questions be submitted for prior review. According to historian David Alan Corbin's 1990 book The West Virginia Mine Wars, the Congressional Record of this hearing "breaks off suddenly, the topic switches, and Senator Martine disappears from the panel of inquisitors."

Despite the fact that his election was the result of Wilson's support as Governor, Martine became a critic and opponent of Wilson following his election as President of the United States. Martine was critical of American participation in World War I and of Wilson's proposal for a League of Nations. In the 1916 primary, Martine was challenged by John W. Wescott, a Wilson ally and Attorney General of New Jersey. Martine survived the challenge but was defeated by a wide margin in the general election by Joseph S. Frelinghuysen.

Martine died on February 26, 1925, in Miami, Florida, of apoplexy. He was interred at Hillside Cemetery in Scotch Plains, New Jersey.

Party political offices
First	Democratic nominee for Senator from New Jersey (Class 1); 1916	Succeeded by Edward I. Edwards
U.S. Senate
Preceded by John Kean	U.S. Senator (Class 1) from New Jersey; 1911–1917	Succeeded by Joseph S. Frelinghuysen
