= Edward C. Stokes =

American politician (1860–1942)

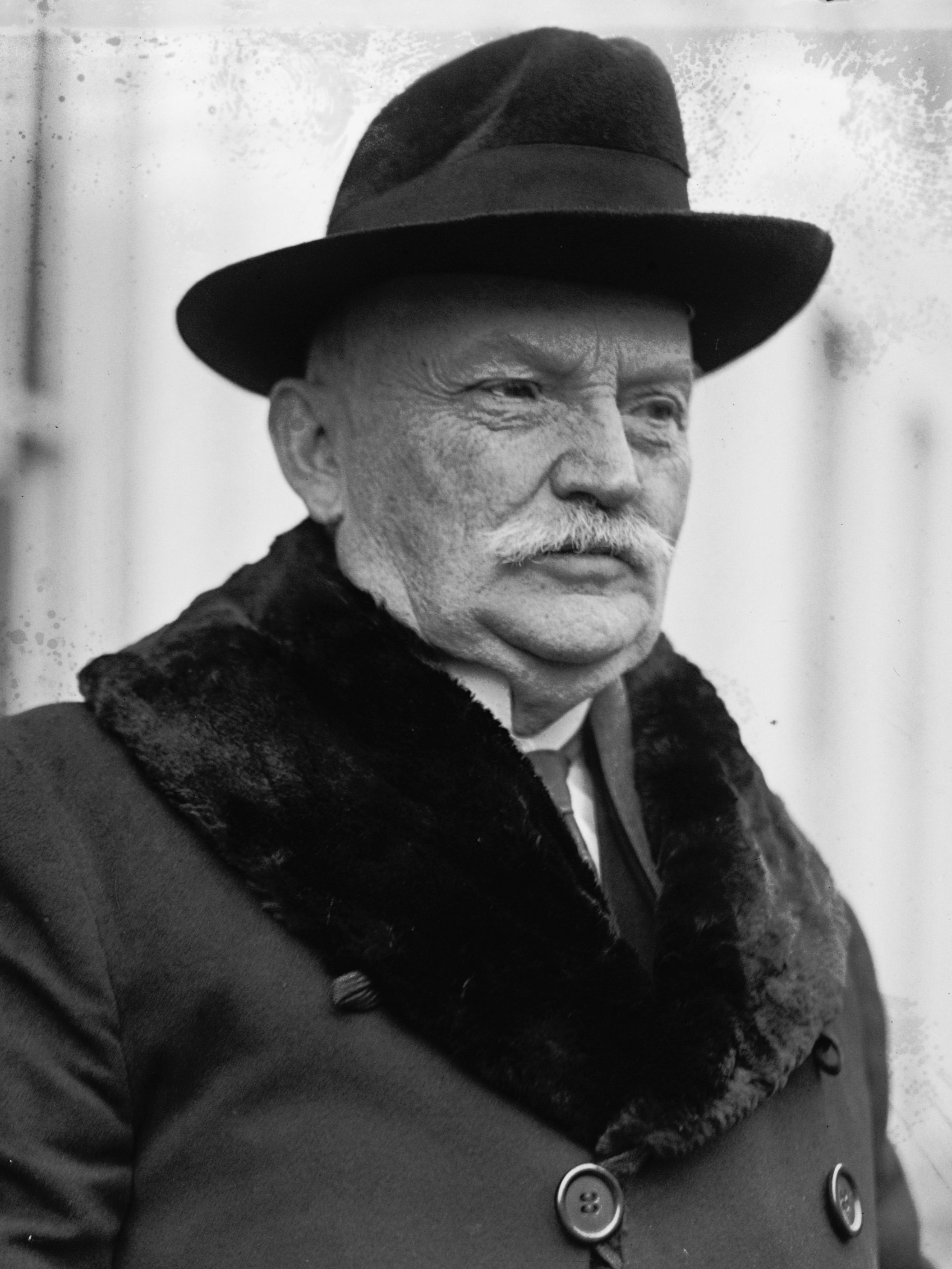
- Stokes in 1923

32nd Governor of New Jersey
- In office January 17, 1905 – January 21, 1908
- Preceded by: Franklin Murphy
- Succeeded by: John Franklin Fort

Member of the New Jersey Senate from Cumberland County
- In office 1893–1903
- Preceded by: Seaman R. Fowler
- Succeeded by: Bloomfield Minch

Member of the New Jersey General Assembly
- In office 1891

Personal details
- Born: Edward Casper Stokes; December 22, 1860 Philadelphia, Pennsylvania, U.S.
- Died: November 4, 1942 (aged 81) Trenton, New Jersey, U.S.
- Party: Republican

Edward Casper Stokes (December 22, 1860 – November 4, 1942) was an American Republican Party politician, who served as the 32nd governor of New Jersey, from 1905 to 1908.

== Biography ==
Stokes was born in Philadelphia, Pennsylvania in 1860. He attended the Friends School in Rhode Island, and graduated from Brown University in 1883.

Stokes was elected to the New Jersey General Assembly in 1891, and was a member of the New Jersey Senate from Cumberland County between 1893 and 1901. He was the Governor between 1905 and 1908.

Stokes made his first attempt at the United States Senate in 1902 after the death of William Joyce Sewell, but fell short in voting by the Republican caucus, losing out to John F. Dryden.

Stokes won a narrow victory in the 1910 Republican primary for United States Senate, but two years before the direct election of Senators, Democrats controlled the legislature and Stokes was defeated. He was the Republican nominee for governor in 1913, but lost to James F. Fielder. From 1919 to 1927, he was the Chairman of the New Jersey Republican State Committee. Stokes ran for the U.S. Senate in 1928, but finished second in the Republican primary behind Hamilton Fish Kean. He chaired the state's GOP general election campaign that year.

Stokes was the President of Mechanics National Bank in Trenton and was President of the New Jersey Bankers Association. He lost much of his own money in the stock market crash, and in 1939 the New Jersey Legislature voted to give him a $2,500-a-year pension. Stokes turned the money down and instead took a state job advising New Jersey's public information office.

Stokes died November 4, 1942, aged 81. He is buried in Mount Pleasant Cemetery in Millville, New Jersey.

== See also ==
- List of governors of New Jersey

Political offices
Preceded by Maurice A. Rogers	President of the New Jersey Senate; 1895	Succeeded by Lewis A. Thompson
Preceded by Franklin Murphy	Governor of New Jersey; January 17, 1905 – January 21, 1908	Succeeded by John Franklin Fort
Party political offices
Preceded by Franklin Murphy	Republican Nominee for Governor of New Jersey; 1904	Succeeded by John Franklin Fort
Preceded by Vivian M. Lewis	Republican Nominee for Governor of New Jersey; 1913	Succeeded by Walter Evans Edge
Preceded by Newton A.K. Bugbee	Chairman of the New Jersey Republican State Committee; 1919–1927	Succeeded by E. Bertram Mott
