= 1913 United States gubernatorial elections =

| ← 1912 | November 4, 1913; July 23, 1913 (AR) | 1914 → |

4 governorships (Note: Including a special election in Arkansas.)
| | Majority party | Minority party |
|---|---|---|
| Party | Democratic | Republican |
| Seats before | 30 | 16 |
| Seats after | 30 | 16 |
| Seat change | Steady | Steady |
| Seats up | 4 | 0 |
| Seats won | 4 | 0 |
- Democratic hold

United States gubernatorial elections were held in 1913, in four states. Massachusetts at this time held gubernatorial elections every year. It would abandon this practice in 1920. New Jersey at this time held gubernatorial elections every 3 years. It would abandon this practice in 1949. Virginia holds its gubernatorial elections in odd numbered years, every 4 years, following the United States presidential election year.

In Arkansas, a special election was held in July 1913 following the resignation of Joseph T. Robinson in March 1913 to take a seat in the United States Senate.

== Results ==
| State | Incumbent | Party | Status | Opposing candidates |
|---|---|---|---|---|
| Arkansas (special election, held 23 July 1913) | Junius Marion Futrell (acting) | Democratic | Did not contest, Democratic victory | George W. Hays (Democratic) 64.25% Harry H. Myers (Republican) 20.41% George W. Murphy (Progressive) 10.10% J. Emil Webber (Socialist) 5.24% |
| Massachusetts | Eugene Foss | Democratic | Did not contest Democratic renomination, ran as an independent, defeated | David I. Walsh (Democratic) 39.77% Charles S. Bird (Progressive) 27.72% Augustus P. Gardner (Republican) 25.32% Eugene Foss (Independent) 4.38% George H. Wrenn (Socialist) 1.96% Alfred H. Evans (Prohibition) 0.44% Arthur Elmer Reimer (Socialist Labor) 0.42% |
| New Jersey | Leon R. Taylor (acting) (Note: James F. Fielder became governor when Woodrow Wilson resigned to be President of the United States. As president of the senate, Fielder acted as governor until he resigned from the senate. The constitution prohibited governors from succeeding themselves, so he resigned to run, winning the race. This left Taylor, as speaker of the house of representatives, acting as governor for the remainder of the term.) | Democratic | Did not contest, Democratic victory | James F. Fielder (Democratic) 46.13% Edward C. Stokes (Republican) 37.38% Everett Colby (Progressive) 10.96% James M. Reilly (Socialist) 3.72% James G. Mason (Prohibition) 0.91% John C. Butterworth (Socialist Labor) 0.66% Daniel F. Dwyer (Independent) 0.23% |
| Virginia | William Hodges Mann | Democratic | Term-limited, Democratic victory | Henry Carter Stuart (Democratic) 91.87% C. Campbell (Socialist) 5.23% B. D. Downey (Socialist Labor) 2.90% Democratic primary results Henry Carter Stuart, unopposed or "without serious opposition" [data missing] |
