= 1916 New Jersey gubernatorial election =

- November 7, 1916
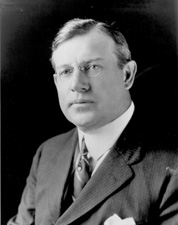

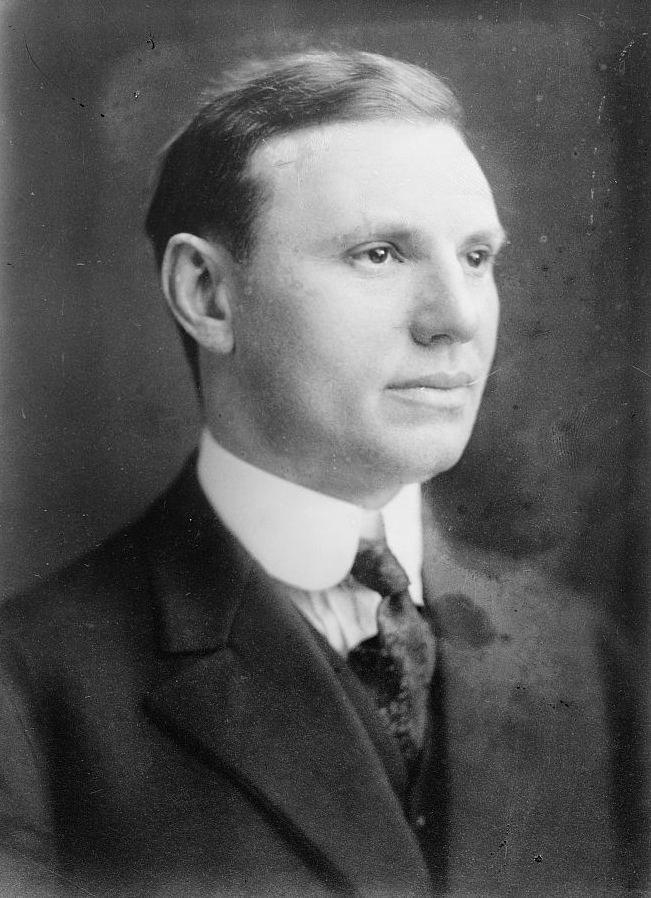
Nominee	Walter Evans Edge	H. Otto Wittpenn
Party	Republican	Democratic
Popular vote	247,343	177,696
Percentage	55.44%	39.83%
- County results Edge: 40–50% 50–60% 60–70% Wittpenn: 50–60%
Governor before election
James Fairman Fielder
Democratic
Elected Governor
Walter Evans Edge
Republican

The 1916 New Jersey gubernatorial election was held on November 7, 1916. Republican nominee Walter Evans Edge defeated Democratic nominee H. Otto Wittpenn with 55.44 percent of the total vote.

== Democratic primary ==
=== Candidates ===
- H. Otto Wittpenn, former mayor of Jersey City

=== Results ===
Wittpenn, who had run for Governor in 1913 but withdrew in favor of James Fairman Fielder, was unopposed for the Democratic nomination.

1916 Democratic gubernatorial primary
Party	Candidate	Votes	%
Democratic	H. Otto Wittpenn	95,607	100.00%
Total votes		95,607	100.00%
None	Blank votes	23,906	—
Turnout		119,513	100.00%

== Republican primary ==
=== Candidates ===
- Austen Colgate, former state senator for Essex County
- Walter Evans Edge, state senator for Atlantic County
- George L. Record, attorney and perennial candidate from Jersey City

=== Campaign ===
During the primary, Edge was the beneficiary of a gentleman's agreement between Atlantic County Republican boss Enoch L. Johnson and Hudson County Democratic boss Frank Hague, who feared the election of Otto Wittpenn, a reformer and Hague's political rival. Historians disagree over the contours of Johnson and Hague's arrangement, but in 1916, Hague directed his supporters in Hudson County to cross over and vote for Edge in the Republican primary.

=== Results ===
Edge carried the state narrowly over Colgate, with Atlantic County accounting for more than his statewide margin. More than one-quarter of Colgate's vote came from his native Essex County.

1916 Republican gubernatorial primary
Party	Candidate	Votes	%
Republican	Walter Evans Edge	76,232	42.94%
Republican	Austen Colgate	72,621	40.90%
Republican	George L. Record	28,686	16.16%
Total votes		177,539	100.00%
None	Blank votes	9,875	—
Turnout		187,414	100.00%

==== By county ====
County	Edge %	Edge votes	Colgate %	Colgate votes	Record %	Record votes
Atlantic	76.01%	7,329	19.19%	1,850	4.80%	463
Bergen	32.12%	3,897	47.69%	5,787	20.19%	2,450
Burlington	48.75%	3,715	41.27%	3,145	9.99%	761
Camden	51.48%	8,839	29.50%	5,066	19.02%	3,266
Cape May	76.18%	2,251	15.63%	462	8.19%	242
Cumberland	49.62%	2,099	31.63%	1,338	18.75%	793
Essex	29.31%	10,117	58.53%	20,199	12.16%	4,196
Gloucester	70.01%	2,486	14.90%	529	15.09%	536
Hudson	34.00%	5,138	54.69%	8,264	11.32%	1,710
Hunterdon	64.89%	972	12.88%	193	22.23%	333
Mercer	39.77%	4,152	28.16%	2,940	32.07%	3,348
Middlesex	35.41%	1,849	47.84%	2,498	16.76%	875
Monmouth	37.99%	2,481	45.46%	2,969	16.55%	1,081
Morris	43.91%	3,153	36.11%	2,593	19.97%	1,434
Ocean	49.49%	1,419	38.58%	1,106	11.93%	342
Passaic	42.68%	7,818	36.95%	6,768	20.37%	3,731
Salem	71.89%	1,051	13.47%	197	14.64%	214
Somerset	44.54%	1,545	34.53%	1,198	20.93%	726
Sussex	45.51%	598	36.38%	478	18.11%	238
Union	43.66%	4,689	42.72%	4,589	13.62%	1,463
Warren	40.38%	634	28.79%	452	30.83%	484

== General election ==
=== Candidates ===
- John C. Butterworth (Socialist Labor)
- Walter Evans Edge, state senator for Atlantic County (Republican)
- Frederick Krafft, business manager of the New Yorker Volkszeitung (Socialist)
- Harry Vaughan (Prohibition)
- H. Otto Wittpenn, former mayor of Jersey City (Democratic)

=== Campaign ===
In the general election, Frank Hague is believed to have discouraged fellow Democrats from voting for Wittpenn.

=== Results ===
New Jersey gubernatorial election, 1916
Party	Candidate	Votes	%	±%
Republican	Walter Evans Edge	247,343	55.44%	▲18.06
Democratic	H. Otto Wittpenn	177,696	39.83%	▼6.30
Socialist	Frederick Krafft	12,900	2.89%	▼0.83
Prohibition	Harry Vaughan	5,873	1.32%	▲0.41
Socialist Labor	John C. Butterworth	2,334	0.52%	▼0.14
Total votes		446,146		
Turnout				
Republican gain from Democratic		Swing		
