= 1913 New Jersey gubernatorial election =

- November 4, 1913
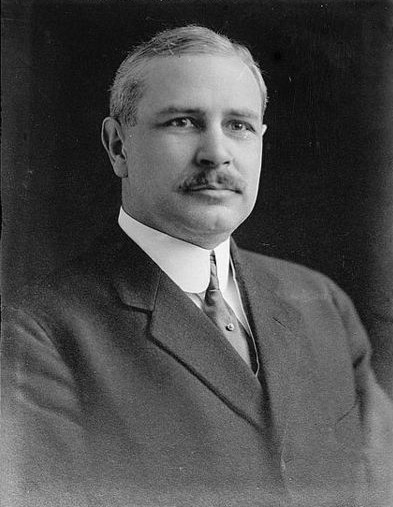

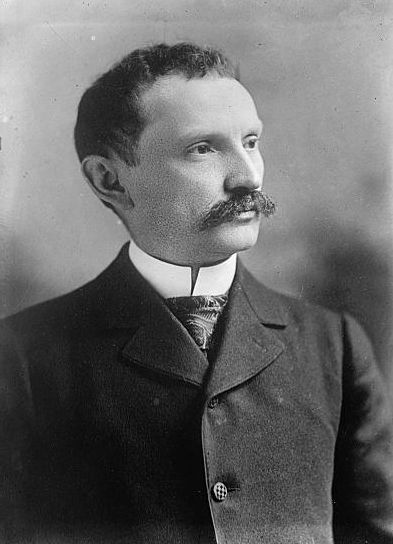

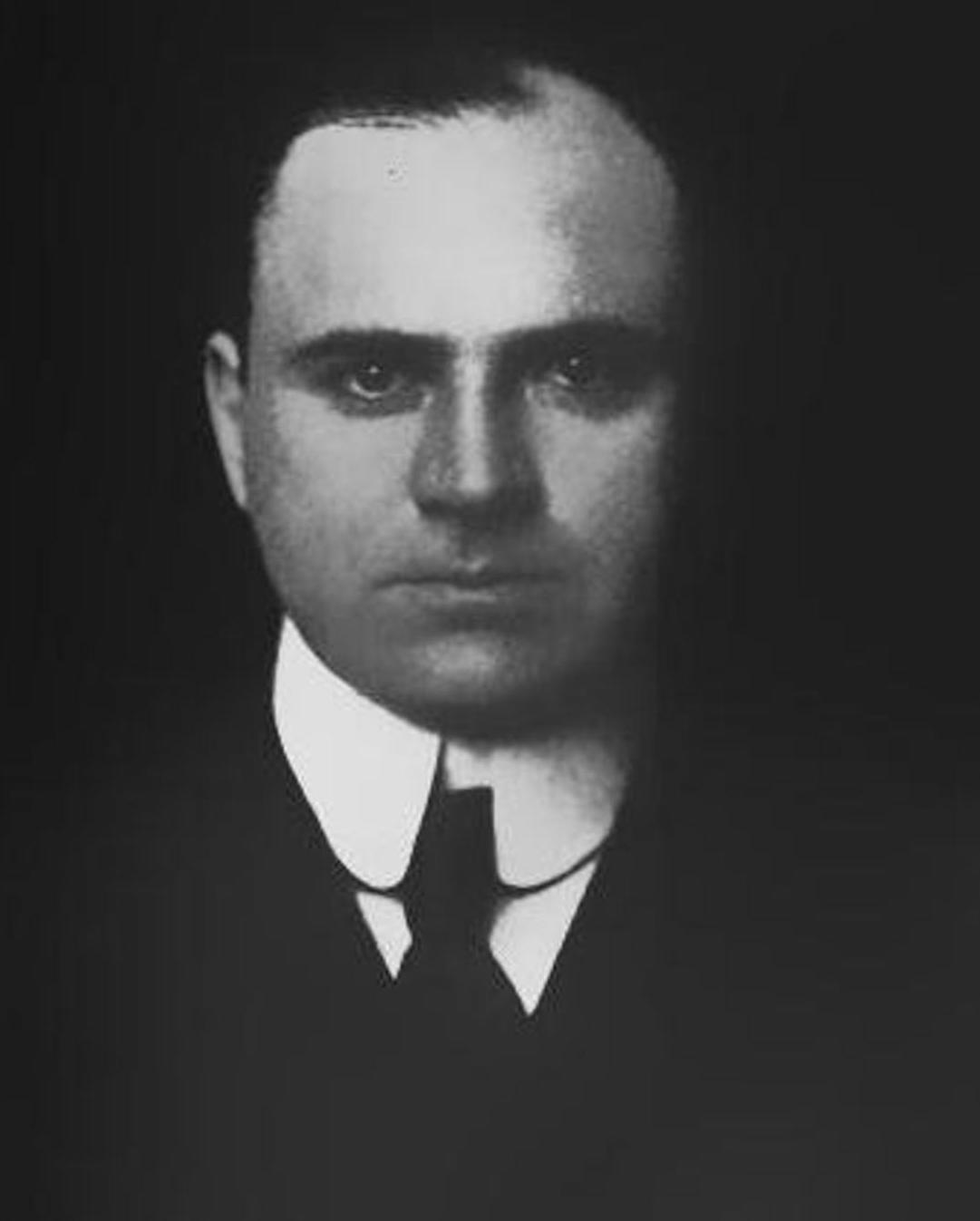
Nominee	James Fairman Fielder	Edward C. Stokes	Everett Colby
Party	Democratic	Republican	Progressive
Popular vote	173,148	140,298	41,132
Percentage	46.13%	37.38%	10.96%
- County results Fielder: 30–40% 40–50% 50–60% 60–70% Stokes: 30–40% 40–50% 50–60% 60–70%
Governor before election
Leon Rutherford Taylor (acting)
Democratic
Elected Governor
James Fairman Fielder
Democratic

The 1913 New Jersey gubernatorial election was held on November 4, 1913. Democratic acting Governor James Fairman Fielder, who resigned a week before the election so that he could succeed himself, defeated Republican former Governor Edward C. Stokes and Progressive former state senator Everett Colby.

The state's first-ever direct primary elections for governor were held on September 23, though the contests were largely uneventful. For the Democratic nomination, Fielder defeated former Trenton mayor Frank S. Katzenbach, making his third run for governor. Stokes easily topped a four-man field in the Republican Party, including former U.S. Representative Charles N. Fowler, whom he had defeated in the 1910 primary for U.S. Senate. The Progressive primary was closest, with Colby defeating Montclair industrialist Edmund Burke Osborne by 29 percent of the vote.

== Democratic primary ==
=== Candidates ===
- James Fairman Fielder, State Senator for Hudson County, President of the New Jersey Senate, and acting Governor
- Frank S. Katzenbach, former mayor of Trenton and candidate for governor in 1907 and 1910

==== Withdrew ====
- H. Otto Wittpenn, mayor of Jersey City

=== Campaign ===
The Democratic nomination was hotly contested between two progressive candidates from Hudson County, acting Governor James Fairman Fielder and H. Otto Wittpenn, the mayor of Jersey City. Fielder prevailed by securing the endorsement of President (and former Governor) Woodrow Wilson on July 23, when President Wilson called on Wittpenn to unite the party behind Fielder, who had "backed [Wilson] so consistently, so intelligently, so frankly and honestly throughout my administration ... that I feel I would have no ground whatever upon which to oppose his candidacy." Wittpenn acquiesced and withdrew from the race.

Fielder, who thus had the support of Wilson and the party machine, easily defeated third-time candidate Frank S. Katzenbach in the September 23 primary.

=== Results ===
1913 Democratic gubernatorial primary
Party	Candidate	Votes	%
Democratic	James Fairman Fielder (incumbent)	80,414	69.61%
Democratic	Frank S. Katzenbach	35,115	30.39%
Total votes		115,529	100.00%

== Republican primary ==
=== Candidates ===
- Robert Carey, former Jersey City judge
- Charles N. Fowler, former U.S. Representative from Elizabeth and candidate for U.S. Senate in 1910
- Carlton B. Pierce, state senator from Union County
- Edward C. Stokes, former governor of New Jersey and candidate for U.S. Senate in 1910

=== Campaign ===
Former U.S. Representative Charles N. Fowler ran on a progressive platform favoring a convention to redraw the state constitution and various electoral reforms, including the recall of all officers except judges, initiative, referendum, and making failure to vote in a primary a bar to voting in the general election.

=== Results ===
1913 Republican gubernatorial primary
Party	Candidate	Votes	%
Republican	Edward C. Stokes	60,644	70.05%
Republican	Charles N. Fowler	10,571	12.21%
Republican	Robert Carey	10,336	11.92%
Republican	Carlton B. Pierce	5,022	5.80%
Total votes		86,573	100.00%

== Progressive primary ==
=== Candidates ===
- Everett Colby, former state senator from Essex County
- Edmund Burke Osborne, Montclair art calendar industrialist

=== Campaign ===
On July 26, both candidates spoke in Ocean Grove at a mass meeting of the New Jersey Men's League for Women's Suffrage, along with George La Monte, Lillian Feickert, and Mina Van Winkle.

Osborne originally requested that Colby tour the state with him, since both candidates were from Essex County, but Colby declined before acquiescing to a debate in Montclair on September 11. The debate was moved to Newark's Kreuger Auditorium at Osborne's request to accommodate a larger audience.

=== Results ===
1913 Progressive gubernatorial primary
Party	Candidate	Votes	%
Progressive	Everett Colby	6,458	63.91%
Progressive	Edmund Burke Osborne	3,647	36.09%
Total votes		10,105	100.00%

== General election ==
=== Candidates ===
- John C. Butterworth (Socialist Labor)
- Everett Colby, former state senator for Essex County (Progressive)
- Daniel F. Dwyer (Independent)
- James Fairman Fielder, state senator for Middlesex County, president of the New Jersey Senate, and acting governor (Democratic)
- James G. Mason (Prohibition)
- Edward C. Stokes, former governor of New Jersey (Republican)
- James M. Reilly (Socialist)

=== Results ===
1913 New Jersey gubernatorial election
Party	Candidate	Votes	%	±%
Democratic	James Fairman Fielder	173,148	46.13%	▼7.80
Republican	Edward C. Stokes	140,298	37.38%	▼5.23
Progressive	Everett Colby	41,132	10.96%	N/A
Socialist	James M. Reilly	13,977	3.72%	▲1.38
Prohibition	James G. Mason	3,427	0.91%	▲0.26
Socialist Labor	John C. Butterworth	2,460	0.66%	▲0.19
Independent	Daniel F. Dwyer	875	0.23%	N/A
Total votes		375,317		
Turnout				
Democratic hold		Swing		
