= Walter E. Edge =

American diplomat and politician (1873–1956)

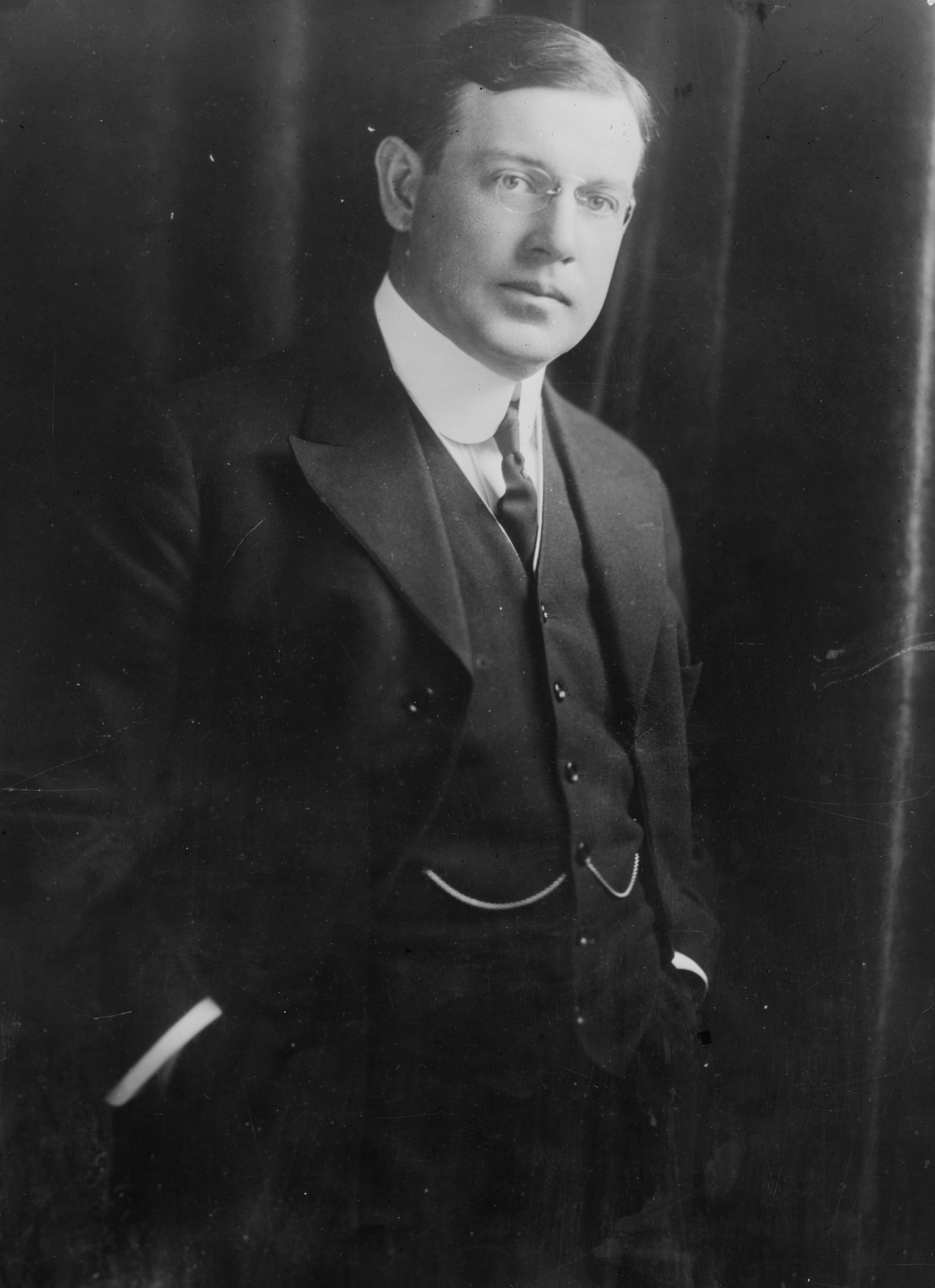
- Edge c. 1915

36th Governor of New Jersey
- In office January 18, 1944 – January 21, 1947
- Preceded by: Charles Edison
- Succeeded by: Alfred E. Driscoll
- In office January 15, 1917 – May 16, 1919
- Preceded by: James Fairman Fielder
- Succeeded by: William Nelson Runyon (acting)

United States Ambassador to France
- In office November 21, 1929 – March 4, 1933
- President: Herbert Hoover
- Preceded by: Myron T. Herrick
- Succeeded by: Jesse I. Straus

United States Senator from New Jersey
- In office May 19, 1919 – November 21, 1929
- Preceded by: David Baird Sr.
- Succeeded by: David Baird Jr.
Senate positions
10th Chair of the Senate Committee on Interoceanic Canals
In office 1922–1930
Preceded by	William E. Borah
Succeeded by	Thomas D. Schall
8th Chair of the Senate Committee on Coast and Insular Survey
In office 1919–1921
Preceded by	Edward J. Gay
Succeeded by	Committee terminated

57th President of the New Jersey Senate
- In office 1915
- Preceded by: John W. Slocum
- Succeeded by: William T. Read

Member of the New Jersey Senate from Atlantic County
- In office 1910–1916
- Preceded by: Edward A. Wilson
- Succeeded by: Emerson Lewis Richards

Member of the New Jersey General Assembly
- In office 1909
- Preceded by: Martin E. Keffer
- Succeeded by: Isaac Bacharach

Personal details
- Born: November 20, 1873 Philadelphia, Pennsylvania, U.S.
- Died: October 29, 1956 (aged 82) New York City, New York, U.S.
- Resting place: Northwood Cemetery, Downingtown, Pennsylvania, U.S.
- Party: Republican
- Spouse(s): Lady Lee Phillips; Camilla Loyal Ashe Sewall

Military service
- Allegiance: United States
- Branch/service: United States Army
- Years of service: 1898
- Rank: Second Lieutenant
- Battles/wars: Spanish-American War

Walter Evans Edge (November 20, 1873 – October 29, 1956) was an American diplomat and Republican politician who served as the 36th governor of New Jersey, from 1917 to 1919 and again from 1944 to 1947, during both World War I and World War II. Edge also served as United States Senator representing New Jersey from 1919 to 1929 and as United States Ambassador to France from 1929 to 1933.

== Early life ==
Edge was born in Philadelphia, Pennsylvania, on November 20, 1873. His father, William Edge, worked for the Pennsylvania Railroad. His mother Mary (Evans) Edge, died when he was two years old. At the age of four Edge moved to Pleasantville, New Jersey, where the family of his stepmother, Wilhelmina (Scull) Edge, operated a small hotel. His formal education went only as far as the eighth grade in a two-room public school in Pleasantville.

As a youth, Edge demonstrated a desire to succeed in business and he acquired an interest in politics. At the age of ten, he and another boy started a four-page weekly newspaper devoted to social news, the Pleasantville Bladder, which had a circulation of approximately one hundred. Edge also attended Pleasantville Republican party rallies and later recounted that he came away from these events feeling great excitement and a growing determination to someday participate in politics himself.

== Business career ==
In 1888, at the age of fourteen, Edge began working for the Atlantic Review, then Atlantic City's only newspaper, providing it with news and social notes pertaining to Pleasantville and nearby communities. Later in 1888, Edge took another job with the newspaper, serving primarily as a printer's devil and performing a wide variety of other jobs as well. Edge's position at the Atlantic Review introduced him to many of the hotel owners and businessmen in rapidly growing Atlantic City. Edge moved from Pleasantville to Atlantic City the same year.

At the age of sixteen, Edge took a part-time job with John M. Dorland, who operated an Atlantic City advertising business. Dorland solicited advertising from Atlantic City hotels for Philadelphia and New York newspapers. Dorland was in poor health when Edge joined him and within a few months, Edge was running the business. When Dorland died less than one year later, his widow sold the business to Edge, who was then seventeen years old, for $500. Edge financed the purchase with a note that a hotel owner agreed to co-sign for him. Under Edge's management, the Dorland Agency grew into multimillion-dollar advertising agency, with offices in numerous cities in the United States and Europe.

In 1893 Edge founded the Atlantic City Guest, a summer newspaper devoted to the activities of the resort's vacationers. The success of the paper led Edge to start a similar paper in Jacksonville, Florida, during the winter of 1894–1895. On March 4, 1895, Edge established the Atlantic City Daily Press (now the Press of Atlantic City) as the successor to the Atlantic City Guest, which eventually became the Atlantic City area's dominant newspaper. Edge's income from the Press soon exceeded $20,000 annually. In 1905, Edge purchased the competing Evening Union, also based in Atlantic City. He sold both newspapers in 1919 to three employees: Albert J. Feyl, Paul J. O'Neill, and Francis E. Croasdale.

== Political career ==
=== Early political career ===
Edge's successful advertising and publishing businesses made him very wealthy. From the beginning, his ultimate goal was to use his success in business to build a political career and to devote his primary attention to politics after he had attained financial security.

In 1894, Edge was elected to the executive committee of the Atlantic City Republican Party. From 1897 until 1899 he served as journal clerk of the New Jersey Senate, a position that enabled him to meet state political figures and learn parliamentary procedures. In the 1890s Edge was a sergeant with the Morris Guards, a private military organization based in Atlantic City, and when the Spanish–American War began in 1898, he volunteered the company for service in the United States Army. He was commissioned as a second lieutenant in the Army during the war and served for a few months, but did not leave the United States. Between 1901 and 1904, Edge was appointed secretary of the state senate, another position that enabled him to cultivate relationships with state legislators.

Edge was a presidential elector in 1904.

In 1904, Edge ran as a reformer in the Republican primary for the Atlantic County state senate seat occupied by incumbent Edward S. Lee. Edge used his Atlantic City Daily Press to promote his candidacy against Lee, who was supported by the established local Republican machine. Edge lost to Lee.

After his defeat, Edge's Daily Press became a faithful supporter of the local Republican organization, and in 1909 he was elected to the New Jersey General Assembly. In 1910, Edge was elected to the New Jersey Senate where he served for two terms, becoming the senate president in 1915.

Although Edge served in the state legislature during the height of the Progressive Era, he tended to take moderate positions and was not considered a reformer. He supported the Republican leadership, although he did cooperate with reformers when their efforts appeared sure of success. Early in his legislative career, Edge worked extensively in developing a workers' compensation law for New Jersey, even traveling to Europe to study compensation systems there. The workers' compensation bill that he sponsored was passed by the legislature and signed into law by Governor Woodrow Wilson. He also promoted legislation calling for a ten-hour day for women workers and safety laws protecting factory workers. He gained a reputation for concern with economic matters and the efficiency of state government.

=== Governor of New Jersey, 1917–1919 ===
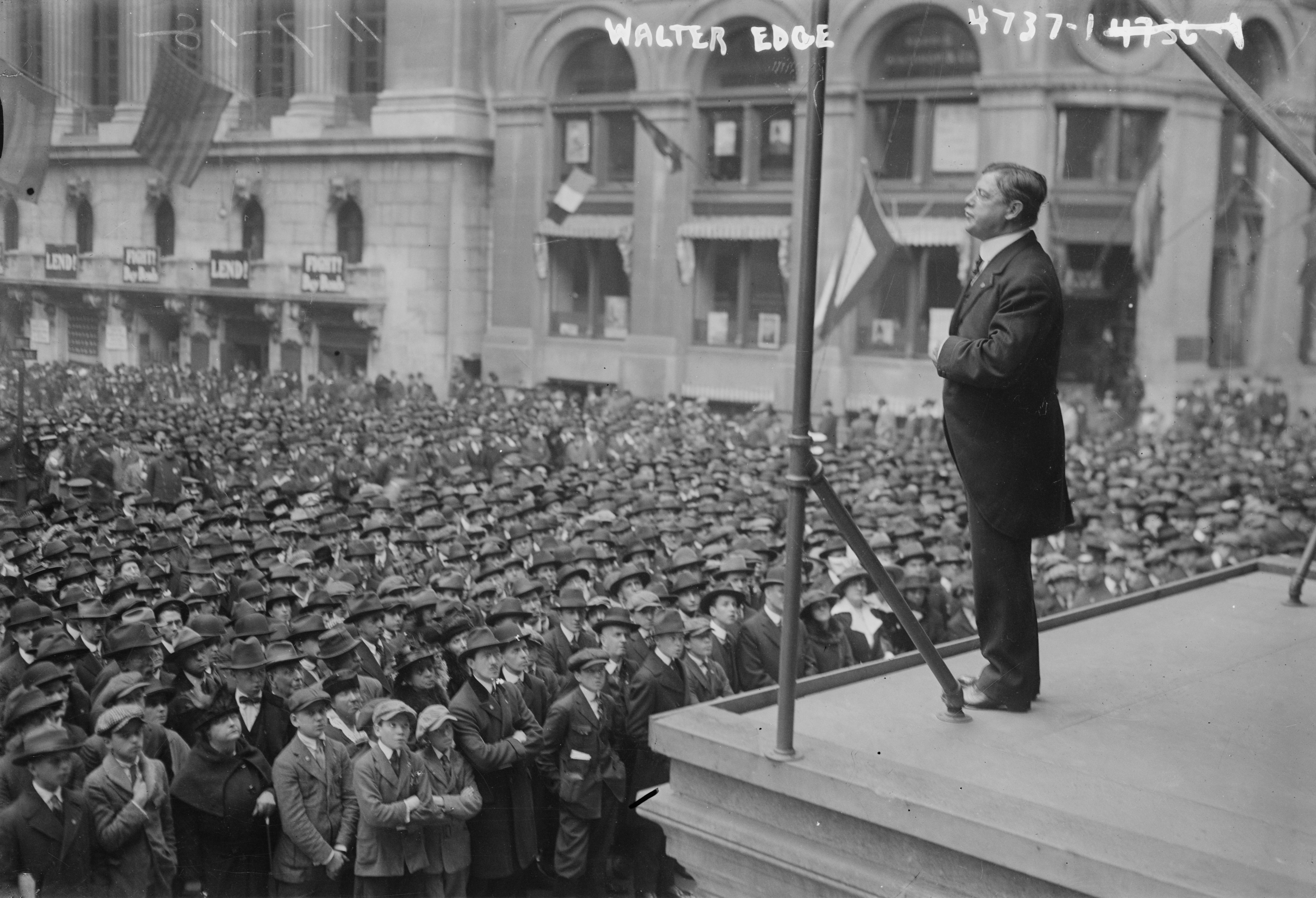
Edge addressing a large crowd during World War I. Liberty bond banners adorn a nearby building.

In early 1916 Edge announced his candidacy for governor. Edge's opponent for the Republican nomination was Austen Colgate. Edge's campaign manager, Enoch "Nucky" Johnson, the boss of the Atlantic County Republican machine, and Frank Hague, boss of the Hudson County Democratic machine, are widely credited with securing Edge's election as governor. Johnson reached out to Hague, who feared the Democratic candidate, H. Otto Wittpenn, a reformer whose election would threaten Hague's control of Hudson County. It is unclear whether Edge and Hague reached some agreement in exchange for Hague's assistance, with one authority concluding there was "[p]robably no outright deal", another stating Edge provided Hague with "a pledge of cooperation", and a third stating that Edge "had a working arrangement with Hague; the former to be left alone in South Jersey and Hague to be 'protected' in Hudson". In any event, Hague instructed those in his Democratic organization to crossover and vote for Edge in the Republican primary, thereby securing Edge a narrow victory. Thereafter, Hague did not support Wittpenn in the general election, and Edge was elected on a platform of making government more effective and efficient with the slogan "A Business Man with a Business Plan".

As governor, Edge obtained legislation consolidating state boards, improving the civil service, imposing a franchise tax on public utilities, allowing greater home rule for cities, reforming corporation law, and improving state institutions, especially the prisons. In 1917 the legislature also agreed to Edge's proposal to reorganize the state road department, and Edge won approval for legislation authorizing the construction of a bridge between southern New Jersey and Philadelphia and a tunnel between northern New Jersey and New York City. The bridge had been sought for some time by South Jersey legislators, but had failed to gain the support of North Jersey legislators, who opposed spending state funds on a project that they felt would benefit only the southern part of the state. Edge therefore combined the bridge proposal with plans for a tunnel to New York to win statewide support. The bridge, the Benjamin Franklin Bridge, which spans the Delaware River between Camden and Philadelphia, opened in 1926, and the tunnel, the Holland Tunnel, which connects Jersey City and lower Manhattan, opened in 1927. It has been contended that the decision to place the terminus of the tunnel in Jersey City was the result of Frank Hague's support of Edge in the 1916 gubernatorial election.

A considerable part of Edge's efforts as governor involved the mobilization for World War I and postwar planning.

=== United States Senator, 1919–1929 ===
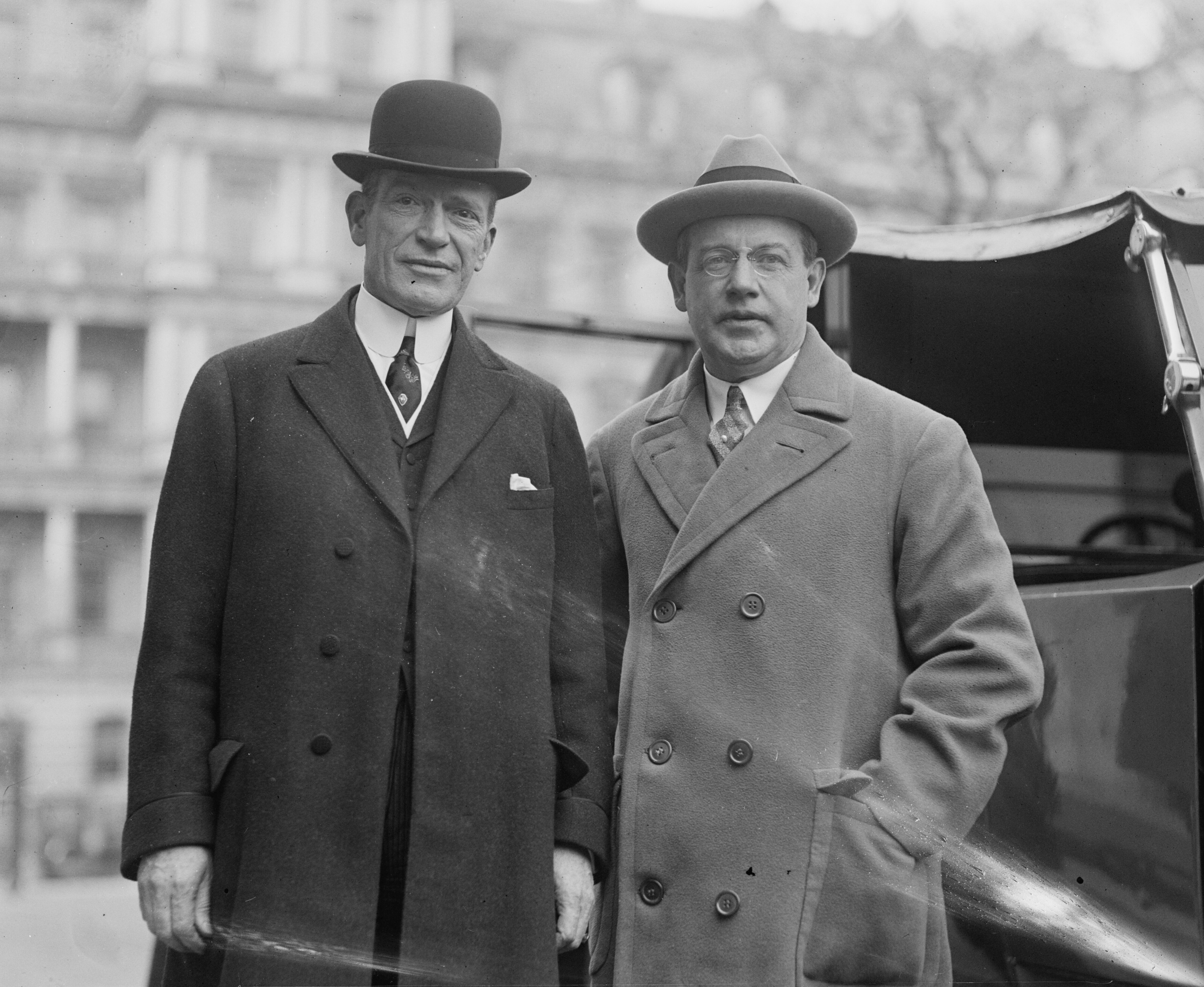
Edge (right) with his Democratic Senate colleague Edward I. Edwards in 1924.

In 1918 Edge was elected to the United States Senate, defeating George L. Record and Edward W. Gray in the Republican primary and Democratic candidate George W. La Monte in the general election. Although the term to which he had been elected began on March 4, 1919, the Senate was in recess at that time. In order to attend to remaining gubernatorial business, Edge did not resign as governor until May 16, 1919, and was sworn in as senator three days later.

The most important and controversial vote held by the Senate during Edge's term involved the Treaty of Versailles, the ratification of which would have allowed the United States to join the League of Nations. As a member of the moderate wing of the Republican Party, Edge was a "mild reservationist" on the question. Although he appears to have genuinely wanted the United States to enter the League of Nations, he believed that reservations to the treaty were needed both to protect national sovereignty and to secure the votes needed for ratification by the Senate. In November 1919 and again in March 1920, he voted to ratify the treaty with the Lodge Reservations.

Continuing his efforts to apply business management principles to government, in 1919 Edge introduced a joint resolution that led to the passage of the Budget and Accounting Act of 1921, which established the Bureau of the Budget (now called the Office of Management and Budget) and the General Accounting Office. Edge also sponsored the Edge Act, a 1919 Amendment to the Federal Reserve Act of 1913, which allowed National Banks (any banking institution chartered by the Office of the Comptroller of the Currency) to engage in international banking through federally chartered subsidiaries.

At the 1920 Republican National Convention that nominated Warren G. Harding for president, there was a movement to nominate Edge as candidate for vice president. Convention rules required the vote of a candidate's state delegation as a unit in support of the nomination, which Edge could not secure. In 1917, while governor, Edge had made an enemy of William P. Verdon, Republican leader of Hudson County, when Edge refused to appoint the man Verdon wanted as Hudson County prosecutor, Richard Doherty, as Verdon had expected that Doherty would wage a campaign against election fraud in Hudson County if appointed prosecutor. At the convention, Verdon kept his delegates from voting for Edge, thereby blocking the attempt to nominate him, and Verdon backed the nomination of Calvin Coolidge, the successful candidate.

Edge opposed prohibition and voted against the Volstead Act. In 1924, he ran for reelection advocating the repeal of the Eighteenth Amendment, which New Jersey had approved in 1922, after the end of his term as governor. He proposed a number of bills that would relax prohibition, including legislation authorizing the sale of alcoholic beverages with an alcohol content of 3%, and another bill to legalize the sale of beer with alcohol content of 2.75%. At some point he supported practically every anti-prohibition movement in the Senate.

Edge was reelected to the Senate in 1924, defeating prohibition advocate Hamilton Fish Kean in the Republican primary and Democratic candidate Frederick W. Donnelly in the general election.

In April 1929, it was reported that President Herbert Hoover would appoint Edge United States Ambassador to France. He did not resign from the Senate and take office as Ambassador, however, until November 21, 1929, a delay attributable to political issues involving the appointment of a Republican successor to fill his Senate seat and the desire to have his expertise in the Senate while tariff legislation was considered. During the course of the tariff debates, Edge proved a protectionist who voted in favor of higher tariffs on imported goods. The resulting tariff law, the Smoot-Hawley Tariff Act, was not enacted until the spring of 1930, several months after Edge left the Senate.

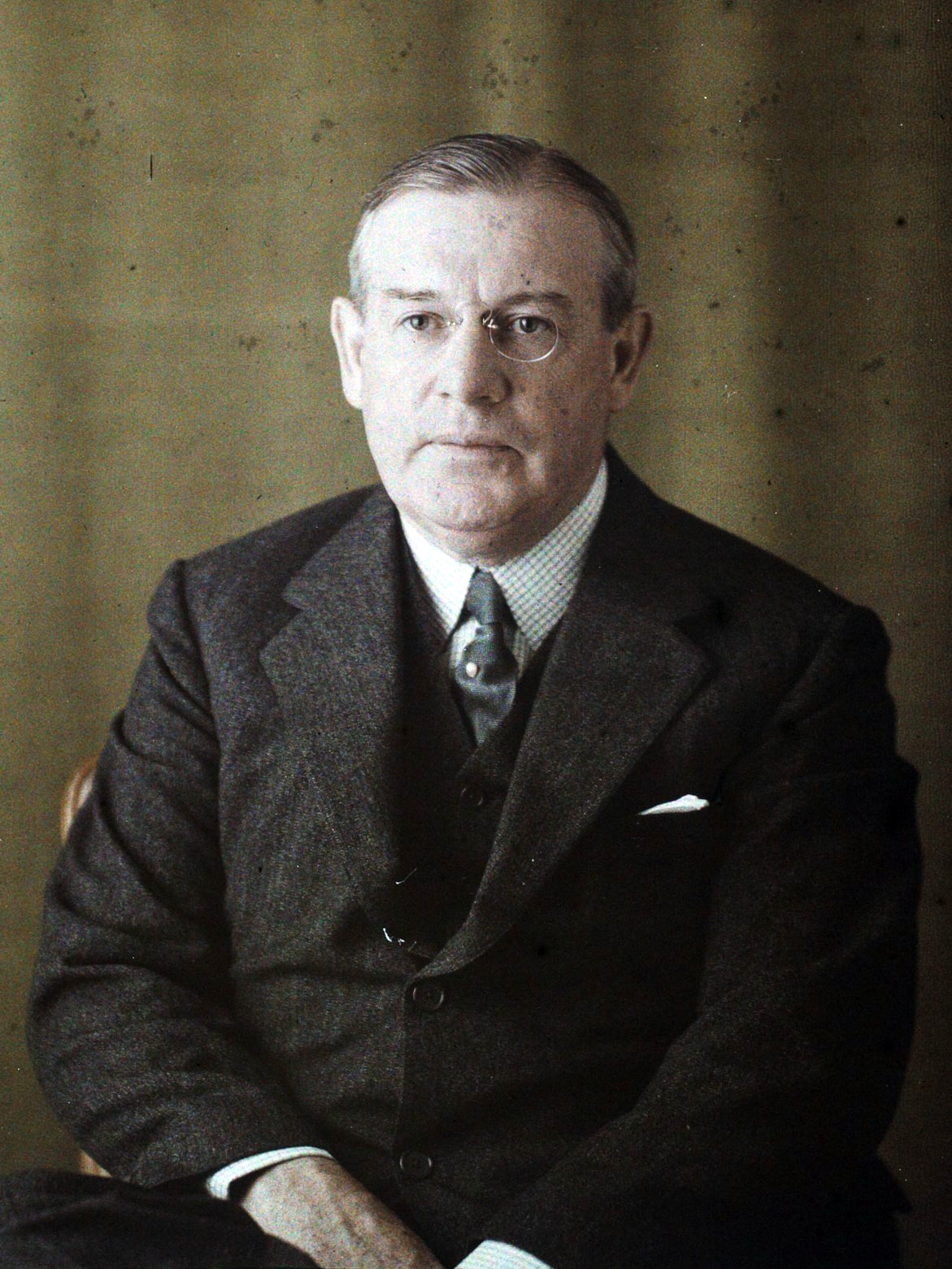
Autochrome portrait taken in Boulogne by Georges Chevalier, 1930

=== United States Ambassador to France, 1929–1933 ===
During his tenure as ambassador, Edge spent considerable time dealing with Franco-American trade issues, which were strained by tariff policies and the contentious post-World War I questions of war debts, reparations and disarmament. As ambassador, he was made an honorary vice president of the American Friends of Lafayette in 1932.

=== Governor of New Jersey, 1944–1947 ===
After his ambassadorship ended in 1933, Edge spent most of the next decade living a life of retirement, traveling, and serving as an elder statesman for the New Jersey Republican party. With the outbreak of World War II, Edge was eager to return to public service. In 1943 he agreed to run for governor provided no one opposed him in the Republican primary and the party maintained strong discipline, and party leaders accepted those conditions. Following his nomination, Edge faced Democratic candidate Vincent J. Murphy, mayor of Newark and state leader of the American Federation of Labor, in the general election. By now, any assistance provided to him by Hudson County Democratic boss Frank Hague in the 1916 election was long forgotten, and Edge hammered on the theme of Hague's power, campaigning that a vote for Murphy was a vote for the domination of "labor leaders, communists and Hagueism". Edge also advocated streamlining state government, early postwar planning and the adoption of a new state constitution, which he considered essential to modernizing state government and which had been actively supported by the incumbent Democratic governor, Charles Edison. In the November 1943 election, Edge defeated Murphy by a comfortable margin.

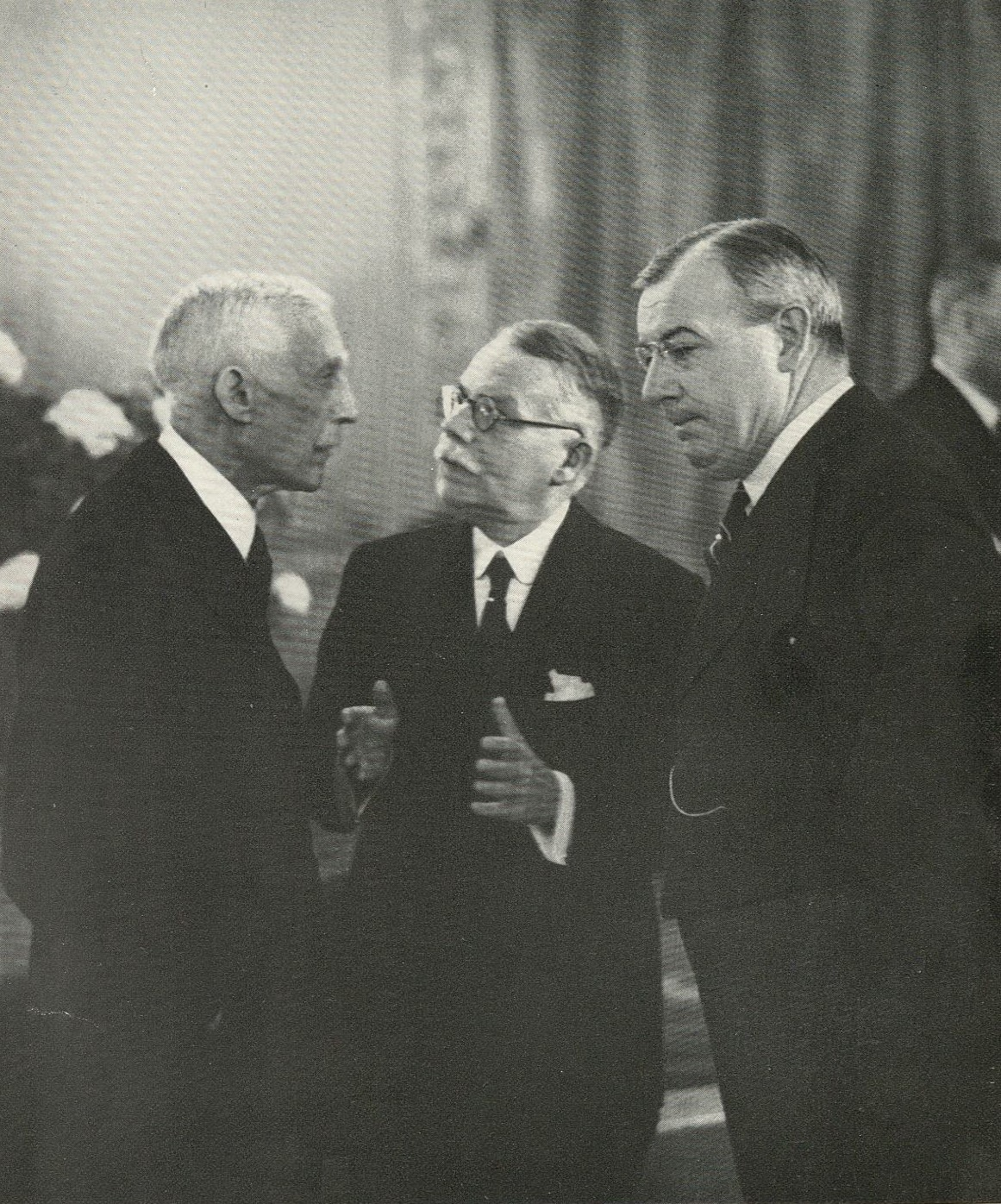
Edge (right) confers with Andrew W. Mellon and British ambassador William Tyrrell, 1st Baron Tyrrell, photographed by Erich Salomon in Famous Contemporaries in Unguarded Moments.

Edge's second term as governor was marked by numerous battles with Hague. In 1944, Edge and Hague fought over how certain railroad tax money should be allocated (with Hague's position ultimately prevailing), while Edge won the passage of legislation that required the use of voting machines in Hudson County to reduce the chance of electoral fraud. Edge also obtained legislation authorizing the governor to appoint jury commissioners for each county, bypassing county sheriffs, who had previously hand-picked grand jurors who they knew would refuse to indict those engaged in illegal activities protected by political bosses like Hague. The most important battle between Edge and Hague involved constitutional revision. In early 1944, Republican legislators drafted a new proposed constitution that would have, among other things, deprived Hague of a major source of patronage by restructuring the judiciary. Hague strongly opposed the revised constitution, and several weeks prior to the November 1944 election he launched a multi-pronged attack on it, charging that it would restrict the activities of labor unions, inhibit advancement opportunities for returning veterans, and subject all church owned property to taxation. Voters rejected the proposed constitution.

The Edge administration battled Hague on other fronts as well. Walter D. Van Riper, whom Edge had appointed state attorney general, took over the Hudson County prosecutor's office and brought in outside investigators. Van Riper aggressively prosecuted unlawful activities protected by the Hague organization. In June 1944, he led raids on Hudson County horse race betting rooms, later obtaining the indictments from newly constituted Hudson grand juries, the first indictments for such activities since Hague had come to power. In the process, gambling on horse racing in Hudson County was virtually eliminated. In early 1945 Hague retaliated by having his hand-picked United States Attorney bring two federal indictments against Van Riper, one charging check kiting and the other related to the alleged sale of gasoline in the black market. Van Riper went to trial on both indictments and was acquitted of all charges. Edge and Van Riper were undeterred and continued to apply pressure on Hague. Major state jobs, which Hague once had controlled, now went to Republicans. The state civil service system was reformed and freed from Hague's domination. The actions of the Edge administration took a heavy toll on Hague, who retired from active politics in 1947 during the administration of Edge's successor, Republican Alfred E. Driscoll.

Despite the defeat of constitutional revision, Edge was able to accomplish much of his program. A number of state boards and commissions were consolidated, and a Taxation and Finance Department was established to handle all fiscal matters. Legislation providing benefits to returning veterans was enacted, as was legislation intended to improve the living conditions of migrant workers. In 1945, Edge signed a series of laws banning racial or religious discrimination in public accommodations, employment, public school admissions, jury service and hospital care.

Much of Edge's last year in office was spent dealing with problems associated with the conversion to a peacetime economy and a wave of strikes.

== Relationship with Atlantic County Republican organization ==
Throughout Edge's political career, his home county, Atlantic County, was controlled by a Republican political machine that was extensively involved in the protection of Atlantic City's vice industry and other corruption. When Edge first ran for public office in 1904, he ran as a reformer against a candidate supported by the party establishment. Edge enlisted the support of many prominent Atlantic City citizens, and used his Atlantic City Daily Press to promote his candidacy and expose the activities of the machine. Edge fully expected to win the election and was shocked when he was defeated. He later blamed his defeat on the "Scott machine" (a reference to the organization led by County Clerk Lewis P. Scott) and party boss control of voting places and ballot counting.

After his defeat, Edge's Daily Press became a faithful supporter of the Republican organization. Edge subsequently ran with the support of the party establishment for state legislature, even campaigning when he ran for state senate in 1910 with Louis Kuehnle, Scott's successor as leader of the organization. When he ran for governor in 1916, Edge's campaign manager was Enoch "Nucky" Johnson, who had replaced Kuehnle as boss of the Atlantic County machine after Kuehnle was convicted of corruption related charges in 1911. Johnson and Hudson County Democratic leader Frank Hague were widely credited with engineering Edge's 1916 victory, and Johnson also served as Edge's campaign manager during his successful run for the United States Senate in 1918.

In 1924, however, the relationship between Edge and Johnson openly soured. In the Atlantic City Commission election that year, Johnson's organization backed a slate of candidates led by incumbent mayor Edward L. Bader. Bader was opposed by a ticket led by former mayor Harry Bacharach. The Bacharach ticket ran on an anti-vice platform and gained the support of Johnson's opponents. Bader's slate won the bitter election, which was marked by allegations of widespread organization-backed voter fraud. A month after the election, Edge replaced Johnson as the manager of his senate reelection campaign amid rumors that Johnson was unhappy about the "hands off" policy that Edge had taken during the recent election in which Johnson's leadership had been threatened. Thereafter, the Atlantic County Republican organization led by Johnson refused to support Edge in his 1924 primary election contest against Hamilton Fish Kean.

Although in 1927 Johnson touted Edge as a potential presidential candidate, in 1928 the two men openly broke. The initial indication of a break was Johnson's support of Hamilton Fish Kean for the Republican nomination for United States senator, while Edge was backing Edward C. Stokes. The split noticeably widened after Edge abandoned his policy of non-interference in purely local politics and backed Robert M. Johnston for Atlantic County state senator in the Republican primary. This prompted Johnson to openly back incumbent senator Emerson L. Richards, who was Edge's political and personal foe. The ensuing election was described as a "trial of strength in Atlantic County, the outcome of which may spell the doom of the loser". The election results proved to be a disaster for Edge, whose candidates lost Atlantic County to the Johnson backed candidates by margins exceeding three to one, and with Richards claiming the results marked Edge's "political extinction". In the wake of the election, Edge called for party unity, and Johnson attempted to brush aside any damage to Edge by denying claims that the election results meant the end of his political career or that the election had been against Edge.

Edge, who faced a reelection campaign in 1930, resigned from the United States Senate in 1929 to accept appointment as Ambassador to France.

In his 1948 memoirs, A Jerseyman's Journal, Edge makes no mention of either Kuehnle or Johnson, who was imprisoned in 1941 for income tax evasion. Johnson's successor as leader of the Atlantic County Republican organization, Frank S. Farley, is mentioned once, in connection with events that transpired while Edge was out-of-state during his second term as governor, and Farley, as state senate president, was acting governor. Edge's memoirs have been criticized for failing to discuss how he rose in politics and in skipping over the skullduggery involved in interesting political situations, and his failure to discuss his relationship and disagreements with the Atlantic County machine provide examples of those omissions.

== Later years and death ==
After Edge left office on January 21, 1947, he continued to promote constitutional reform, which was achieved later the same year with the adoption of the Constitution of 1947. Edge spent his final years as the elder statesman of the New Jersey Republican party. In 1951, he was one of the first prominent figures to back General Dwight D. Eisenhower for president. In 1953, he attended the coronation of King Faisal II of Iraq as President Eisenhower's representative.

Edge died on October 29, 1956, in New York City. He was buried at the Northwood Cemetery in Downingtown, Pennsylvania.

== Personal life ==
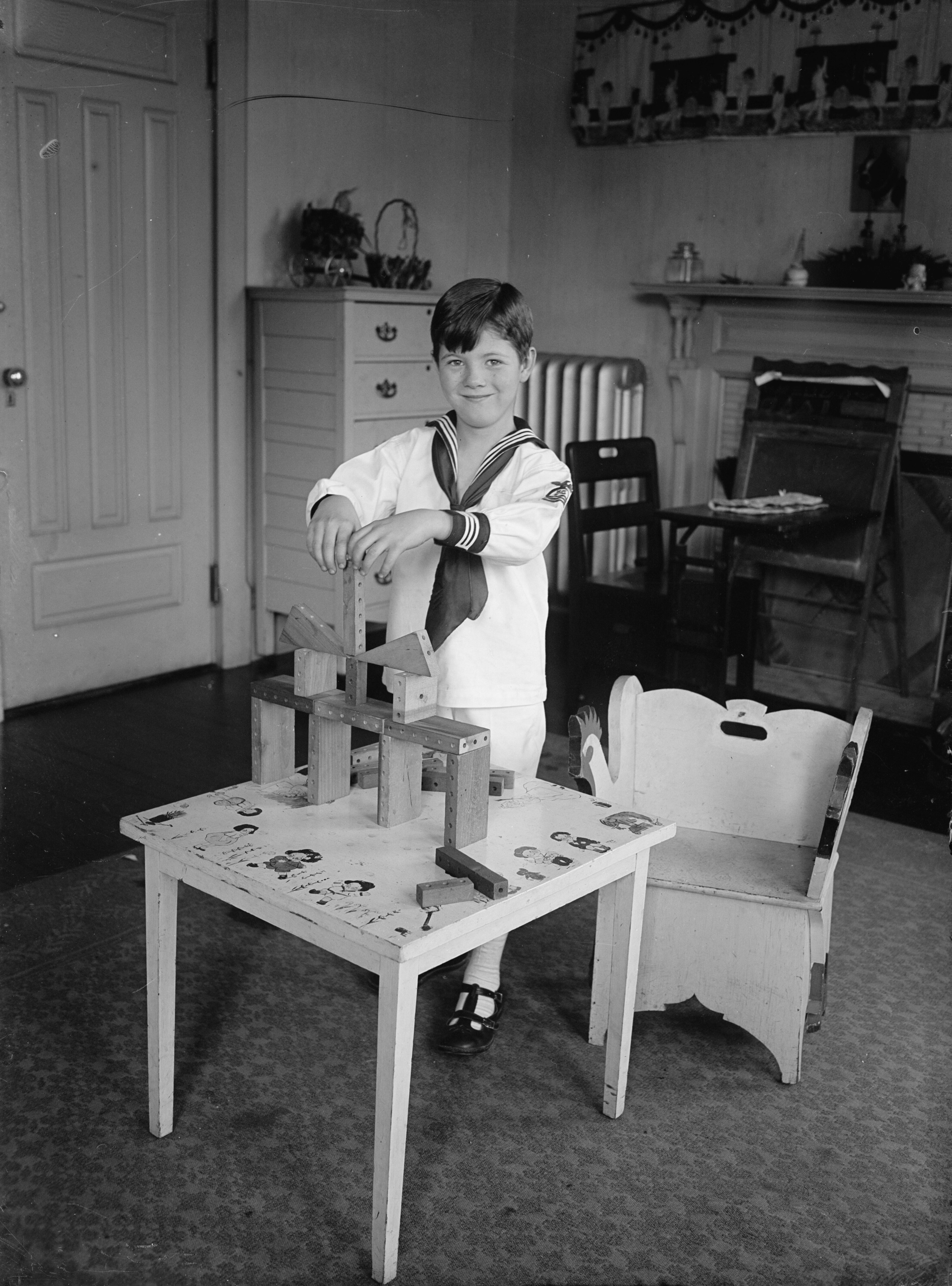
Edge's son Walter Jr. in 1922.

Edge married Estella Blanche Ailes of Lancaster, Pennsylvania on January 11, 1893. Apparently this marriage ended in divorce since Edge does not mention it in his memoirs. He married Lady Lee Phillips of Memphis, Tennessee on June 5, 1907. She died July 14, 1915, four days after the birth of their only child. On December 9, 1922, Edge married Camilla Sewall of Bath, Maine, the daughter of Harold M. Sewall, a former diplomat and close friend of President Warren G. Harding. Edge was forty-nine years old at the time, and his wife twenty-one. During Edge's term as Ambassador to France, his wife was known as "the youngest ambassadress". Walter and Camilla Edge had three children together.

In the early 1920s Edge lived in a cottage on States Avenue in Atlantic City that was near the Boardwalk. In 1923, he moved to a new beachfront home in Ventnor, New Jersey that was located between Oxford and Somerset Avenues. This was his official residence until the mid-1940s, and thereafter was used by him as a summer home.

In 1944, Edge purchased Morven, the historic Princeton, New Jersey home of Richard Stockton, from the Stockton family. The sale was subject to the condition that Morven would be given to the state of New Jersey within two years of Edge's death. Edge transferred possession of Morven to the state in 1954, and he spent the last few years of his life living in a small house in Princeton.

Edge was an avid sportsman who enjoyed fishing and hunting, especially hunting quail. After World War I, Edge purchased land in northern Leon County, Florida with his longtime friend, Walter C. Teagle, chairman of the Board of Standard Oil Company of New Jersey. They named the property Norias Plantation. In 1937 Edge sold his interests in Norias to Teagle and purchased the adjacent Sunny Hill Plantation, located in northern Florida near Thomasville, Georgia. Sunny Hill Plantation became Edge's winter home where he hunted and fished on the 15,000 acres (61 km^{2}) grounds.

Edge also maintained homes in Maine and Washington, D.C.

Edge was a Presbyterian while young, becoming a member of the Pleasantville Presbyterian Church in 1889, but later was an Episcopalian.

Edge was an active supporter of the Boy Scout movement in Atlantic County. He was a founder of the Atlantic City Boy Scout Council, and was its first president, a position that he held for four years. In 1929 he donated money that the Council used to purchase Camp Edge, located in Alloway, New Jersey. Edge was also a member of numerous Atlantic City and Atlantic County civic, fraternal, social and business organizations, including the Atlantic City Hospital Association, the Atlantic City Country Club, the Atlantic City Elks Lodge, Trinity Lodge No. 79 and Masonic Belcher Lodge No. 180 of the Free and Accepted Masons, and the Atlantic County Historical Society.

== Electoral history ==
Walter Edge electoral results, 1908–1943 (Note: Only candidates receiving greater than 1 percent of the vote are included in this table. For further detail, see the relevant article.)
Race	Republican	Votes	%	Democratic	Votes	%	Third Party	Party	Votes	%	Third Party	Party	Votes	%
1908 New Jersey Assembly	Walter Edge	[data missing]		[data missing]										
1909 New Jersey Senate	Walter Edge	[data missing]		[data missing]										
1912 New Jersey Senate	Walter Edge (inc.)	[data missing]		[data missing]										
1916 gubernatorial	Walter Edge	247,343	55.4%	Otto Wittpenn	177,696	39.8%	Socialist	Frederick Krafft	12,900	2.9%	Prohibition	Harry Vaughan	12,900	2.9%
1918 U.S. Senate	Walter Edge	179,022	50.3%	George M. La Monte	153,743	43.2%	Socialist	James Reilly	14,723	4.1%	Prohibition	Grafton Day	5,768	1.6%
1924 U.S. Senate	Walter Edge (inc.)	608,020	61.8%	Frederick W. Donnelly	331,034	33.7%	Progressive	George L. Record	37,795	3.8%				
1943 gubernatorial	Walter Edge	634,364	55.2%	Vincent J. Murphy	506,604	44.1%								

== Miscellaneous ==
In the 2000s, Edge's name (as Wally Edge) and likeness had renewed currency as the pseudonym of a prominent anonymous New Jersey political columnist, who, in 2010, was identified as former Livingston Mayor David Wildstein, and who would later become involved in the Fort Lee lane closure scandal known as "Bridgegate."

Geoff Pierson portrayed him in HBO's Boardwalk Empire.

== See also ==
- List of governors of New Jersey
- Edge Act

Political offices
Preceded by John W. Slocum	President of the New Jersey Senate; 1915	Succeeded by William T. Read
Preceded by James Fairman Fielder	Governor of New Jersey; January 15, 1917 – May 16, 1919	Succeeded by William Nelson Runyon; Acting Governor
Preceded by Charles Edison	Governor of New Jersey; January 18, 1944 – January 21, 1947	Succeeded by Alfred E. Driscoll
U.S. Senate
Preceded by David Baird	U.S. Senator (Class 2) from New Jersey; March 4, 1919 – November 21, 1929	Succeeded by David Baird, Jr.
Party political offices
Preceded by Edward C. Stokes	Republican Nominee for Governor of New Jersey; 1916	Succeeded by Newton A.K. Bugbee
Preceded by David Baird Sr.	Republican Nominee for the U.S. Senate (Class 2) from New Jersey; 1918, 1924	Succeeded by Dwight Morrow
Preceded by Robert C. Hendrickson	Republican Nominee for Governor of New Jersey; 1943	Succeeded by Alfred E. Driscoll
Diplomatic posts
Preceded by Myron T. Herrick	United States Ambassador to France; 1929–1933	Succeeded by Jesse I. Straus
