= Senator Hennessey =

Senator Hennessey or Hennessy may refer to:

- Charles O'Connor Hennessy (1860–1936), New Jersey State Senate
- Erin Hennessey (born 1976), New Hampshire State Senate
- Martha Hennessey (born 1954), New Hampshire State Senate
