= 1918 United States Senate election in New Jersey =

- November 7, 1918
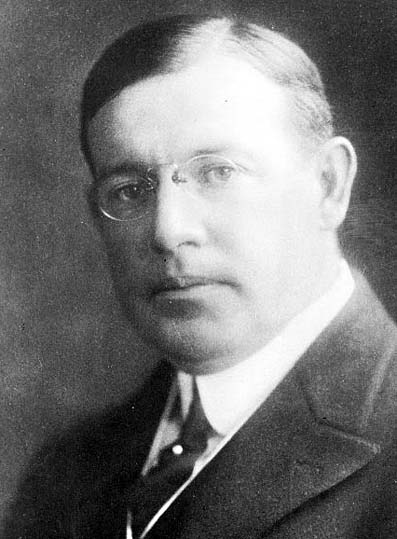

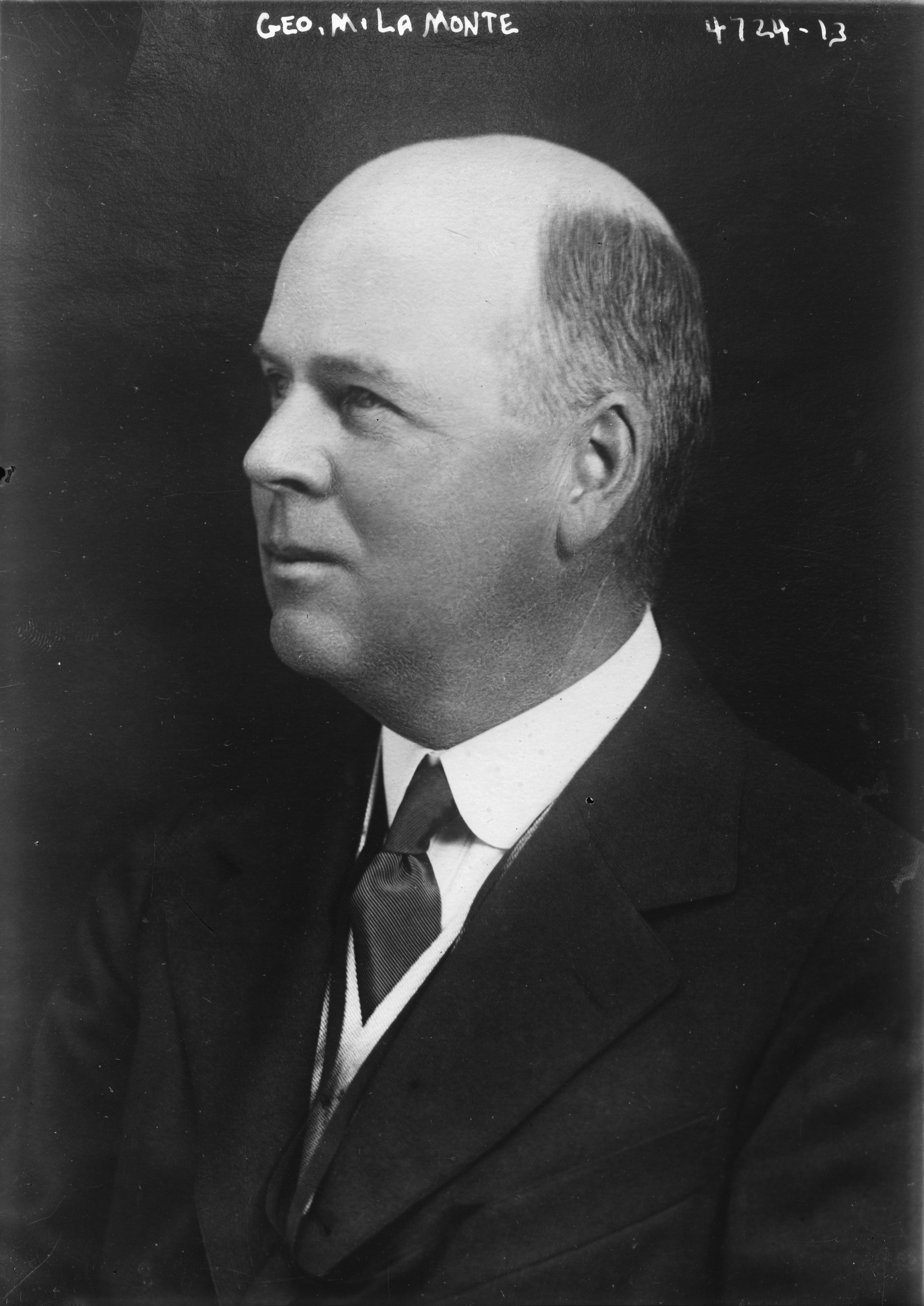
Nominee	Walter Evans Edge	George M. La Monte
Party	Republican	Democratic
Popular vote	179,022	153,743
Percentage	50.34%	43.23%
- County results Edge: 40–50% 50–60% 60–70% 70–80% Monte: 40–50% 50–60% 60–70%
Senator before election
David Baird Sr.
Republican
Elected Senator
Walter Evans Edge
Republican

The 1918 United States Senate elections in New Jersey were held on November 7, 1918.

Incumbent Democratic Senator William Hughes died in office in January. Republican governor of New Jersey Walter Evans Edge was elected to the six-year term over Democrat George LaMonte. In a special election held the same day, interim Senator David Baird Sr. (whom Edge had appointed) was elected to serve the remainder of Senator Hughes' term over Charles O'Connor Hennessy.

In the primary election on September 24, Edge easily won the Republican nomination over George L. Record and Edward W. Gray. LaMonte won a four-cornered primary over Charles O'Connor Hennessy, Alexander Simpson, and Frank M. McDermit.

Both Baird and Hennessy were unopposed in the special election primary.

== Democratic primary ==
=== Candidates ===
- Charles O'Connor Hennessy, former state senator from Bergen County and candidate for governor in 1916
- George LaMonte, former State Commissioner of Banking and Insurance
- Frank M. McDermit, perennial candidate from Newark
- Alexander Simpson, State Assemblyman from Hudson County

=== Results ===
1918 Democratic U.S. Senate primary
Party	Candidate	Votes	%
Democratic	George LaMonte	18,173	27.65%
Democratic	Alexander Simpson	17,519	26.65%
Democratic	Charles O'Connor Hennessy	16,904	25.72%
Democratic	Frank M. McDermit	13,137	19.99%
Total votes		65,733	100.00%

In the soldiers' vote, included in the totals above, Hennessey won 604 to 598 votes for Simpson, 578 votes for McDermit, and 545 votes for LaMonte.

=== Special results ===
Charles O'Connor Hennessy was unopposed for the nomination to the special election. He received 51,183 votes from civilians and 1,587 votes from soldiers. In Hunterdon County, LaMonte received two votes and McDermit received one.

== Republican primary ==
=== Candidates ===
- Walter Evans Edge, Governor of New Jersey
- Edward W. Gray, U.S. Representative from Jersey City
- George L. Record, Jersey City corporation counsel

=== Results ===
1918 Republican U.S. Senate primary
Party	Candidate	Votes	%
Republican	Walter Evans Edge	88,923	72.27%
Republican	George L. Record	17,168	13.95%
Republican	Edward W. Gray	16,959	13.78%
Total votes		123,050	100.00%

In the soldiers' vote, included in the totals above, Edge won 2,981 to 188 votes for Record and 129 votes for Gray.

=== Special results ===
Interim Senator Baird was unopposed for the nomination to the special election. He received 96,067 votes from civilians and 1,848 votes from soldiers.

== General election ==
=== Candidates ===
- Grafton E. Day (Prohibition)
- Walter Evans Edge, Governor of New Jersey (Republican)
- George M. La Monte, former State Commissioner of Banking and Insurance (Democratic)
- James M. Reilly, perennial candidate (Socialist)
- William J. Wallace (Single Tax)

=== Results ===
1918 United States Senate election in New Jersey
Party	Candidate	Votes	%
Republican	Walter Evans Edge	179,022	50.34%
Democratic	George M. LaMonte	153,743	43.23%
Socialist	James M. Reilly	14,723	4.14%
Prohibition	Grafton E. Day	5,768	1.62%
Single Tax	William J. Wallace	2,352	0.66%

== See also ==
- 1918 United States Senate elections
