= 1924 United States Senate election in New Jersey =

- November 4, 1924
- Turnout: 83%
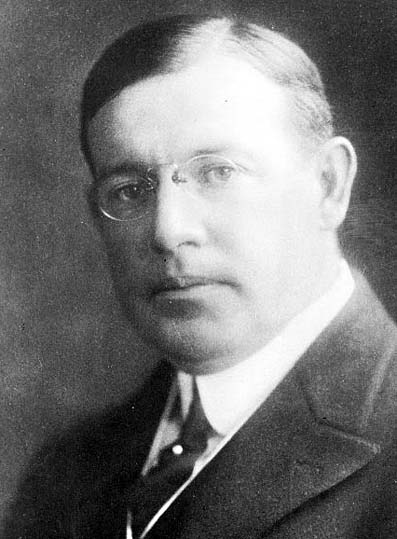

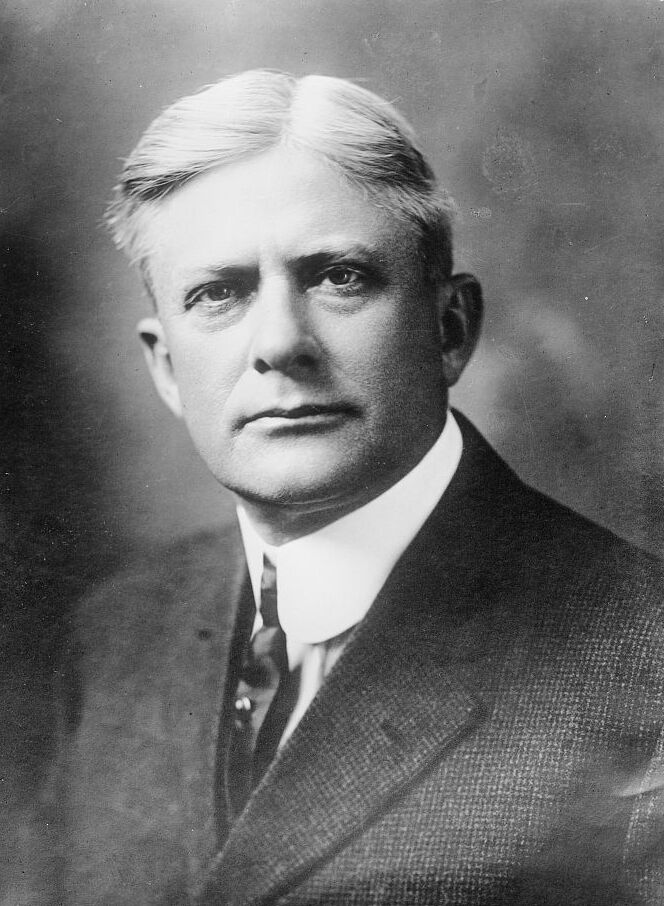
| Nominee | Walter Evans Edge | Frederick W. Donnelly |
| Party | Republican | Democratic |
| Popular vote | 608,020 | 331,034 |
| Percentage | 61.84% | 33.67% |
- County results Edge: 50–60% 60–70% 70–80% Donnelly: 50–60%
Senator before election
Walter Evans Edge
Republican
Elected Senator
Walter Evans Edge
Republican

The 1924 United States Senate election in New Jersey was held on November 4, 1924. Incumbent Republican Senator Walter Evans Edge was re-elected to a second term in office. He would not complete the term, resigning from office in 1929 to be sworn in as the U.S. Ambassador to France.

== Republican primary ==
=== Candidates ===
- Walter Evans Edge, incumbent Senator since 1919
- Hamilton Fish Kean, Republican National Committeeman and brother of former Senator John Kean

==== Declined ====
- Joseph S. Frelinghuysen Sr., former U.S. Senator (1917–23) (to run in 1928)

=== Campaign ===
Edge ran as a decided "wet," or opponent of Prohibition, while Kean was supported by the Anti-Saloon League. Kean also accused Edge of disloyalty to President Calvin Coolidge.

=== Results ===
Edge defeated Kean by a large plurality.

== Democratic primary ==
=== Candidates ===
- Frederick W. Donnelly, Mayor of Trenton

=== Results ===
Donnelly was unopposed for the Democratic nomination.

== General election ==
=== Candidates ===
- John C. Butterworth (Socialist Labor)
- Grafton E. Day (Prohibition)
- Frederick W. Donnelly, Mayor of Trenton (Democrat)
- Walter Evans Edge, incumbent United States Senator since 1919 (Republican)
- Herman G. Loew (Commonwealth Land)
- George L. Record, former Jersey City corporation counsel and perennial candidate (Progressive)
- Rudolf Vollgraf (Workers)

=== Results ===
1924 United States Senate election in New Jersey
| Party | Candidate | Votes | % |
|---|---|---|---|
| Republican | Walter Evans Edge (incumbent) | 608,020 | 61.84% |
| Democratic | Frederick W. Donnelly | 331,034 | 33.67% |
| Progressive | George L. Record | 37,795 | 3.84% |
| Prohibition | Grafton E. Day | 3,961 | 0.40% |
| Workers | Rudolf Vollgraf | 1,127 | 0.11% |
| Socialist Labor | John C. Butterworth | 1,000 | 0.10% |
| Commonwealth Land | Herman G. Loew | 238 | 0.02% |
| Majority | | 276,986 | 28.17% |
| Turnout | | 983,175 | |
| Republican hold | | | |

== See also ==
- 1924 United States Senate elections
