= Austen Colgate =

American politician from New Jersey (1852–1924)

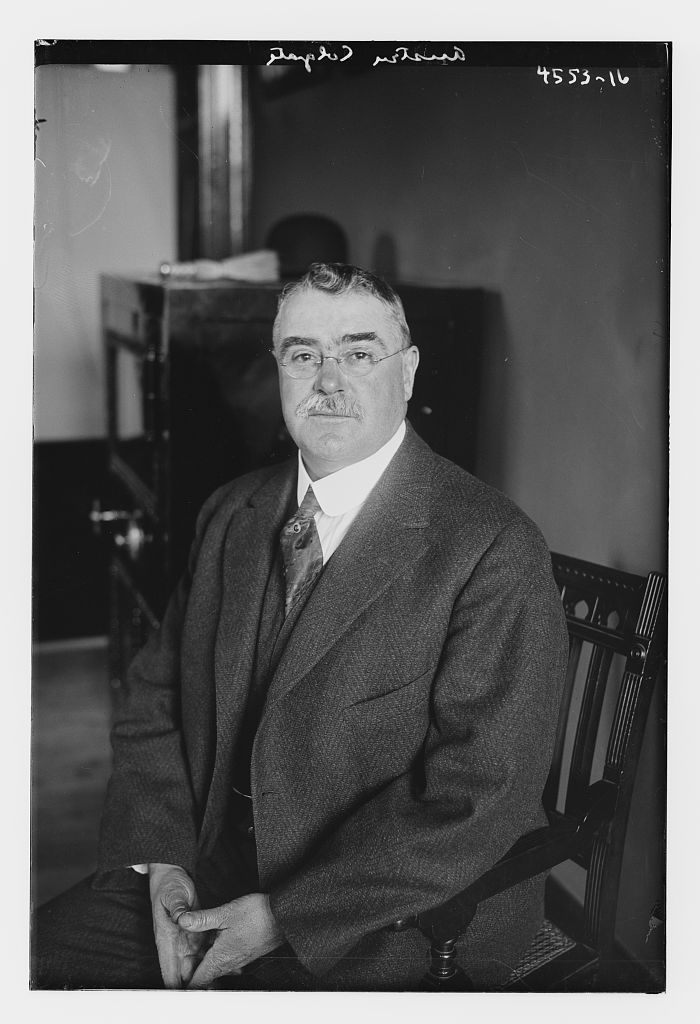

Member of the New Jersey Senate from Essex County
- In office 1912–1916
- Preceded by: Harry V. Osborne
- Succeeded by: Edmund Burke Osborne

Member of the New Jersey General Assembly from Essex County
- In office 1906–1907
- In office 1908–1910

Personal details
- Born: August 12, 1863 Orange, New Jersey
- Died: September 5, 1927 (aged 64) Barnegat Bay, New Jersey
- Party: Republican
- Education: Orange High School; Norwich Academy
- Alma mater: Yale University (A.B.)

Austen Colgate (August 12, 1863 – September 5, 1927) was an American businessman and Republican Party politician who represented Essex County, New Jersey in the New Jersey Senate. He was a candidate for governor of New Jersey in 1916 but narrowly lost the Republican primary to Walter Edge.

== Early life and education ==
Austen Colgate was born on August 12, 1863, in Orange, New Jersey, to Samuel and Elizabeth (née Morse) Colgate. His grandfather, William Colgate, was a leading American industrialist who in 1806 had founded William Colgate & Company, the leading American manufacturer of soaps and perfumes. Colgate University in Hamilton, New York is also named after the family.

He was educated at Orange High School and Norwich Academy. He graduated from Yale University in 1886 with a bachelor's degree.

== Business career ==
After graduating from Yale, Colgate joined the family business, focusing on manufacturing. In 1896, he was made a partner in the firm, and along with his brothers and cousins, Colgate managed the family's large business holdings. He was later named vice president of the company, a position he retained until his retirement in 1926, and oversaw production at the company's factory in Jersey City.

== Political and militia career ==
=== New Jersey legislature ===
In 1905, Colgate entered politics as a progressive Republican. In 1905, he was elected to represent Essex County in the New Jersey General Assembly, serving in the 130th Assembly. He was re-elected in 1907 and 1908, serving in the 132nd and 133rd assemblies. In 1911, Colgate was elected to represent Essex in the New Jersey Senate. He was re-elected to a second term in 1914. He served in the 136th through 140th legislatures.

In the legislature, Colgate was remarkably active. He introduced numerous bills to advance progressive and humanitarian causes, including proposals to exempt public playgrounds from accident claims, ban drunk and reckless driving, extend workers' compensation benefits to cover occupational diseases, establish a minimum wage commission, cap the criminal sentencing of children under sixteen, protect fish and game, control mosquitos, mediate labor disputes, reform the child welfare system, permit women police officers, expand public record-keeping, require licensing for dance halls, and expand public funding for the care of tuberculosis patients and the developmentally disabled. He also promoted legislation for the government study of blindness and mental retardation.

In the field of political reform, Colgate also successfully supported laws establishing a direct primary, reforming child labor, establishing the Civil Service Commission and Public Utility Commission, a widows' pension act, and a long line of other successful progressive measures.

=== National Guard service ===
In 1908, Governor John Franklin Fort appointed Colgate to as his personal aide and chief of staff to the New Jersey National Guard, in which role he served until 1911, when he was appointed deputy adjutant general of New Jersey by Governor Woodrow Wilson. He declined an offer to succeed adjutant general Wilbur F. Sadler Jr. in 1916 and retired from active duty in 1917. He was also a member of Troop A of the New York State National Guard.

=== 1916 gubernatorial campaign ===
In 1916, Colgate resigned from the Senate to run for the Republican nomination for governor of New Jersey. He was narrowly defeated by Walter Edge, who was aided by Jersey City political boss Frank Hague. In the same year, he was elected to represent New Jersey in the electoral college, where he voted for Republican nominee Charles Evans Hughes.

== Personal life, philanthropy and death ==
Colgate never married.

Colgate was an active local philanthropist, heading the Welfare Federation of the Oranges and contributing generously to local community organizations, including sponsoring free public concerts and the construction of a hospital and free public playground in Orange. He hosted an annual Independence Day fireworks celebration for the public at his home at 491 South Center Street in Orange. Colgate was also a member of the board of trustees of his family's namesake Colgate University, where he was awarded an honorary Doctor of Laws in 1926, and the board of corporators of the Peddie Institute.

He also served as president of the Essex Country Club and a member of the Baltusrol Golf Club, Rumson Country Club, University Club of New York, the Rotary Club of Jersey City, the Jersey City Consistory, the Railroad Club of New York, and The Yale Club of New York City. He was a Freemason and a member of other fraternal and service organizations.

=== Death and legacy ===
Colgate died on September 5, 1927, of a severe heart attack at his hunting and fishing lodge on Barnegat Bay. He had suffered heart disease for the prior year, leading him to retire from business. His estate contributed large sums to Colgate University to establish the Austen Colgate Scholarship, and to Peddie School, which built Austen Colgate Hall in his honor.
