= 1922 United States Senate election in New Jersey =

- November 7, 1922
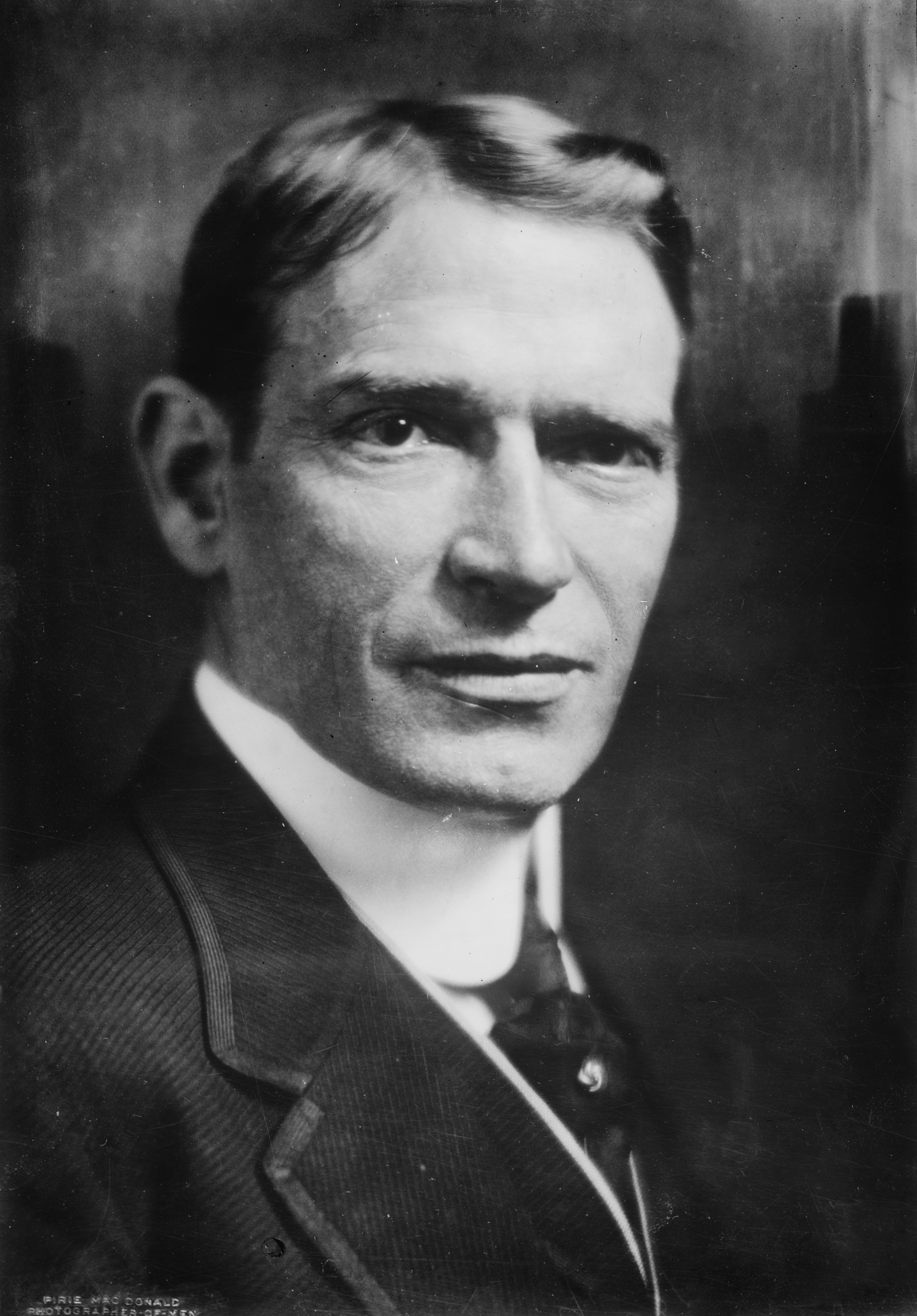

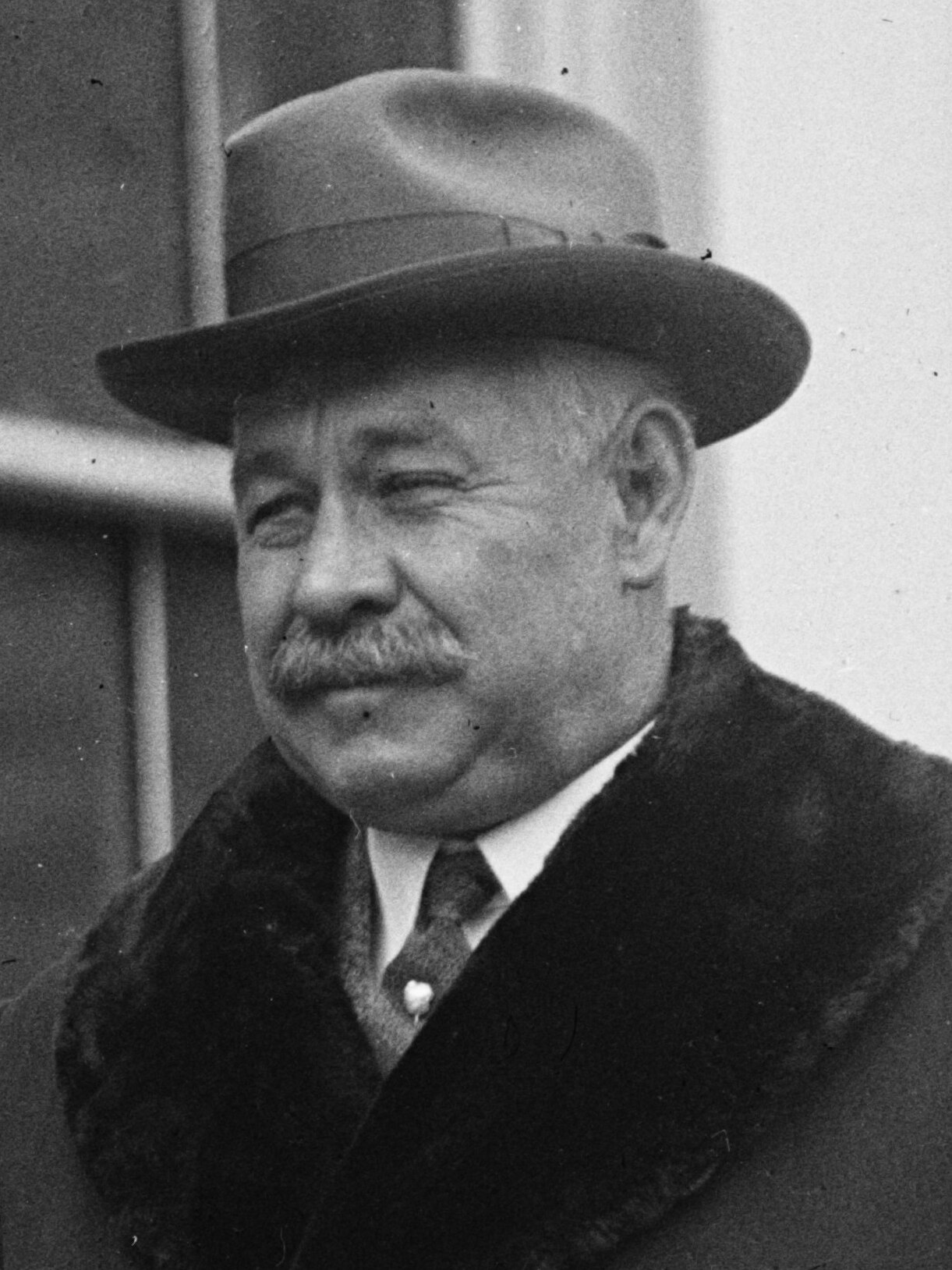
| Nominee | Edward I. Edwards | Joseph S. Frelinghuysen Sr. |
| Party | Democratic | Republican |
| Popular vote | 451,832 | 362,699 |
| Percentage | 54.87% | 44.05% |
- County results Edwards: 50–60% 70–80% Frelinghuysen: 40–50% 50–60% 60–70%
Senator before election
Joseph S. Frelinghuysen Sr.
Republican
Elected Senator
Edward I. Edwards
Democratic

The United States Senate election of 1922 in New Jersey was held on November 7, 1922. Incumbent Republican senator Joseph Frelinghuysen ran for re-election to a second term in office but was defeated by Democratic governor Jersey Edward I. Edwards.

Primary elections were held September 26. Frelinghuysen defeated a progressive challenger, George Record, in the Republican primary, while Edwards was unopposed for the Democratic nomination.

This was the second of four straight elections to this seat in which the incumbent was defeated.

== Republican primary ==
=== Candidates ===
- Joseph S. Frelinghuysen Sr., incumbent U.S. senator since 1917
- George Lawrence Record, former Jersey City corporation counsel

=== Campaign ===
Though Frelinghuysen was opposed in the primary by George Record, who had made several unsuccessful campaigns for office, Frelinghuysen was assured of strong political backing and considered a heavy favorite for renomination.

Record criticized Frelinghuysen's vote to acquit Truman Handy Newberry and declared that he was out to break up the "Millionaires' Club" in the Senate. He was informally endorsed by many union officials, whom he had counseled as a private attorney.

=== Results ===
Frelinghuysen defeated Record by a two-to-one margin.

== Democratic primary ==
=== Candidates ===
- Edward I. Edwards, governor of New Jersey

==== Withdrew ====
- Alexander Simpson, State Senator from Hudson County

==== Declined ====
- William B. Gourley, Paterson attorney
- Henry van Dyke Jr., Princeton University professor of English literature

=== Campaign ===
The first candidate to announce for the Democratic nomination was state senator Alexander Simpson. On April 14, Governor Edward Edwards announced his candidacy as a "wet," or anti-Prohibitionist candidate. Simpson, who claimed he had not entered the race until Edwards had pledged not to run, withdrew.

=== Results ===
Edwards was ultimately unopposed for the nomination.

== General election ==
=== Candidates ===
- George A. Bauer (Socialist)
- John C. Butterworth (Socialist Labor)
- Edward I. Edwards (Democrat), Governor of New Jersey
- Joseph S. Frelinghuysen (Republican), incumbent Senator
- James P. Love (Independent Lincoln)
- William J. Wallace (Single Tax), candidate for Mayor of New York City in 1917
- Louis F. Wolf (Workers)

=== Results ===
1922 United States Senate election in New Jersey
| Party | Candidate | Votes | % | ±% |
|---|---|---|---|---|
| Democratic | Edward I. Edwards | 451,832 | 54.87% | |
| Republican | Joseph S. Frelinghuysen Sr. (incumbent) | 362,699 | 44.05% | |
| Socialist | George A. Bauer | 5,970 | 0.73% | |
| Workers | Louis F. Wolf | 915 | 0.11% | |
| Socialist Labor | John C. Butterworth | 892 | 0.11% | |
| Single Tax | William J. Wallace | 577 | 0.07% | |
| Independent Lincoln | James P. Love | 553 | 0.07% | |
| Total votes | | 823,438 | 100.00% | |

== See also ==
- 1922 United States Senate elections
