= Everett Colby =

American banker and politician

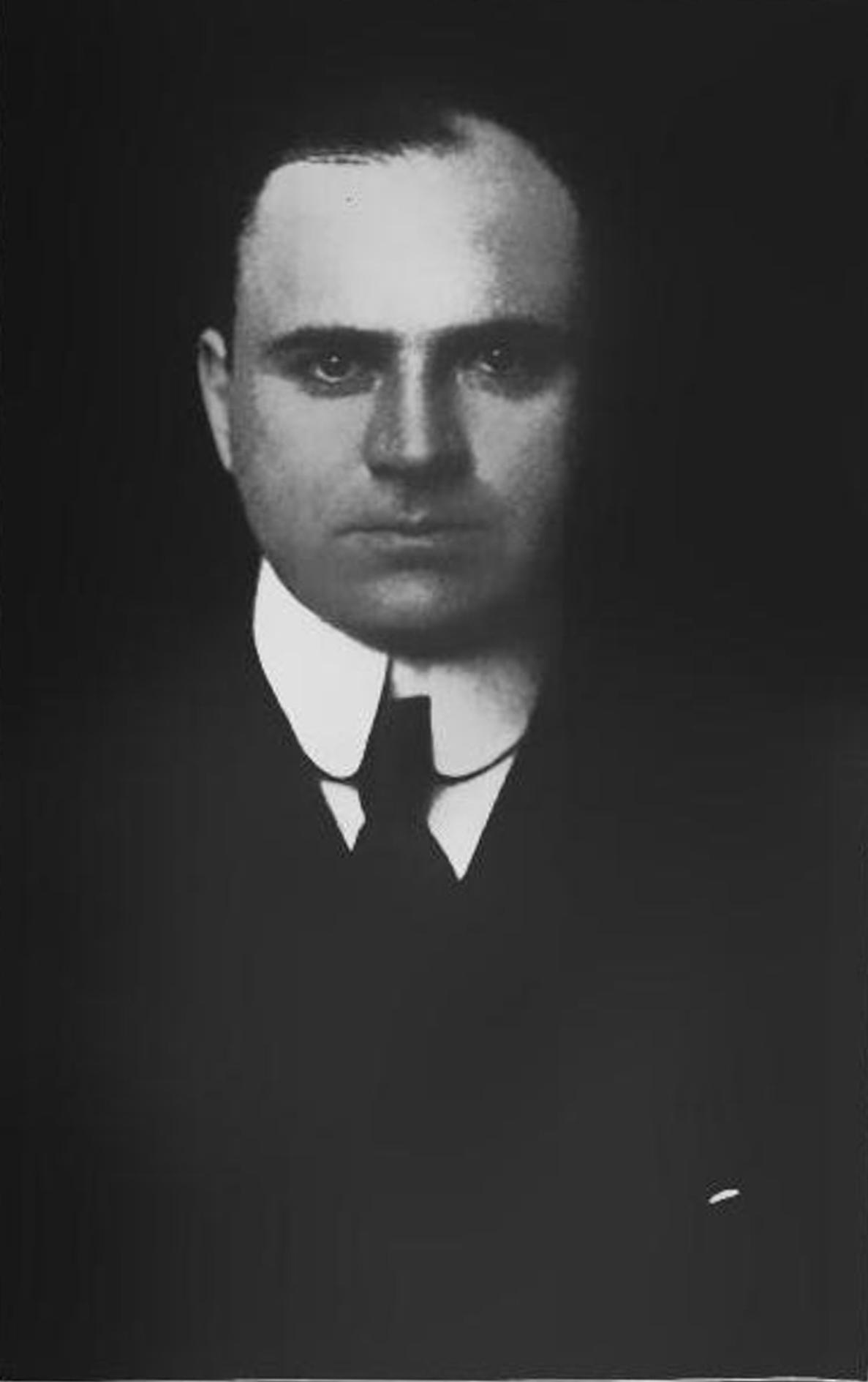
- Colby c. 1909

Member of the New Jersey Senate from Essex County
- In office 1906–1909
- Preceded by: J. Henry Bacheller
- Succeeded by: Harry V. Osborne

Member of the New Jersey General Assembly
- In office 1904–1906

Personal details
- Born: December 10, 1874 Milwaukee, Wisconsin, U.S.
- Died: June 19, 1943 (aged 68) Montclair, New Jersey, U.S.
- Party: Republican; Progressive
- Education: Browning School
- Alma mater: Brown University

Everett Colby (December 10, 1874 – June 19, 1943) was an American banker and politician who represented Essex County, New Jersey in the New Jersey Assembly and the New Jersey Senate from 1906 to 1909. He developed a record as a reformist and opponent of corporations and machine politics, often drawing him into conflict with the leaders of his own Republican Party. In 1913, he ran as the Progressive Party nominee for Governor of New Jersey.

== Early life ==
Everett Colby was born in Milwaukee on December 10, 1874. His father, Charles L. Colby, was the Vice President (and later President) of the Wisconsin Central Railroad.

Colby attended the Browning School in New York City, where his classmates included John D. Rockefeller Jr., Percy Rockefeller, and Harold Fowler McCormick. His teacher J.A. Browning said that Colby was a good sportsman but a poor scholar, who had great difficulty concentrating or reading but enjoyed woodwork.

Colby graduated from Brown University in 1897, again alongside John D. Rockefeller Jr. He was still an avid sportsman and played tennis, golf, baseball, and football. He was football captain in his senior year.

In 1898, Colby's father died, and he made a tour of the world. He then studied law and played polo. He married and settled in Llewellyn Park, Orange, New Jersey. He became a Wall Street broker and entered politics. His father had campaigned in Wisconsin as a railroad man and Everett had become convinced, from an early age, that he would one day become a politician. With this end in mind, he had studied law and joined the debating society in college. He openly acknowledged that he enjoyed the showmanship of politics and was at first unsure of the course his political career would take. He simply wanted to go into politics–not to accomplish anything in particular. At first he served in minor positions, assisting other politicians, and over time he developed his own political consciousness.

Colby became convinced that the American political system had become perverted from a representative democracy to a plutocratic tyranny. He had been advised to gain experience by joining forces with Major Carl Lentz, the chairman of the Republican County Committee of Essex County. Lentz allowed him to be the introductory speaker at some meetings and Colby gained experience in giving speeches. He then transferred to the staff of Governor Voorhees. Voorhees appointed him a Commissioner on the State Board of Education. Colby worried that his own desultory education might make him unfit for the position but he did very well and Lentz made him chairman of the executive committee of the Republican organization of West Orange in 1902. The next year, Lentz encouraged Colby to run for state senator for Essex. When Colby pointed out that he was under the constitutional age for the senate, Lentz offered to "fix the Manual" where the statistics of legislators were kept. Colby refused but agreed to nomination for the State Assembly and was elected Assemblyman from Essex.

== New Jersey General Assembly ==
Colby's session as an assemblyman was a gradual education and disillusionment. One day, early in the session, Sam Dickinson asked Colby to introduce certain excise bills. Dickinson was Secretary of State and Republican leader of Hudson County. Colby found the proposed taxes dubious and an attempt to take control of Hudson County from the Democratic Party. Colby went to consult Governor Franklin Murphy and when Murphy pronounced the bills "all right", Colby was reassured. At the same time, Colby wanted to introduce a bill to clean up pollution of the Passaic River but the Republicans did not have enough votes for all the bills to pass. Colby and some other Republicans appealed to the Democratic assemblymen from Hudson who agreed to support the cleanup bill if the excise bills were dropped. Dickinson consented and Colby's bill was passed. Then Dickinson asked Colby to reintroduce the excise bills. Colby was astonished and refused to break his word. "Your word to a Democrat doesn't mean anything," they told him in those very terms. The party jammed through the excise bills but Colby voted against them, retaining his honor.

Colby continued to make enemies in his own party by voting in opposition to their views on major issues. Later he acknowledged that some of his decisions were bad ones. They tried to buy his cooperation by making him floor leader of the Republican majority in the Assembly. They handled him very carefully, concealing information from him and approaching him through men he liked. Republicans had attempted to introducing a bill requiring twenty percent approval by shareholders for a lawsuit to be filed against a corporation by its workforce. The party sent Percy Rockefeller to convince Colby to support the bill. He failed and Colby convinced Rockefeller that the bill was a bad one. When both Governor Murphy and Governor Stokes then attempted to convert Colby, this opened the eyes of the young legislator to the fact that his party represented the interests of corporations.

During the 1904 session, Mark M. Fagan, the mayor of Jersey City, attempted to obtain relief from the burden the railroads placed upon the city. They paid almost no taxes to the city and Fagan, a Republican appealed to the Republican leadership including Colby. At first Colby supported the bill, but when he was told by his party leaders that the bill was "badly drawn," he changed his position. When asked why, he replied that he was too inexperienced to draw up a bill himself. He said:

We were incompetent. Perhaps some of us might, once upon a time, have been legislators; but boss rule was so old there that we didn't, we couldn't think for ourselves. We had lost the art of independent thought and work. We were dummies. We took orders, we waited for orders, we depended upon orders. Dummy legislators, that's what we were.

Frustrated with their own party, Mayor Fagan and his corporation counsel George L. Record went to the Democrats who drew up a bill. The bill was buried in committee. Fagan went to Colby and asked him why he didn't have it reported. "I can't," Colby told him, "I'm not really a leader. I'm the real leader's dummy." A year later, at a Republican caucus, Colby asked why the bill could not be debated in the Assembly. "Why, 'the Penn' (Pennsylvania Railroad) would raise hell," was the reply. "There was the reason, the real reason," said Colby in an interview later. "When the Mayor who represented the people of the second city in the state asked the legislature to consider a bill in their interest, that Jersey legislature couldn't because it represented 'the Penn,' a foreign corporation."

Republican Mayor Fagan sent an open letter to Governor Murphy and it was read aloud in the General Assembly. It said, among other things:

...The present session is drawing to a close. Its record is ... disgraceful. Its control by corporation interests ... has been absolute. ... For that condition the Republican party is responsible. ... What is the meaning of all this? The answer is plain! A Republican legislature is controlled by the railroad, trolley, and water corporations. And the interests of the people are being betrayed.

Later Colby said, "I was sore at myself. It was true. We were dummies; we betrayed the people who elected us." In response, Colby threw himself into a study of taxation.

In 1905, Colby wanted to run for Speaker of the Assembly but was discouraged by his party leaders. His refractory ways troubled them greatly. But they told him that he could not be elected. He knew this was untrue because he had pledges from his colleagues. So he ignored them. He was summoned to a meeting with Senator Dryden, the president of Prudential Life Insurance Company. Dryden told him that if he ran for Speaker, it would weaken the prestige of their delegation to run and fail. Colby told him about the pledges and Dryden responded, "But Tom McCarter says it won't do." That settled it. McCarter spoke for the trolley business. Colby agreed not to run but decided to run as a freelance.

The city of Newark was as plagued by corruption and bribery as was Jersey City. Both the Democrats and Republicans were involved in this. A few members of reform movements came to Colby with pleas of support. William P. Martin headed a few young men, mainly Republicans, who got into councils and opposed steadfastly the public utility grabs. Not finding satisfaction at the local level, both sides went to the legislature. The citizens of Newark petitioned the legislature to forbid their council to grant any franchise for a period longer than twenty-five years. They found that none of their legislators would touch their bill. They didn't represent them, they represented big business. This is when they appealed to Colby. He said that he would have to study the subject.

Soon thereafter, Colby was at a dinner and walked over to Tom McCarter afterwards and asked him if he knew about the proposed bill. McCarter was not interested in discussing the matter. He clapped his hands together in Colby's face saying that he would not accept anything but perpetual franchises. Colby said that had he tried to persuade him with reason, he could probably have been swayed but this was eye-opening. McCarter considered his dictatorial powers absolute. Later McCarter's brother Uzel tried to persuade Colby with flattery, "We think you have a political future before you, and we don't want to see you throw it away." Uncorrupted, Colby decided to introduce a resolution to put the legislature on record, believing that a limited franchise bill could not be passed. He told no one of it except Assembly leader Edward Duffield. Colby rose and offered a resolution to the effect that it was the sense of the Assembly that perpetual grants of monopolies to corporations should not be made. The leader adopted the resolution with not one negative vote. But before the Speaker declared the resolution carried, the Assembly woke up and begged, "Can't you give us time?"

== Other achievements ==
Colby was a trustee of his alma mater Brown University from 1905 to 1940. He was a member of the New Jersey board of Education from 1902 to 1904. He was a member of the New Jersey General Assembly from 1903 to 1905, and of the state senate from 1906 to 1909. An ardent supporter of President Theodore Roosevelt, he was Progressive candidate for governor of New Jersey in 1912. He was chairman of the executive committee of the League of Nations Non-Partisan Association and of the National World Court Committee. He served in the United States Food Administration in 1917. He was a major in the Officers Reserve Corps in 1918.

== Personal life ==
When Everett was 15 years old, the city of Everett, Washington, was named after him at an 1890 dinner party at his father's home, as suggested by Henry Hewitt. The city was started just two years later.

Colby married Edith Hyde of Plainfield, New Jersey, in 1903. Four of their children survived him. A resident of West Orange, New Jersey, he died on June 19, 1943, in Montclair, New Jersey. He had been suffering from a heart condition for several weeks. An obituary in the Bradford Era read:

Had Everett Colby died 30 or 35 years ago, his death would have been reported all over the country. A young man of wealth, he attracted attention because he had not let business or social pleasures swallow him up, but devoted his life to public service. Within 10 years, however, for some unknown reason, Colby ceased his efforts. Now he is gone—a man made famous for a time by his ideals, who then lost his enthusiasm for public service and died relatively unknown.

In spite of his fading from public awareness, he continued working for Republican politics. He was also active in a nationwide movement to promote temperance through education rather than by statute, and in 1935 he enlisted the support of Edsel Ford and John D. Rockefeller Jr. in this endeavor.

Party political offices
Preceded by None	Progressive Nominee for Governor of New Jersey; 1913	Succeeded by None
