= J. Henry Bacheller =

New Jersey Assembly member (1858–1937

Member of the New Jersey Senate from Essex County
- In office 1903–1906
- Preceded by: Thomas N. McCarter
- Succeeded by: Everett Colby

Member of the New Jersey General Assembly from Essex County
- In office 1900–1902

President of the Newark Board of Aldermen
- In office 1903–1903

Member of the Newark Board of Aldermen from the 9th ward
- In office 1887–1901

Personal details
- Born: February 1, 1869 Newark, New Jersey
- Died: December 12, 1939 (aged 70) Newark, New Jersey
- Party: Republican

Joseph Henry Bacheller (February 1, 1869 – December 12, 1939) was an American banker, philanthropist, and Republican Party politician from Newark, New Jersey. He served as a member of the Newark board of aldermen from 1887 to 1901 and served as its president in 1903. He also represented Essex County in the New Jersey General Assembly in 1901 and the New Jersey Senate from 1903 to 1906.

== Early life and education ==
Joseph Henry Bacheller was born on February 1, 1869, to John Collins Bacheller and Harriet (née Parcells) Bacheller. The Bacheller family first arrived in the Americas around 1630 in Ipswich, Massachusetts and settled much of Massachusetts. John Collins Bacheller was a manufacturer and the first Bacheller, in the ninth generation, to permanently move to Newark, New Jersey.

Joseph was educated in the Newark public schools.

== Business career ==
After graduating school, Bacheller joined New York Life Insurance Company as a clerk.

In 1890, Bacheller was hired by Samuel S. Dennis to manage the real estate holdings of the late A. L. Dennis, who had been an early promoter of the Camden and Amboy Railroad and Transportation Company. He continued that work until around 1919, when the last of Dennis's holdings were sold.

He served as president of the Ironbound Trust Company from 1909 through 1927, when it was merged into the Fidelity Union Trust. He served as vice president of Fidelity Union until 1931, when he was elected its president. Following his election, he predicted an end to the Great Depression, telling a meeting of the Newark Advertising Club that his study of the financial panics of 1873 and 1893 led him to believe that depressions were caused by "extravagance, speculation and inflation." He urged the advertisers to "preach optimism and thus add your voice to a restoration of confidence which we have so sadly lacked and which now seems at hand."

== Political career ==
Bacheller was a member of the Republican Party. From 1887 to 1901, he represented the ninth ward on the Newark board of aldermen. For several years, he chaired the Finance Committee. In 1903, he was president of the board of aldermen.

In 1900, he was elected to represent Essex County in the New Jersey General Assembly. He served through 1902 and was a member of several important committees. In 1903, he was elected to the New Jersey Senate, defeating Samuel Kalisch, who later became a justice of the Supreme Court of New Jersey. He served in the Senate through 1905 and chaired the Committee on Municipal Corporations.

Mayor of Newark Henry Meade Doremus appointed Bacheller to serve on the city's Shade Tree Commission, and he was its first president. In 1905, Doremus also appointed him as comptroller of the city. He served until 1911. From 1907 through 1913, he served on the New Jersey Water Supply Commission and was its president in 1913. From 1922 to 1923, he was president of the Newark Board of Education.

== Personal life and death ==
Bacheller married Edith Adele Smith. They had four children: Murriel, Adele, Joseph Henry Jr., and John Smith Bacheller. Edith served as president of both the Baptist Home for the Aged and the Newark YWCA. She died on September 9, 1938.

He was president of the Children's Aid Society of Newark, a director of the Newark YMCA, a member of the Essex Club and Downtown Club of Newark and president of Rockaway River Country Club. He was a trustee of the Newark Free Public Library and a member of the Newark Sinking Fund Commission.

He died on December 12, 1939, after a long illness.
