= Edmund B. Osborne House =

Historic house in Iowa, United States

- U.S. National Register of Historic Places
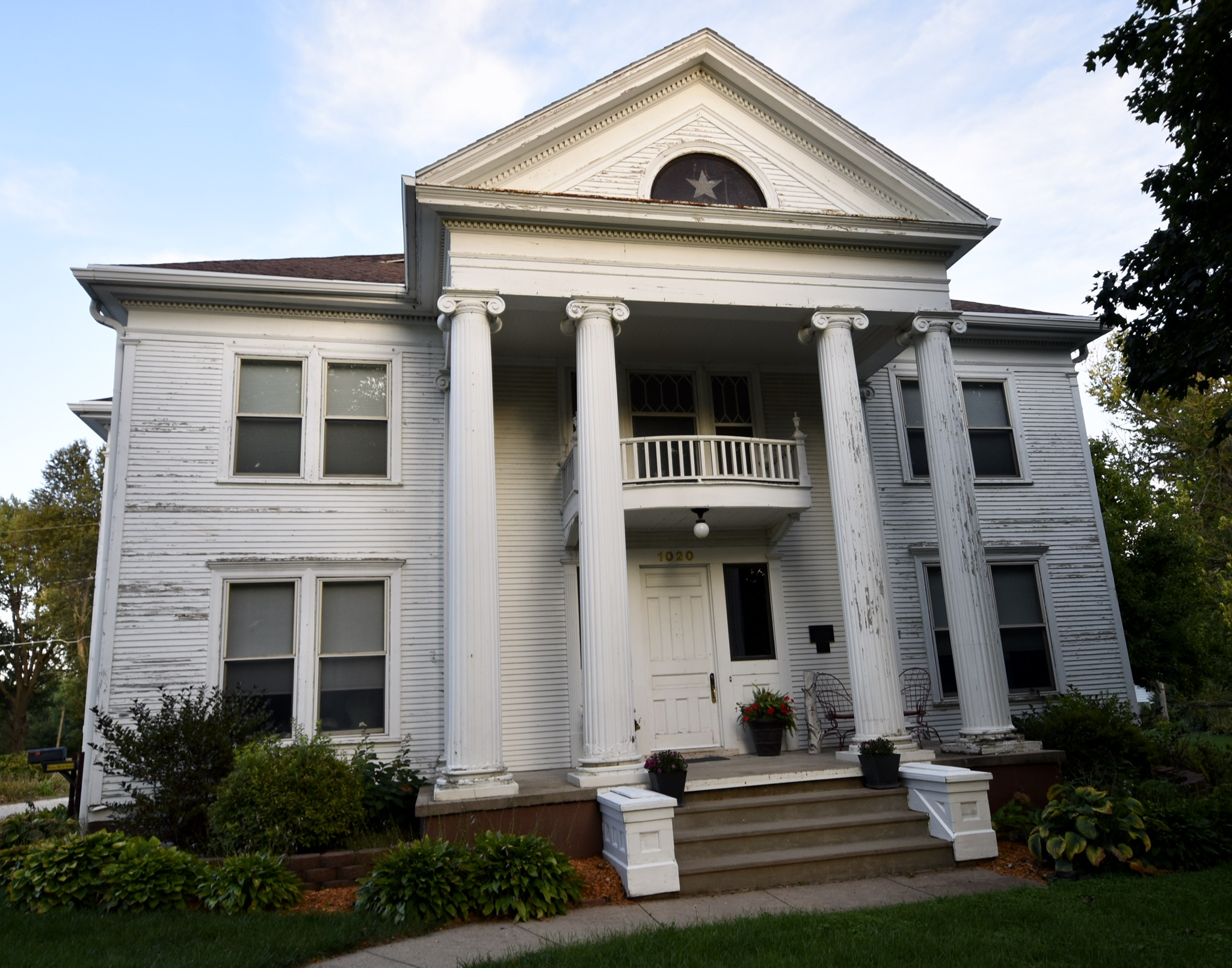

- Location within Iowa Location within the United States
- Location: 1020 Boundary St. Red Oak, Iowa
- Coordinates: 41°0′38″N 95°13′22″W
- Area: less than one acre
- Built: 1897
- Built by: William A. Hardy
- Architectural style: Late 19th and 20th Century Revivals; Classical Revival
- NRHP reference No.: 97001287
- Added to NRHP: October 30, 1997

The Edmund B. Osborne House, also known as the Heritage Hill Bed and Breakfast, is a historic residence located in Red Oak, Iowa, United States. Osborne is the inventor and co-developer of the art calendar industry. He had William A. Hardy build this house for him in 1897, but lived in it for only two years when he moved to New Jersey to be closer to the art center of the United States. The 2½-story frame structure features a full-height central portico with a classical pediment that is supported by paired columns in the Ionic order, and decorative entablature. The house is capped with a hip roof. It was listed on the National Register of Historic Places in 1997.
