= George M. La Monte =

American politician

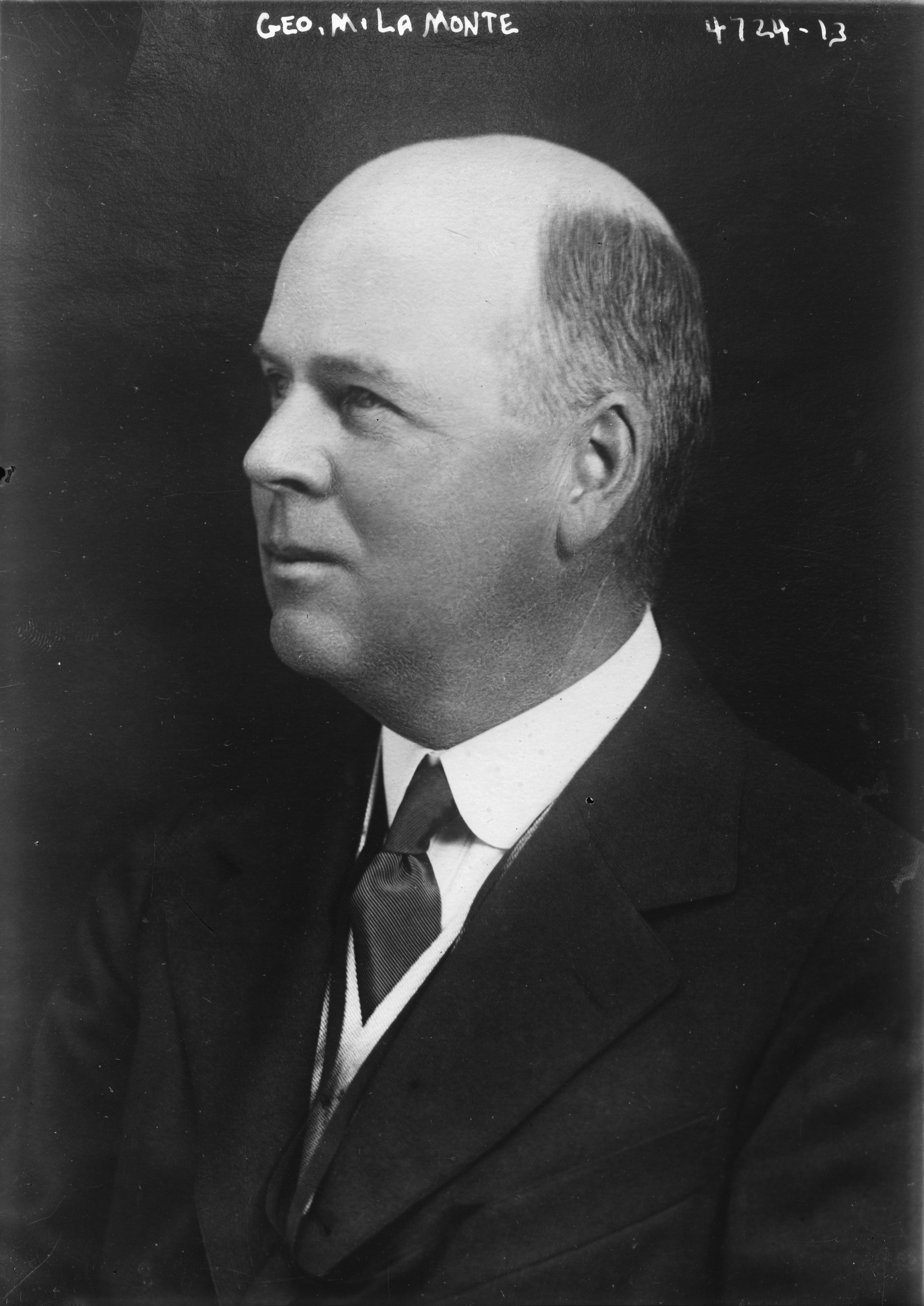

George Mason La Monte (June 4, 1863 – December 24, 1927) was an American businessman, philanthropist, and Democratic politician. He was the Democratic nominee for United States Senate in New Jersey in 1918 and served as chairman of the board of the Prudential Insurance Company.

== Early life and business career ==
La Monte was born in 1863 in Danville, Virginia, the son of George T. La Monte and Rebecca Kern. His family later settled in Bound Brook, where he lived until his death. He studied at Columbia University for a year before entering Wesleyan University, where he graduated in 1884. After working as a commercial reporter for the Bradstreet company, he trained at the paper company of Augustine Smith & Co. for several years.

La Monte then joined his father in the formation of a company to manufacture safety paper used as an anti-fraud measure in the printing of checks and money orders. The company, George La Monte & Son, had its main office in New York City and its manufacturing plant in Nutley, New Jersey. La Monte was president of the company for thirty-one years.

== Political career ==
In 1911 La Monte served a term in the New Jersey General Assembly. He was a delegate to the 1912 Democratic National Convention and a presidential elector for Woodrow Wilson. From 1912 to 1916 he was the New Jersey State Commissioner of Banking and Insurance.

In 1918 he was the Democratic candidate for the open seat in the United States Senate left vacant after the death of William Hughes. (David Baird was elected to fill the remainder of Hughes' term but did not stand for reelection.) Though La Monte did not campaign actively for his candidacy, President Wilson wrote a public letter warmly endorsing him. In the general election, La Monte was defeated by Walter Evans Edge, then serving as governor.

== Later life ==
After the election, La Monte returned to his business and philanthropic interests. He served as president of the First National Bank of Bound Brook and was a major contributor to Bound Brook civic institutions. After several years on the board of directors of the Prudential Insurance Company, he was elected chairman of the board in 1925, serving in that position until his death.

La Monte lived for many years at the Piedmont Farm in Bound Brook, where he maintained a prized herd of Guernsey cows. He married Anna I. Vaill in 1887, and they had three children: George V. La Monte (vice president of his father's firm), Archibald D. La Monte, and Isabel La Monte (who married Edmond B. Hackett).

On December 24, 1927, La Monte died of heart disease at the Weylin Hotel in New York City. He was 64 years old.

Party political offices
Preceded by Charles O. Hennessy	Democratic Nominee for the U.S. Senate (Class 2) from New Jersey; 1918	Succeeded by Frederick W. Donnelly
