= Charles O'Connor Hennessy =

American politician

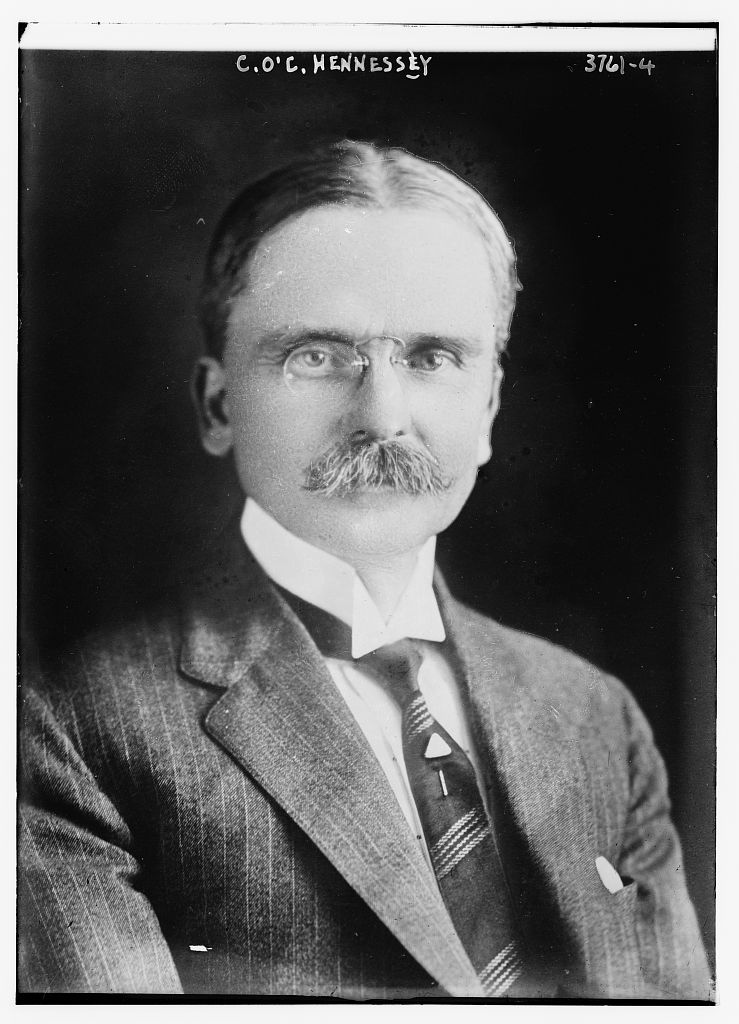
- Hennessey circa 1916

Member of the New Jersey Senate from Bergen County
- In office 1914–1917
- Preceded by: James A. C. Johnson
- Succeeded by: William B. Mackay Jr.

Personal details
- Born: November 9, 1860 Waterford, Ireland
- Died: November 19, 1936 (aged 76) Haworth, New Jersey

Charles O'Connor Hennessy (September 11, 1860 – 1936) was an American Democratic Party politician who served as a member of both the New Jersey General Assembly and the New Jersey Senate. In 1916 he ran unsuccessfully for Governor of New Jersey. He played a major role in the growth of Haworth, New Jersey, where he founded the Haworth Country Club. He was chairman of the Franklin Society for Building and Savings. He was a dedicated advocate of Georgism.

== Biography ==
He was born on September 11, 1860, in Waterford, Ireland and had a brother John Aloysius Hennessy. He migrated from Ireland to Brooklyn, New York and then to Bergen County, New Jersey, where he lived in Haworth. In 1916 he ran unsuccessfully for Governor of New Jersey.

He served a single two-year term in the New Jersey General Assembly before being elected to the New Jersey Senate. Having introduced the legislation, Hennessy helped see passage of proposals to stage a convention to amend the Constitution of New Jersey, and approval of bills to approve an income tax in the United States and the direct election of members of the United States Senate.

He died on October 19, 1936, at age 76 in Haworth, New Jersey.
