= James Fairman Fielder =

American politician and Governor of New Jersey

James F. Fielder
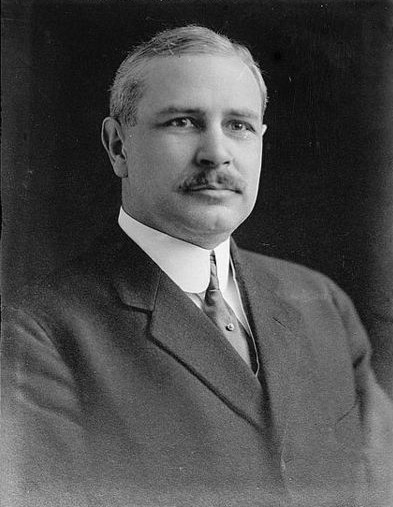

35th Governor of New Jersey
- In office January 20, 1914 – January 15, 1917
- Preceded by: Leon R. Taylor (acting)
- Succeeded by: Walter Evans Edge
- Acting; March 1, 1913 – October 28, 1913
- Preceded by: Woodrow Wilson
- Succeeded by: Leon R. Taylor (acting)

President of the New Jersey Senate
- In office January 14, 1913 – October 28, 1913
- Preceded by: John Dyneley Prince
- Succeeded by: James A. C. Johnson

Member of the New Jersey Senate from Hudson County
- In office January 15, 1907 – October 28, 1913
- Preceded by: James F. Minturn
- Succeeded by: Charles M. Egan

Member of the New Jersey General Assembly
- In office January 13, 1903 – January 10, 1905

Personal details
- Born: James Fairman Fielder; February 26, 1867 Jersey City, New Jersey
- Died: December 2, 1954 (aged 87) Newark, New Jersey
- Resting place: Fairmount Cemetery, Newark
- Party: Democratic
- Spouse: Mabel Cholwell Miller (1874–1953)

James Fairman Fielder (February 26, 1867 – December 2, 1954) was an American lawyer and Democratic politician and jurist who served as the 35th governor of New Jersey from 1914 to 1917. He had previously served as acting governor in 1913 but stepped down from office to avoid constitutional limits on serving successive terms.

During his time as governor of New Jersey, a wide range of progressive reforms was carried out.

== Early life ==
James Fairman Fielder was born in Jersey City, New Jersey on February 26, 1867 to George Bragg Fielder, who later served as a United States representative, and Eleanor A. Brinkerhoff Fielder, a descendant of the early settlers of Jersey City. His uncle, William Brinkerhoff, was the State Senator for Hudson County from 1884 to 1886.

Fielder attended Jersey City public schools and boarding school in Norwalk, Connecticut. In 1886, he received an LL.B. from Columbia Law School and was admitted to the Hudson County bar the following year. He practiced in the law offices of his uncle, who had just left office as State Senator, and was eventually made partner.

== Early political career ==
Fielder entered politics by serving on the Hudson County Democratic Committee. In 1903 and 1904, he was elected to one-year terms in the State General Assembly.

=== State Senator (1907–13) ===
In 1906, he was elected to the New Jersey Senate to represent all of Hudson County.

As Senator, Fielder served on the committees on Banks and Insurance, the Judiciary, Riparian Rights, Passed Bills, the School for the Deaf Mutes, and the Soldiers' Home. He was a loyal ally of Governor Woodrow Wilson; in his final message to the legislature as Governor, Wilson praised Fielder as "a man of proved character, capacity, fidelity and devotion to the public service, a man of the type to which the people of this State desire their public men to conform."

== Governor of New Jersey (1913, 1914–17) ==
=== Acting Governor (March–October 1913) ===
In 1912, Governor Woodrow Wilson was elected President of the United States. Thus, he was expected to resign as Governor in March 1913, with under a year left on his term. The State Senate President would serve as acting Governor ex officio, thus making the election of the next Senate President a de facto election for Governor. Fielder was elected President at the opening of the session in January 1913 and succeeded to the powers of the Governor when Wilson resigned in March.

As acting Governor, Fielder generally maintained Wilson's opposition to the Smith–Nugent machine and completed several items on Wilson's agenda, including the enactment of a railroad safety bill and a bill providing for widows' pensions. He also vetoed a special bill for Atlantic City which would have weakened the city's commission government and potentially led to similar reforms in other cities, including his native Jersey City. Fielder failed to win passage of some more ambitious initiatives, including a call for a constitutional convention and a bill to reform to the state's system for selecting jurors. Despite ostensible control of the Senate, the constitutional convention bill was defeated by Senators from rural counties, who feared that reform could reduce their power in the legislature.

=== 1913 gubernatorial election ===
Within a week of becoming acting Governor, Fielder announced his candidacy for a full term. His main rival for the Democratic nomination was H. Otto Wittpenn, the progressive mayor of Jersey City, with whom he competed for Wilson's support. He was also opposed by Frank S. Katzenbach, the former mayor of Trenton who had run twice before. The campaign was fundamentally settled on July 23, when President Wilson called on Wittpenn to unite the party behind Fielder, who had "backed [Wilson] so consistently, so intelligently, so frankly and honestly throughout my administration ... that I feel I would have no ground whatever upon which to oppose his candidacy."

Fielder went on to easily defeat Katzenbach in the September 23 primary with support from the Smith–Nugent machine. A week after the primary, Fielder attacked the Smith–Nugent machine publicly, seeking to emulate Wilson in declaring his independence from machine politics. Wilson immediately expressed his support. Fielder conducted a vigorous speaking tour throughout the state and resigned from the Senate on October 28 so as to create a vacancy in the governorship and avoid constitutional limits on succeeding himself. On Election Day, he won a secure plurality of 32,850 votes in a three way race against Republican Edward C. Stokes and Progressive Everett Colby.

=== Term in office (1914–17) ===
Fielder took office for a full term as Governor on January 20, 1914 and served until his term expired on January 15, 1917.

By the beginning of his term, the Smith–Nugent machine had recovered from its nadir during the Wilson administration, and the Democratic majority Fielder needed to pass progressive legislation had evaporated, with most progressives returning to the Republican ranks. Instead, Fielder formed an alliance with Frank Hague, the new boss of the Hudson County political machine. He secured repeal of the Hillery Maximum Tax law, which protected railroads from equal corporate taxation. Fielder also signed legislation to impose an inheritance tax, reform municipal and county primary elections, strengthen pure food laws, reform the penal system, increase funding for agricultural research, tax bank stocks, and establish a Legislative Reference Bureau.

Nevertheless, the first legislative session was disappointing to Fielder, who wrote to Joseph P. Tumulty,

"I have been up against some difficult legislative situations ... but this is the worst that I ever encountered. There are several factions of Democrats and at least two of the Republicans with outside influences constantly at work on each and ... the Democratic Assemblymen, for the most part, are the most unreliable lot of men we ever had to deal with. One never knows upon whom he count to assist in legislation."

In the fall 1914 elections, Republicans won both houses of the legislature, and they increased their majorities in 1915. Fielder signed some progressive legislation in his final two years in office, including a reduction in the number of boards, departments and commissions in state government; the creation of a central purchasing bureau for the state government; a requirement for advance announcement of proposed expenditures to permit public review and comment; protections for factory workers and a ten-hour work day for women. Several other laws aimed at improving working conditions were also introduced during the course of Fielder's tenure. A coalition of Democrats and Republicans, however, overrode his veto to overturn many of Wilson's reforms to the state corporation laws.

In October 1915, three constitutional amendments were subject to public referendum; Fielder opposed the amendment to grant women suffrage which, along with the amendments to simplify the amendment process and expand municipal authority to condemn land, failed.

By the end of his term, Fielder was largely sidelined by the legislature, whom he denounced and vowed to retire from politics for life.

== Personal life ==
Fielder married Mabel Cholwell Miller of Norwalk, Connecticut on June 4, 1895.

== Later life and death ==
Fielder served as the State Food Administrator to aid the American war effort in 1917.

In 1919, Fielder was named vice chancellor of the New Jersey Court of Chancery, a post he retained for twenty-nine years.

Fiedler died on December 2, 1954, of a heart attack at Mountainside Hospital. He was buried in the mausoleum in Fairmount Cemetery, Newark.

== See also ==
- List of governors of New Jersey

Political offices
Preceded by John Dyneley Prince	President of the New Jersey Senate; 1913	Succeeded by James A. C. Johnson
Preceded by Woodrow Wilson	Governor of New Jersey; Acting; March 1, 1913 – October 28, 1913	Succeeded by Leon R. Taylor; Acting
Preceded by Leon R. Taylor; Acting	Governor of New Jersey; January 20, 1914 – January 15, 1917	Succeeded by Walter Evans Edge
Party political offices
Preceded by Woodrow Wilson	Democratic Nominee for Governor of New Jersey; 1913	Succeeded by H. Otto Wittpenn
