= Leon Rutherford Taylor =

American politician (1883-1924)

Leon Taylor
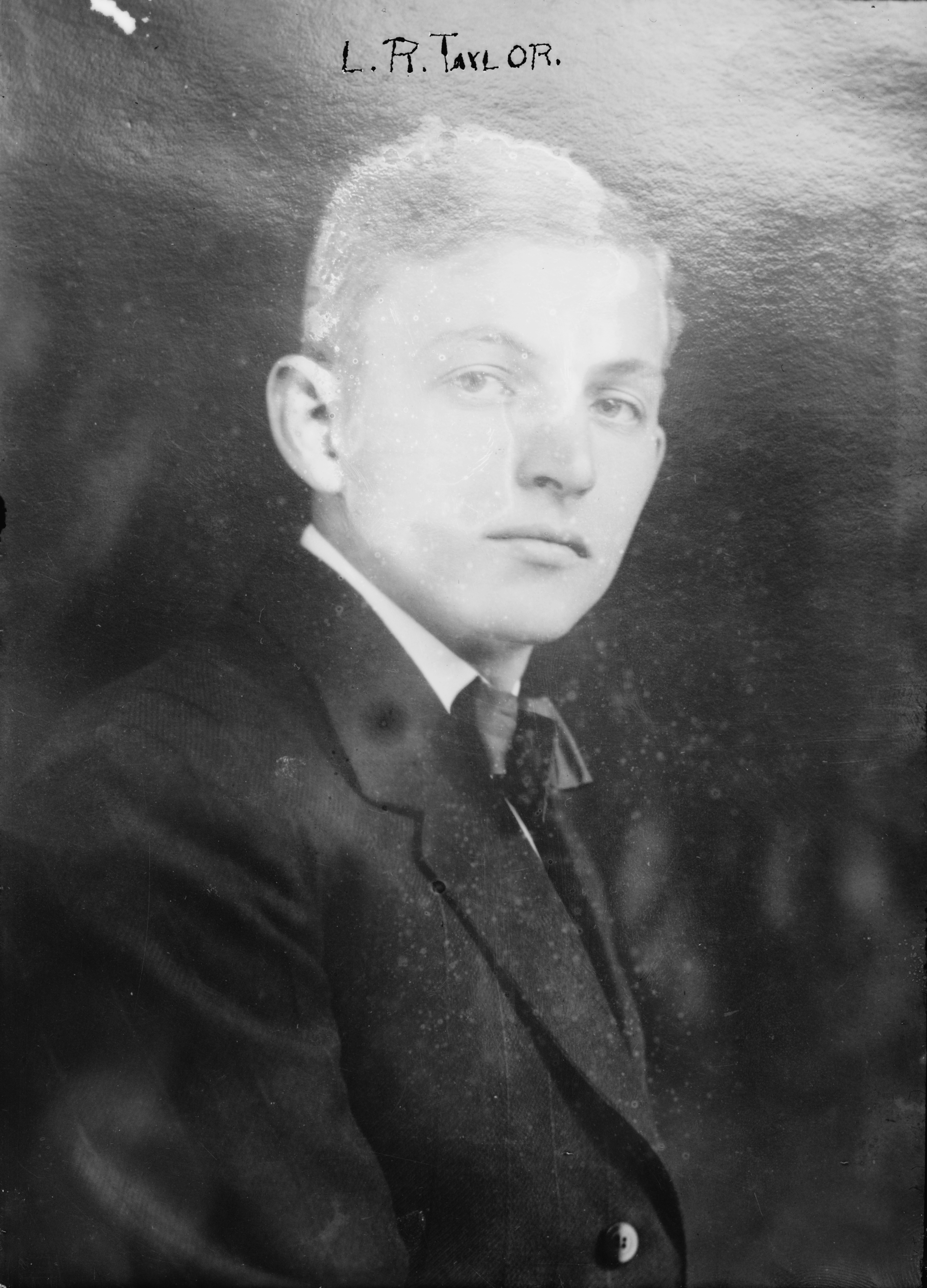
- Taylor, c. 1910–1915

Acting Governor of New Jersey
- In office October 28, 1913 – January 20, 1914
- Preceded by: James Fairman Fielder (acting)
- Succeeded by: James Fairman Fielder

Member of the New Jersey General Assembly

Personal details
- Born: Leon Rutherford Taylor; October 26, 1883 Asbury Park, New Jersey, U.S.
- Died: April 1, 1924 (aged 40) Denver, Colorado, U.S.
- Party: Democratic

Leon Rutherford Taylor (October 26, 1883 – April 1, 1924) was an American politician who was the acting governor of New Jersey from October 28, 1913, to January 20, 1914. Taylor took office upon the resignation of James Fairman Fielder, who had stepped down to create a vacancy in the governorship and avoid constitutional limits on succeeding himself.

== Biography ==
Taylor was born in Asbury Park, New Jersey, on October 26, 1883. He attended Denison University in Ohio, studied law and established himself as a lawyer in New Jersey. Taylor was elected to three terms in the New Jersey General Assembly, and was chosen as its speaker. After Governor of New Jersey James Fairman Fielder resigned from office on October 28, 1913, Taylor became acting governor by virtue of his role as speaker of the house, serving until January 20, 1914, when Fielder assumed a full term in office. Taylor died on April 1, 1924, in Denver, Colorado. He never married and had no children.

Political offices
| Preceded by Thomas F. McCran | Speaker of the New Jersey General Assembly; 1913 | Succeeded by Azariah M. Beekman |
| Preceded by James Fairman Fielder; Acting | Governor of New Jersey; Acting; October 28, 1913 – January 20, 1914 | Succeeded by James Fairman Fielder |
