= George Lawrence Record =

American lawyer and activist

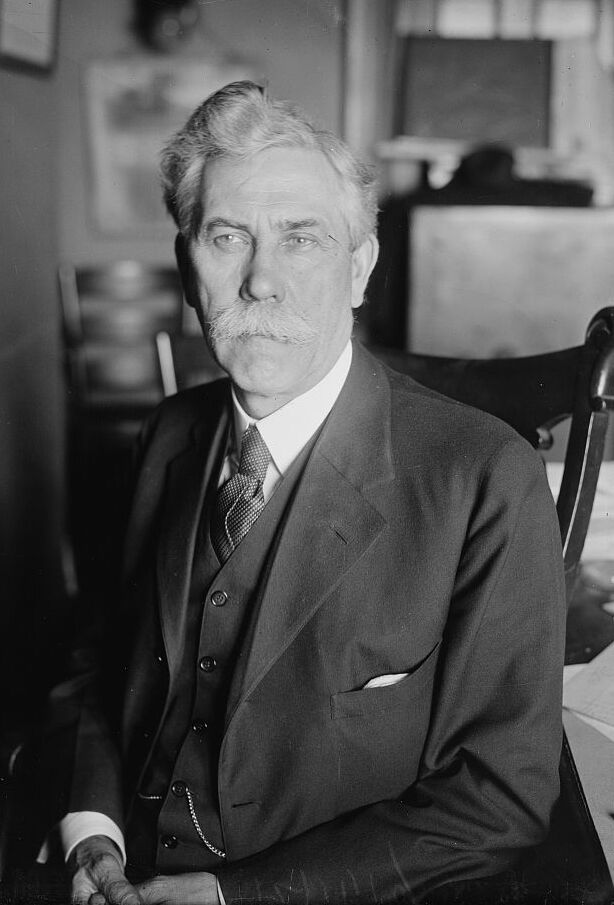
Record in 1918

George Lawrence Record (1859 – September 27, 1933) was an American lawyer, activist, and politician from Jersey City, New Jersey. He ran unsuccessfully for several offices, including Governor of New Jersey and United States Senator.

Though he lost all six of his attempts at elected office, Record held various state and municipal appointive offices and was a leading figure in the state's liberal progressive movement. He frequently brought suit against New Jersey public utilities as a consumer advocate and labor spokesman. In Jersey City politics, he was aligned with reformist Democrat Mark M. Fagan against party boss Frank Hague.

== Early life ==
George Lawrence Record was born in Auburn, Maine, in 1859. He attended public schools in Auburn and received his law degree from Bates College.

In the late 1880s, he settled in Jersey City and was admitted to the bar.

== Political career ==
Record entered politics as a member of the Democratic Party in overwhelmingly Democratic Hudson County and was seen as a promising orator.

In 1890, he was the foreman of a Hudson County grand jury which returned the first indictments against racetrack gamblers in the state, raising his profile as a crusader against vice. In 1892, he drafted the state's first bill establishing a direct primary; it was introduced and defeated annually in the New Jersey Legislature.

In the campaign of 1896, Record left the national Democratic Party over opposition to William Jennings Bryan's campaign for free silver. He joined the Republican Party and emerged as one of its leading progressives. In municipal politics, he remained aligned with the independent Democratic faction led by Mark M. Fagan. When Fagan was elected mayor of Jersey City, he appointed Record as corporation counsel for the city.

During the Woodrow Wilson administration, Record was appointed to the New Jersey Riparian Commission and the State Board of Equalization of Taxes.

In 1912, Record was a delegate to the Republican National Convention and a leading supporter of Theodore Roosevelt. After Roosevelt lost the nomination and left the party, Record became the leading spokesman of the Progressive Party in New Jersey. After that party collapsed, he rejoined the Republicans and was a presidential elector for Charles Evans Hughes in 1916.

=== Failed bids for office ===
He ran for the following offices:

- New Jersey Senate from Hudson County in 1901
- New Jersey General Assembly in 1908
- U.S. Representative in 1910
- U.S. Senate in 1918 (Republican primary)
- U.S. Senate in 1922 (Republican primary)
- U.S. Senate in 1924 (as Progressive nominee)

== Death and burial ==
He died from a cerebral hemorrhage on September 27, 1933, in the State Street Hospital in Portland, Maine. He was buried in Bayview – New York Bay Cemetery.
